= List of highest mountains of Austria =

This page shows the highest mountains in Austria as well as the highest mountains in each mountain range and in each of the Austrian states. The heights are given in metres above the Adriatic Sea.

== Highest mountains in Austria ==
This table lists about 150 Austrian summits above 3150 m with a topographic prominence of at least 150 m and nine peaks of note with a slightly lower re-ascent. Only those mountains with a prominence of 150 m or more are ranked.

Rank	Image	Mountain	Height (m)	Region	Range	Coordinates	Isolation (km)	Prominence (m)	First ascent
1		Großglockner	3798	Ca/ET	Glockner Group; Hohe Tauern	47°04′27″N 12°41′40″E	174.6; Königspitze	2,428; Brenner Pass	1800
2		Wildspitze	3770	NT	Ötztal Alps; Weißkamm	46°53′07″N 10°52′02″E	48.5; Ortler	2,263; Reschen Pass	1848
3		Weißkugel	3739	NT/ST	Ötztal Alps; Weißkamm	46°47′52″N 10°43′35″E	14.9; Wildspitze	569; Langtauferer Joch	1845
		Glocknerwand	3721	Ca/ET	Glockner Group; Hohe Tauern	47°04′45″N 12°41′12″E	0.8; Großglockner	132; Untere Glocknerscharte	1872
4		Großvenediger	3666	ET/Sb	Venediger Group; Hohe Tauern	47°06′33″N 12°20′47″E	26.1; Glocknerwand	1,185; Felbertauern	1841
5		Hintere Schwärze	3628	NT/ST	Ötztal Alps; Maine Ridge	46°46′24″N 10°54′53″E	13.3; Wildspitze	838; Hochjoch	1867
6		Hinterer Brochkogel	3628	NT	Ötztal Alps; Weißkamm	46°53′10″N 10°50′59″E	0.9; Wildspitze	160; Mitterkarjoch	1858
7		Similaun	3599	NT/ST	Ötztal Alps; Maine Ridge	46°45′49″N 10°52′51″E	2.8; Hintere Schwärze	261; Similaunjoch	1834
8		Vorderer Brochkogel	3565	NT	Ötztal Alps; Weißkamm	46°52′29″N 10°51′03″E	1.1; Hinterer Brochkogel	165; Vernagtjoch	1851
9		Großes Wiesbachhorn	3564	Sb	Glockner Group; Hohe Tauern	47°09′23″N 12°45′19″E	9.7; Glocknerwand	481; Gruberscharte	1795
10		Rainerhorn	3559	ET	Venediger Group; Hohe Tauern	47°06′03″N 12°21′51″E	1.3; Großvenediger	153; Rainertörl	1859
11		Großer Ramolkogel	3550	NT	Ötztal Alps; Maine Ridge	46°50′48″N 10°57′32″E	7.9; Wildspitze	380; Fanatjoch	1862
12		Schalfkogel	3540	NT	Ötztal Alps; Maine Ridge	46°48′06″N 10°57′33″E	4.5; Hintere Schwärze	351; Ramoljoch	1830
13		Hochvernagtspitze	3535	NT	Ötztal Alps; Weißkamm	46°52′53″N 10°47′46″E	4.0; Hinterer Brochkogel	299; Taschachjoch	1865
14		Watzespitze	3533	NT	Ötztal Alps; Kaunergrat	46°59′22″N 10°47′44″E	12.1; Hochvernagtspitze	489; Ölgrubenjoch	1869
15		Langtauferer Spitze	3529	NT/ST	Ötztal Alps; Weißkamm	46°48′17″N 10°44′45″E	1.4; Weißkugel	173; Weißkugeljoch	1865
		Mutmalspitze	3528	NT	Ötztal Alps; Maine Ridge	46°46′59″N 10°54′28″E	1.1; Hintere Schwärze	138; Hintere Schwärzenjoch	1868
16		Weißseespitze	3518	NT/ST	Ötztal Alps; Weißkamm	46°50′48″N 10°43′02″E	5.1; Langtauferer Spitze	350; Gepatschferner	1870
17		Fineilspitze	3514	NT/ST	Ötztal Alps; Maine Ridge	46°46′49″N 10°49′55″E	4.1; Similaun	504; Niederjoch	1865
18		Hochfeiler	3510	NT/ST	Zillertal Alps; Main ridge	46°58′20″N 11°43′40″E	49.0; Großvenediger	982; East of Hörndljoch	1865
19		Zuckerhütl	3507	NT	Stubai Alps	46°57′52″N 11°09′14″E	19.6; Ramolkogel	1,033; Timmelsjoch	1863
20		Dreiherrnspitze	3499	ET/Sb/ST	Venediger Group; Hohe Tauern	47°04′09″N 12°14′27″E	8.8; Großvenediger	581; Obersulzbachtörl	1866
21		Schrankogel	3497	NT	Stubai Alps	47°02′38″N 11°05′57″E	9.7; Zuckerhütl	523; Eissatel (N of Hinterer Daunkopf)	1840
22		Fluchtkogel	3497	NT	Ötztal Alps; Weißkamm	46°51′28″N 10°47′33″E	2.5; Hochvernagtspitze	256; Gepatschjoch	1869
23		Rötspitze	3496	ET/ST	Venediger Group; Hohe Tauern	47°01′37″N 12°12′19″E	5.5; Dreiherrenspitze	653; Hinteres Umbaltörl	1854
24		Firmisanschneide	3491	NT	Ötztal Alps; Maine Ridge	46°49′11″N 10°57′13″E	2.0; Schalfkogel	204; Firmisanjoch	1870
		Simonyspitzen	3488	ET/Sb	Venediger Group; Hohe Tauern	47°04′22″N 12°15′42″E	1.6; Dreiherrenspitze	117; Umbalscharte	1871
25		Hintereisspitzen	3486	NT/ST	Ötztal Alps; Weißkamm	46°49′22″N 10°45′51″E	2.3; Langtaufererspitze	270; Kesselwandjoch	1875
26		Großer Möseler	3480	NT/ST	Zillertal Alps; Main ridge	46°59′33″N 11°46′55″E	4.7; Hochfeiler	455; Neveser Sattel	1865
27		Hochwilde	3480	NT/ST	Ötztal Alps; Maine Ridge	46°45′56″N 11°01′20″E	6.1; Schalfkogel	355; SW of Gurgler Eisjoch	1852
28		Olperer	3476	NT	Zillertal Alps; Tuxer Kamm	47°03′11″N 11°39′32″E	10.4; Hochfeiler	1,230; Pfitscherjoch	1867
29		Ruderhofspitze	3474	NT	Stubai Alps	47°02′22″N 11°08′36″E	3.4; Schrankogel	370; Schwarzenbergjoch	1864
30		Hinterer Seelenkogel	3472	NT/ST	Ötztal Alps; Maine Ridge	46°48′06″N 11°02′40″E	4.3; Hochwilde	441; Langtaler Joch	1871
31		Karlesspitze	3462	NT/ST	Ötztal Alps; Maine Ridge	46°46′21″N 10°58′29″E	3.2; Schalfkogel	192; Kleinleitenjoch	1869
		Wilder Pfaff	3456	NT/ST	Stubai Alps	46°57′57″N 11°09′52″E	0.75; Zuckerhütl	116; Pfaffensattel	1870
32		Kreuzspitze	3455	NT	Ötztal Alps; Maine Ridge	46°48′59″N 10°52′12″E	4.9; Fineilspitze	228; N of Sennkogel	1865
33		Bliggspitze	3454	NT	Ötztal Alps; Kaunergrat	46°55′05″N 10°47′10″E	4.1; Hochvernagtspitze	387; N of Eiskastenspitze	1874
34		Johannisberg	3453	Ca/Sb	Glockner Group; Hohe Tauern	47°06′34″N 12°40′22″E	2.1; Romariswandköpfe	293; Unt. Ödenwinkelscharte	1844
35		Vordere Ölgrubenspitze	3452	NT	Ötztal Alps; Kaunergrat	46°54′30″N 10°46′24″E	1.5; Vordere Ölgrubenspitze	244; Bliggschartl	1876
36		Sonklarspitze	3444	NT/ST	Stubai Alps	46°57′22″N 11°09′52″E	1.4; Zuckerhütl	169; Sonklarscharte	1869
37		Hinterer Brunnenkogel	3440	NT	Ötztal Alps; Weißkamm	46°54′46″N 10°51′41″E	1.9; Schuchtkogel	274; Mittelbergjoch	1873
		Hochgall	3436	ST/ET	Rieserferner Group; Hohe Tauern	46°54′39″N 12°08′23″E	13.7; Rötspitze	1,148; Klammjoch	1868
38		Hintere Spiegelkogel	3426	NT	Ötztal Alps; Maine Ridge	46°49′45″N 10°57′32″E	1.1; Firmisanschneide	175; Spiegeljoch	1870
39		Verpeilspitze	3425	NT	Ötztal Alps; Kaunergrat	47°00′12″N 10°48′18″E	1.6; Watzespitze	415; Schneeiges Madatschjoch	1886
40		Klockerin	3425	Sb	Glockner Group; Hohe Tauern	47°08′50″N 12°44′10″E	1.6; Großes Wiesbachhorn	160; Wielingerscharte	1869
41		Turnerkamp	3420	NT/ST	Zillertal Alps; Main ridge	46°59′24″N 11°48′36″E	2.1; Großer Möseler	210; W of Rossruggspitze	1865
42		Wilder Freiger	3418	NT/ST	Stubai Alps	46°58′13″N 11°11′26″E	2.0; Wilder Pfaff	282; Pfaffennieder	1865
43		Östliche Seespitze	3416	NT	Stubai Alps	47°02′57″N 11°09′06″E	1.2; Ruderhofspitze	185; Hochmoosscharte	1863
44		Schrammacher	3411	NT	Zillertal Alps; Tuxer Kamm	47°01′37″N 11°38′35″E	3.1; Olperer	452; Alpeiner Scharte	1847
45		Weißer Kogel	3409	NT	Ötztal Alps; Weißkamm	46°53′30″N 10°54′22″E	2.1; Wildspitze	199; Taufkarjoch	1862
46		Talleitspitze	3406	NT	Ötztal Alps; Maine Ridge	46°49′59″N 10°53′11″E	2.2; Kreuzspitze	186	1811
47		Hochfirst	3403	NT/ST	Ötztal Alps; Maine Ridge	46°49′36″N 11°04′51″E	3.9; Hinterer Seelenkogel	393; NE of Scheiberkogel	1870
48		Daberspitze	3402	ET	Venediger Group; Hohe Tauern	47°00′59″N 12°12′25″E	1.0; Rötspitze	222; Welitzscharte	1873
49		Sennkogel	3400	NT	Ötztal Alps; Maine Ridge	46°48′18″N 10°51′21″E	1.6; Kreuzspitze	164; Saykogeljoch	1871
50		Fluchthorn	3399	NT	Silvretta	46°53′27″N 10°13′39″E	15.2; Piz Linard	647; Fuorcla Zadrell	1861
51		Liebenerspitze	3399	NT/ST	Ötztal Alps; Maine Ridge	46°49′13″N 11°04′32″E	0.8; Hochfirst	166; Gaisbergjoch	1872
52		Großer Bärenkopf	3396	Sb	Glockner Group; Hohe Tauern	47°07′51″N 12°43′54″E	1.8; Klockerin	302; Riffltor	1869
53		Hohe Geige	3395	NT	Ötztal Alps; Geigenkamm	47°00′17″N 10°54′31″E	7.9; Verpeilspitze	458; Nördliches Pollesjoch	1853
54		Rostizkogel	3394	NT	Ötztal Alps; Kaunergrat	46°58′07″N 10°47′41″E	1.8; Watzespitze	213; Seekarlesjoch ?	1893
55		Schrandele	3393	NT	Stubai Alps	47°03′17″N 11°06′42″E	1.3; Schrankogel	168; P. 3225	1868
56		Rötenspitze	3393	NT/ST	Ötztal Alps; Maine Ridge	46°46′30″N 10°56′40″E	1.3; Hintere Schwärze	156; Pfasser Scharte	1892
57		Großer Löffler	3379	NT/ST	Zillertal Alps; Main ridge	47°01′57″N 11°54′57″E	9.4; Turnerkamp	368; Trattenjoch	1843
58		Östliche Schwarzenbergspitze	3379	NT	Stubai Alps	47°01′52″N 11°07′14″E	1.9; Ruderhofspitze	206; Hölltalscharte	1888
59		Schwabenkopf	3379	NT	Ötztal Alps; Kaunergrat	47°00′23″N 10°47′38″E	0.9; Verpeilspitze	183; Schwabenjoch	1892
60		Eiskastenspitze	3373	NT	Ötztal Alps; Kaunergrat	46°55′49″N 10°47′30″E	1.3; Bliggspitze	203; Bliggjoch	1853
61		Vorderer Diemkogel	3372	NT	Ötztal Alps; Maine Ridge	46°48′40″N 10°55′22″E	1.9; Hintere Diemkogel	150	1853
62		Hoher Eichham	3371	ET	Venediger Group; Hohe Tauern	47°03′13″N 12°24′23″E	5 Hoher Zaun	329; Seekopfscharte	1887
63		Schwarzenstein	3369	NT/ST	Zillertal Alps; Main ridge	47°00′36″N 11°52′27″E	4.1; Großer Löffler	342; Floitenjoch	1852
64		Hoher Tenn	3368	Sb	Glockner Group; Hohe Tauern	47°10′47″N 12°45′34″E	2.1; Gross Wiesbachhorn	337; Wiesbachscharte	1840
65		Malhamspitzen	3368	ET	Venediger Group; Hohe Tauern	47°02′57″N 12°15′34″E	1.7; Hint. Gubachspitze	321; Reggentorl	1873
66		Innere Schwarze Schneid	3367	NT	Ötztal Alps; Weißkamm	46°55′27″N 10°55′17″E	3.7; Weißer Kogel	293; P. 3074	1876
67		Hochalmspitze	3360	Ca	Ankogel Group; Hohe Tauern	47°00′54″N 13°19′16″E	45.6; Großes Wiesbachhorn	946; Niederer Tauern	1855
68		Großer Geiger	3360	ET/Sb	Venediger Group; Hohe Tauern	47°05′35″N 12°18′32″E	2.8; Großvenediger	293; East of Maurertörl	1871
69		Wilde Leck	3359	NT	Stubai Alps	47°00′10″N 11°03′45″E	5.2; Schrankogel	309; Fernaujoch	1865
70		Mittlerer Bärenkopf	3358	Ca/Sb	Glockner Group; Hohe Tauern	47°07′38″N 12°42′48″E	1.4; Großer Bärenkopf	171; Keilscharte	1871
		Seekogel	3358	NT	Ötztal Alps; Kaunergrat	46°58′18″N 10°48′39″E	1.2; Rostizkogel	134; P. 3224	1899
71		Glockturm	3355	NT	Ötztal Alps; Glockturmkamm	46°53′36″N 10°39′56″E	6.2; Weißseespitze	415; Weißseejoch	1853
72		Rofelewand	3354	NT	Ötztal Alps; Kaunergrat	47°01′57″N 10°49′06″E	3.4; Verpeilspitze	529; Verpeiljoch	1873
		Aperer Pfaff	3353	NT	Stubai Alps	46°58′20″N 11°08′27″E	0.7; Zuckerhütl	145; Pfaffenjoch	1867
73		Windacher Daunkogel	3348	NT	Stubai Alps	46°59′15″N 11°04′52″E	2.2; Wilde Leck	245; Wütenkarsattel	1876
74		Warenkarseitenspitze	3347	NT	Stubai Alps	46°58′48″N 11°04′34″E	0.9; Windacher Daunkogel	161; Warenkarscharte	1890
75		Puitkogel	3345	NT	Ötztal Alps; Geigenkamm	46°58′53″N 10°54′05″E	2.6; Hohe Geige	392; Weißmaurachjoch	1894
76		Stubaier Wildspitze	3341	NT	Stubai Alps	46°58′59″N 11°05′58″E	1.5; Windacher Daunkogel	168; NW of Wildspitze	1882
77		Schaufelspitze	3332	NT	Stubai Alps	46°58′42″N 11°06′57″E	1.3; Stubaier Wildspitze	216; Bildstöckljoch	1862
78		Fuscherkarkopf	3331	Ca/Sb	Glockner Group; Hohe Tauern	47°05′56″N 12°44′44″E	3.5; Hohe Dock	490; Fuscherkarscharte	1845
79		Löcherkogel	3324	NT	Ötztal Alps; Kaunergrat	46°57′33″N 10°47′29″E	1.0; Rostizkogel	243; Rostizjoch	1900
80		Granatenkogel	3318	NT/ST	Ötztal Alps; Maine Ridge	46°50′13″N 11°04′20″E	1.2; Hochfirst	158; Hochfirstjoch	1891
81		Großer Hexenkopf	3313	ET	Venediger Group; Hohe Tauern	47°03′34″N 12°24′20″E	0.6; Hoher Eichham	188; Nördl. Eichhamscharte	1898
82		Piz Buin	3312	Vb/Gb	Silvretta	46°50′39″N 10°07′07″E	6.1; Piz Linard	544; Futschölpass	1865
83		Vorderer Brunnenkogel	3306	NT	Stubai Alps	47°04′59″N 11°06′19″E	1.0; Hinterer Brunnenkogel	181; P. 3125	1895
84		Reichenspitze	3303	Sb/NT	Zillertal Alps; Eastern group	47°08′22″N 12°06′39″E	12.6; Dreiherrnspitze	683; Schüttaler Joch	1856
85		Weißspitze	3300	ET	Venediger Group; Hohe Tauern	47°04′34″N 12°23′33″E	1.9; Kristallwand	190; Frosnitztörl	1881
86		Lüsener Fernerkogel	3298	NT	Stubai Alps	47°05′48″N 11°06′54″E	1.7; Vorderer Brunnenkogel	163; N of Lüsener Spitze	1836
87		Strahlkogel	3295	NT	Stubai Alps	47°06′33″N 11°01′10″E	7.1; Vorderer Brunnenkogel	513; Winnebachjoch	1833
88		Hintere Ölgrubenspitze	3295	NT	Ötztal Alps; Kaunergrat	46°53′27″N 10°46′30″E	1.1; Sexegertenspitze	185; Wannetjoch	1871
89		Keeskogel	3291	Sb	Venediger Group; Hohe Tauern	47°08′11″N 12°18′43″E	3.2; Großvenediger	374; Zwischensulzbachtörl	1840
90		Schlieferspitze	3290	Sb	Venediger Group; Hohe Tauern	47°07′22″N 12°14′36″E	4.6; Hint. Maurerkeeskopf	514; Krimmler Törl	1871
91		Hohe Wand	3289	NT/ST	Zillertal Alps; Tuxer Kamm	47°00′48″N 11°37′39″E	1.9; Schrammacher	154; E of Sagwandspitze	1883
92		Gefrorene-Wand-Spitzen	3288	NT	Zillertal Alps; Tuxer Kamm	47°03′53″N 11°40′44″E	2.0; Olperer	253; Riepensattel	1867
93		Breiter Grießkogel	3287	NT	Stubai Alps	47°06′04″N 11°01′22″E	0.9; Strahlkogel	157	1881
94		Großer Mörchner	3285	NT	Zillertal Alps; Main ridge	47°01′52″N 11°51′56″E	2.4; Schwarzenstein	154; Schwarzensteinsattel	1846
95		Petzeck	3283	Ca	Schober Group; Hohe Tauern	46°56′53″N 12°48′17″E	14.9; Hohenwartkopf	799; Peischlachtörl	1844
96		Roter Knopf	3281	Ca/ET	Schober Group; Hohe Tauern	46°58′43″N 12°44′22″E	6 Petzeck	549; Gößnitzscharte	1872
		Wildgerlosspitze	3280	Sb/NT	Zillertal Alps; Eastern group	47°08′37″N 12°05′54″E	1.1; Reichenspitze	145; W and E of Hahnenkamm	1877
97		Im Hinteren Eis	3279	NT	Ötztal Alps; Maine Ridge	46°47′48″N 10°47′23″E	2.8; Langtauferer Spitze	154; W of Teufelsegg	Early
98		Stockkogel / Zirmkogel	3278	NT	Ötztal Alps; Maine Ridge	46°52′53″N 10°59′20″E	1.3; Gampleskogel	153	1893
99		Habicht	3277	NT	Stubai Alps	47°02′37″N 11°17′23″E	10.1; Östliche Seespitze	527; Simmingjöchl	1836
100		Gsallkopf	3277	NT	Ötztal Alps; Kaunergrat	47°02′16″N 10°48′18″E	1.2; Rofelewand	287; Rofelejoch	1894
101		Feuerstein	3268	NT/ST	Stubai Alps	46°58′18″N 11°14′40″E	3.6; Wilder Freiger	428; Weites Türl	1854
102		Äussere Schwarze Schneid	3257	NT	Ötztal Alps; Weißkamm	46°56′15″N 10°57′10″E	2.2; Innere Schwarze Schneid	201; Seiter Jöchl	1853
103		Piz Buin Pitschen	3255	Vb/Gb	Silvretta	46°50′32″N 10°06′42″E	0.5; Piz Buin	199; Buinlücke	1868
104		Hocharn	3254	Ca/Sb	Goldberg Group; Hohe Tauern	47°04′34″N 12°56′14″E	13.9; Sinwelleck	678; Hochtor	1827
105		Berliner Spitze / III. Hornspitze	3253	NT	Zillertal Alps; Main ridge	47°00′09″N 11°50′42″E	3.0; Turnerkamp	233; Schwarzenbachscharte	1874
106		Ankogel	3252	Ca/Sb	Ankogel Group; Hohe Tauern	47°03′04″N 13°14′57″E	6.4; Hochalm Spitze	578; Großelendscharte	1762
107		Wassertalkogel	3252	NT	Ötztal Alps; Geigenkamm	46°58′01″N 10°54′19″E	1.5; Puitkogel	172	1895
108		Rauhkofel	3251	NT/ST	Zillertal Alps; Eastern group	47°04′34″N 12°05′31″E	7.2; Reichenspitze	593; Heiliges Geistjöchl	1853
109		Großer Hornkopf	3251	Ca	Schober Group; Hohe Tauern	46°58′02″N 12°46′44″E	2.8; Petzeck	455; Nd. Gradenscharte	1890
110		Quirl	3251	ET	Venediger Group; Hohe Tauern	47°01′59″N 12°16′08″E	1.5; Malhamspitzen	166; Steingrubenscharte	1887
111		Hohe Fürleg	3244	ET/Sb	Venediger Group; Hohe Tauern	47°08′30″N 12°21′46″E	2.9; Kleinvenediger	410; Untersulzbachtörl	1894
112		Silvrettahorn	3244	Vb/Gb	Silvretta	46°51′29″N 10°05′33.5″E	2.3; Piz Buin Pitschen	201; Fuorcla dal Cunfin	1865
113		Hochschober	3242	ET	Schober Group; Hohe Tauern	46°56′33″N 12°41′54″E	5 Roter Knopf	433; Kaisertörl	1852
114		Lenkstein	3236	ET/ST	Rieserferner Group; Hohe Tauern	46°56′21″N 12°10′01″E	3.0; Hochgall	152; Lenksteinjoch	1874
115		Hoher Seeblaskogel	3235	NT	Stubai Alps	47°05′44″N 11°04′29″E	2.7; Vorderer Brunnenkogel	365; N of Bachfallenkopf	1881
116		Großer Muntanitz	3232	ET	Granatspitz Group; Hohe Tauern	47°04′25″N 12°35′21″E	7.3; Grossglockner	717; Kalser Tauern	1871
117		Hoher Riffler	3231	NT	Zillertal Alps; Tuxer Kamm	47°04′52″N 11°42′16″E	2.6; Gefrorene-Wand-Spitzen	321; Friesenbergscharte	1853
118		Mörchenschneide	3230	NT	Zillertal Alps; Main ridge	47°02′04″N 11°51′40″E	0.5; Großer Mörchner	155; Mörchenschneidscharte	1892
119		Augstenberg	3228	NT/Gb	Silvretta	46°51′53″N 10°12′14″E	3.2; Fluchthorn	430; Vermuntpass	1881
120		Hintere Stangenspitze	3225	NT	Zillertal Alps; Main ridge	47°03′26″N 11°58′34″E	5.3; Großer Löffler	465; Frankbachjoch	1891
121		Hinterer Daunkopf	3225	NT	Stubai Alps	47°00′15″N 11°05′47″E	1.6; Westliche Daunkogel	168; Daunjoch	1887
122		Längentaler Weißer Kogel	3218	NT	Stubai Alps	47°04′12″N 11°05′09″E	1.3; Hinterer Brunnenkogel	230; Längentaljoch	1888
123		Gaißlehnkogel	3216	NT	Stubai Alps	47°03′48″N 11°04′35″E	1.1; Längentaler Weißer Kogel	164; Gaislehnscharte	1888
124		Signalhorn	3210	Vb/Gb	Silvretta	46°50′54″N 10°05′50″E	1.1; Silvrettahorn	163; Egghornlücke	1865
125		Wollbachspitze	3210	NT/ST	Zillertal Alps; Main ridge	47°03′00″N 11°58′47″E	0.8; Hintere Stangenspitze	155; Stangenjoch	1852
126		Hocheiser	3206	Sb	Glockner Group; Hohe Tauern	47°09′23″N 12°40′24″E	3.5; Hohe Riffl	567; Kapruner Törl	1871
127		Glödis	3206	ET	Schober Group; Hohe Tauern	46°57′40″N 12°43′34″E	1.9; Roter Knopf	376; Glödistörl	1872
128		Kitzsteinhorn	3203	Sb	Glockner Group; Hohe Tauern	47°11′17″N 12°41′15″E	3.7; Hocheiser	436; Geralscharte	1828
		Schattenspitze	3202	Vb	Silvretta	46°52′03″N 10°05′14″E	0.4; Schneeglocke	145; Schattenlücke	1914
129		Großer Greiner	3201	NT	Zillertal Alps; Main ridge	47°01′11″N 11°45′14″E	3.7; Großer Möseler	190; S of Gr. Greiner	1873
130		Zopetspitze	3198	ET	Venediger Group; Hohe Tauern	47°03′26″N 12°21′42″E	2.9; Großer Hexenkopf	216; Scheidlscharte	1898
131		Dreiländerspitze	3197	NT/Vb/Gb	Silvretta	46°51′04″N 10°08′42″E	2.0; Piz Buin	300; Urezzasjoch	1853
132		Pitztaler Urkund	3197	NT	Ötztal Alps; Weißkamm	46°53′43″N 10°48′34″E	0.7; Hochvernagtwand	164; Urkundsattel	Early ?
133		Kühlehnkarschneid	3195	NT	Stubai Alps	47°04′08″N 11°03′58″E	1.0; Geißlehnkg	185	1888
134		Westliche Floitenspitze	3195	NT/ST	Zillertal Alps; Main ridge	47°01′13″N 11°53′42″E	1.1; Schwarzenstein	168; Flojtenjoch	1876
135		Großer Löffler / Löffelspitze	3190	ET	Venediger Group; Hohe Tauern	47°01′03″N 12°09′52″E	2.9; Rötspitze	303; Rotenmannjoch	1877
136		Gleirscher Fernerkogel	3189	NT	Stubai Alps	47°06′50″N 11°03′50″E	3.2; Breiter Grießkogel	321; Zwieselbachjoch	1883
137		Krone	3188	NT/Gb	Silvretta	46°52′32″N 10°13′55″E	1.5; Fluchthorn	243; Zahnjoch	1849
138		Talggenköpfe	3179	NT	Zillertal Alps; Main ridge	47°00′48″N 11°45′45″E	1.0; Großer Greiner	150	1885
139		Keeseck / Keesegg	3173	ET	Venediger Group; Hohe Tauern	46°58′09″N 12°14′28″E	5.4; Daberspitze	275; S of Schwarzachtörl	1894
140		Grubenwand	3173	NT	Stubai Alps	47°07′05″N 11°05′07″E	1.7; Gleirscher Fernerkogel	225	1894
		Larstigspitze	3172	NT	Stubai Alps	47°06′32″N 11°02′01″E	0.7; Strahlkogel	140; Larstigscharte	1881
141		Plattigkopf	3170	NT	Ötztal Alps; Glockturmkamm	46°55′39″N 10°40′33″E	3.0; Rifflkarspitze	230; Kaiserjoch	1903
142		Kleinspitze	3169	NT	Zillertal Alps; Eastern group	47°05′18″N 12°04′49″E	1.5; Rauchkofel	175	1890
143		Hoher Riffler	3168	NT	Verwall Alps	47°06′57″N 10°22′15″E	23.8; Muttler	1,341; Zeinisjoch	1864
144		Jagdhausspitze	3165	ET	Venediger Group; Hohe Tauern	47°00′33″N 12°09′48″E	0.9; Löffelspitze	195	1894
145		Klammerköpfe	3163	Ca	Schober Group; Hohe Tauern	46°57′32″N 12°45′44″E	1.3; Hornkopf	233; Klammerscharte	?
146		Nederkogel/Nörderkogel	3163	NT	Ötztal Alps; Maine Ridge	46°54′25″N 11°00′33″E	1.4; Zirmkogel	231; Seiter Schartle	1853
147		Hohe Achsel	3161	ET	Venediger Group; Hohe Tauern	47°04′02″N 12°25′36″E	1.4; Hintere Seekopf	150	1905
148		Hohes Kreuz	3159	ET	Venediger Group; Hohe Tauern	47°00′27″N 12°13′31″E	1.5; Daberspitze	165; SE of Tredeberscharte	1904
149		Roßwandspitze	3157	NT	Zillertal Alps; Main ridge	47°04′59″N 11°57′36″E	2.8; Hintere Stangenspitze	210	1852
150		Fleischbachspitze	3157	ET	Rieserferner Group; Hohe Tauern	46°57′29″N 12°09′45″E	0.9; Muklaspitze	204; Fleischbachjoch	1876
151		Vordere Sonnenwand	3156	NT	Stubai Alps	47°07′46″N 11°03′42″E	1.7; Gleirscher Fernerkogel	150	1894
152		Kreuzspitze	3155	ET	Venediger Group; Hohe Tauern	47°02′48″N 12°21′34″E	1.2; Zopetspitze	211; P. 2944	Early
153		Murkarspitze	3150	NT	Stubai Alps	47°01′26″N 11°02′09″E	1.9; Kuhscheibe	205	1887
154		Alplesspitze	3149	ET	Venediger Group; Hohe Tauern	46°57′28″N 12°15′39″E	1.9; Keesegg	258; Panargenscharte	1896

== Highest mountain of each range ==
The ranges correspond to those listed for Austria in the AVE. (→ see diagram) If the highest mountain in a range is not within Austrian national territory it is not shown in the list. (e.g.: Piz Linard (3,411m), highest mountain in the Silvretta)

Ranking	Image	Summit	Height (m AA)	Location	Range	Isolation (km)	Prominence (m)
1		Großglockner	3798	Carinthia / Tyrol	Glockner Group; Hohe Tauern	175; Königspitze	2,424; Brenner Pass
2		Wildspitze	3768	Tyrol	Ötztal Alps	48.5; Ortler	2,262; Reschen Pass
3		Großvenediger	3662	Tyrol / Salzburg	Venediger Group; Hohe Tauern	26.6; Großglockner	1,181; Felber Tauern
4		Hochfeiler	3510	Tyrol / South Tyrol (Italy)	Zillertal Alps	49; Großvenediger	805; East of Hörndljoch
5		Zuckerhütl	3507	Tyrol	Stubai Alps	19.5; Mittl. Ramolkogel	1,033; Timmelsjoch
		Olperer	3476	Tyrol	Zillertal Alps / Tux Alps	10.5; Hochfeiler	1,230; Pfitscher Joch
		Hochgall	3436	South Tyrol (Italy) / Tyrol	Rieserferner Group; Hohe Tauern	13.7; Rötspitze	1,148; Klammjoch
6		Hochalmspitze	3360	Carinthia	Ankogel Group; Hohe Tauern	45.6; Großes Wiesbachhorn	942; Niederer Tauern
7		Petzeck	3283	Carinthia	Schober Group; Hohe Tauern	14.9; Hohenwartkopf	799; Peischlachtörl
8		Hocharn	3254	Carinthia / Salzburg	Goldberg Group; Hohe Tauern	14.5; Fuscherkarkopf	678; Hochtor
9		Großer Muntanitz	3232	Tyrol	Granatspitz Group; Hohe Tauern	5.6; Eiskögele	717; Kalser Tauern
10		Hoher Riffler	3168	Tyrol	Verwall	23.8; Stammerspitze	1,326 near Zeinisjoch
11		Parseierspitze	3036	Tyrol	Lechtal Alps	10.2; Hoher Riffler	1,243; Arlbergpass
12		Hoher Dachstein	2995	Upper Austria / Styria	Dachsteingebirge	48; Großer Hafner	2,136; Eben im Pongau
13		Schesaplana	2965	Vorarlberg / Graubünden (Switzerland)	Rätikon	29.8; Klein Seehorn	826; Schweizertor
14		Weiße Spitze	2962	Tyrol	Villgraten Mountains; Hohe Tauern	11.4; Lasörling	919; Staller Sattel
15		Zugspitze	2962	Tyrol / Bavaria (Germany)	Wettersteingebirge	24.6; Acherkogel	1,746; Fern Pass
16		Hochkönig	2941	Salzburg	Berchtesgaden Alps	34; Hoher Tenn	2,181 near Zell am See
17		Lizumer Reckner	2884	Tyrol	Tux Alps	7.6; Kleiner Kaserer	546; Tuxer Joch
18		Hochgolling	2863	Styria / Salzburg	Schladminger Tauern; Niedere Tauern	26.0; Hoher Dachstein	1,142; Radstädter Tauern
19		Mölltaler Polinik	2784	Carinthia	Kreuzeck Group; Hohe Tauern	13.6; Tristenspitz	1,579; Iselsberg
20		Hohe Warte	2780	Carinthia / Province of Udine (Italy)	Carnic Alps	33.4; Schleinitz	1,144; Kreuzbergpass
21		Große Sandspitze	2770	Tyrol	Gailtal Alps	14.9; Schleinitz	1,245; Kartitscher Sattel
22		Große Wildgrubenspitze	2753	Vorarlberg	Lechquellengebirge	6.6; Valluga	980; Flexenpass
23		Birkkarspitze	2749	Tyrol	Karwendel	26.8; Rosenjoch	1,569; Seefeld in Tirol
24		Weißeck	2711	Salzburg	Radstädter Tauern; Niedere Tauern	7.4; Kölnbreinspitze	451; Murtörl
25		Großer Krottenkopf	2656	Tyrol	Allgäu Alps	10.7; Holzgauer Wetterspitze	980 near Hochtann Mountain Pass
26		Birnhorn	2634	Salzburg	Leoganger Steinberge	15.5; Schönfeldspitze	1,665 near Grießen Pass
27		Kreuzjoch	2558	Tyrol	Kitzbühel Alps	8.8; Brandberger Kolm	1,051; Hinterer Plattwald
28		Großer Priel	2515	Upper Austria	Totes Gebirge	41.0; Gjaidstein	1,705 near Knoppenmoos
29		Großes Ochsenhorn	2511	Salzburg	Loferer Steinberge	9; Birnhorn	1,309 near Römersattel
30		Rettlkirchspitze	2475	Styria	Rottenmanner und Wölzer Tauern; Niedere Tauern	7.8; Schöderkogel	687; Sölk Pass
31		Eisenhut	2441	Styria	Gurktal Alps	29.3; Preber	800; Katschbergscharte
32		Raucheck	2430	Salzburg	Tennengebirge	11.0; Hochkönig	1,463; Sankt Martin am Tennengebirge
33		Geierhaupt	2417	Styria	Seckauer Tauern; Niedere Tauern	19.0; Großer Bösenstein	1,172; NW of Seiser Alm
34		Zirbitzkogel	2396	Styria	Lavanttal Alps	33.2; Seckauer Zinken	1,502; Neumarkter Sattel
35		Hochtor	2369	Styria	Ennstal Alps	20.8; Geierhaupt	1,520; Schoberpass
36		Ellmauer Halt	2344	Tyrol	Kaisergebirge	23.2; Großer Rothorn	1,551; East of Ellmau
37		Daniel	2340	Tyrol	Ammergau Alps	6.8; Schneefernerkopf	1,233; Lähn
38		Hochiss	2299	Tyrol	Brandenberg Alps (Rofan)	14.6; Hochnissl	1,359; Lärchenwiese
39		Hochschwab	2277	Styria	Hochschwab Group	38.7; Hochtor	1,045; Präbichl
40		Stol	2237	Carinthia / Upper Carniola (Slovenia)	Karawanks	22.5; Rjavina	1,021; Seebergsattel
41		Glatthorn	2134	Vorarlberg	Bregenzerwaldgebirge	6.2; Zitterklapfen	648; Faschinajoch
42		Schneeberg	2076	Lower Austria	Rax-Schneeberg Group	49.2; Ringkamp	1,348; Kalte Kuchl
43		Gamsfeld	2027	Salzburg	Salzkammergut Mountains	11.0; Donnerkogel	1,070; Gschütt Pass
44		Hohe Veitsch	1981	Styria	Mürzsteg Alps	12.7; Krautgartenkogel	728; Styrian Seeberg Pass
45		Hoher Nock	1963	Upper Austria	Upper Austrian Prealps	14.1; Warscheneck	999; West of Hengstpass
46		Sonntagshorn	1961	Salzburg / Bavaria (Germany)	Chiemgau Alps	10.3; Großes Häuselhorn	1,181; North of Vogeltenn
47		Hochstadl	1919	Styria	Ybbstal Alps	4.6; Riegerin	1,072; NW of Mariazell
48		Stuhleck	1782	Styria	Border mountains east of the Mur	14.0; Heukuppe	798; Semmering Pass
49		Großer Sulzberg	1400	Lower Austria	Türnitz Alps	7.8; Göller	430; Kernhofer Gscheid
50		Reisalpe	1399	Lower Austria	Gutenstein Alps	15.7; Obersberg	638 near Andersbach
51		Schöpfl	893	Lower Austria	Vienna Woods	9.9; Hocheck	312

== Highest mountain of each federal state ==
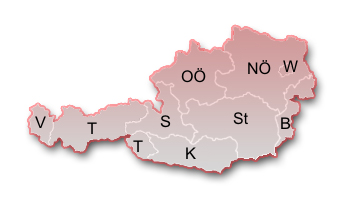
The states of Austria: B Burgenland, K Carinthia, NÖ Lower Austria, OÖ Upper Austria, S Salzburg, St Styria, T Tyrol, V Vorarlberg, W Vienna

Ranking	Image	Summit	Height (m AA)	Location	Range / Massif	Isolation (km)	Prominence (m)	State
1		Großglockner	3798	Carinthia / East Tyrol	Glockner Group; Hohe Tauern	175; Königspitze	2,424; Brenner Pass	Carinthia / Tyrol
2		Großvenediger	3662	East Tyrol / Salzburg	Venediger Group; Hohe Tauern	26.6; Großglockner	1,181; Felber Tauern	Salzburg
3		Piz Buin	3312	Vorarlberg / Graubünden (Switzerland)	Silvretta	6.1; Piz Linard	546; Futschöl Pass	Vorarlberg
4		Hoher Dachstein	2995	Upper Austria / Styria	Dachsteingebirge	48.0; Großer Hafner	2,136; Eben im Pongau	Upper Austria / Styria
5		Schneeberg	2076	Lower Austria	Rax-Schneeberg Group	49.2; Ringkamp	1,348; Kalte Kuchl	Lower Austria
6		Geschriebenstein	884	Burgenland	Günser Gebirge			Burgenland
7		Hermannskogel	542	Vienna	Vienna Woods			Vienna

== See also ==
- Mountains in the Austrian federal states:
  - Mountains in the Burgenland
  - Mountains of Carinthia
  - Mountains of Lower Austria
  - Mountains of Upper Austria
  - Mountains of Salzburg
  - Mountains of the Styria
  - Mountains of Tyrol
  - Mountains of Vorarlberg
  - Mountains of Vienna
- Mountains
  - List of mountains of the Alps above 3000 m
  - List of mountains of the Alps (2500-2999 m)
  - List of highest mountains of Germany
- Mountain ranges
  - List of mountain ranges
  - List of mountain and hill ranges of Germany

== Sources ==
- Bundesamt für Eich- und Vermessungswesen, Austrian Map online
- Günter Flaig, Silvretta Alpen, Bergverlag Rother, 2005, ISBN 978-3-7633-1097-5
- Walter Klier, Ötztaler Alpen, Bergverlag Rother, 2006, ISBN 978-3-7633-1123-1
- Walter Klier, Stubaier Alpen, Bergverlag Rother, 2006, ISBN 978-3-7633-1271-9
- Walter Klier, Zillertaler Alpen, Bergverlag Rother, 2005, ISBN 978-3-7633-1269-6
- Willi End and Hubert Peterka, Venedigergruppe, Bergverlag Rother, 2006, ISBN 978-3-7633-1242-9
- Willi End, Glockner- und Granatspitzgruppe, Bergverlag Rother, 2011, ISBN 978-3-7633-1266-5
- Classification of Eastern Alps are according to Mathias Zehring Alpenvereinseinteilung der Ostalpen, at bergalbum.de.
- Prominence data for the highest mountain of each range are from Eberhard Jurgalski's Table of summits in the Alps separated by 590 metres of re-ascent.
