= Sennkogel =

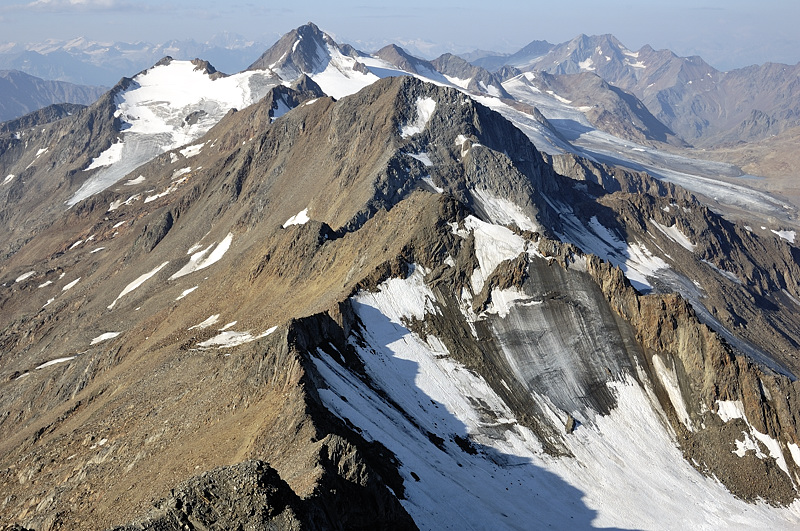
- Mt. Sennkogel as seen from Mt. Kreuzspitze

Highest point
- Elevation: 3,400 m (11,200 ft)
- Prominence: 171 m (561 ft)
- Parent peak: Fineilspitze
- Coordinates: 46°48′18″N 10°51′21″E

Geography
- Location within Austria
- Location: Tyrol, Austria
- Parent range: Ötztal Alps

Climbing
- First ascent: 22 June 1871 by E. J. Häberlin

The Sennkogel is a mountain in the Schnalskamm group of the Ötztal Alps.

Originally bearing the name 3rd Kreuzköpfe, the first ascendant, E.J. Häberlin from Frankfurt am Main suggested to rename it after Franz Senn, who had made many first ascents in the Ötztal Alps in the 1860s, including the neighboring Fineilspitze and Kreuzspitze, and the Fluchtkogel, Mutmalspitze, Firmisanschneide, Spiegelkogel, and Weißseespitze. The nomenclature was accepted by Heinrich Heß in his chapter on the Ötztal Alps in "Die Erschliessung der Ostalpen".
