= Kreuzspitze =

Kreuzspitze may refer to the following mountains in the Alps:

- Kreuzspitze (Ötztal Alps), a mountain in the Ötztal Alps (3,455 m)
- Kreuzspitze (Venediger Group), a mountain in the Venediger Group (3,164 m)
- Kreuzspitze (Tux Alps), a mountain in the Tux Alps (2,746 m)
- Kreuzspitze (Schober Group), a mountain in the Schober Group (2,937 m)
- Kreuzspitze (Stubai Alps), a mountain in the Stubai Alps (3,084 m)
- Kreuzspitze (Ammergau Alps), a mountain in the Ammergau Alps (2,185 m)
- Kreuzspitze (South Tyrol), a mountain in South Tyrol near La Val (2,021 m)
- Kreuzspitze (Allgäu Alps), a mountain in the Allgäu Alps (2,369 m).
