= Löcherkogel =

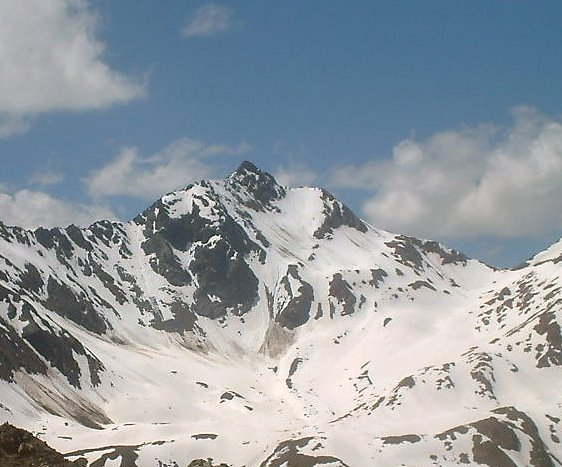
- Löcherkogel from the east

Highest point
- Elevation: 3,324 m (10,906 ft)
- Prominence: 235 m (771 ft)
- Parent peak: Eiskastenspitze (Bliggspitze)
- Coordinates: 46°57′33″N 10°47′29″E

Geography
- Location within Austria
- Location: Tyrol, Austria
- Parent range: Ötztal Alps

Climbing
- First ascent: 25 Sep 1900 by A. Hintner, F. Hörtnagl, J. Pircher, A. Posselt

The Löcherkogel is a mountain in the Kaunergrat group of the Ötztal Alps.
