= Talleitspitze =

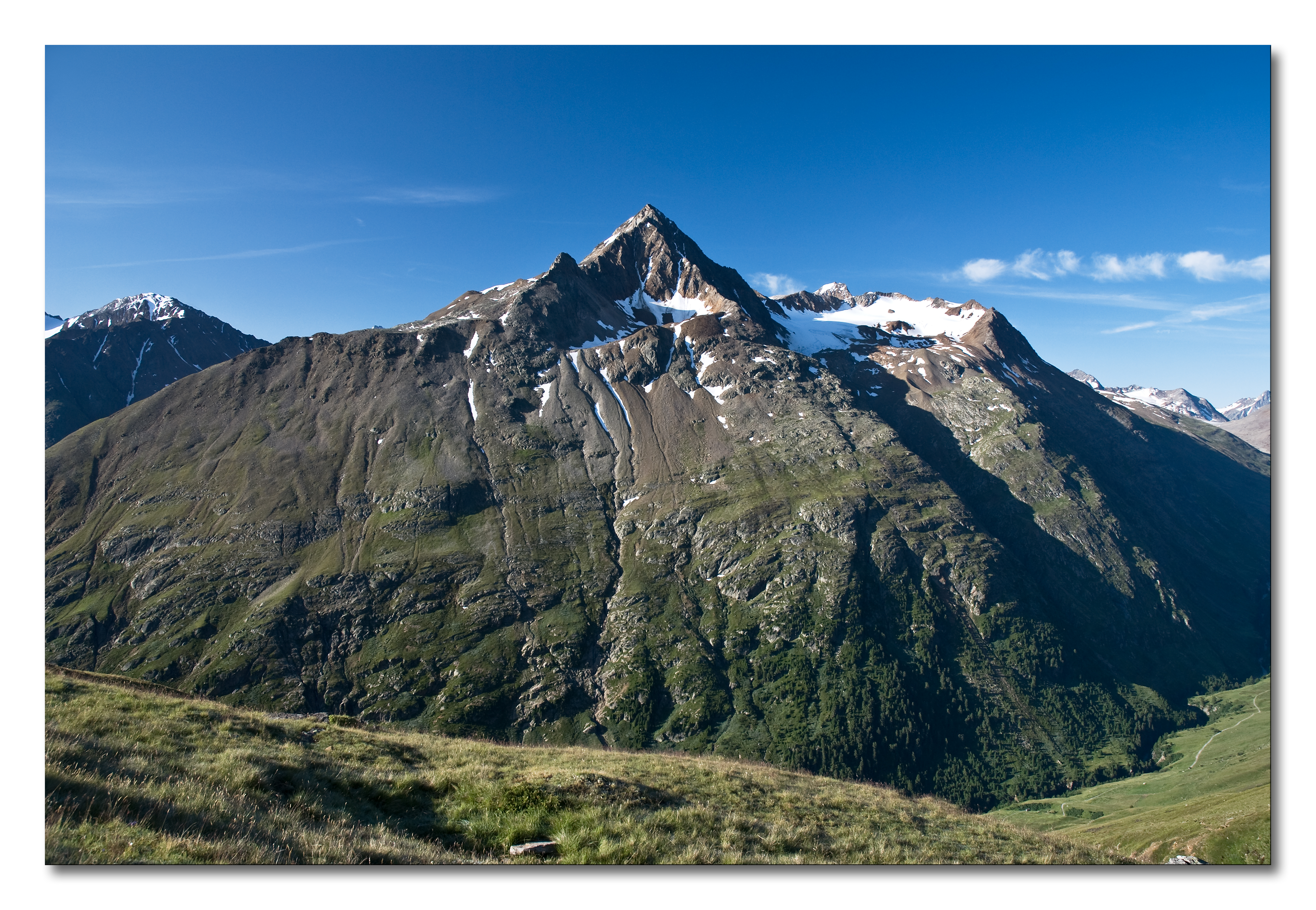

Highest point
- Elevation: 3,407 m (11,178 ft)
- Prominence: 177 m (581 ft)
- Parent peak: Kreuzspitze
- Coordinates: 46°49′59″N 10°53′13″E

Geography
- Location within Austria
- Location: Tyrol, Austria
- Parent range: Ötztal Alps

Climbing
- First ascent: 1811 by Franz Hauslab

The Talleitspitze is a mountain in the Schnalskamm group of the Ötztal Alps.
