= Äussere Schwarze Schneid =

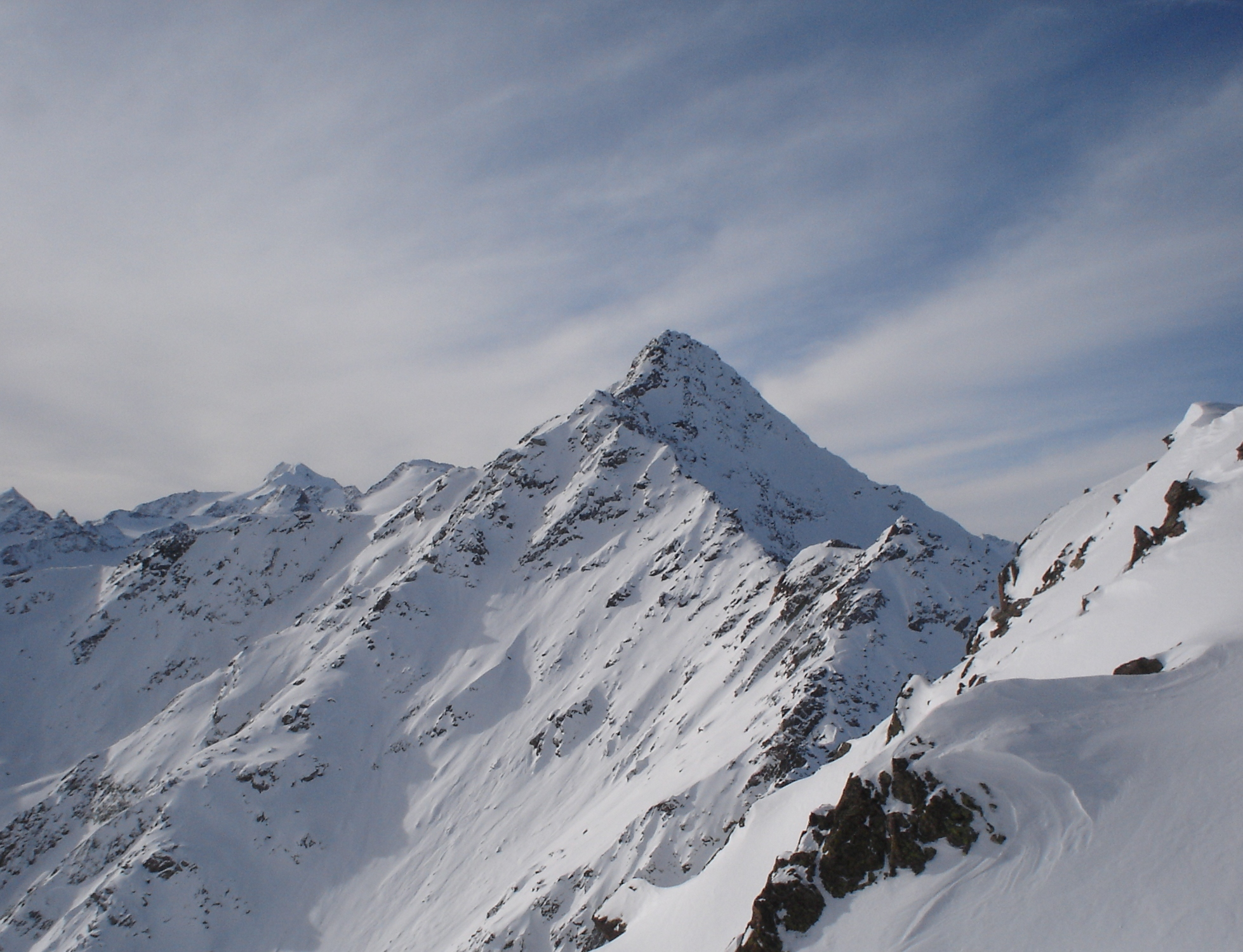
- Äussere Schwarze Schneid from the northeast from near the top of the Gaislachkogel.

Highest point
- Elevation: 3,257 m (10,686 ft)
- Prominence: 197 m (646 ft)
- Parent peak: Innere Schwarze Schneid
- Coordinates: 46°56′15″N 10°57′10″E

Geography
- Location within Austria
- Location: Tyrol, Austria
- Parent range: Ötztal Alps

Climbing
- Easiest route: East ridge (UIAA-I)

The Äussere Schwarze Schneid is a mountain in the Weisskamm group of the Ötztal Alps.
