= Hintere Ölgrubenspitze =

- Location within Austria

Highest point
- Elevation: 3,296 m (10,814 ft)
- Prominence: 186 m (610 ft)
- Parent peak: Nördliche Sexegertenspitze (Hochvernagtspitze)
- Coordinates: 46°53′27″N 10°46′31″E

Geography
- Location: Tyrol, Austria
- Parent range: Ötztal Alps

Climbing
- First ascent: 28 July 1871 by Theodor Petersen and E.J. Häberlin, guided by Alois Ennemoser and Gregor Klotz
- Easiest route: From the Gepatschhaus via the Ölgruben pass over the northeast ridge (UIAA-I)

The Hintere Ölgrubenspitze is a mountain in the Kaunergrat group of the Ötztal Alps.
