= Vordere Ölgrubenspitze =

Mountain

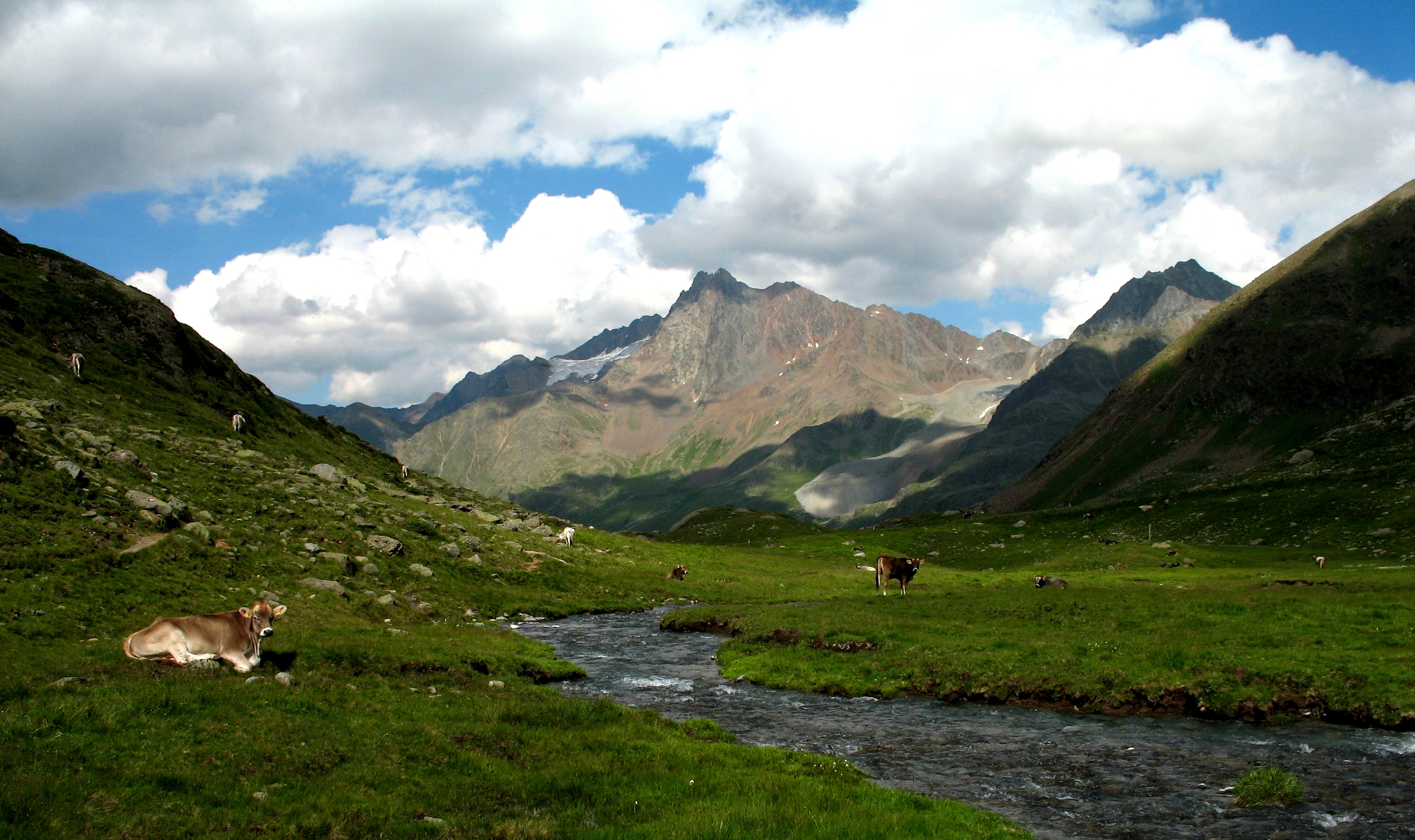
- View from the Krummgampental on the Ölgrubenspitze

Highest point
- Elevation: 3,456 m (11,339 ft)
- Prominence: 229 m (751 ft)
- Parent peak: Bliggspitze
- Coordinates: 46°54′29″N 10°46′25″E

Geography
- Location within Austria
- Location: Tyrol, Austria
- Parent range: Ötztal Alps

Climbing
- First ascent: 1876 by Johann Praxmarer, I. Schöpf, and "hostess of Gepatschhaus" mountain hut
- Easiest route: Southeast ridge from the Taschachhaus (UIAA-II)

The Vordere Ölgrubenspitze is a mountain in the Kaunergrat group of the Ötztal Alps.
