= Schwabenkopf =

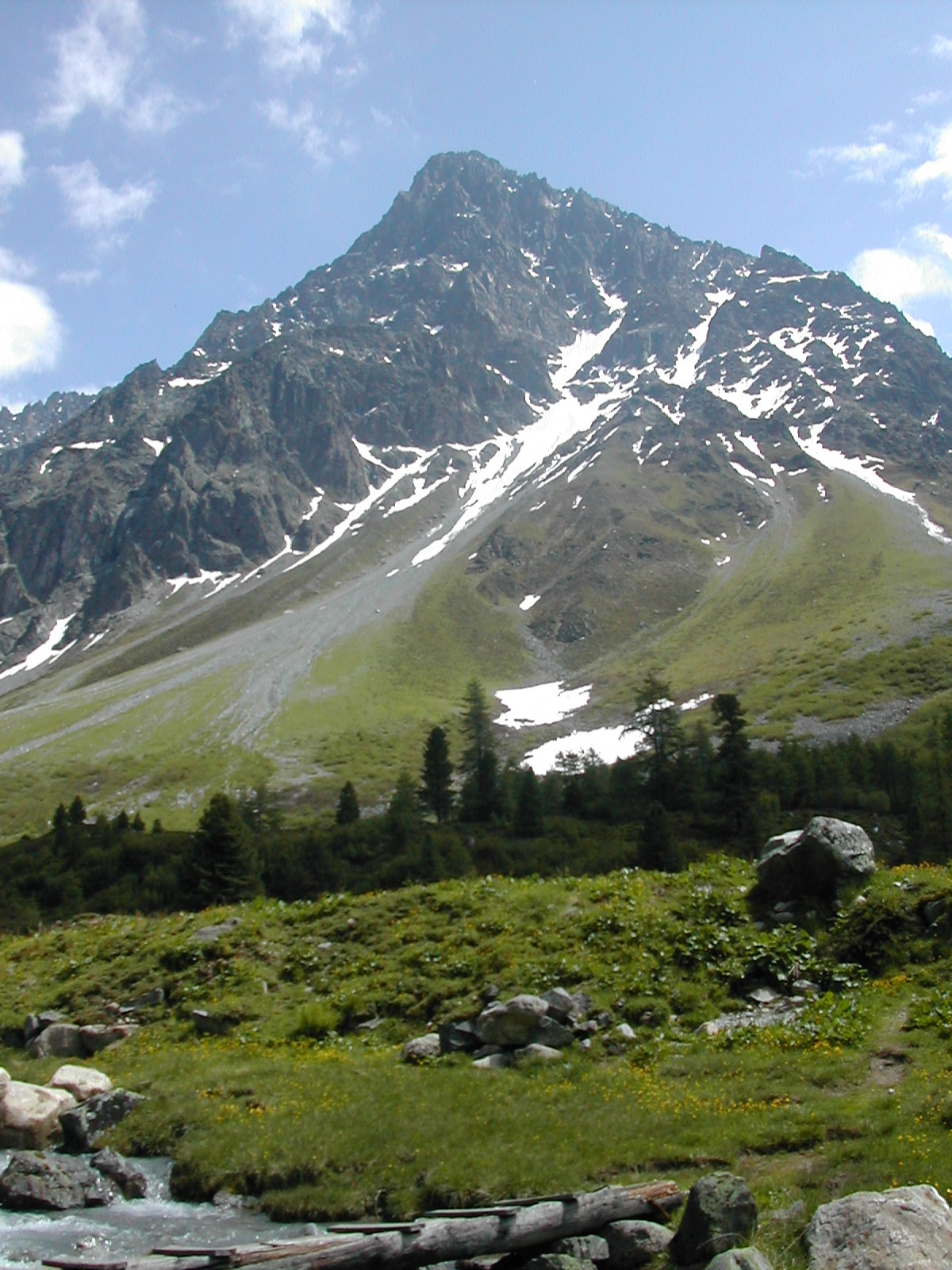

Highest point
- Elevation: 3,379 m (11,086 ft)
- Prominence: 178 m (584 ft)
- Parent peak: Verpeilspitze
- Coordinates: 47°00′23″N 10°47′38″E

Geography
- Location within Austria
- Location: Tyrol, Austria
- Parent range: Ötztal Alps

Climbing
- First ascent: 1892 by Theodor Petersen with the guides Johann Praxmarer and J. Penz

The Schwabenkopf is a mountain in the Kaunergrat group of the Ötztal Alps.
