= Mutmalspitze =

Mountain of the Ötztal Alps

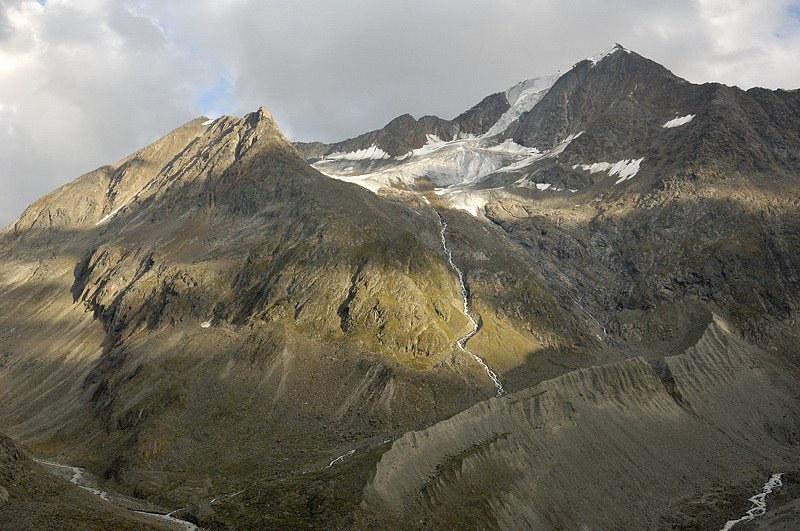

Highest point
- Elevation: 3,522 m (11,555 ft)
- Prominence: 130 m (430 ft)
- Parent peak: Hintere Schwärze
- Coordinates: 46°46′58″N 10°54′27″E

Geography
- Location within Austria
- Location: Tyrol, Austria
- Parent range: Ötztal Alps

Climbing
- First ascent: 28 Jul 1868 by V. Kaltdorff with Franz Senn or G. Spechtenhauser
- Easiest route: Southeast ridge from the Martin Busch Hütte

The Mutmalspitze is a mountain in the Schnalskamm group of the Ötztal Alps.
