= Verpeilspitze =

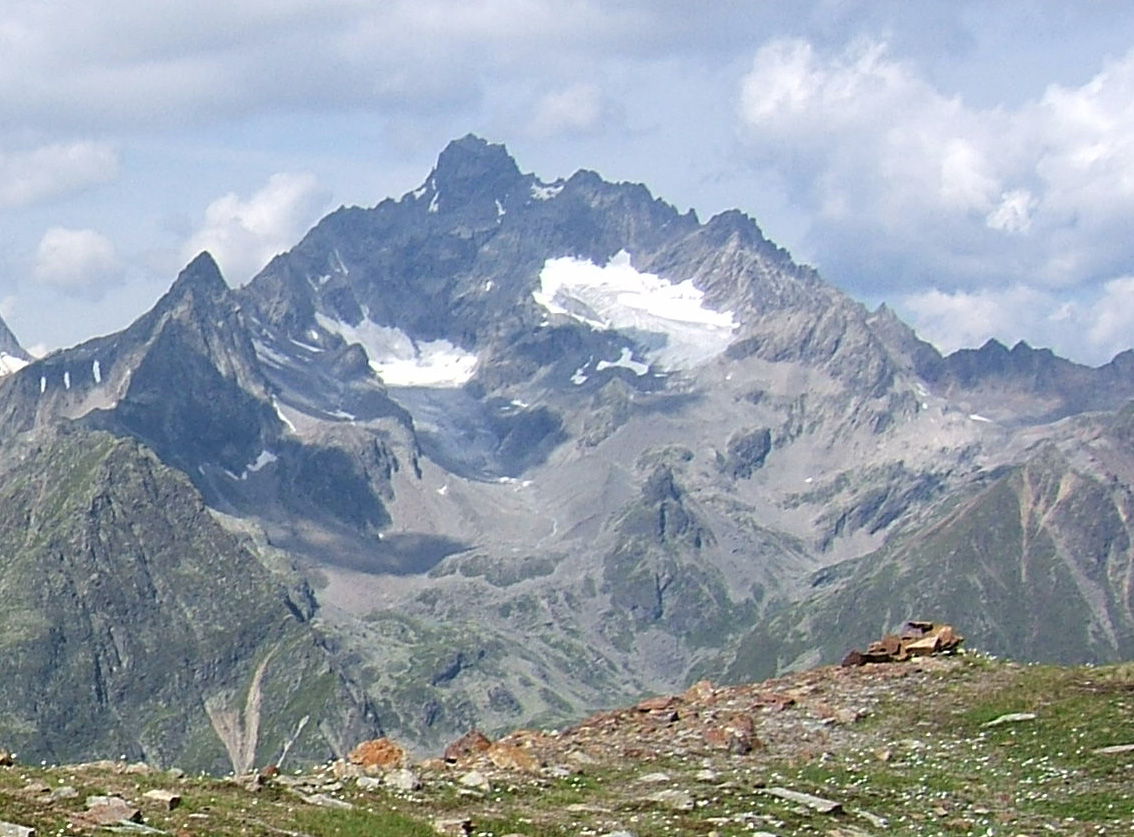
- Verpeilspitze from the east over the Pitz valley from Gahwinden (2648m)

Highest point
- Elevation: 3,425 m (11,237 ft)
- Prominence: 405 m (1,329 ft)
- Parent peak: Watzespitze
- Listing: Alpine mountains above 3000 m
- Coordinates: 47°00′12″N 10°48′18″E

Geography
- Location within Austria
- Location: Tyrol, Austria
- Parent range: Ötztal Alps

Climbing
- First ascent: 4 Sep 1886 by Theodor Petersen, Anna Voigt, Stefan Kirschner, Johann Penz and Johann Praxmarer
- Easiest route: Southwest face and southeast ridge from the Kaunergrat Hütte (UIAA-II+)

The Verpeilspitze is a mountain in the Kaunergrat group of the Ötztal Alps.

== Gallery ==
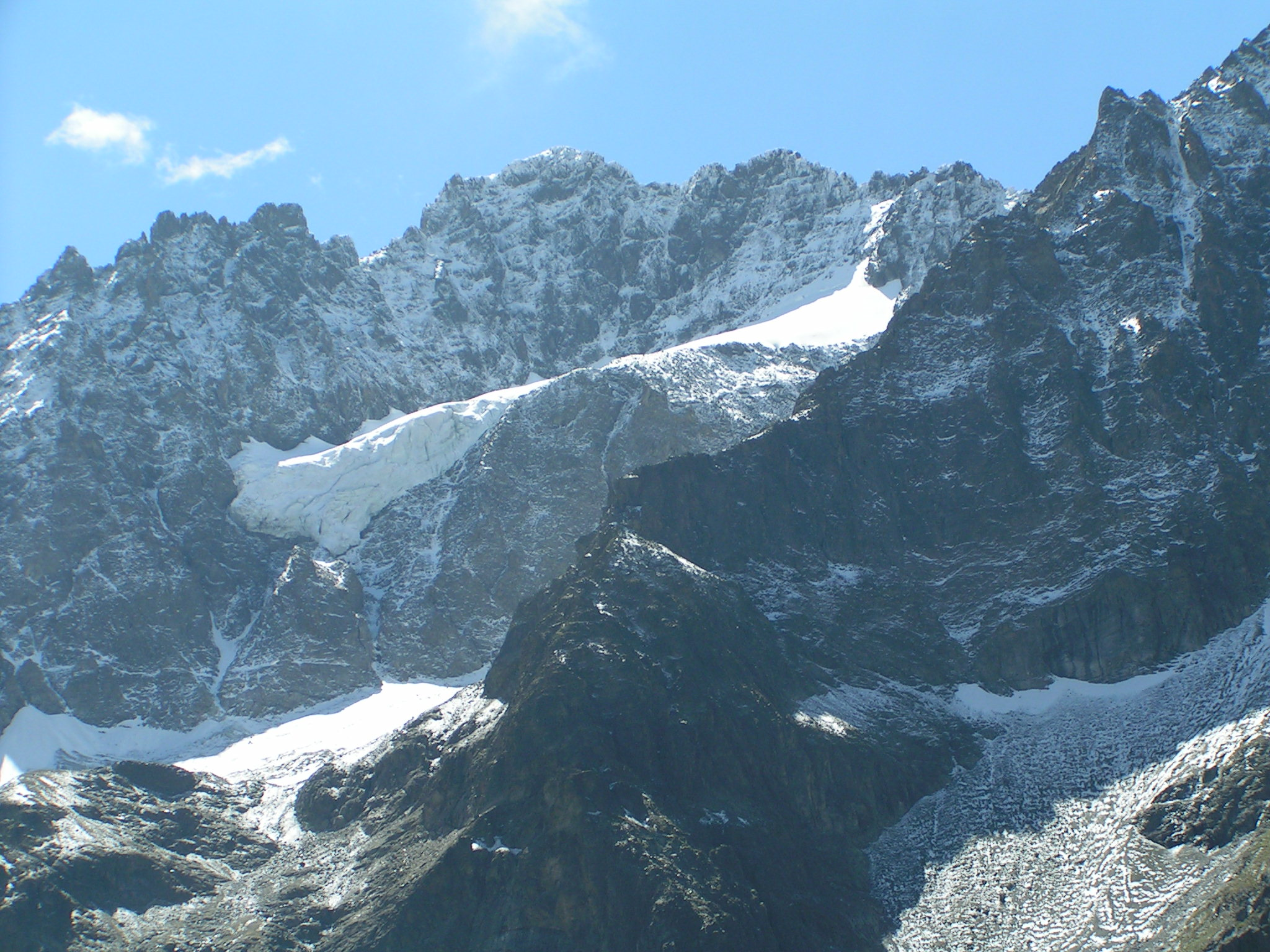
The Verpeilspitze on the left with the Verpeilferner in the middle

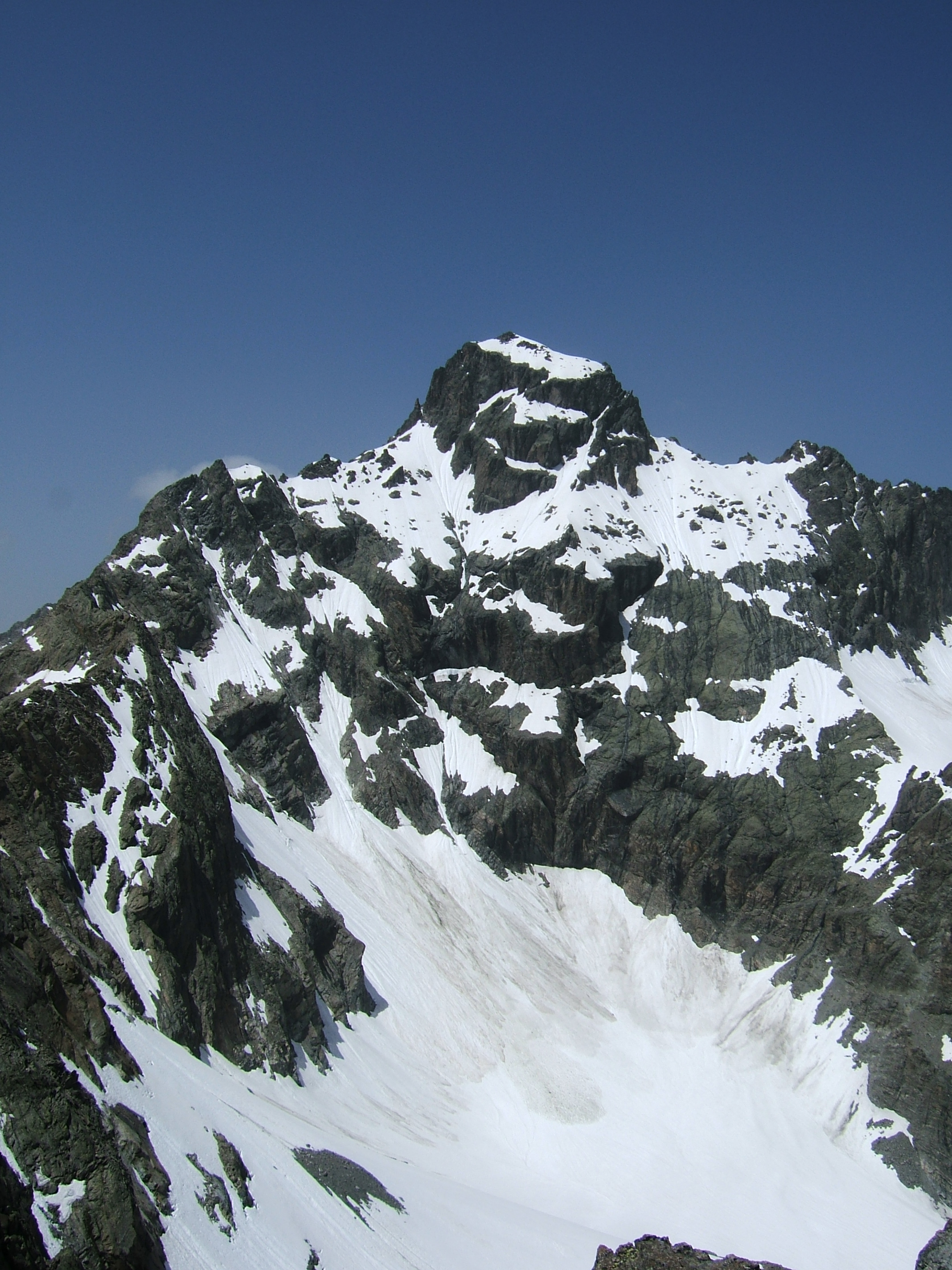
Verpeilspitze from southeast, from Parstleswand

== See also ==
- List of mountains of the Alps
