= Gamsfeld =

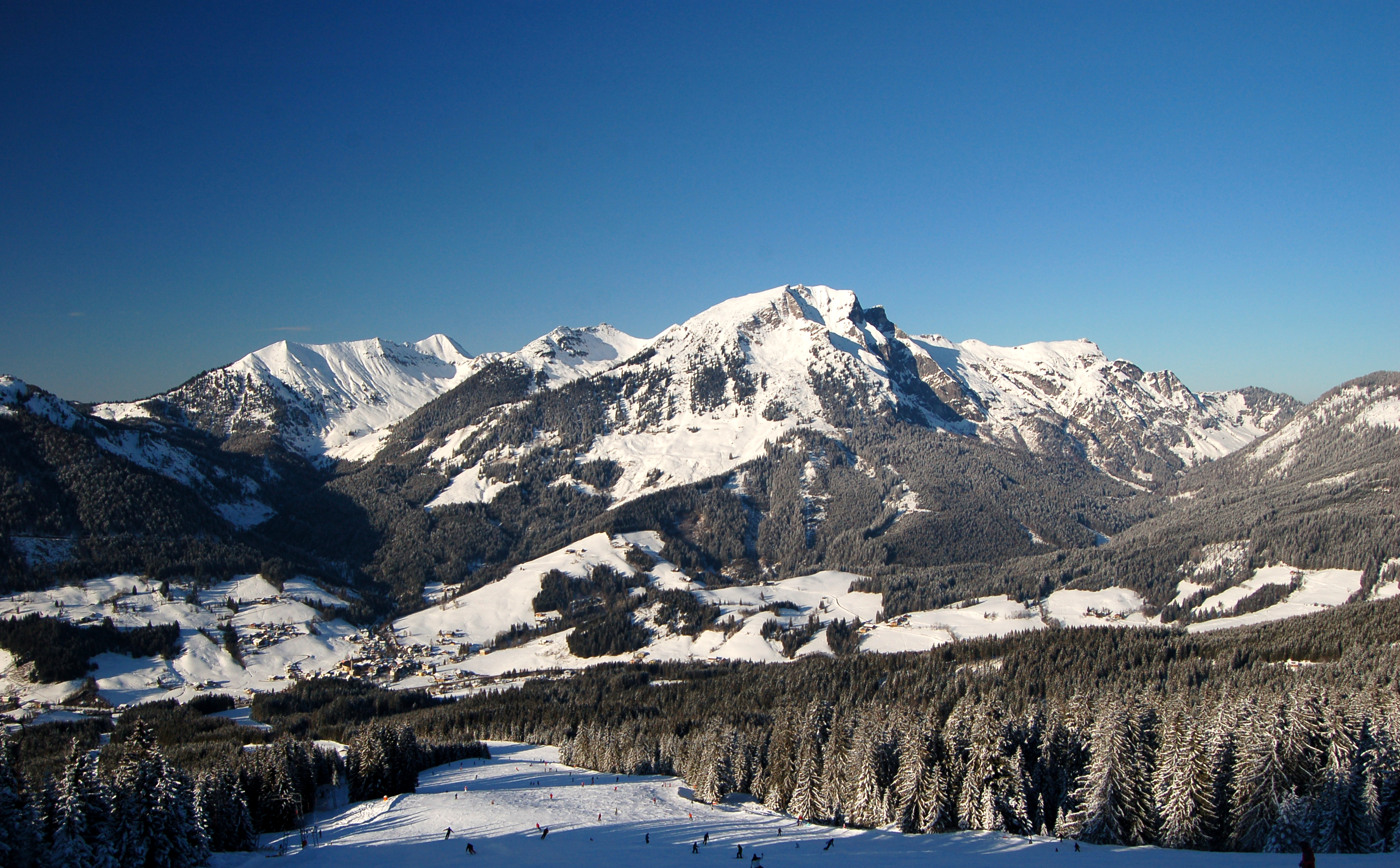
- Gamsfeld (centre)

Highest point
- Elevation: 2,027 m (6,650 ft)
- Prominence: 1,070 m (3,510 ft)
- Coordinates: 47°37′N 13°29′E

Geography
- Location within Alps
- Location: Salzburg, Austria
- Parent range: Salzkammergut Mountains

Gamsfeld (2,027 m) is a mountain in Salzburg, Austria. It is the highest peak of the Salzkammergut Mountains, a sub-range of the Northern Limestone Alps. The mountain is located near the village of Rußbach, which lies 1,200 m below its summit, and is a popular peak for hiking and ski touring. It also provides a great vantage point for the nearby Dachstein Mountains.
