= Eben im Pongau =

- Municipality
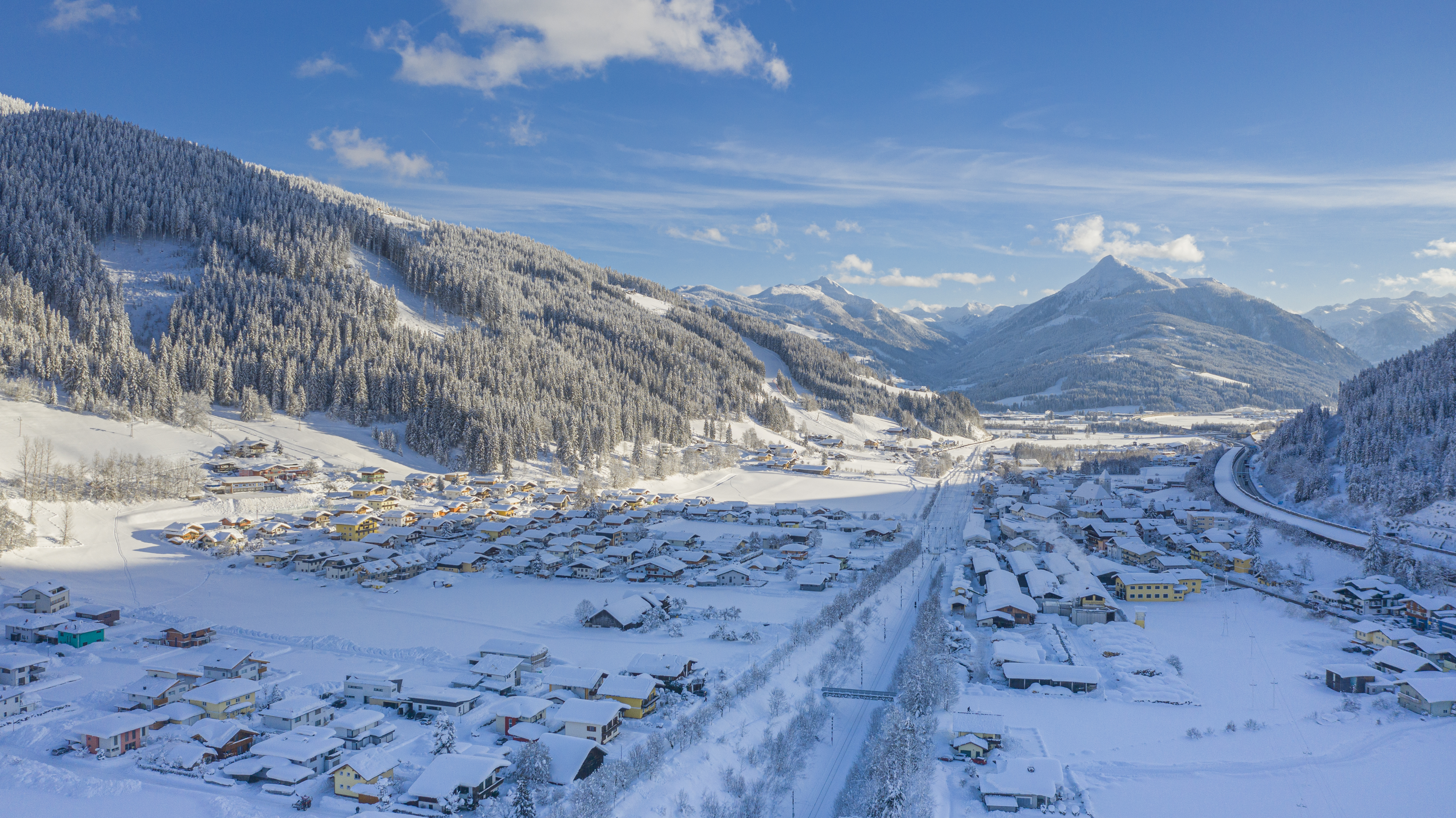
- Eben im Pongau

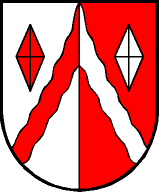
- Coat of arms

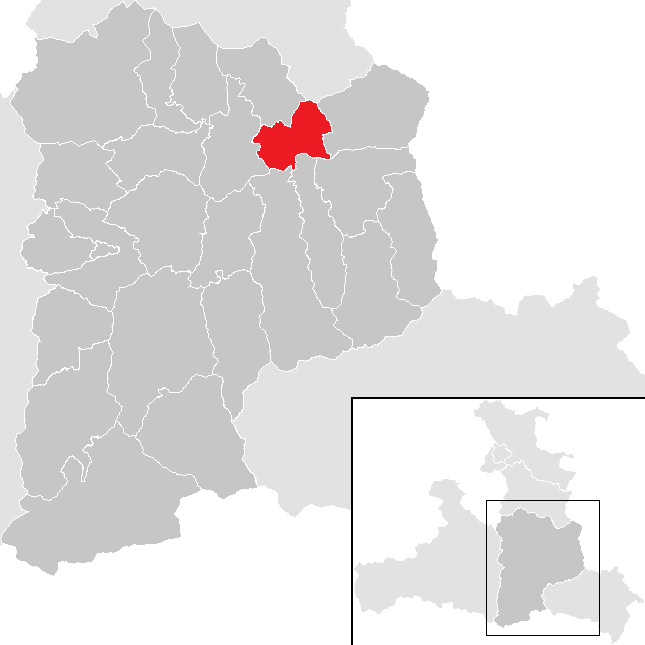
- Location within St. Johann im Pongau district

- Location within Austria
- Coordinates: 47°24′0″N 13°24′0″E
- Country: Austria
- State: Salzburg
- District: St. Johann im Pongau

Government
  - Mayor: Herbert Farmer (ÖVP)

Area
  - Total: 35.91 km^{2} (13.86 sq mi)
- Elevation: 862 m (2,828 ft)

Population (2018-01-01)
  - Total: 2,446
  - Density: 68.11/km^{2} (176.4/sq mi)
- Time zone: UTC+1 (CET)
  - Summer (DST): UTC+2 (CEST)
- Postal code: 5531
- Area code: 06458
- Vehicle registration: JO
- Website: www.eben.salzburg.at

Eben im Pongau is a municipality in the St. Johann im Pongau district in the Austrian state of Salzburg.

== Geography ==
The municipality lies on the northwest edge of the Radstadt basin in the Ennspongau. To the south is the valley of the upper Enns, towards Altenmarkt im Pongau and Flachau. To the north is the valley of the Fritzbach. To the west is the Pongau basin, and to the east is Filzmoos. It is thus on the divide between the Salzach watershed and the Enns.
