= Langtauferer Spitze =

Mountain in Italy

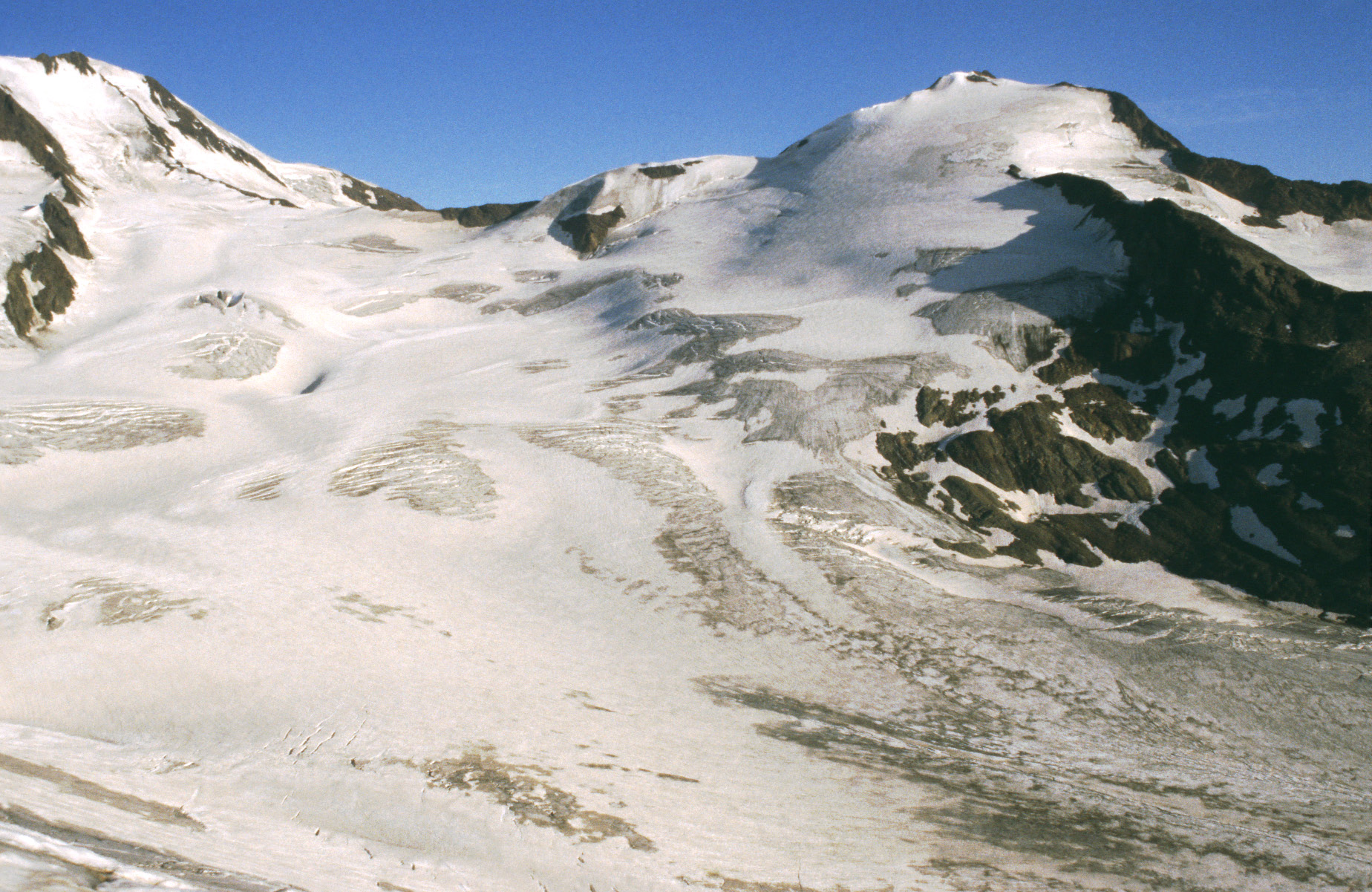
- Langtauferer Spitze from the southeast over the Hintereisferner. All the way on the left is the Weißkugel.

Highest point
- Elevation: 3,529 m (11,578 ft)
- Prominence: 177 m (581 ft)
- Parent peak: Weißkugel
- Coordinates: 46°48′17″N 10°44′45″E

Geography
- Location within Austria
- Location: Tyrol, Austria / South Tyrol, Italy
- Parent range: Ötztal Alps

Climbing
- First ascent: 1865 by D. W. Freshfield, W. H. Fox, F. F. Tuckett, F. Devouassoud and P. Michel

The Langtauferer Spitze is a mountain in the Weisskamm group of the Ötztal Alps on the border between Tyrol, Austria, and South Tyrol, Italy.
