= Crusc de Rit =

Mountain in Italy

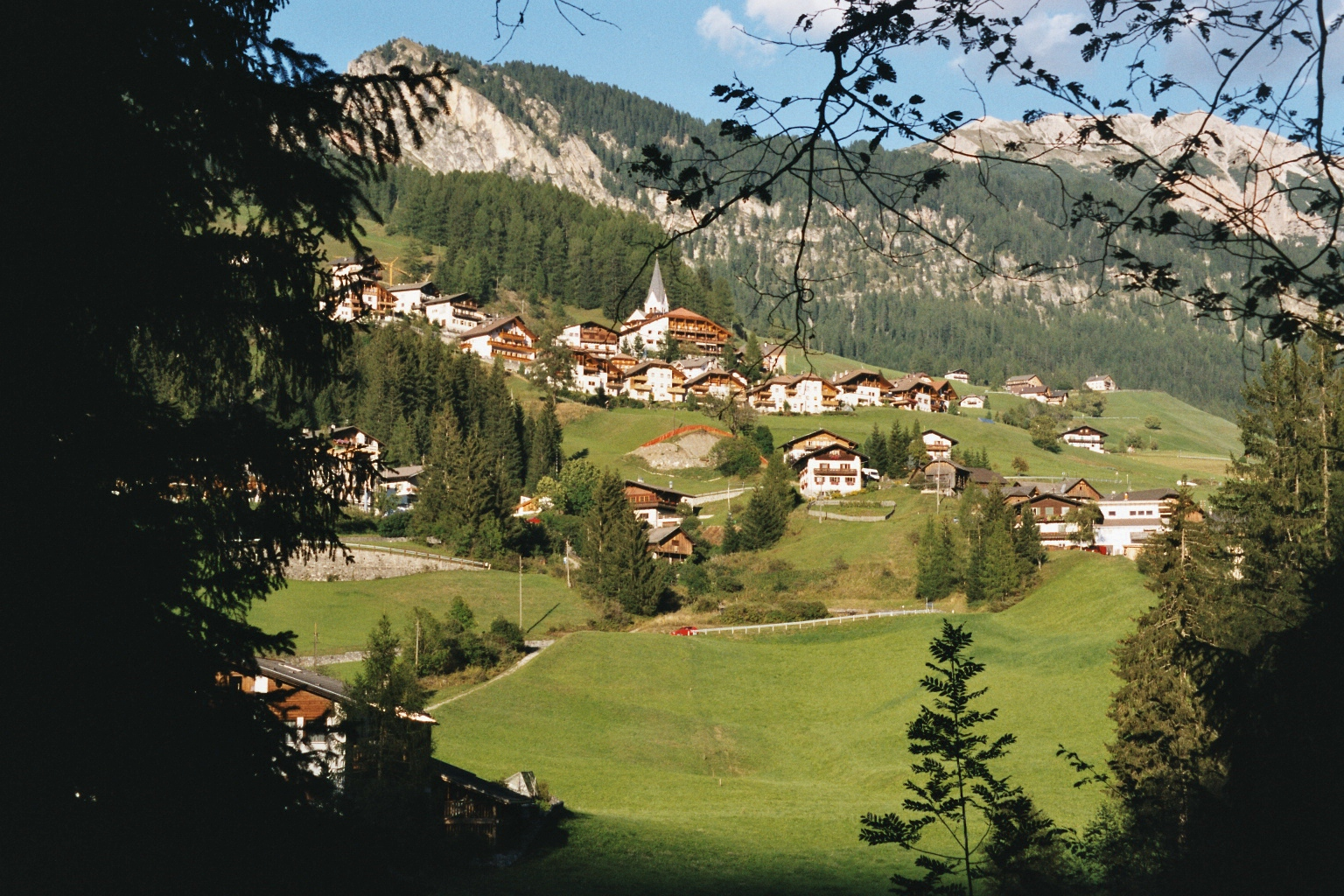
- Crusc de Rit to the left

Highest point
- Elevation: 2,021 m (6,631 ft)
- Coordinates: 46°39′54″N 11°57′18″E

Geography
- Location: South Tyrol, Italy
- Parent range: Dolomites

The Crusc de Rit (Italian: Monte Croce [ˈmonte ˈkroːtʃe]; German: Kreuzspitze) is a mountain in the Dolomites in South Tyrol, Italy.
