= Fluchtkogel =

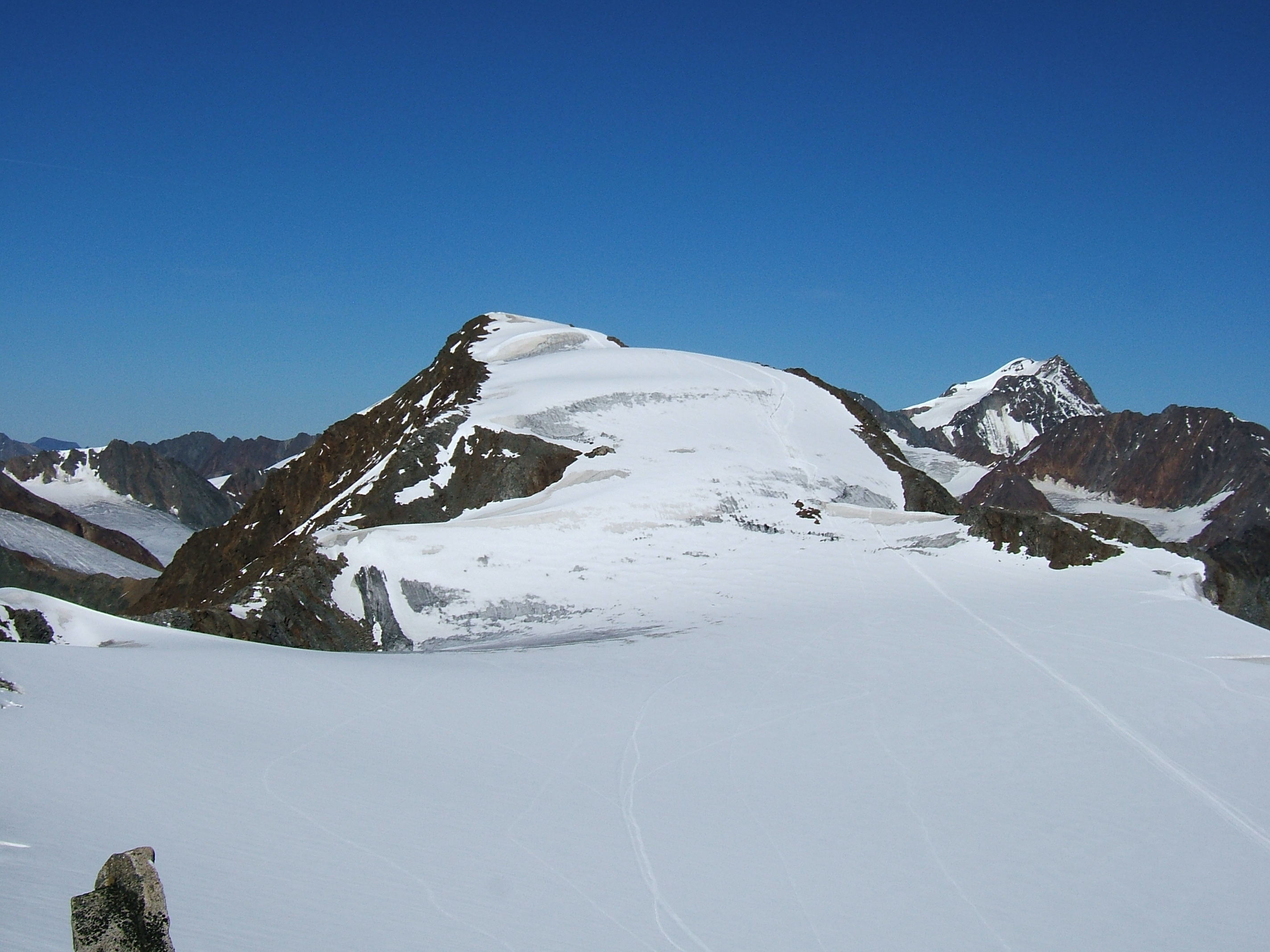
- Fluchtkogel from the southwest from the Dahmannspitze, with Wildspitze in the background.

Highest point
- Elevation: 3,500 m (11,500 ft)
- Prominence: 256 m (840 ft)
- Parent peak: Hochvernagtspitze
- Coordinates: 46°51′28″N 10°47′33″E

Geography
- Location within Austria
- Location: Tyrol, Austria
- Parent range: Ötztal Alps

Climbing
- First ascent: 19 Jul 1869 by Valentin Kaltdorff, Franz Senn and J. Scholz with the guides Alois Ennemoser und Gabriel Spechtenhauser
- Easiest route: Over the southwest face.

The Fluchtkogel is a mountain in the Weisskamm group of the Ötztal Alps.
