= Plattigkopf =

- Location within Austria

Highest point
- Elevation: 3,174 m (10,413 ft)
- Prominence: 230 m (750 ft)
- Parent peak: Glockturm
- Coordinates: 46°55′38″N 10°40′36″E

Geography
- Location: Tyrol, Austria
- Parent range: Ötztal Alps

The Plattigkopf is a mountain in the Glockturmkamm group of the Ötztal Alps.
