= Hochvernagtspitze =

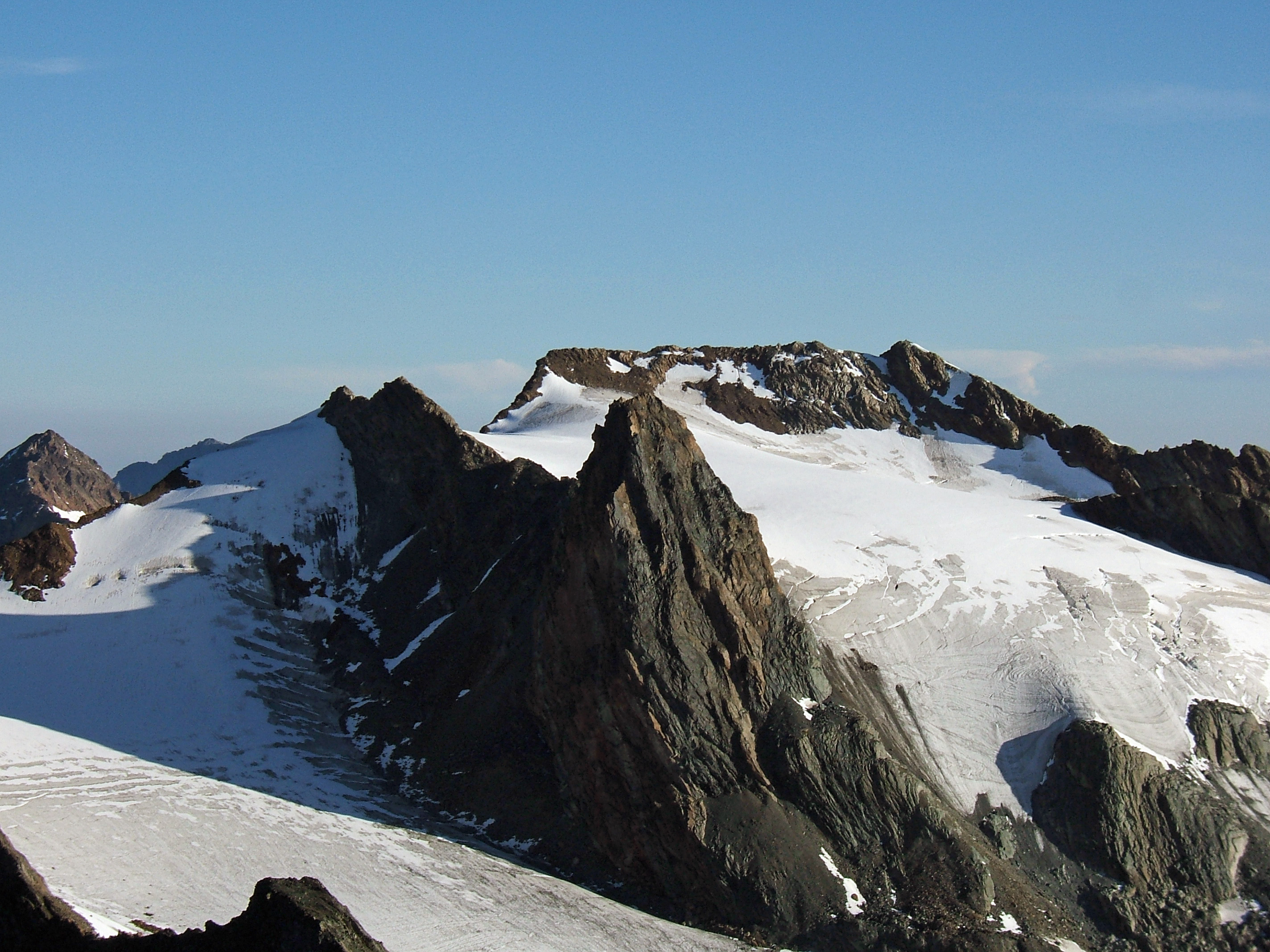
- Hochvernagtspitze from the south as seen from Fluchtkogel, with Bliggspitze in the background on the left.

Highest point
- Elevation: 3,535 m (11,598 ft)
- Prominence: 299 m (981 ft)
- Parent peak: Hinterer Brochkogel (Wildspitze)
- Listing: Alpine mountains above 3000 m
- Coordinates: 46°52′53″N 10°47′46″E

Geography
- Location within Austria
- Location: Tyrol, Austria
- Parent range: Ötztal Alps

Climbing
- First ascent: 9 Sep 1865 by Franz Senn, E. Neurauter und C. Granbichler
- Easiest route: From the southeast over the Vernagtferner (glacier)

The Hochvernagtspitze is a mountain in the Weisskamm group of the Ötztal Alps.
