= Eiskastenspitze =

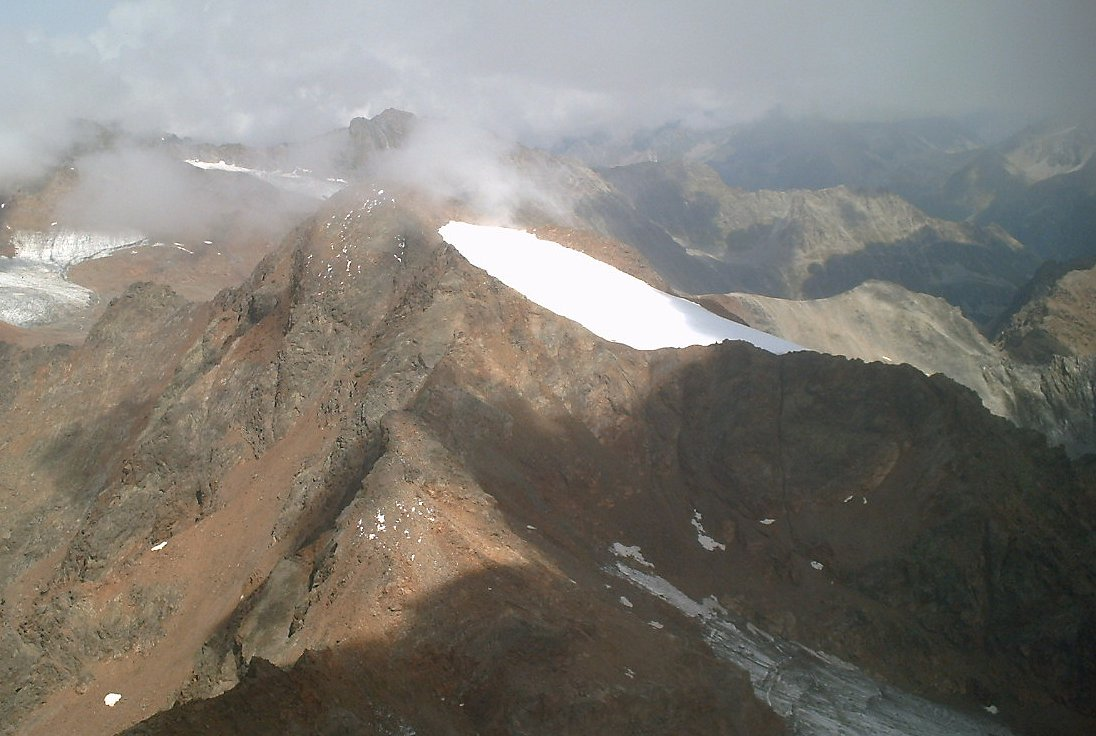
- Eiskastenspitze from the south from the Bliggspitze

Highest point
- Elevation: 3,373 m (11,066 ft)
- Prominence: 207 m (679 ft)
- Parent peak: Bliggspitze
- Coordinates: 46°55′49″N 10°47′31″E

Geography
- Location within Austria
- Location: Tyrol, Austria
- Parent range: Ötztal Alps

Climbing
- First ascent: 1853 by During a geological survey

The Eiskastenspitze is a mountain in the Kaunergrat group of the Ötztal Alps.
