= Karlesspitze =

Mountain in Italy

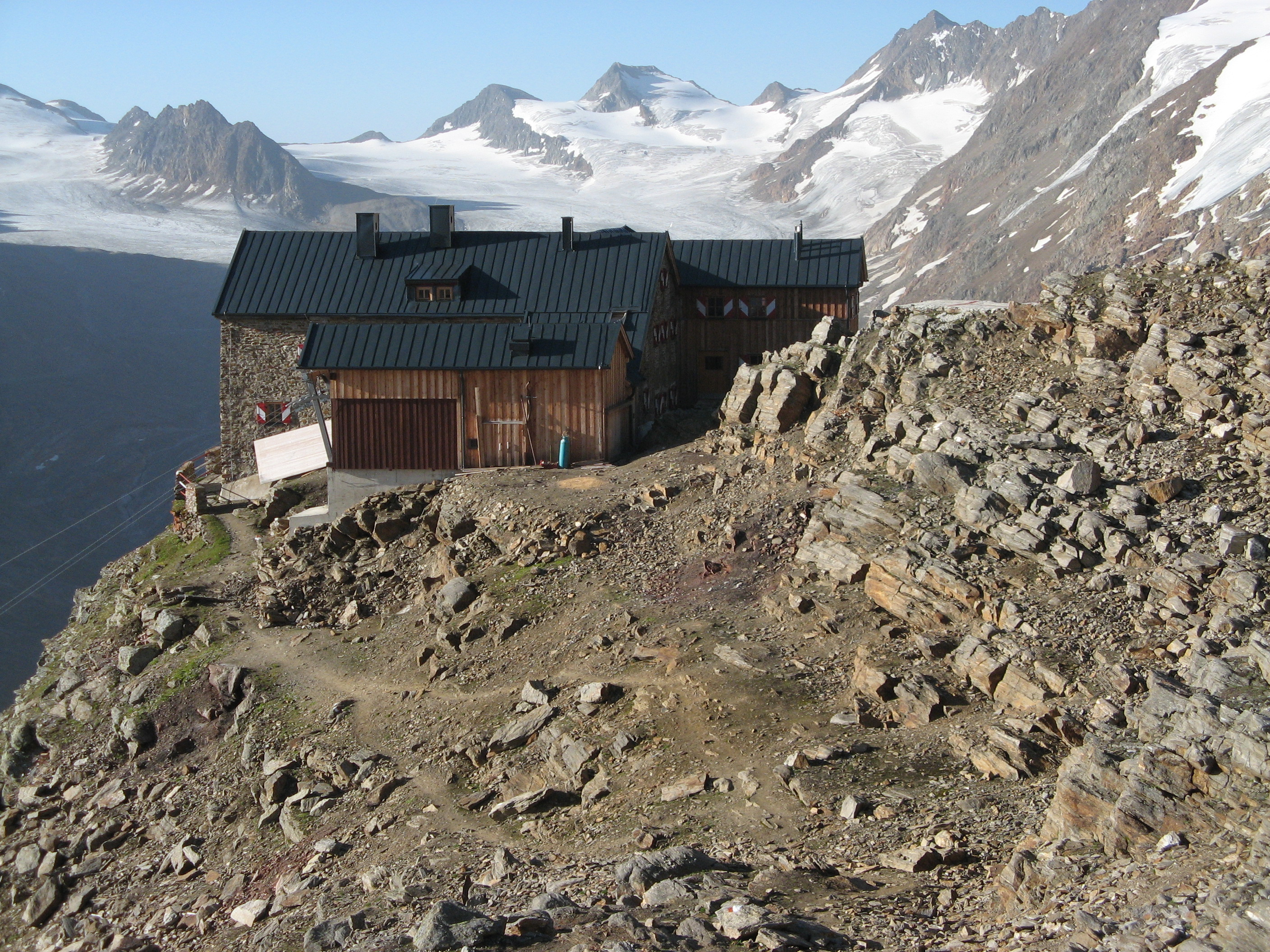
- Ramolhaus in front of the Gurgler Ferner (glacier). Karlesspitze is the peak on the right.

Highest point
- Elevation: 3,465 m (11,368 ft)
- Prominence: 185 m (607 ft)
- Parent peak: Schalfkogel
- Coordinates: 46°46′20″N 10°58′30″E

Geography
- Location within Austria
- Location: Tyrol, Austria / South Tyrol, Italy
- Parent range: Ötztal Alps

Climbing
- First ascent: 1869 by A. Marshall, B. Grüner, P. Gstrein
- Easiest route: Glacier tour

The Karlesspitze or Grubspitze is a mountain in the Schnalskamm group of the Ötztal Alps on the border between Tyrol, Austria, and South Tyrol, Italy.
