= Hoher Seeblaskogel =

Mountain in Austria

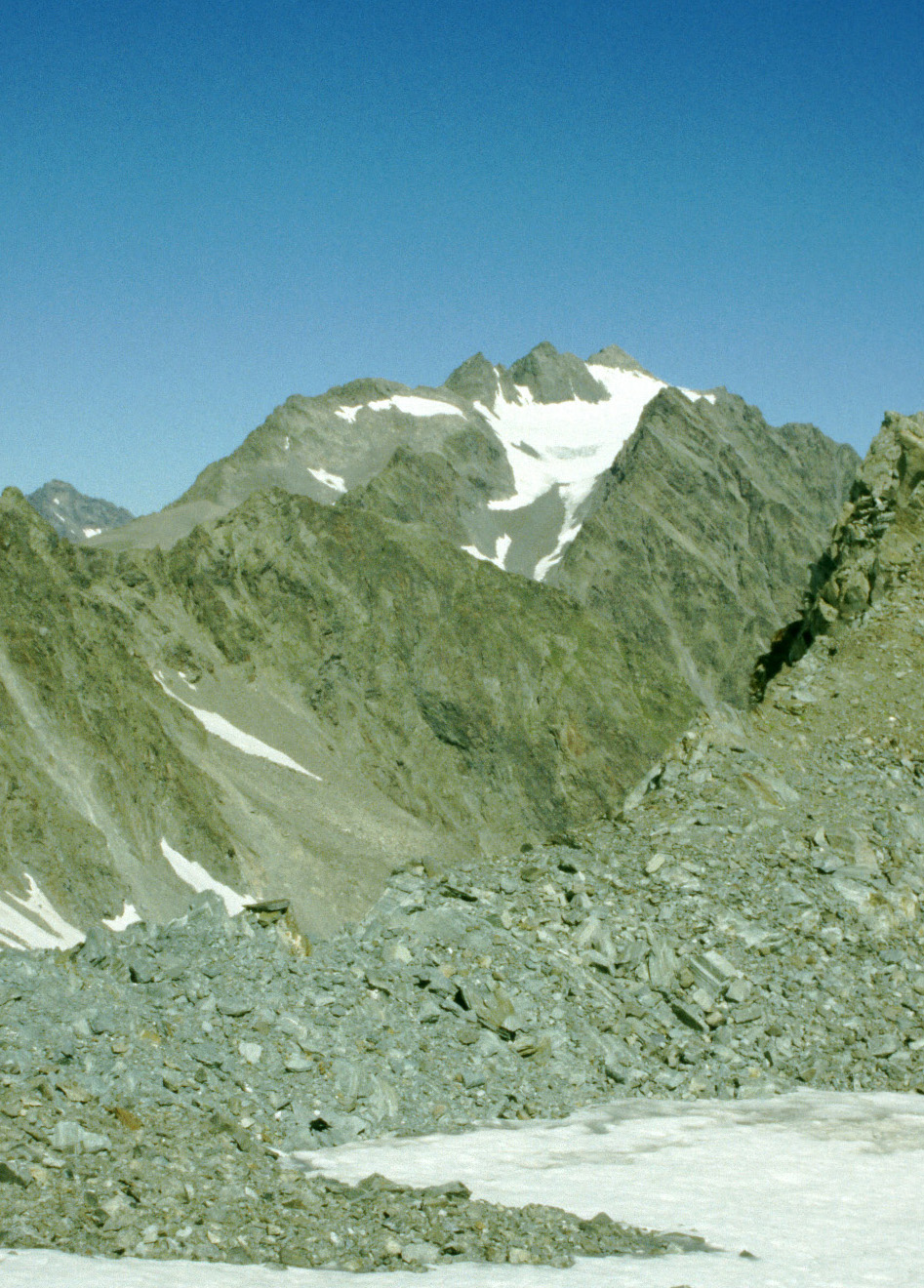
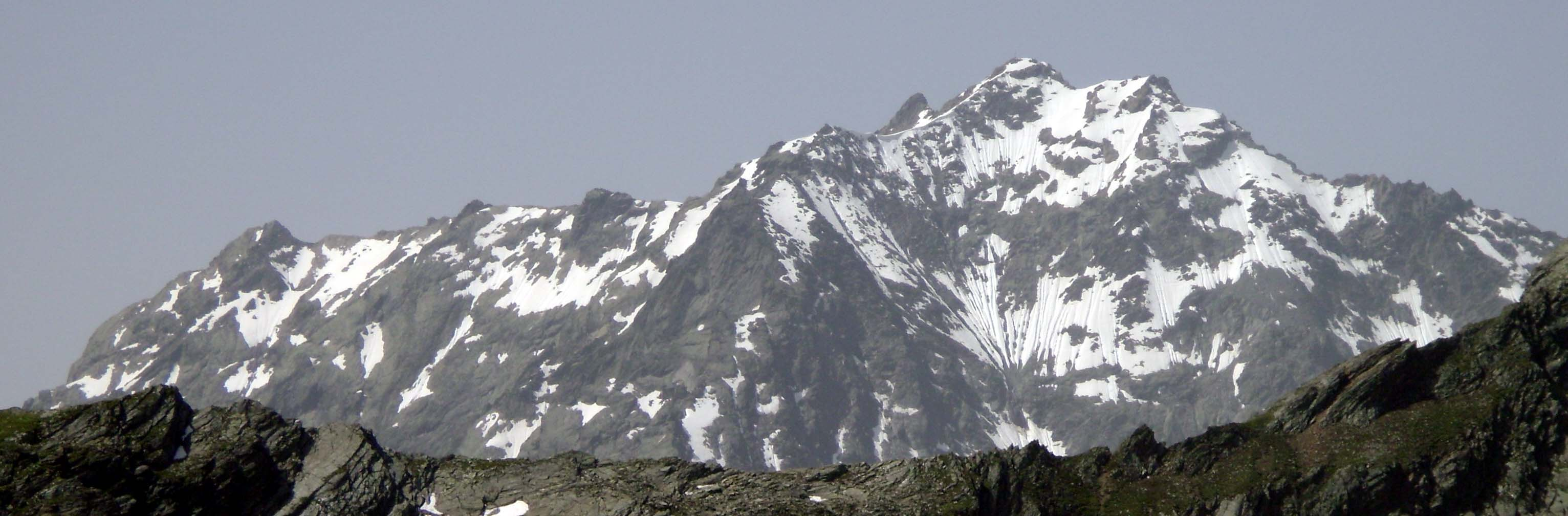
- The Hoher Seeblaskogel from the Längentaler Ferner glacier to the south The Hoher Seeblaskogel from the northeast

Highest point
- Elevation: 3,235 m (AA) (10,614 ft)
- Prominence: 374 m ↓ Bachfallenscharte col
- Isolation: 2.6 km → Vorderer Brunnenkogel
- Listing: Alpine mountains above 3000 m
- Coordinates: 47°05′44″N 11°04′29″E

Geography
- Location within Austria
- Location: Tyrol, Austria
- Parent range: Stubai Alps

Geology
- Rock type: Winnebach migmatite

Climbing
- First ascent: 20 August 1881 by L. Purtscheller and J. Schnaiter up the west flank
- Normal route: From the south over the Grüne-Tatzen-Ferner glacier and the eastern arête

The Hoher Seeblaskogel is a mountain, 3,235 m (AA), in the western part of the Stubai Alps in the Austrian state of Tyrol. Its independent summit lies between the cols of Winnebachjoch and Bachfallenscharte. To the south the Grüne-Tatzen glacier climbs to just below the summit. The Seeblaskogel has rock faces on all sides, below which lie the glaciers of Ochsenkarferner to the north and Seeblaskogelferner to the east.

The summit may be reached either from the Winnebachsee Hut or the Westfalenhaus. The two easiest routes from these huts both meet in an approach from the south over the relatively safe Grüne-Tatzen-Ferner glacier before making their way along the rather exposed eastern arête classified as UIAA grade I. All other routes, especially the north face (UIAA grade IV) involve climbing.

== Literature and maps ==
- Richard Goedeke: 3000er in den Nordalpen. Bruckmann, Munich, 2004, ISBN 3-7654-3930-4
- Walter Klier: Stubaier Alpen, Alpine Club Guide, Bergverlag Rudolf Rother, Munich, 2006, ISBN 3-7633-1271-4
- Alpine Club map, Sheet 31/2, 1:25,000 series, Stubaier Alpen; Sellrain, ISBN 3-928777-73-4
