= Pfitscherjoch =

Pfitscher Joch
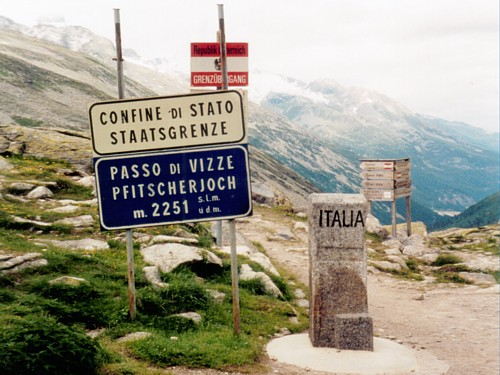
- Interactive map of Pfitscher Joch
- Elevation: 2,246 metres (7,369 ft)

Third Approach
- Location: Tyrol, Austria– South Tyrol, Italy
- Range: Zillertal Alps
- Coordinates: 46°59′42″N 11°39′37″E

The Pfitscherjoch (Italian: Passo di Vizze; German: Pfitscherjoch) is a mountain pass in the Zillertal Alps on the border between Tyrol, Austria, and South Tyrol, Italy.

Since the Treaty of Saint-Germain came into force in 1920, the border between Italy and Austria has run over the Pfitscherjoch.

== See also ==
- List of highest paved roads in Europe
- List of mountain passes
