= Watzespitze =

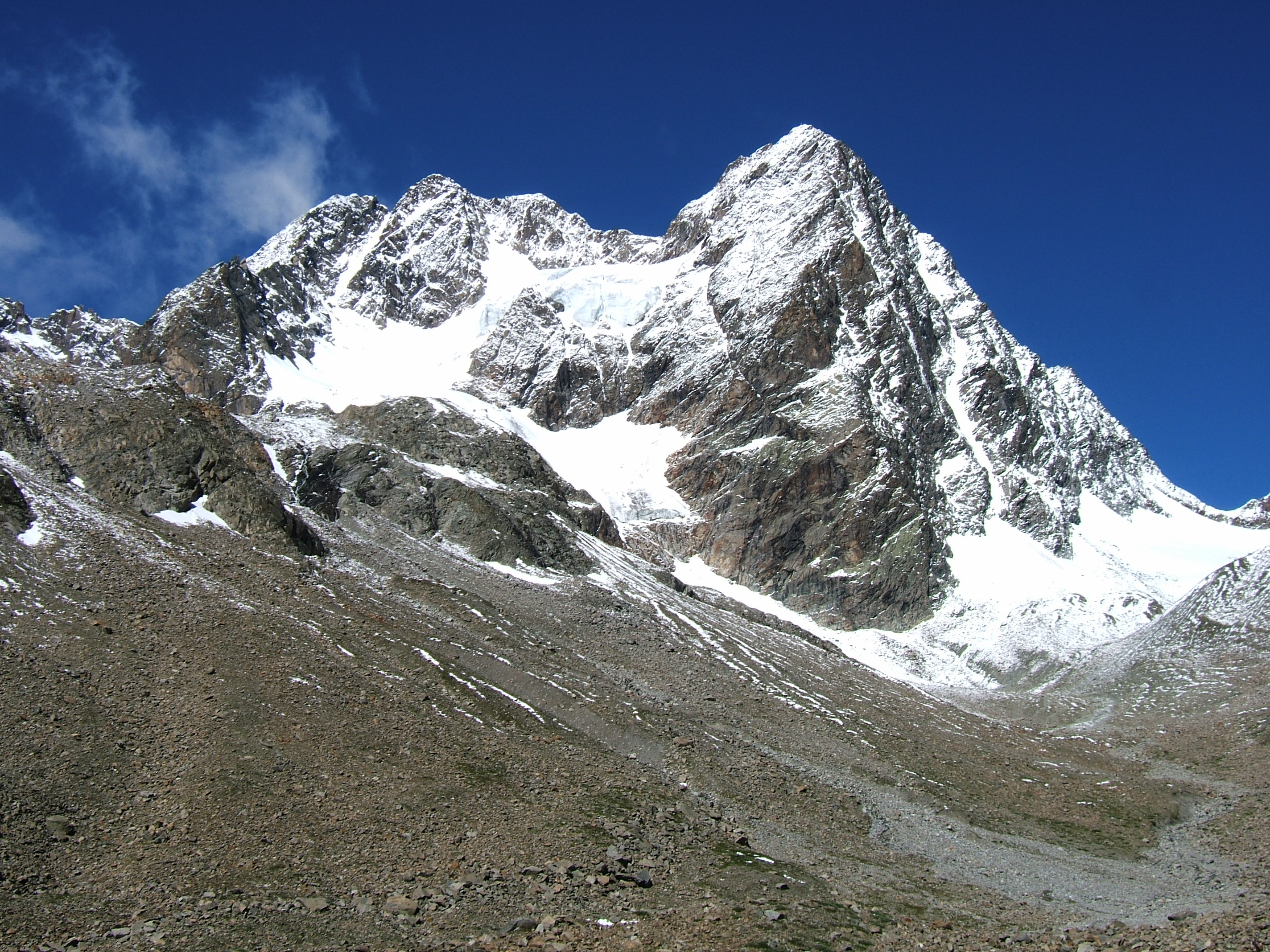
- Watzespitze from the East

Highest point
- Elevation: 3,533 m (11,591 ft)
- Prominence: 491 m (1,611 ft)
- Parent peak: Hochvernagtspitze (Wildspitze)
- Listing: Alpine mountains above 3000 m
- Coordinates: 46°59′22″N 10°47′44″E

Geography
- Location within Austria
- Location: Tyrol, Austria
- Parent range: Ötztal Alps

Climbing
- First ascent: 29 Sep 1869 by Alois Ennemoser
- Easiest route: East glacier route from the Kaunergrat Hütte (UIAA-II)

The Watzespitze or Waze (3,533m) is the highest mountain in the Kaunergrat group of the Ötztal Alps. It is located in Tyrol, Austria. The mountain has two summits, the main summit and the south summit at 3,503m. It is located between the valleys of Kaunertal in the east and Pitztal in the west. The mountain is a challenging climb due to its hanging glaciers and steep ridges.

== Gallery ==
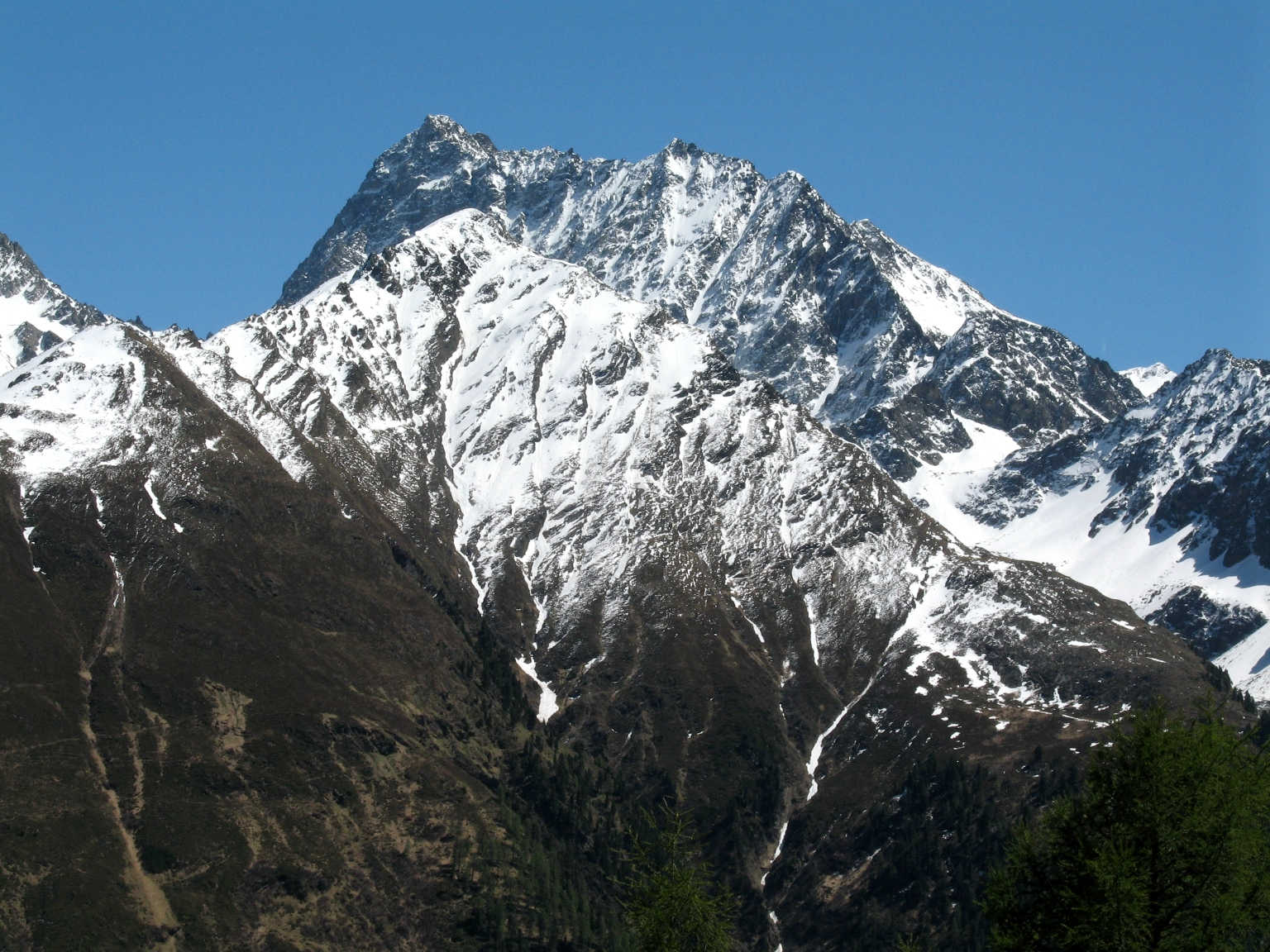
Watzespitze as seen from the west from the Glockturm ridge

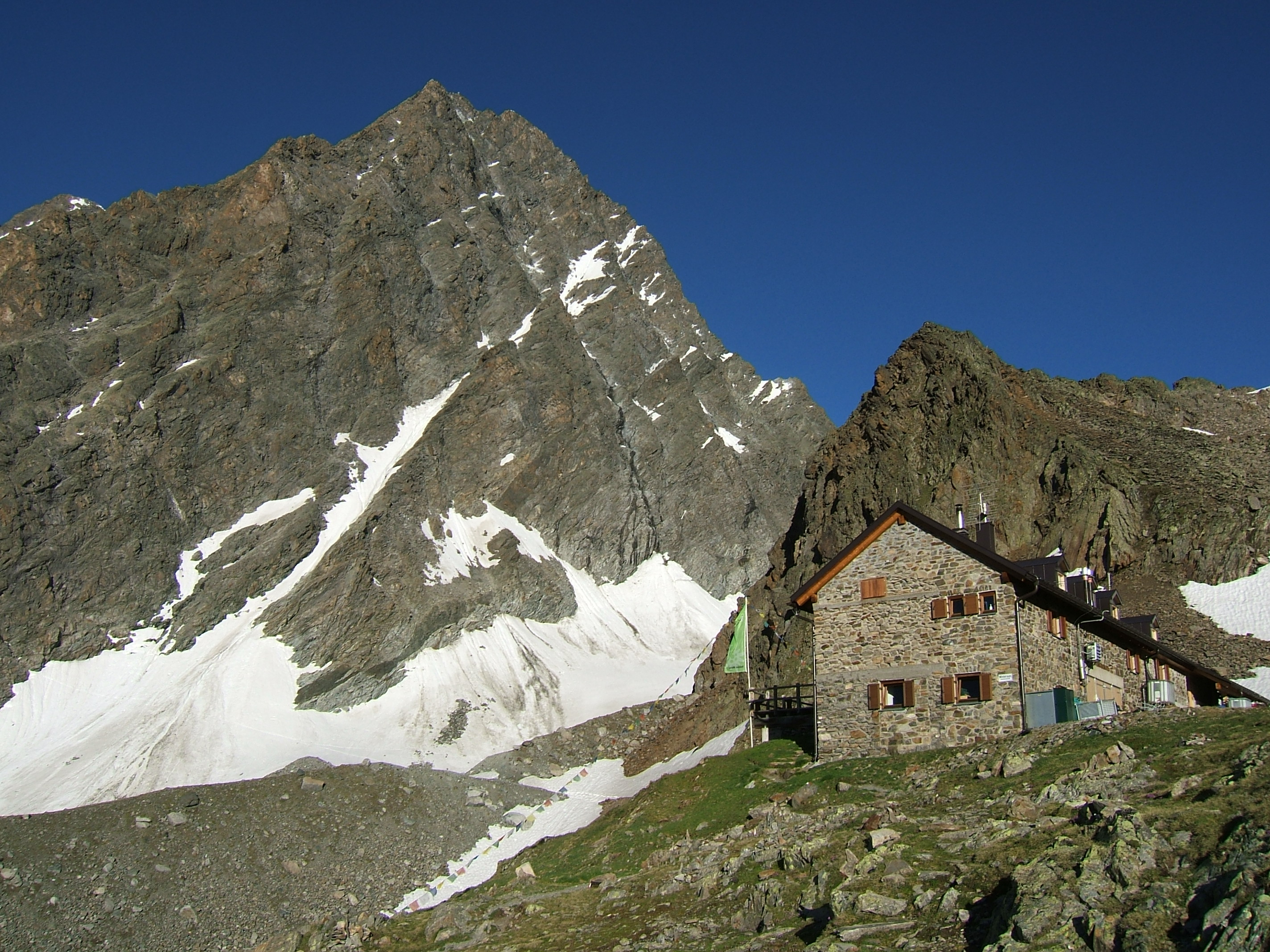
Watzespitze from the northeast, with the Kaunergrathütte
