= Innere Schwarze Schneid =

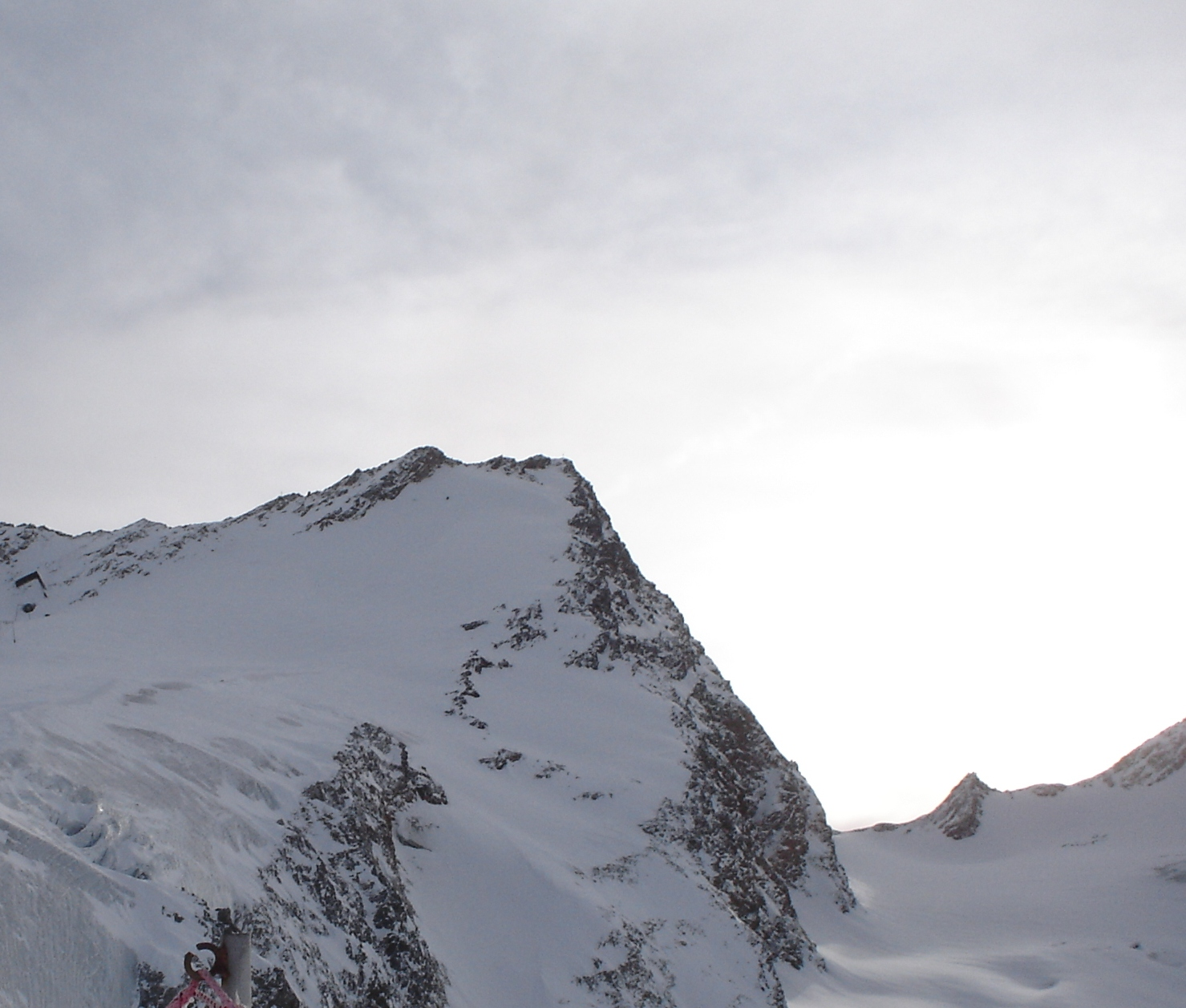
- Innere Schwarze Schneid from the North from the Rettenbachferner.

Highest point
- Elevation: 3,367 m (11,047 ft)
- Prominence: 293 m (961 ft)
- Parent peak: Wildspitze
- Listing: Alpine mountains above 3000 m
- Coordinates: 46°55′26″N 10°55′16″E

Geography
- Location within Austria
- Location: Tyrol, Austria
- Parent range: Ötztal Alps

Climbing
- First ascent: 23 July 1874 by Theodor Petersen, Moriz von Déchy and Victor Hecht, guided by Alois Ennemoser, Johann Pinggera and Josef Spechtenhauser
- Easiest route: South ridge from Braunschweiger Hütte (UIAA-I)

The Innere Schwarze Schneid is a mountain in the Weisskamm group of the Ötztal Alps.
