= Kreuzspitze (Ötztal Alps) =

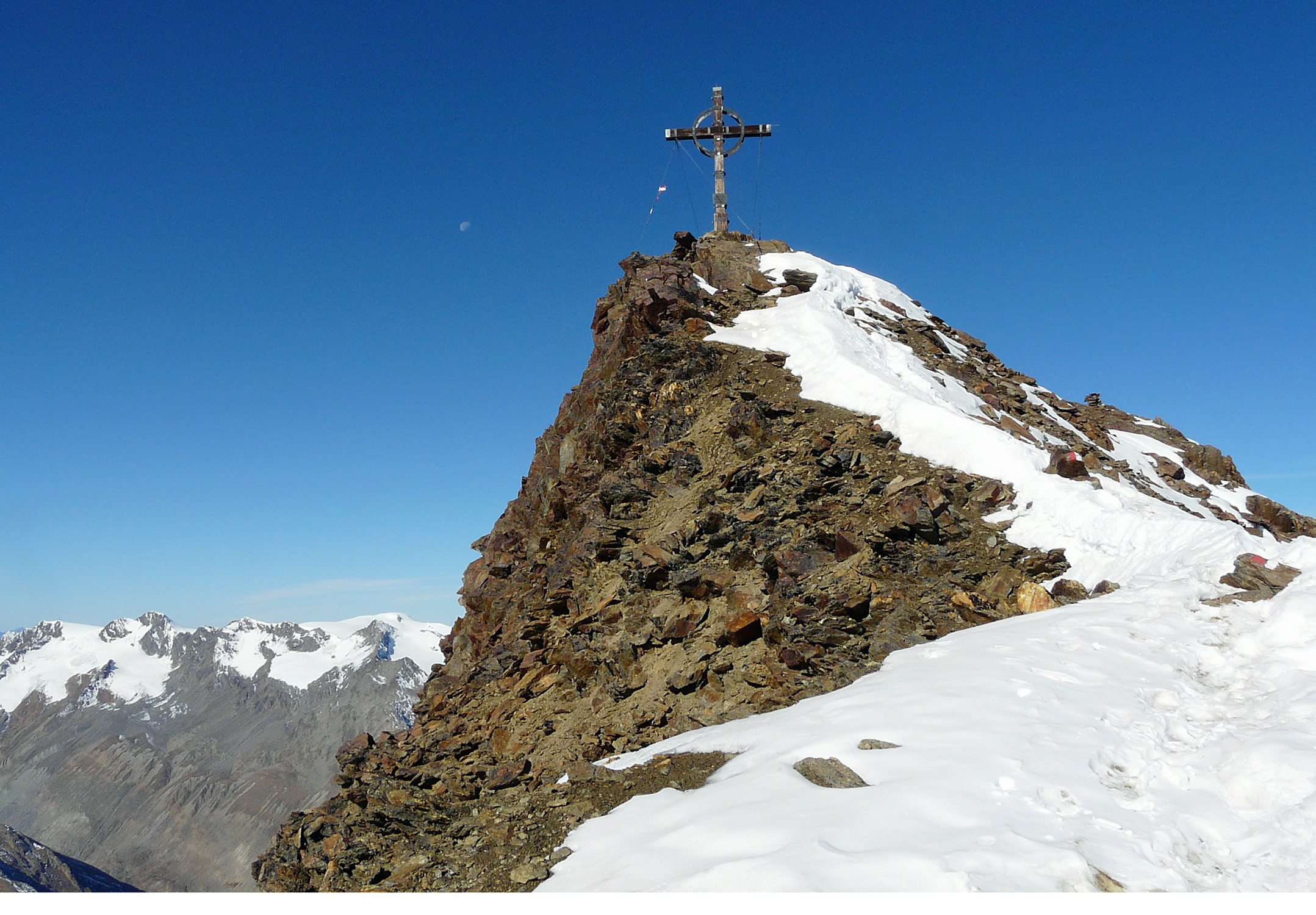
- Summit cross (Gipfelkreuz) on the Kreuzspitze

Highest point
- Elevation: 3,457 m (11,342 ft)
- Prominence: 235 m (771 ft)
- Parent peak: Fineilspitze
- Coordinates: 46°48′59″N 10°52′13″E

Geography
- Location within Austria
- Location: Tyrol, Austria
- Parent range: Ötztal Alps

Climbing
- First ascent: 1865 by Franz Senn and Cyprian Granbichler
- Easiest route: Via a marked path from the Martin Busch Hütte over the north ridge

The Kreuzspitze is a mountain in the Schnalskamm group of the Ötztal Alps. It is one of the tallest peaks in its area.

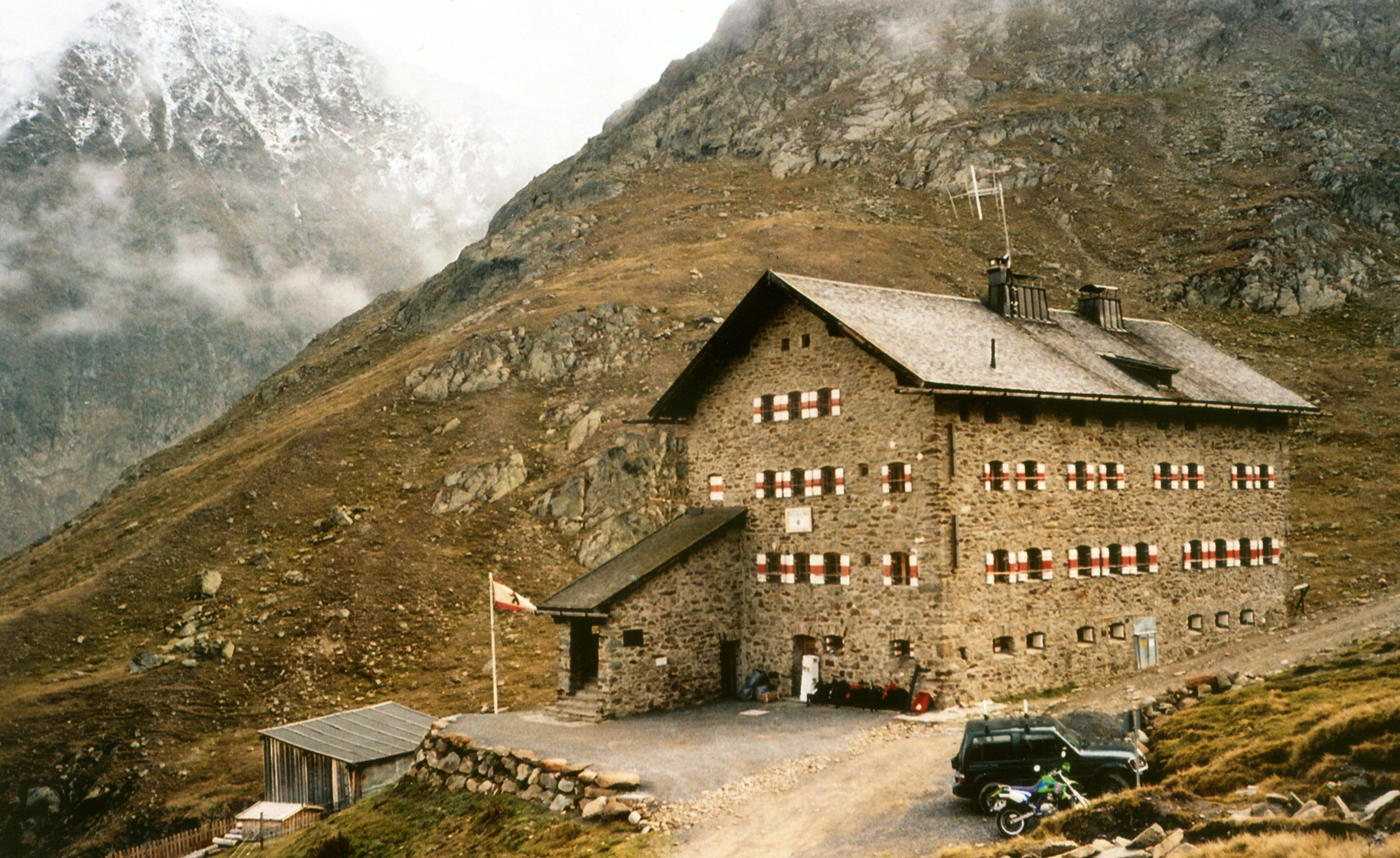
Martin Busch hut (2501m)

== Access roads and normal climbing route ==
To access the mountain you walk from Vent in the direction of Martin Busch hut which is at 2501 meters above the sea. This is a walk up, and it is normally free of snow in the summer time. Plan between 4 and 5 hours from Vent to the summit. From the village to the hut takes 2 to 3 hours.

Vent is at around 1900 meters above the sea level and it is accessible by car following a rather good road from Solden (Soelden, Sölden).
