= Bliggspitze =

Mountain in Austria

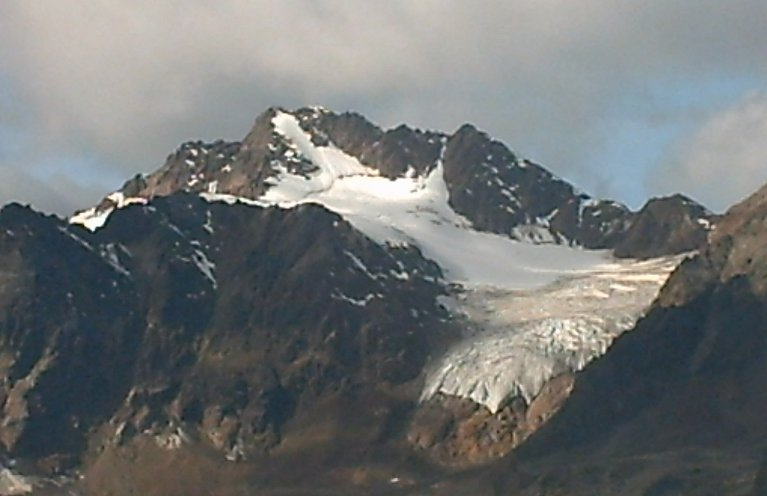
- Bliggspitze from the northeast from the end of the Pitz valley.

Highest point
- Elevation: 3,454 m (11,332 ft)
- Prominence: 381 m (1,250 ft)
- Parent peak: Watzespitze
- Listing: Alpine mountains above 3000 m
- Coordinates: 46°55′05″N 10°47′11″E

Geography
- Location within Austria
- Location: Tyrol, Austria
- Parent range: Ötztal Alps

Climbing
- First ascent: 24 Sep 1874 by Theodor Petersen und Alois Ennemoser

The Bliggspitze is a mountain in the Kaunergrat group of the Ötztal Alps in Austria. It has a summit elevation of 3,454 m above sea level.

== See also ==
- List of mountains of the Alps
