= Franz Senn =

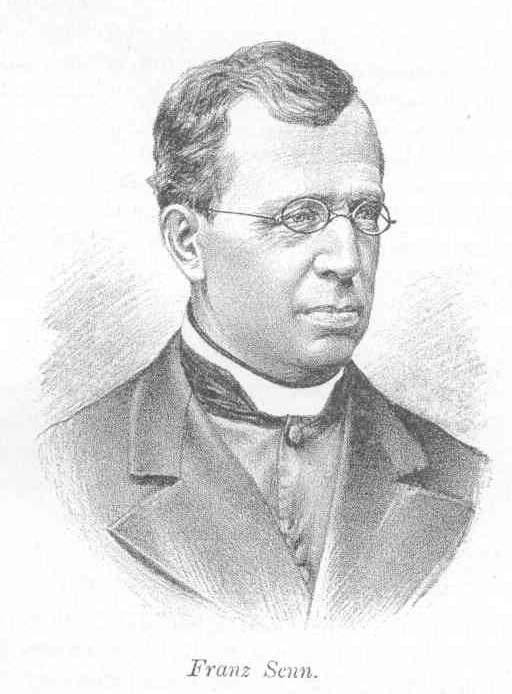
- Born: Franz Xaverius Senn; 19 March 1831; Längenfeld, Ötztal, Austrian Empire
- Died: 31 January 1884 (aged 52); Neustift im Stubaital, Austria-Hungary
- Citizenship: Austrian
- Occupations: Priest, mountaineer

Franz Xaverius Senn (19 March 1831 – 31 January 1884) was an Austrian Catholic priest and mountaineer who was among the first to promote alpinism and foster the early development of mountaineering in Tyrol. His concern for the poverty of his parishioners led him to encourage tourism into the Stubaital and Ötztal valleys. Senn was an early member of the Austrian Alpine Club and a founding member of the German Alpine Club. The Franz Senn Hut and the Sennkogel are named in his honour. Senn's passion for mountaineering led to his ascent of numerous 3,000-metre summits throughout the Ötztal Alps.
