= Aiguille de Tré la Tête =

Mountain in the south of the Mont Blanc massif

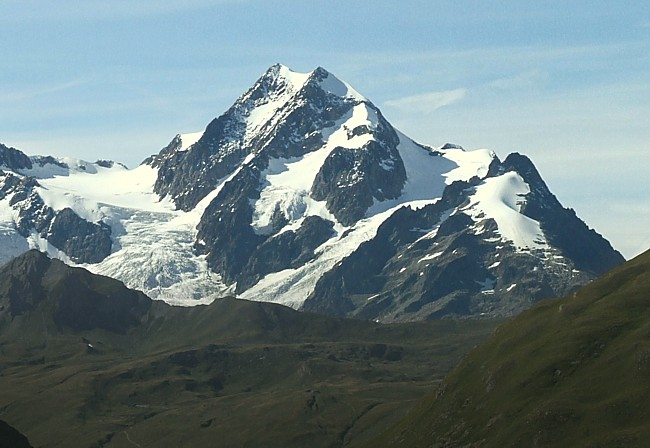
- View of the Aiguille de Tré la Tête

Highest point
- Peak: aiguille centrale SE
- Elevation: 3,930 m (12,890 ft)
- Prominence: 588 m (1,929 ft)
- Listing: Alpine mountains above 3000 m
- Coordinates: 45°47′42″N 6°48′54″E

Geography
- Location: Aosta Valley, Italy (mountain partially in France)
- Parent range: Mont Blanc massif

Climbing
- First ascent: 12 July 1864 by Anthony Adams Reilly and Edward Whymper with Michel Croz, Michel Payot and H. Charlet
- Normal route: ENE arête (PD+) then the Bivouac Rainetto

The Aiguille de Tré-la-Tête is a mountain in the south of the Mont Blanc massif. Its highest point, the central southeast pinnacle, is 3,930 metres (12,894 ft) above sea level and is located in Italy. Only the northwest pinnacle is situated on the border with France. It forms a chain with the Dômes de Miage.

It comprises four summits:

- l'aiguille Nord or Tête Blanche (3,892 m); north top
- l'aiguille centrale Nord-Ouest (3,846 m); central northwest top
- l'aiguille centrale Sud-Est (highest point, 3,930 m); central southeast top
- l'aiguille orientale (3,895 m); east top.

The western slope of the mountain is part of the Contamines-Montjoie Nature Reserve

== History ==
In September 2007, the body of a young mountaineer, who had died in 1954, was discovered on the glacier. It was found by a hiker at an elevation of 2,500 metres below a mountain trail. After investigation, it was ascertained to be a 24-year-old man who had disappeared on 4 August 1954 with his 21-year-old brother and 16-year-old sister, returning from climbing the ascent Aiguille de la Lex Blanche (3,697 m) The bodies of two younger people were found two kilometres above the foot of the glacier face.

== Bibliography ==
- François Labande (1987), "À l'ouest du col du Géant", La Chaîne du Mont-Blanc; Guide Vallot. Sélection de voies., vol. 1, Éditions Arthaud

== See also ==
- List of mountains of the Alps above 3000 m

=== External links ===
- Media related to Aiguille de Tré-la-Tête at Wikimedia Commons
- Aiguille de Tré la Tète at camptocamp.
