= List of prominent mountains of the Alps above 3000 m =

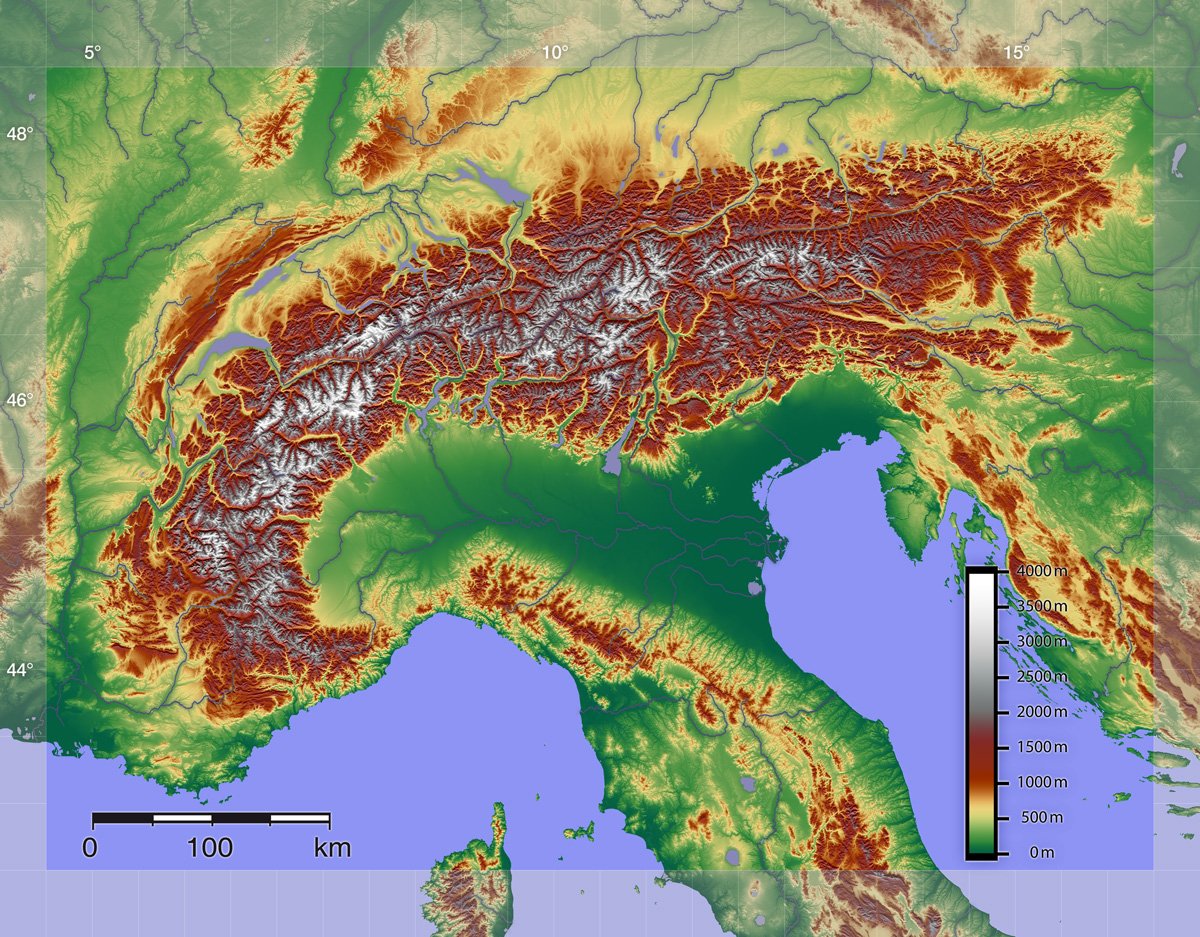
Relief of the Alps

This page tabulates only the most prominent mountains of the Alps, selected for having a topographic prominence of at least 300 metres (980 ft), all exceeding 3,000 metres (9,800 ft) in height. Although the list contains 537 summits, some significant alpine mountains are necessarily excluded for failing to meet the stringent prominence criterion.

The list of these most prominent mountains is continued down to 2500 m elevation at List of prominent mountains of the Alps (2500–2999 m) and down to 2000 m elevation on List of prominent mountains of the Alps (2000–2499 m). All such mountains are located in France, Italy, Switzerland, Liechtenstein, Austria, Germany or Slovenia, even in some lower regions. Together, these lists include all 44 ultra-prominent peaks of the Alps, with 19 ultras over 3000m on this page.

For a definitive list of all 82 of the highest peaks of the Alps, as identified by the International Climbing and Mountaineering Federation (UIAA), and often referred to as the 'Alpine four-thousanders', see List of mountains of the Alps over 4000 metres.

== Criteria ==
The International Climbing and Mountaineering Federation defines a summit in the Alps as independent, if the connecting ridge between it and a higher summit drops at least 30 m (a prominence/drop of 30 m, with the lowest point referred to as the "key col"). Over 3300 such summits are exceeding 2500 m in Switzerland alone. For a peak to qualify as an independent mountain, traditionally a prominence of at least 300 m, or 10 times the aforementioned criterion value, has been used. Inclusion based on prominence is expedient for its objectivity and verifiability. It also allows the incorporation of the low elevation (but prominent) mountains and the highest mountains, maximizing territory coverage and ensuring a reasonably even distribution throughout the range. However, it has its drawbacks. For example, an impressive mountain peak dominating a valley may be connected via long high ridges to a barely higher hidden summit. Among the better-known peaks absent from this list are Aiguille du Dru (due to Aiguille Verte), Dent du Géant (Grandes Jorasses), Mont Blanc de Cheilon (Ruinette), Nadelhorn and Täschhorn (Dom), Wetterhorn (Mittelhorn), Piz d'Err (Piz Calderas), Piz Badile (Piz Cengalo), Piz Palü (Piz Zupo), Similaun (Hintere Schwarze), Crozzon di Brenta (Cima Tosa), and Cimon della Pala (Cima Vezzana).

== Accuracy ==
All mountain heights and prominences on the list are from the largest-scale maps available. However, heights often conflict on different topographic maps, even when created by the same cartographic institution. For example, the Fletschhorn is indicated to be 3993, 3982, and 3984.5 m high on the 1:100,000, 1:50,000 and 1:25,000 Swisstopo map, respectively. This table uses the latter map's (rounded) elevation. Also, the deepest points in connecting ridges are not always survey points with spot elevations, where heights have to be estimated from contour lines. For example, maps often provide heights for where a route passes over a ridge rather than for the lowest point of that pass.

Finally, many height indications on these maps are from quite old measurements, while glacier and firn melt has decreased the height of both peaks and key cols, sometimes quite dramatically. For example, in 1930, glacier-capped Cima Tosa was the highest mountain of the Brenta Dolomites at 3,173 m, but now is around 3,140 m high and some 10 m lower than its rocky neighbor Cima Brenta (3,151 m). Most maps and guides still report Cima Tosa's old height. On the other hand, in the 1930s, when the current Italian 1:25.000 topographic map of the region was created, the Passo del Vannino, northwest of the Ofenhorn, was covered by the Lebendun glacier and was measured to be 2,754 m, while the much more recent Swisstopo map shows it to be bare and 2,717 m high. This is the key col for Corno di Ban (3,028 m), which, thanks to the retreat of the glacier, now appears on the list with a prominence of 311 m.

Given the inaccuracies, the list includes (unranked) summits with estimated prominences down to 7 meter below the cut-off (293 m), many of which may very well have a real prominence exceeding 300 m.

== Distribution ==
The lists contain 1599 mountains higher than 2000 m. (Note: The number 1599 includes the 54 unranked summits with 293–299 m prominence, but excludes the 6 summits between 1996–1999 m high) The summits are distributed over 7 countries as follows:

Country	2000+	2500+	3000+	3500+	4000+	Total
Austria (AT)	206	150	93	14	0	463
France (FR)	71	95	75	40	4	285
Germany (DE)	14	11	0	0	0	25
Italy (IT)	149	197	169	48	7	570
Liechtenstein (LI)	4	1	0	0	0	5
Slovenia (SI)	22	9	0	0	0	31
Switzerland (CH)	66	114	147	44	24	395
Alps total	507	530	416	117	29	1599

175 of the summits are on international borders. A number of mountains (e.g. Rocciamelone (IT), Aiguille de Tré la Tête (IT), Monte Rosa (CH), Piz Bernina (CH), and Hochgall (IT)) straddle borders as well, but have their summit on one side. In the list, only the exact location of the culminating point of the mountain is considered.

The 1092 mountains over 2500 m are found in 44 different administrative regions (cantons, departments, provinces, states). The administrative regions with the most mountains over 2500 m are Tyrol (161), Graubünden (148), Valais (103), South Tyrol (91), Sondrio (73), Aosta Valley (69), Savoy (67), Hautes-Alpes (66), Salzburg (57), Belluno (56) and Trentino (50).

The table below shows the distribution of mountains by height and prominence. Totals do not include the 54 unranked summits with 293–299 m prominence. Cima Brenta is treated as having a prominence of 1500m for consistency with lists of ultras.

Prominence	2000-2499	2500-2999	3000-3499	3500-3999	4000+	Total
>=1500m (Ultras)	12	13	6	6	7	44
1000-1499m	45	22	26	11	5	109
500-999m	144	141	133	35	10	453
300-499m	293	332	233	58	7	922
Alps total (>300m)	494	514	398	110	29	1545

== Alpine mountains over 3000 m high with 300 m prominence ==
Rank (Note: Summits with a prominence below 300 m are not ranked.)	Mountain	Height (m)	Drop (m) (Note: Numbers in italics are estimates because a precise height for the key col is lacking.)	Coordinates	Range (Note: For the Eastern Alps the range names are according to the Alpine Club classification of the Eastern Alps.)	Range (Note: SOIUSA codes, representing a proposal for a new classification system of the Alps. The codes usually but not always correspond to established ranges. Sorting on this tab puts the mountains in a geographic order, roughly from the southwest to the east.)	Region (Note: State in Austria and Germany, department in France, province in Italy, and canton in Switzerland.)	Country	First ascent
1	Mont Blanc / Monte Bianco	4808	4695	45°49′57″N 06°51′52″E	Mont Blanc massif	I/B-07.V-B	Haute-Savoie/Aosta Valley	FR/IT	1786
2	Monte Rosa / Mont Rose (Dufourspitze)	4634	2165	45°56′13″N 07°52′01″E	Monte Rosa Alps	I/B-09.III-A	Valais/Piedmont	CH/IT	1855
3	Dom	4546	1047	46°05′38″N 07°51′32″E	Mischabel	I/B-09.V-A	Valais	CH	1858
4	Lyskamm	4532	379	45°55′20″N 07°50′08″E	Monte Rosa Alps	I/B-09.III-A	Valais/Aosta Valley	CH/IT	1861
5	Weisshorn	4505	1234	46°06′05″N 07°42′57″E	Weisshorn-Matterhorn	I/B-09.II-D	Valais	CH	1861
6	Matterhorn / Cervino / Cervin	4478	1043	45°58′35″N 07°39′31″E	Weisshorn-Matterhorn	I/B-09.II-A	Valais/Aosta Valley	CH/IT	1865
7	Dent Blanche	4357	916	46°02′03″N 07°36′43″E	Weisshorn-Matterhorn	I/B-09.II-C	Valais	CH	1862
8	Grand Combin	4309	1512	45°56′15″N 07°17′57″E	Grand Combin Alps	I/B-09.I-B	Valais	CH	1859
9	Finsteraarhorn	4274	2279	46°32′14″N 08°07′34″E	Bernese Alps	I/B-12.II-A	Bern/Valais	CH	1829
10	Zinalrothorn	4221	491	46°03′54″N 07°41′25″E	Weisshorn-Matterhorn	I/B-09.II-D	Valais	CH	1864
11	Grandes Jorasses (Pointe Walker)	4208	852	45°52′09″N 06°59′18″E	Mont Blanc massif	I/B-07.V-B	Haute-Savoie/Aosta Valley	FR/IT	1868
12	Alphubel	4206	359	46°03′47″N 07°51′50″E	Mischabel	I/B-09.V-A	Valais	CH	1860
13	Rimpfischhorn	4199	647	46°01′24″N 07°53′03″E	Mischabel	I/B-09.V-A	Valais	CH	1859
14	Aletschhorn	4194	1043	46°27′54″N 07°59′38″E	Bernese Alps	I/B-12.II-E	Valais	CH	1859
15	Strahlhorn	4190	404	46°00′48″N 07°54′06″E	Mischabel	I/B-09.V-A	Valais	CH	1854
16	Dent d'Hérens	4173	704	45°58′12″N 07°36′19″E	Weisshorn-Matterhorn	I/B-09.II-A	Valais/Aosta Valley	CH/IT	1863
17	Breithorn	4160	438	45°56′28″N 07°44′56″E	Monte Rosa Alps	I/B-09.III-A	Valais/Aosta Valley	CH/IT	1813
18	Jungfrau	4158	694	46°32′12″N 07°57′45″E	Bernese Alps	I/B-12.II-B	Bern/Valais	CH	1811
19	Aiguille Verte	4122	689	45°56′05″N 06°58′13″E	Mont Blanc massif	I/B-07.V-B	Haute-Savoie	FR	1865
20	Mönch	4110	591	46°33′30″N 07°59′50″E	Bernese Alps	I/B-12.II-B	Bern/Valais	CH	1857
21	Barre des Écrins	4102	2045	44°55′21″N 06°21′36″E	Massif des Écrins	I/A-05.III-A	Hautes-Alpes	FR	1864
22	Schreckhorn	4078	795	46°35′24″N 08°07′05″E	Bernese Alps	I/B-12.II-C	Bern	CH	1861
23	Ober Gabelhorn	4063	536	46°02′19″N 07°40′05″E	Weisshorn-Matterhorn	I/B-09.II-D	Valais	CH	1865
24	Gran Paradiso / Grand Paradis	4061	1888	45°31′05″N 07°16′02″E	Gran Paradiso Massif	I/B-07.IV-A	Aosta Valley	IT	1860
25	Gross Fiescherhorn	4049	396	46°33′05″N 08°03′41″E	Bernese Alps	I/B-12.II-B	Bern/Valais	CH	1862
26	Piz Bernina	4048	2236	46°22′56″N 09°54′29″E	Bernina Range	II/A-15.III-A	Graubünden	CH	1850
27	Gross Grünhorn	4043	303	46°31′55″N 08°04′40″E	Bernese Alps	I/B-12.II-B	Valais	CH	1865
28	Weissmies	4013	1183	46°07′40″N 08°00′44″E	Weissmies Alps	I/B-09.V-C	Valais	CH	1855
29	Lagginhorn	4010	512	46°09′26″N 08°00′11″E	Weissmies Alps	I/B-09.V-C	Valais	CH	1856
30	Piz Zupò	3995	414	46°22′06″N 09°55′53″E	Bernina Range	II/A-15.III-A	Graub./Sondrio	CH/IT	1863
	Fletschhorn	3985	300	46°10′05″N 08°00′12″E	Weissmies Alps	I/B-09.V-C	Valais	CH	1854
31	Gletscherhorn	3982	355	46°30′46″N 07°58′04″E	Bernese Alps	I/B-12.II-D	Bern/Valais	CH	1867
32	Meije	3982	824	45°00′17″N 06°18′31″E	Massif des Écrins	I/A-05.III-B	Isère/H-Alpes	FR	1877
33	Eiger	3967	361	46°34′39″N 08°00′19″E	Bernese Alps	I/B-12.II-B	Bern	CH	1859
34	Grivola	3969	714	45°35′45″N 07°15′27″E	Gran Paradiso Alps	I/B-07.IV-A	Aosta Valley	IT	1859
35	Grand Cornier	3962	431	46°03′07″N 07°36′41″E	Weisshorn-Matterhorn	I/B-09.II-C	Valais	CH	1865
36	Ailefroide	3954	762	44°53′06″N 06°21′23″E	Massif des Écrins	I/A-05.III-C	Isère/H-Alpes	FR	1870
37	Mont Pelvoux	3943	465	44°53′51″N 06°23′48″E	Massif des Écrins	I/A-05.III-C	Hautes-Alpes	FR	1828
38	Piz Roseg	3935	417	46°22′25″N 09°52′59″E	Bernina Range	II/A-15.III-A	Graubünden	CH	1865
39	Bietschhorn	3934	807	46°23′30″N 07°51′03″E	Bernese Alps	I/B-12.II-E	Valais	CH	1859
40	Trugberg	3932	308	46°32′48″N 08°00′55″E	Bernese Alps	I/B-12.II-B	Valais	CH	1871
41	Aiguille de Tré la Tête	3923	592	45°47′41″N 06°48′54″E	Mont Blanc massif	I/B-07.V-A	Aosta Valley	IT	1864
42	Pic Sans Nom	3913	340	44°53′36″N 06°23′02″E	Massif des Écrins	I/A-05.III-C	Hautes-Alpes	FR	1877
43	Gross Wannenhorn	3906	636	46°29′38″N 08°05′49″E	Bernese Alps	I/B-12.II-B	Valais	CH	1864
44	Ortler	3905	1953	46°30′32″N 10°32′41″E	Ortler Alps	II/C-28.I-A	South Tyrol	IT	1804
45	Aiguille d'Argentière	3898	470	45°57′36″N 07°01′12″E	Mont Blanc massif	I/B-07.V-C	Valais/Haute-Savoie	CH/FR	1864
46	Ruinette	3875	860	45°58′45″N 07°24′01″E	Grand Combin Alps	I/B-09.I-D	Valais	CH	1865
47	Aiguille de Triolet	3870	301	45°55′00″N 07°01′28″E	Mont Blanc massif	I/B-07.V-B	Haute-Savoie/Aosta Valley	FR/IT	1874
48	Grande Casse	3855	1305	45°24′19″N 06°49′40″E	Vanoise Massif	I/B-07.II-B	Savoie	FR	1860
49	Königspitze / Gran Zebrù	3851	424	46°28′43″N 10°34′06″E	Ortler Alps	II/C-28.I-A	S-Tyrol/Sondrio	IT	1854
50	Aiguille du Midi	3842	310	45°52′43″N 06°53′15″E	Mont Blanc massif	I/B-07.V-B	Haute-Savoie	FR	1856
51	Monviso / Monte Viso / Vísol	3841	2062	44°40′03″N 07°05′27″E	Southern Cottian Alps	I/A-04.I-C	Cuneo	IT	1861
52	Bouquetins	3838	490	45°58′56″N 07°32′43″E	Weisshorn-Matterhorn	I/B-09.II-A	Valais/Aosta Valley	CH/IT	1871
53	Tour Noir	3837	302	45°56′56″N 07°02′15″E	Mont Blanc massif	I/B-07.V-C	Valais/Haute-Savoie	CH/FR	1876
	Brunegghorn	3831	304	46°07′33″N 07°44′44″E	Weisshorn-Matterhorn	I/B-09.II-D	Valais	CH	1865
54	Aiguille du Chardonnet	3824	503	45°58′08″N 07°00′04″E	Mont Blanc massif	I/B-07.V-C	Haute-Savoie	FR	1865
55	Nesthorn	3820	658	46°24′48″N 07°55′34″E	Bernese Alps	I/B-12.II-E	Valais	CH	1865
56	Mont Dolent	3820	330	45°55′21″N 07°02′46″E	Mont Blanc massif	I/B-07.V-C	Valais/Aosta Valley	CH/IT	1864
57	Aiguille des Glaciers	3816	301	45°46′43″N 06°48′09″E	Mont Blanc massif	I/B-07.V-A	Aosta Valley/Haute-Savoie	FR/IT	1878
58	Le Râteau	3809	452	45°00′03″N 06°16′59″E	Massif des Écrins	I/A-05.III-B	Isère/H-Alpes	FR	1873
59	Großglockner	3798	2428	47°04′27″N 12°41′40″E	Glockner Group	II/A-17.II-C	Carinthia/E-Tyrol	AT	1800
60	Schinhorn	3796	422	46°27′06″N 07°56′48″E	Bernese Alps	I/B-12.II-E	Valais	CH	1869
61	Pointe de Zinal	3789	301	46°01′37″N 07°37′50″E	Weisshorn-Matterhorn	I/B-09.II-C	Valais	CH	1870
62	Lauterbrunnen Breithorn	3780	464	46°28′43″N 07°52′36″E	Bernese Alps	I/B-12.II-D	Bern/Valais	CH	1865
63	Mont Pourri	3779	1127	45°31′41″N 06°51′37″E	Vanoise Massif	I/B-07.II-C	Savoie	FR	1861
64	Aiguille Noire de Peuterey	3774	342	45°48′55″N 06°53′35″E	Mont Blanc massif	I/B-07.V-B	Aosta Valley	IT	1877
65	Wildspitze	3770	2263	46°53′07″N 10°52′02″E	Ötztal Alps	II/A-16.I-A	North Tyrol	AT	1848
66	Monte Cevedale	3769	531	46°26′38″N 10°37′00″E	Ortler Alps	II/C-28.I-A	Sondrio/Trentino	IT	1865
67	Grande Ruine	3765	496	44°58′04″N 06°19′47″E	Massif des Écrins	I/A-05.III-A	Isère/H-Alpes	FR	1873
68	Aiguille de Leschaux	3759	309	45°53′15″N 07°00′25″E	Mont Blanc massif	I/B-07.V-B	Haute-Savoie/Aosta Valley	FR/IT	1872
69	Pointe de Charbonnel	3752	997	45°16′49″N 07°03′18″E	Graian Alps - SE	I/B-07.I-A	Savoie	FR	1862
70	Piz Morteratsch	3751	324	46°24′10″N 09°54′06″E	Bernina Range	II/A-15.III-A	Graubünden	CH	1858
71	Aiguille de la Grande Sassière	3747	792	45°30′18″N 07°00′00″E	Graian Alps - Central	I/B-07.III-A	Savoie/Aosta Valley	FR/IT	1808
72	Weißkugel	3739	569	46°47′52″N 10°43′35″E	Ötztal Alps	II/A-16.I-A	N-Tyrol/S-Tyrol	AT/IT	1845
73	Roche Faurio	3730	363	44°56′31″N 06°21′29″E	Massif des Écrins	I/A-05.III-A	Isère	FR	1873
74	Mont Vélan	3726	620	45°53′30″N 07°15′06″E	Grand Combin Alps	I/B-09.I-B	Valais/Aosta Valley	CH/IT	1779
75	Evêque	3716	647	45°57′52″N 07°30′10″E	Grand Combin Alps	I/B-09.I-C	Valais	CH	1867
76	Combin de Corbassière	3716	312	45°58′41″N 07°16′50″E	Grand Combin Alps	I/B-09.I-B	Valais	CH	1851
77	La Singla	3714	452	45°56′45″N 07°28′19″E	Grand Combin Alps	I/B-09.I-C	Valais/Aosta Valley	CH/IT	1867
78	Le Pleureur	3704	467	46°00′59″N 07°22′09″E	Grand Combin Alps	I/B-09.I-D	Valais	CH	1867
79	Wetterhörner (Mittelhorn)	3702	578	46°38′07″N 08°07′29″E	Bernese Alps	I/B-12.II-C	Bern	CH	1845
80	Balmhorn	3697	1020	46°25′30″N 07°41′37″E	Bernese Alps	I/B-12.II-D	Bern/Valais	CH	1864
81	Dent Parrachée	3697	1180	45°17′21″N 06°45′23″E	Vanoise Massif	I/B-07.II-D	Savoie	FR	1862
82	Torre del Gran San Pietro / Tour du Grand-Saint-Pierre	3691	396	45°31′33″N 07°21′32″E	Gran Paradiso Alps	I/B-07.IV-A	Aosta Valley/Turin	IT	1867
83	Monte Disgrazia	3678	1116	46°16′09″N 09°44′58″E	Bregaglia Range	II/A-15.III-B	Sondrio	IT	1862
84	Punta San Matteo	3678	369	46°22′40″N 10°34′02″E	Ortler Alps	II/C-28.I-A	Sondrio/Trentino	IT	1865
85	Uia di Ciamarella	3676	664	45°19′43″N 07°08′43″E	Graian Alps - SE	I/B-07.I-B	Turin	IT	1857
86	Dent de Perroc	3676	408	46°02′22″N 07°31′23″E	Weisshorn-Matterhorn	I/B-09.II-A	Valais	CH	1871
87	Dômes de Miage	3673	324	45°48′56″N 06°48′01″E	Mont Blanc massif	I/B-07.V-A	Savoie/Haute-Savoie	FR	1858
88	Les Bans	3669	386	44°50′55″N 06°20′12″E	Massif des Écrins	I/A-05.III-C	Isère/H-Alpes	FR	1878
89	Großvenediger	3666	1185	47°06′33″N 12°20′47″E	Venediger Group	II/A-17.II-A	E-Tyrol/Salzburg	AT	1841
90	Montagne des Agneaux	3664	460	44°57′01″N 06°25′50″E	Massif des Écrins	I/A-05.III-A	Hautes-Alpes	FR	1873
91	Blüemlisalphorn	3660	896	46°29′20″N 07°46′21″E	Bernese Alps	I/B-12.II-D	Bern	CH	1860
92	Portjengrat: Pizzo d'Andolla	3654	411	46°06′03″N 08°02′05″E	Weissmies Alps	I/B-09.V-B	Valais/V-C-O	CH/IT	1871
93	Grande Motte	3653	401	45°24′41″N 06°52′13″E	Vanoise Massif	I/B-07.II-B	Savoie	FR	1864
	Thurwieserspitze	3652	299	46°29′43″N 10°31′31″E	Ortler Alps	II/C-28.I-A	S-Tyrol/Sondrio	IT	1869
94	Aiguilles Rouges d'Arolla	3644	789	46°03′19″N 07°26′01″E	Grand Combin Alps	I/B-09.I-D	Valais	CH	1870
95	Ciarforon / Charforon	3640	341	45°29′36″N 07°14′50″E	Gran Paradiso Alps	I/B-07.IV-A	Aosta/Turin	IT	1871
96	Doldenhorn	3638	655	46°28′08″N 07°44′05″E	Bernese Alps	I/B-12.II-D	Bern	CH	1862
97	Albaron	3637	327	45°19′57″N 07°06′10″E	Graian Alps - SE	I/B-07.I-B	Savoie	FR	1866
98	Dammastock	3630	1466	46°38′36″N 08°25′16″E	Urner Alps	I/B-12.I-A	Uri/Valais	CH	1864
99	Hintere Schwärze (Note: The key col Hochjoch is 2770 m in the literature and per local indications, but appears at least 20 m higher on the maps.)	3628	835	46°46′24″N 10°54′53″E	Ötztal Alps	II/A-16.I-A	N-Tyrol/S-Tyrol	AT/IT	1867
100	Levanna Centrale	3619	525	45°24′37″N 07°10′19″E	Graian Alps - SE	I/B-07.I-C	Savoie/Turin	FR/IT	1875
101	Tödi (Piz Russein)	3614	1570	46°48′40″N 08°54′53″E	Glarus Alps	I/B-13.II-A	Glarus/Graub.	CH	1824
102	Pointe de Ronce	3612	500	45°15′52″N 06°58′43″E	Graian Alps - SE	I/B-07.I-A	Savoie	FR	1784
103	Les Diablons	3609	379	46°08′33″N 07°40′16″E	Weisshorn-Matterhorn	I/B-09.II-D	Valais	CH	1863
104	Grande Rousse / Pic de l'Invergnan	3607	525	45°33′48″N 07°05′04″E	Graian Alps - Central	I/B-07.III-A	Aosta Valley	IT	1874
105	Tsanteleina	3602	490	45°28′46″N 07°02′46″E	Graian Alps - Central	I/B-07.III-A	Savoie/Aosta Valley	FR/IT	1865
106	Aiguille du Plat de la Selle	3596	423	44°57′52″N 06°13′24″E	Massif des Écrins	I/A-05.III-B	Isère	FR	1876
107	Piz Glüschaint	3594	341	46°21′45″N 09°50′24″E	Bernina Range	II/A-15.III-A	Graub./Sondrio	CH/IT	1863
108	Bessanèse /Uia di Bessanese	3592	386	45°18′08″N 07°07′10″E	Graian Alps - SE	I/B-07.I-B	Savoie/Turin	FR/IT	1857
109	Les Rouies	3589	506	44°51′52″N 06°15′31″E	Massif des Écrins	I/A-05.III-D	Isère	FR	1873
110	Grand Roc Noir	3582	818	45°19′49″N 06°53′31″E	Vanoise Massif	I/B-07.II-A	Savoie	FR	
111	Mont Brulé	3578	365	45°57′18″N 07°32′18″E	Weisshorn-Matterhorn	I/B-09.II-A	Valais/Aosta Valley	CH/IT	1876
112	Croix Rousse/Croce Rossa (Note: East summit. West summit is 3,541m. On some maps neighboring Ouile d'Arbéron is higher.)	3571	499	45°15′38″N 07°08′05″E	Graian Alps - SE	I/B-07.I-B	Savoie/Turin	FR/IT	1857
113	Olan	3564	552	44°51′34″N 06°11′50″E	Massif des Écrins	I/A-05.III-D	Isère/H-Alpes	FR	1875
114	Großes Wiesbachhorn	3564	481	47°09′23″N 12°45′19″E	Glockner Group	II/A-17.II-C	Salzburg	AT	1795
115	Plaret	3563	362	44°58′07″N 06°15′36″E	Massif des Écrins	I/A-05.III-B	Isère	FR	1877
116	Cime de Clot Châtel	3563	320	44°53′51″N 06°16′49″E	Massif des Écrins	I/A-05.III-D	Isère	FR	1877
	Ouille d'Arbéron/Pta d'Arnas (Note: Included since apparent parent Croix Rousse is labeled lower on some maps.)	3563	294	45°16′18″N 07°07′41″E	Graian Alps - SE	I/B-07.I-B	Savoie/Turin	FR/IT	1873
117	Aiguille de Péclet	3562	766	45°16′53″N 06°37′28″E	Vanoise Massif	I/B-07.II-E	Savoie	FR	1878
118	Tête de l'Étret	3559	310	44°53′24″N 06°14′43″E	Massif des Écrins	I/A-05.III-D	Isère	FR	1876
119	Presanella	3558	1676	46°13′12″N 10°39′50″E	Adamello-Presanella	II/C-28.III-B	Trentino	IT	1864
120	Monte Emilius / Mont Émilius	3557	731	45°40′44″N 07°23′05″E	Gran Paradiso Alps	I/B-07.IV-C	Aosta Valley	IT	1826
121	Tschingelhorn	3555	389	46°28′43″N 07°50′55″E	Bernese Alps	I/B-12.II-D	Bern/Valais	CH	1865
122	Aouille Tseuque	3554	345	45°55′49″N 07°26′35″E	Grand Combin Alps	I/B-09.I-C	Valais/Aosta Valley	CH/IT	
123	Monte Leone	3553	1144	46°14′58″N 08°06′36″E	Leone-Gotthard Alps	I/B-10.I-A	Valais/V-C-O	CH/IT	1859
124	Großer Ramolkogel	3550	380	46°50′48″N 10°57′32″E	Ötztal Alps	II/A-16.I-A	North Tyrol	AT	1862
125	Vertainspitze	3545	422	46°32′14″N 10°38′08″E	Ortler Alps	II/C-28.I-A	South Tyrol	IT	1865
126	Schalfkogel	3540	351	46°48′06″N 10°57′33″E	Ötztal Alps	II/A-16.I-A	North Tyrol	AT	1830
127	Adamello	3539	664	46°09′21″N 10°29′46″E	Adamello-Presanella	II/C-28.III-A	Brescia	IT	1864
128	Rocciamelone	3538	310	45°12′14″N 07°04′37″E	Graian Alps - SE	I/B-07.I-A	Turin	IT	1358
	Hochvernagtspitze	3535	299	46°52′53″N 10°47′46″E	Ötztal Alps	II/A-16.I-A	North Tyrol	AT	1865
129	Watzespitze	3533	489	46°59′22″N 10°47′44″E	Ötztal Alps	II/A-16.I-C	North Tyrol	AT	1869
	Bec d'Épicoune	3531	298	45°54′53″N 07°25′21″E	Grand Combin Alps	I/B-09.I-C	Valais/Aosta Valley	CH/IT	1866
130	Mont Gelé	3518	619	45°54′15″N 07°21′58″E	Grand Combin Alps	I/B-09.I-C	Valais/Aosta Valley	CH/IT	1861
131	Weißseespitze	3518	345	46°50′48″N 10°43′02″E	Ötztal Alps	II/A-16.I-A	N-Tyrol/S-Tyrol	AT/IT	1870
132	Aiguille Méridionale d'Arves	3514	1433	45°07′38″N 06°20′13″E	Dauphiné Alps	I/A-05.I-A	Hautes-Alpes/Savoie	FR	1878
133	Fineilspitze	3514	504	46°46′49″N 10°49′55″E	Ötztal Alps	II/A-16.I-A	N-Tyrol/S-Tyrol	AT/IT	1865
134	Punta Tersiva / Pointe Tersive	3513	600	45°37′14″N 07°28′34″E	Gran Paradiso Alps	I/B-07.IV-C	Aosta Valley	IT	1842
135	Hochfeiler	3509	981	46°58′20″N 11°43′40″E	Zillertal Alps	II/A-17.I-B	N-Tyrol/S-Tyrol	AT/IT	1865
136	Zuckerhütl	3507	1033	46°57′52″N 11°09′14″E	Stubai Alps	II/A-16.II-A	North Tyrol	AT	1863
	Vorderes Galmihorn	3507	302	46°30′24″N 08°11′06″E	Bernese Alps	I/B-12.II-A	Valais	CH	1884
137	Aiguille de Scolette/Pierre Menue	3506	1069	45°09′36″N 06°46′07″E	Southern Graian Alps	I/A-04.III-B	Savoie/Turin	FR/IT	1875
138	Mont Morion / Mont-Rion	3505	361	45°52′53″N 07°22′04″E	Grand Combin Alps	I/B-09.I-C	Aosta Valley	IT	1898
139	Becca di Luseney / Pic de Luseney	3503	662	45°52′14″N 07°29′28″E	Weisshorn-Matterhorn	I/B-09.II-B	Aosta Valley	IT	1866
140	Sustenhorn	3503	414	46°41′56″N 08°27′19″E	Urner Alps	I/B-12.I-A	Bern/Uri	CH	1841
141	Dreiherrnspitze	3499	581	47°04′09″N 12°14′27″E	Venediger Group	II/A-17.II-A	E-Tyr/Salz/S-Tyr	AT/IT	1866
142	Schrankogel	3497	545	47°02′38″N 11°05′57″E	Stubai Alps	II/A-16.II-B	North Tyrol	AT	1840
143	Rötspitze	3496	653	47°01′37″N 12°12′19″E	Venediger Group	II/A-17.II-A	E-Tyrol/S-Tyrol	AT/IT	1854
144	Grande Traversière	3495	340	45°31′23″N 07°03′21″E	Graian Alps - Central	I/B-07.III-A	Aosta Valley	IT	1885
145	Grand Nomenon	3488	392	45°36′43″N 07°14′10″E	Gran Paradiso Alps	I/B-07.IV-A	Aosta Valley	IT	1877
146	Sonnighorn/ Pizzo Bottarello	3487	340	46°04′27″N 08°01′20″E	Weissmies Alps	I/B-09.V-B	Valais/V-C-O	CH/IT	1879
147	Tête du Rutor / Testa del Rutor	3486	850	45°37′51″N 07°00′52″E	Graian Alps - Central	I/B-07.III-B	Aosta Valley	IT	1858
148	Grande Aiguille Rousse	3482	390	45°25′59″N 07°06′35″E	Graian Alps - SE	I/B-07.I-C	Savoie	FR	1878
149	Pic de Bonvoisin	3481	397	44°49′25″N 06°20′49″E	Massif des Écrins	I/A-05.III-C	Hautes-Alpes	FR	1879
150	Großer Möseler	3480	455	46°59′33″N 11°46′55″E	Zillertal Alps	II/A-17.I-B	N-Tyrol/S-Tyrol	AT/IT	1865
151	Hochwilde	3480	353	46°45′56″N 11°01′20″E	Ötztal Alps	II/A-16.I-A	N-Tyrol/S-Tyrol	AT/IT	1852
152	Olperer	3476	1231	47°03′11″N 11°39′32″E	Zillertal Alps	II/A-17.I-A	North Tyrol	AT	1867
153	Ruderhofspitze	3474	370	47°02′22″N 11°08′36″E	Stubai Alps	II/A-16.II-B	North Tyrol	AT	1864
154	Hinterer Seelenkogel	3472	441	46°48′06″N 11°02′40″E	Ötztal Alps	II/A-16.I-B	N-Tyrol/S-Tyrol	AT/IT	1871
155	Grande Rousse S (Pic Bayle)	3465	1175	45°08′16″N 06°08′09″E	Dauphiné Alps	I/A-05.I-B	Isère	FR	1874
156	Roche de la Muzelle	3465	529	44°55′52″N 06°06′24″E	Massif des Écrins	I/A-05.III-E	Isère	FR	1875
	Pic de l'Étendard (Note: Pic de l'Étendard, also "Costa Blanc", "Grand Rousses Nord" and "Pointe des Grands Glacier" is included despite its low drop, as it is only perhaps less than 1 m lower than the 2 km removed Piz Bayle)	3464	170	45°09′16″N 06°08′38″E	Dauphiné Alps	I/A-05.I-B	Isère/Savoie	FR	1863
157	Carè Alto	3463	481	46°06′29″N 10°35′46″E	Adamello-Presanella	II/C-28.III-A	Trentino	IT	1865
158	Pic Garin / Punta Garin	3462	307	45°39′21″N 07°22′39″E	Gran Paradiso Alps	I/B-07.IV-C	Aosta Valley	IT	1856
159	Vordere Ölgrubenspitze (Note: Bliggspitze and Ölgrubenspitze are separated by 1.7 km and the ca 230 m deep Bliggscharte. It is unclear which is the higher peak. The first summit is 3453 m in most sources, while Ölgrubenspitze is 3452 m on the Austrian BEV map but 3456 m in other sources.)	3456	390	46°54′30″N 10°46′24″E	Ötztal Alps	II/A-16.I-C	North Tyrol	AT	1876
159	Bliggspitze	3453	390	46°55′05″N 10°47′10″E	Ötztal Alps	II/A-16.I-C	North Tyrol	AT	1874
	Johannisberg	3453	293	47°06′34″N 12°40′22″E	Glockner Group	II/A-17.II-C	Carinth/Salzburg	AT	1844
161	Piz Corvatsch	3451	383	46°24′30″N 09°48′58″E	Bernina Range	II/A-15.III-A	Graubünden	CH	1850
162	Rinderhorn	3449	414	46°24′49″N 07°39′15″E	Bernese Alps	I/B-12.II-D	Valais	CH	1854
163	Wasenhorn	3447	303	46°29′53″N 08°09′57″E	Bernese Alps	I/B-12.II-E	Valais	CH	1885
164	Pointe de l'Aouillé	3446	461	45°31′36″N 07°08′53″E	Graian Alps - Central	I/B-07.III-A	Aosta Valley	IT	1880
165	Hintere Eggenspitze / Cima Sternai	3443	478	46°28′40″N 10°46′14″E	Ortler Alps	II/C-28.I-A	S-Tyrol/Trentino	IT	1868
166	Roc du Mulinet/Cima Martellot	3442	342	45°22′51″N 07°09′46″E	Graian Alps - SE	I/B-07.I-B	Savoie/Turin	FR/IT	1878
167	Sirac	3441	357	44°47′23″N 06°18′25″E	Massif des Écrins	I/A-05.III-C	Hautes-Alpes	FR	1877
168	Piz Tremoggia	3441	349	46°21′07″N 09°49′19″E	Bernina Range	II/A-15.III-A	Graub./Sondrio	CH/IT	1859
169	Dosson di Genova	3441	313	46°08′55″N 10°33′13″E	Adamello-Presanella	II/C-28.III-A	Brescia/Trentino	IT	1882
170	Truc Blanc	3440	476	45°35′14″N 07°10′02″E	Graian Alps - Central	I/B-07.III-A	Aosta Valley	IT	
171	Cima de' Piazzi	3439	1202	46°25′00″N 10°17′06″E	Livigno Alps	II/A-15.IV-B	Sondrio	IT	1867
172	Lagaunspitze	3439	422	46°44′21″N 10°44′21″E	Ötztal Alps	II/A-16.I-A	South Tyrol	IT	1876
173	Zufrittspitze	3439	309	46°30′07″N 10°46′56″E	Ortler Alps	II/C-28.I-A	South Tyrol	IT	1868
174	Hochgall	3436	1148	46°54′39″N 12°08′23″E	Rieserferner Group	II/A-17.III-A	South Tyrol	IT	1854
175	Gspaltenhorn	3436	600	46°30′42″N 07°49′39″E	Bernese Alps	I/B-12.II-D	Bern	CH	1869
176	Stellihorn	3436	598	46°02′11″N 08°00′03″E	Weissmies Alps	I/B-09.V-B	Valais	CH	
177	Pointe de la Sana	3436	525	45°23′06″N 06°55′05″E	Vanoise Massif	I/B-07.II-A	Savoie	FR	1877
178	Verpeilspitze	3425	415	47°00′12″N 10°48′18″E	Ötztal Alps	II/A-16.I-C	North Tyrol	AT	1886
179	Pointe de l'Échelle	3422	537	45°16′09″N 06°41′07″E	Vanoise Massif	I/B-07.II-D	Savoie	FR	
180	Goléon	3422	330	45°06′13″N 06°19′35″E	Dauphiné Alps	I/A-05.I-A	Hautes-Alpes	FR	
181	Aiguille de l'Épéna	3421	330	45°24′53″N 06°49′02″E	Vanoise Massif	I/B-07.II-B	Savoie	FR	1900
	Pics du Says	3420	298	44°52′26″N 06°18′21″E	Massif des Écrins	I/A-05.III-D	Isère/H-Alpes	FR	1879
182	Bifertenstock / Piz Durschin	3419	383	46°48′16″N 08°57′27″E	Glarus Alps	I/B-13.II-A	Glarus/Graub.	CH	1863
183	Piz Kesch / Piz d' Es-Cha	3418	1503	46°37′17″N 09°52′22″E	Albula Alps	II/A-15.II-B	Graubünden	CH	1846
184	Sommet de Bellecôte	3417	808	45°29′33″N 06°46′57″E	Vanoise Massif	I/B-07.II-B	Savoie	FR	1866
185	Fleckistock / Rot Stock	3416	760	46°42′27″N 08°29′51″E	Urner Alps	I/B-12.I-A	Uri	CH	1864
186	Pointe du Bouchet	3416	321	45°15′15″N 06°36′15″E	Vanoise Massif	I/B-07.II-E	Savoie	FR	
187	Aiguille de Chambeyron	3412	771	44°32′52″N 06°51′24″E	Southern Cottian Alps	I/A-04.I-A	A-d-H-Provence	FR	1879
188	Piz Linard	3411	1028	46°47′56″N 10°04′18″E	Silvretta	II/A-15.VI-A	Graubünden	CH	1835
189	Schrammacher	3410	451	47°01′37″N 11°38′35″E	Zillertal Alps	II/A-17.I-A	North Tyrol	AT	1847
190	Hochfirst	3403	401	46°49′36″N 11°04′52″E	Ötztal Alps	II/A-16.I-A	N-Tyrol/S-Tyrol	AT/IT	1870
191	Rheinwaldhorn	3402	1337	46°29′37″N 09°02′25″E	Adula Alps	I/B-10.III-B	Graub./Ticino	CH	1789
192	Aiguille des Arias	3402	432	44°53′44″N 06°10′27″E	Massif des Écrins	I/A-05.III-E	Isère	FR	1876
193	Fluchthorn	3399	647	46°53′27″N 10°13′39″E	Silvretta	II/A-15.VI-A	N-Tyrol/Graub.	AT/CH	1861
194	Piz Calderas	3397	1085	46°32′11″N 09°41′45″E	Albula Alps	II/A-15.II-A	Graubünden	CH	1857
195	Großer Bärenkopf	3396	302	47°07′51″N 12°43′54″E	Glockner Group	II/A-17.II-C	Salzburg	AT	1869
196	Hohe Geige	3395	458	47°00′17″N 10°54′31″E	Ötztal Alps	II/A-16.I-C	North Tyrol	AT	1853
197	Piz Platta	3392	1108	46°29′14″N 09°33′42″E	Oberhalbstein Range	II/A-15.I-B	Graubünden	CH	1866
198	Brec de Chambeyron	3389	462	44°31′41″N 06°51′12″E	Southern Cottian Alps	I/A-04.I-A	AdHP/Cuneo	FR/IT	1878
199	Diechterhorn	3389	308	46°38′55″N 08°21′38″E	Urner Alps	I/B-12.I-A	Bern	CH	1864
200	Veneziaspitze / Cima Venezia	3386	354	46°27′14″N 10°41′21″E	Ortler Alps	II/C-28.I-A	S-Tyrol/Trentino	IT	1867
201	Pic Nord de la Font Sancte	3385	724	44°36′18″N 06°48′01″E	Southern Cottian Alps	I/A-04.I-B	AdHP/H-Alpes	FR	1879
202	Punta di Fontanella	3384	340	45°54′22″N 07°33′21″E	Weisshorn-Matterhorn	I/B-09.II-A	Aosta Valley	IT	1864
203	Punta Sulè	3384	311	45°13′53″N 07°08′15″E	Graian Alps - SE	I/B-07.I-B	Turin	IT	
204	Rognosa d'Etiache / d'Étache	3383	584	45°08′05″N 06°50′02″E	Northern Cottian Alps	I/A-04.III-B	Savoie/Turin	FR/IT	1875
205	Piz Güglia / Piz Julier	3380	489	46°29′28″N 09°45′35″E	Albula Alps	II/A-15.II-A	Graubünden	CH	1859
206	Grand Tournalin	3379	551	45°52′18″N 07°41′17″E	Monte Rosa Alps	I/B-09.III-B	Aosta Valley	IT	1863
207	Güferhorn	3379	400	46°30′45″N 09°03′47″E	Adula Alps	I/B-10.III-B	Graubünden	CH	1806
208	Cima di Castello	3379	388	46°18′11″N 09°40′37″E	Bregaglia Range	II/A-15.III-B	Graub./Sondrio	CH/IT	1866
209	Großer Löffler	3379	368	47°01′57″N 11°54′57″E	Zillertal Alps	II/A-17.I-B	N-Tyrol/S-Tyrol	AT/IT	1843
210	Mont d'Ambin / Rocca d'Ambin	3378	501	45°09′24″N 06°53′04″E	Northern Cottian Alps	I/A-04.III-B	Savoie/Turin	FR/IT	1823
211	Cima Viola	3374	1073	46°23′01″N 10°11′47″E	Livigno Alps	II/A-15.IV-B	Sondrio	IT	1875
212	Blinnenhorn / Corno Cieco	3374	945	46°25′33″N 08°18′28″E	Leone-Gotthard Alps	I/B-10.I-A	Valais/V-C-O	CH/IT	1866
213	Hoher Eichham	3371	329	47°03′14″N 12°24′24″E	Venediger Group	II/A-17.II-A	East Tyrol	AT	1854
214	Monte Confinale	3370	376	46°26′58″N 10°30′16″E	Ortler Alps	II/C-28.I-A	Sondrio	IT	1864
215	Pizzo Cengalo	3369	620	46°17′42″N 09°36′07″E	Bregaglia Range	II/A-15.III-B	Graub./Sondrio	CH/IT	1866
216	Schwarzenstein	3369	342	47°00′36″N 11°52′27″E	Zillertal Alps	II/A-17.I-B	N-Tyrol/S-Tyrol	AT/IT	1852
217	Hoher Tenn	3368	337	47°10′47″N 12°45′34″E	Glockner Group	II/A-17.II-C	Salzburg	AT	1840
218	Malhamspitze	3368	321	47°02′57″N 12°15′34″E	Venediger Group	II/A-17.II-A	East Tyrol	AT	1873
219	Egginer	3367	378	46°04′31″N 07°55′48″E	Mischabel	I/B-09.V-A	Valais	CH	
	Innere Schwarze Schneid	3367	293	46°55′27″N 10°55′17″E	Ötztal Alps	II/A-16.I-A	North Tyrol	AT	1874
220	Piz Fora	3363	432	46°20′27″N 09°47′05″E	Bernina Range	II/A-15.III-A	Graub./Sondrio	CH/IT	1875
221	Hochalmspitze	3360	946	47°00′54″N 13°19′16″E	Ankogel Group	II/A-17.II-F	Carinthia	AT	1855
222	Corno dei Tre Signori	3360	361	46°20′35″N 10°30′56″E	Ortler Alps	II/C-28.I-A	Bresc/Sond/Trent	IT	1876
	Großer Geiger	3360	293	47°05′35″N 12°18′32″E	Venediger Group	II/A-17.II-A	E-Tyrol/Salzburg	AT	1871
223	Wilde Leck	3359	309	47°00′10″N 11°03′45″E	Stubai Alps	II/A-16.II-A	North Tyrol	AT	1865
224	Schneebiger Nock / Ruthnerhorn	3358	544	46°54′19″N 12°05′03″E	Rieserferner Group	II/A-17.III-A	South Tyrol	IT	1866
225	Grande Roise	3356	321	45°40′31″N 07°25′23″E	Gran Paradiso Alps	I/B-07.IV-C	Aosta Valley	IT	1875
226	Rofelewand	3353	528	47°01′57″N 10°49′06″E	Ötztal Alps	II/A-16.I-C	North Tyrol	AT	1873
227	Glockturm	3353	415	46°53′36″N 10°39′56″E	Ötztal Alps	II/A-16.I-A	North Tyrol	AT	1853
228	Puitkogel	3345	392	46°58′53″N 10°54′05″E	Ötztal Alps	II/A-16.I-C	North Tyrol	AT	1894
229	Marmolada (Punta Penia)	3343	2134	46°26′05″N 11°51′03″E	Dolomites - NW	II/C-31.III-B	Belluno/Trentino	IT	1864
230	Bric de Rubren / Mongioia	3340	685	44°37′12″N 06°56′59″E	Southern Cottian Alps	I/A-04.I-A	AdHP/Cuneo	FR/IT	1823
231	Piz Ela	3339	515	46°36′07″N 09°42′27″E	Albula Alps	II/A-15.II-A	Graubünden	CH	1865
232	Roteck	3337	483	46°43′25″N 10°59′03″E	Ötztal Alps	II/A-16.I-B	South Tyrol	IT	1872
233	Pointe Sommeiller/Punta Sommeiller	3332	339	45°07′42″N 06°51′09″E	Northern Cottian Alps	I/A-04.III-B	Haute-Savoie/Turin	FR/IT	1871
234	Fuscherkarkopf	3331	490	47°05′56″N 12°44′44″E	Glockner Group	II/A-17.II-C	Carinth/Salzburg	AT	1845
235	Corno Baitone	3330	483	46°10′23″N 10°26′28″E	Adamello-Presanella	II/C-28.III-A	Brescia	IT	1890
236	Mont Fort	3329	408	46°04′52″N 07°19′07″E	Grand Combin Alps	I/B-09.I-D	Valais	CH	1866
237	Grande Rochère	3328	836	45°48′49″N 07°03′41″E	Grand Combin Alps	I/B-09.I-A	Aosta Valley	IT	1832
238	Oberalpstock	3328	703	46°44′34″N 08°46′10″E	Glarus Alps	I/B-13.I-A	Graubünden/Uri	CH	1793
239	Busazza	3326	304	46°13′26″N 10°36′40″E	Adamello-Presanella	II/C-28.III-B	Trentino	IT	1889
240	Tête de Lauranoure	3325	385	44°55′35″N 06°09′07″E	Massif des Écrins	I/A-05.III-E	Isère	FR	1879
241	Pizzo Scalino	3323	859	46°16′43″N 09°58′25″E	Bernina Range	II/A-15.III-A	Sondrio	IT	1830
242	Pic de Rochebrune	3320	1019	44°49′21″N 06°47′16″E	Central Cottian Alps	I/A-04.II-B	Hautes-Alpes	FR	1819
243	Corno Bianco	3320	472	45°49′22″N 07°52′45″E	Monte Rosa Alps	I/B-09.III-C	Vercelli	IT	1831
244	Groabhopt / Testa Grigia / Tête grise	3315	643	45°49′51″N 07°47′12″E	Monte Rosa Alps	I/B-09.III-B	Aosta Valley	IT	1858
245	Mont Giusalet	3312	835	45°10′50″N 06°55′48″E	Northern Cottian Alps	I/A-04.III-B	Savoie	FR	1871
246	Piz Buin	3312	544	46°50′39″N 10°07′07″E	Silvretta	II/A-15.VI-A	Vorarlb/Graub.	AT/CH	1865
247	Mont Pelve	3312	335	45°21′22″N 06°46′36″E	Vanoise Massif	I/B-07.II-D	Savoie	FR	
248	Punta Lavina / Tour Lavina	3308	475	45°33′20″N 07°26′55″E	Gran Paradiso Alps	I/B-07.IV-A	Aosta/Turin	IT	1856
249	Pointe de l'Aiglière	3307	546	44°48′37″N 06°24′53″E	Massif des Écrins	I/A-05.III-C	Hautes-Alpes	FR	
250	Laaser Spitze/Orgelspitze	3305	318	46°33′43″N 10°43′04″E	Ortler Alps	II/C-28.I-A	South Tyrol	IT	1855
251	Reichenspitze	3303	683	47°08′22″N 12°06′39″E	Zillertal Alps	II/A-17.I-D	N-Tyrol/Salzburg	AT	1856
252	Piz Paradisin	3302	875	46°25′34″N 10°07′02″E	Livigno Alps	II/A-15.IV-B	Graub./Sondrio	CH/IT	
253	Punta Ramiere / Bric Froid	3302	673	44°51′51″N 06°55′54″E	Central Cottian Alps	I/A-04.II-B	H-Alpes/Turin	FR/IT	1877
254	Becca de Tos	3301	461	45°37′49″N 07°06′24″E	Graian Alps - Central	I/B-07.III-A	Aosta Valley	IT	
255	Verstanclahorn	3298	375	46°50′06″N 10°04′21″E	Silvretta	II/A-15.VI-A	Graubünden	CH	1866
256	Cima Sud Argentera	3297	1306	44°10′41″N 07°18′21″E	Maritime Alps	I/A-02.I-B	Cuneo	IT	1879
257	Monte Sobretta	3296	835	46°23′51″N 10°26′13″E	Ortler Alps	II/C-28.I-B	Sondrio	IT	
258	Strahlkogel	3295	513	47°06′33″N 11°01′10″E	Stubai Alps	II/A-16.II-B	North Tyrol	AT	1833
259	Gross Schärhorn	3294	513	46°49′38″N 08°49′45″E	Glarus Alps	I/B-13.I-A	Uri	CH	1842
260	Muttler	3293	703	46°54′02″N 10°22′43″E	Samnaun Alps	II/A-15.VI-B	Graubünden	CH	1859
261	Punta Merciantaira / Grand Glaiza	3293	496	44°50′57″N 06°52′57″E	Central Cottian Alps	I/A-04.II-B	H-Alpes/Turin	FR/IT	1835
262	Hockenhorn	3293	350	46°25′42″N 07°44′39″E	Bernese Alps	I/B-12.II-D	Bern/Valais	CH	1840
263	Keeskogel	3291	374	47°08′11″N 12°18′43″E	Venediger Group	II/A-17.II-A	Salzburg	AT	1840
264	Schlieferspitze	3290	514	47°07′21″N 12°14′36″E	Venediger Group	II/A-17.II-A	Salzburg	AT	1871
265	M. Aiguillette / L'Asti	3287	472	44°41′29″N 07°01′36″E	Southern Cottian Alps	I/A-04.I-C	H-Alpes/Cuneo	FR/IT	
266	Petzeck	3283	799	46°56′53″N 12°48′17″E	Schober Group	II/A-17.II-D	Carinthia	AT	1844
267	Punta di Pietra Rossa	3283	662	46°19′29″N 10°26′15″E	Ortler Alps	II/C-28.I-B	Brescia	IT	
268	Roter Knopf	3281	549	46°58′43″N 12°44′22″E	Schober Group	II/A-17.II-D	Carinthia/E-Tyrol	AT	1872
269	Piz Fliana	3281	406	46°49′38″N 10°06′31″E	Silvretta	II/A-15.VI-A	Graubünden	CH	1869
270	Rognosa di Sestriere	3280	575	44°56′05″N 06°55′52″E	Central Cottian Alps	I/A-04.II-A	Turin	IT	1836
271	Pizzo Dosdè	3280	308	46°24′36″N 10°13′33″E	Livigno Alps	II/A-15.IV-B	Sondrio	IT	1879
272	Pizzo Tambo / Tambohorn	3279	1164	46°29′49″N 09°17′00″E	Adula Alps	I/B-10.III-D	Graub./Sondrio	CH/IT	1828
273	Hohe Weiße	3279	384	46°44′44″N 11°02′14″E	Ötztal Alps	II/A-16.I-B	South Tyrol	IT	1871
274	Habicht	3277	540	47°02′37″N 11°17′23″E	Stubai Alps	II/A-16.II-A	North Tyrol	AT	1836
275	Ritzlihorn	3277	322	46°37′56″N 08°15′32″E	Bernese Alps	I/B-12.II-C	Bern	CH	1816
	Gsallkopf	3277	295	47°02′16″N 10°48′18″E	Ötztal Alps	II/A-16.I-C	North Tyrol	AT	1894
276	Basòdino	3272	959	46°24′41″N 08°28′07″E	Ticino Alps	I/B-10.II-A	Ticino/V-C-O	CH/IT	1863
277	Helsenhorn	3272	586	46°18′17″N 08°11′30″E	Leone-Gotthard Alps	I/B-10.I-A	Valais	CH	1863
278	Pointe d'Archeboc / Ormelune	3272	439	45°35′01″N 06°58′49″E	Graian Alps - Central	I/B-07.III-A	Savoie/Aosta Valley	FR/IT	
279	Östliche Feuerstein	3268	428	46°58′18″N 11°14′40″E	Stubai Alps	II/A-16.II-A	N-Tyrol/S-Tyrol	AT/IT	1854
280	Clariden	3267	413	46°50′31″N 08°52′17″E	Glarus Alps	I/B-13.I-A	Glarus/Uri	CH	1863
281	Piz Üertsch	3267	396	46°35′47″N 09°50′11″E	Albula Alps	II/A-15.II-B	Graubünden	CH	1847
282	Antelao	3264	1735	46°27′09″N 12°15′38″E	Dolomites - NE	II/C-31.I-E	Belluno	IT	1863
283	Scima da Saoseo	3264	440	46°23′08″N 10°09′29″E	Livigno Alps	II/A-15.IV-B	Graub./Sondrio	CH/IT	1894
284	Piz Languard	3262	947	46°29′18″N 09°57′23″E	Livigno Alps	II/A-15.IV-A	Graubünden	CH	1846
285	Piz Forbesch	3262	601	46°31′13″N 09°33′33″E	Oberhalbstein Range	II/A-15.I-B	Graubünden	CH	1893
286	Dents du Midi: Haute Cime	3257	1796	46°09′40″N 06°55′24″E	Chablais Alps	I/B-08.II-A	Valais	CH	1784
287	Hasenöhrl	3257	375	46°32′40″N 10°51′31″E	Ortler Alps	II/C-28.I-A	South Tyrol	IT	1895
288	Gross Düssi / Piz Git	3256	429	46°47′30″N 08°49′39″E	Glarus Alps	I/B-13.I-A	Graubünden/Uri	CH	1841
289	Hocharn	3254	678	47°04′34″N 12°56′14″E	Goldberg Group	II/A-17.II-E	Carinth/Salzburg	AT	1827
290	Piz Tschütta / Stammerspitz	3254	406	46°54′13″N 10°20′35″E	Samnaun Alps	II/A-15.VI-B	Graubünden	CH	1884
291	Sasseneire	3254	386	46°08′19″N 07°31′31″E	Weisshorn-Matterhorn	I/B-09.II-C	Valais	CH	1835
292	Ankogel	3252	578	47°03′04″N 13°14′57″E	Ankogel Group	II/A-17.II-F	Carinth/Salzburg	AT	1762
293	Cavistrau / Brigelser Hörner	3252	448	46°47′04″N 08°58′26″E	Glarus Alps	I/B-13.II-A	Graubünden	CH	1865
294	Rauhkofel	3251	593	47°04′34″N 12°05′31″E	Zillertal Alps	II/A-17.I-B	N-Tyrol/S-Tyrol	AT/IT	1853
295	Großer Hornkopf	3251	455	46°58′02″N 12°46′44″E	Schober Group	II/A-17.II-D	Carinthia	AT	1890
296	Wildhorn	3250	981	46°21′21″N 07°21′44″E	Bernese Alps	I/B-12.II-F	Bern/Valais	CH	1843
297	Penne Blanche	3248	346	45°37′08″N 07°25′37″E	Gran Paradiso Alps	I/B-07.IV-C	Aosta Valley	IT	
298	Ringelspitz	3247	843	46°53′54″N 09°20′35″E	Glarus Alps	I/B-13.II-B	Graub./StGallen	CH	1865
299	Berrio Blanc	3247	731	45°45′11″N 06°53′52″E	Mont Blanc massif	I/B-07.III-B	Aosta Valley	IT	
300	Piz Ot	3246	631	46°32′36″N 09°48′37″E	Albula Alps	II/A-15.II-A	Graubünden	CH	1830
301	Wasenhorn / Punta Terrarossa	3246	476	46°15′59″N 08°05′08″E	Leone-Gotthard Alps	I/B-10.I-A	Valais/V-C-O	CH/IT	1844
302	Punta Painale	3246	413	46°15′24″N 09°58′26″E	Bernina Range	II/A-15.III-A	Sondrio	IT	1885
303	Platthorn	3246	361	46°09′59″N 07°51′40″E	Mischabel	I/B-09.V-A	Valais	CH	
304	Tofana di Mezzo	3244	1369	46°33′04″N 12°03′56″E	Dolomites - NE	II/C-31.I-D	Belluno	IT	1863
305	Hohe Fürleg	3244	410	47°08′30″N 12°21′46″E	Venediger Group	II/A-17.II-A	E-Tyrol/Salzburg	AT	1894
306	Piz Bacun	3244	306	46°20′32″N 09°40′56″E	Bregaglia Range	II/A-15.III-B	Graubünden	CH	1883
307	Wildstrubel	3244	816	46°24′01″N 07°31′43″E	Bernese Alps	I/B-12.II-F	Bern/Valais	CH	1855
308	Tête de Soulaure / Pic Félix Neff	3243	508	44°45′45″N 06°24′54″E	Massif des Écrins	I/A-05.III-C	Hautes-Alpes	FR	
309	Hochschober	3242	433	46°56′33″N 12°41′54″E	Schober Group	II/A-17.II-D	East Tyrol	AT	1852
310	Titlis	3238	978	46°46′19″N 08°26′16″E	Urner Alps	I/B-12.I-B	Bern/Obwalden	CH	1739
311	Grand Golliat	3238	378	45°51′33″N 07°06′06″E	Grand Combin Alps	I/B-09.I-A	Valais/Aosta Valley	CH/IT	1879
312	Becca du Merlo	3237	331	45°50′38″N 07°28′14″E	Weisshorn-Matterhorn	I/B-09.II-B	Aosta Valley	IT	
313	Hoher Seeblaskogel	3235	370	47°05′44″N 11°04′29″E	Stubai Alps	II/A-16.II-B	North Tyrol	AT	1881
314	Pic des Houerts	3235	364	44°35′16″N 06°46′02″E	Southern Cottian Alps	I/A-04.I-B	AdHP/H-Alpes	FR	
315	Ofenhorn / Punta d'Arbola	3235	334	46°23′12″N 08°19′07″E	Leone-Gotthard Alps	I/B-10.I-A	Valais/V-C-O	CH/IT	1864
316	Großer Muntanitz	3232	717	47°04′25″N 12°35′21″E	Granatspitze Group	II/A-17.II-B	East Tyrol	AT	1871
317	Le Péouvou	3232	488	44°37′49″N 06°53′01″E	Southern Cottian Alps	I/A-04.I-A	AdHP/H-Alpes	FR	1888
318	Corno di Dosdè	3232	302	46°24′28″N 10°10′11″E	Livigno Alps	II/A-15.IV-B	Sondrio	IT	1866
319	Hoher Riffler	3231	321	47°04′52″N 11°42′16″E	Zillertal Alps	II/A-17.I-A	North Tyrol	AT	1853
320	Augstenberg/Piz Blaisch Lunga	3230	432	46°51′52″N 10°12′14″E	Silvretta	II/A-15.VI-A	N-Tyrol/Graub.	AT/CH	1881
321	Piz Vadret	3229	660	46°41′13″N 09°57′46″E	Albula Alps	II/A-15.II-B	Graubünden	CH	1867
322	Grand Galibier	3228	635	45°03′50″N 06°26′03″E	Massif des Cerces	I/A-04.III-A	H-Alpes/Savoie	FR	1877
323	Tofana di Rozes	3225	664	46°32′13″N 12°03′04″E	Dolomites - NE	II/C-31.I-D	Belluno	IT	1864
324	Hintere Stangenspitze	3225	465	47°03′26″N 11°58′34″E	Zillertal Alps	II/A-17.I-B	North Tyrol	AT	1891
325	Monte Gavia	3223	309	46°21′15″N 10°28′21″E	Ortler Alps	II/C-28.I-B	Brescia/Sondrio	IT	1891
326	Rocca Bernauda /Roche Bernaude	3222	682	45°06′05″N 06°37′39″E	Massif des Cerces	I/A-04.III-A	H-Alpes/Turin	FR/IT	1882
327	Monte Cristallo	3221	1416	46°34′31″N 12°12′02″E	Dolomites - NE	II/C-31.I-D	Belluno	IT	1865
328	Monte Civetta	3220	1454	46°22′48″N 12°03′12″E	Dolomites - SE	II/C-31.II-A	Belluno	IT	1860
329	Tour Sallière	3220	726	46°07′37″N 06°55′29″E	Chablais Alps	I/B-08.II-A	Valais	CH	1858
330	Vorderes Plattenhorn: Ostgipfel	3220	300	46°48′36″N 10°01′59″E	Silvretta	II/A-15.VI-A	Graubünden	CH	1868
331	Vogelberg	3218	303	46°28′42″N 09°03′55″E	Adula Alps	I/B-10.III-B	Graub./Ticino	CH	1864
332	Monte del Forno	3214	446	46°20′18″N 09°43′29″E	Bregaglia Range	II/A-15.III-B	Graub./Sondrio	CH/IT	1876
333	Bec de l'Âne	3213	372	45°36′56″N 06°59′02″E	Graian Alps - Central	I/B-07.III-B	Savoie	FR	
334	Le Métailler	3213	302	46°06′14″N 07°21′37″E	Grand Combin Alps	I/B-09.I-D	Valais	CH	
335	Piz Medel	3211	952	46°37′06″N 08°54′40″E	Adula Alps	I/B-10.III-A	Graub./Ticino	CH	1865
336	Scherbadung / Pizzo Cervandone	3211	716	46°19′27″N 08°13′23″E	Leone-Gotthard Alps	I/B-10.I-A	Valais/V-C-O	CH/IT	1886
337	Diablerets	3210	968	46°18′14″N 07°11′20″E	Vaud Alps	I/B-12.III-A	Valais/Vaud	CH	1850
338	Gran Vernel	3210	314	46°26′33″N 11°49′56″E	Dolomites - NW	II/C-31.III-B	Trentino	IT	1879
339	Piz Timun /Pizzo d'Emet	3209	823	46°28′01″N 09°24′34″E	Oberhalbstein Range	II/A-15.I-A	Graub./Sondrio	CH/IT	1884
340	Piz Cambrialas	3208	364	46°47′22″N 08°51′07″E	Glarus Alps	I/B-13.I-A	Graubünden	CH	1905
341	Pic du Thabor	3207	711	45°07′07″N 06°33′44″E	Massif des Cerces	I/A-04.III-A	Savoie	FR	1878
342	Hocheiser	3206	567	47°09′23″N 12°40′24″E	Glockner Group	II/A-17.II-C	Salzburg	AT	1871
343	Glödis	3206	376	46°57′40″N 12°43′34″E	Schober Group	II/A-17.II-D	East Tyrol	AT	1871
344	Pointe Haute de Mary	3206	326	44°34′32″N 06°53′41″E	Southern Cottian Alps	I/A-04.I-A	A-d-H-Provence	FR	1879
345	Punta Sorapiss	3205	1085	46°30′25″N 12°12′42″E	Dolomites - NE	II/C-31.I-D	Belluno	IT	1864
346	Piz Sesvenna	3204	1055	46°42′21″N 10°24′10″E	Sesvenna Range	II/A-15.V-B	Graubünden	CH	
347	Kitzsteinhorn	3203	436	47°11′17″N 12°41′16″E	Glockner Group	II/A-17.II-C	Salzburg	AT	1828
348	Schwarzhorn	3201	308	46°13′00″N 07°45′24″E	Weisshorn-Matterhorn	I/B-09.II-D	Valais	CH	
349	Mastaunspitze	3200	455	46°41′37″N 10°48′09″E	Ötztal Alps	II/A-16.I-A	South Tyrol	IT	1854
350	Piz Vadret	3199	308	46°30′32″N 09°57′03″E	Livigno Alps	II/A-15.IV-A	Graubünden	CH	
351	Gross Spannort	3198	616	46°47′12″N 08°31′28″E	Urner Alps	I/B-12.I-B	Uri	CH	1867
352	Dreiländerspitze	3197	306	46°51′03″N 10°08′41″E	Silvretta	II/A-15.VI-A	N-Tyr/Vor/Graub.	AT/CH	1853
353	Pointes de Pierre Brune	3196	354	45°22′41″N 06°51′25″E	Vanoise Massif	I/B-07.II-A	Savoie	FR	
354	Mont Tondu	3196	301	45°45′50″N 06°45′20″E	Mont Blanc massif	I/B-07.V-A	Savoie	FR	
355	Bortelhorn/ Punta del Rebbio	3193.6	430	46°17′41″N 08°07′31″E	Leone-Gotthard Alps	I/B-10.I-A	Valais/V-C-O	CH/IT	1869
356	Rocca Blancia	3193	328	44°29′57″N 06°51′53″E	Southern Cottian Alps	I/A-04.I-A	AdHP/Cuneo	FR/IT	
357	Cima Vezzana	3192	1273	46°17′23″N 11°49′49″E	Dolomites - S	II/C-31.IV-A	Belluno/Trentino	IT	1872
358	Pizzo Rotondo	3192	752	46°31′03″N 08°27′58″E	Leone-Gotthard Alps	I/B-10.I-B	Ticino/Valais	CH	1869
359	Hübschhorn I	3192	325	46°14′13″N 08°03′19″E	Leone-Gotthard Alps	I/B-10.I-A	Valais	CH	
360	Scopi	3190	792	46°34′18″N 08°49′48″E	Adula Alps	I/B-10.III-A	Graub./Ticino	CH	1782
361	Löffelspitze	3190	303	47°01′03″N 12°09′52″E	Venediger Group	II/A-17.II-A	East Tyrol	AT	1877
362	Spechhorn / Pizzo d'Antigine	3189	355	46°00′44″N 08°00′04″E	Weissmies Alps	I/B-09.V-B	Valais/V-C-O	CH/IT	
363	Gleirscher Fernerkogel	3189	321	47°06′51″N 11°03′49″E	Stubai Alps	II/A-16.II-B	North Tyrol	AT	1883
364	Piz Surlej	3188	433	46°27′12″N 09°50′35″E	Bernina Range	II/A-15.III-A	Graubünden	CH	1846
365	Gross Windgällen	3187	552	46°48′26″N 08°43′56″E	Glarus Alps	I/B-13.I-A	Uri	CH	1848
	Becca Tey	3186	296	45°35′10″N 07°05′41″E	Graian Alps - Central	I/B-07.III-A	Aosta Valley	IT	
366	Mont Glacier	3185	354	45°37′53″N 07°32′23″E	Gran Paradiso Alps	I/B-07.IV-C	Aosta Valley	IT	1875
367	Langkofel / Saslonch	3181	1124	46°31′30″N 11°44′07″E	Dolomites - NW	II/C-31.III-A	South Tyrol	IT	1869
368	Piz Murtaröl	3180	679	46°34′13″N 10°17′15″E	Ortler Alps	II/A-15.V-A	Graub./Sondrio	CH/IT	1893
369	Piz Tasna	3179	371	46°51′33″N 10°15′08″E	Silvretta	II/A-15.VI-A	Graubünden	CH	1849
370	Piz Pisoc	3173	922	46°44′40″N 10°16′46″E	Sesvenna Range	II/A-15.V-B	Graubünden	CH	1865
371	Corn da Tinizong /Tinzenhorn	3173	474	46°36′42″N 09°40′16″E	Albula Alps	II/A-15.II-A	Graubünden	CH	1866
372	Pte de Paumont / Cima del Vallone	3171	378	45°08′22″N 06°43′42″E	Northern Cottian Alps	I/A-04.III-B	Savoie/Turin	FR/IT	
373	Großer Fensterlekofel	3171	373	46°53′32″N 12°02′35″E	Rieserferner Group	II/A-17.III-A	South Tyrol	IT	1877
374	Pic du Clapier du Peyron	3169	556	44°56′14″N 06°04′37″E	Massif des Écrins	I/A-05.III-E	Isère	FR	1886
375	Hoher Riffler	3168	1341	47°06′58″N 10°22′15″E	Verwall	II/A-15.VI-C	North Tyrol	AT	1864
376	Monte Pelmo	3168	1191	46°25′10″N 12°08′06″E	Dolomites - SE	II/C-31.II-A	Belluno	IT	1857
377	Piz Tavrü	3168	851	46°40′45″N 10°17′46″E	Sesvenna Range	II/A-15.V-B	Graubünden	CH	1893
378	Piz Vial	3168	465	46°37′55″N 08°58′09″E	Adula Alps	I/B-10.III-A	Graubünden	CH	1873
379	Piz Plavna Dadaint	3167	490	46°42′31″N 10°13′25″E	Sesvenna Range	II/A-15.V-B	Graubünden	CH	1891
380	Piz Albris	3166	318	46°27′51″N 09°57′48″E	Livigno Alps	II/A-15.IV-A	Ticino/Sondrio	CH/IT	
381	Piz Lagrev	3165	855	46°26′45″N 09°43′22″E	Albula Alps	II/A-15.II-A	Graubünden	CH	1875
382	Piz Quattervals	3165	471	46°37′38″N 10°05′42″E	Livigno Alps	II/A-15.IV-A	Graubünden	CH	1848
383	Tête de Sautron /Monte Sautron	3165	300	44°29′12″N 06°52′39″E	Southern Cottian Alps	I/A-04.I-A	AdHP/Cuneo	FR/IT	1877
384	Rosa dei Banchi / Rose des Bancs	3164	321	45°34′38″N 07°31′57″E	Gran Paradiso Alps	I/B-07.IV-B	Aosta Valley/Turin	IT	1831
385	Vieux Chaillol	3163	678	44°44′10″N 06°11′26″E	Massif des Écrins	I/A-05.V-A	Hautes-Alpes	FR	
386	Pizzo Stella	3163	597	46°22′54″N 09°25′17″E	Oberhalbstein Range	II/A-15.I-A	Sondrio	IT	1859
387	Signal du Petit Mont-Cenis	3162	979	45°14′39″N 06°52′23″E	Northern Cottian Alps	I/A-04.III-B	Savoie	FR	
388	Piz Mitgel	3159	445	46°36′51″N 09°38′48″E	Albula Alps	II/A-15.II-A	Graubünden	CH	1867
389	Hausstock	3158	655	46°52′28″N 09°03′56″E	Glarus Alps	I/B-13.II-A	Glarus/Graub.	CH	1832
390	Monte Vallecetta	3156	493	46°24′43″N 10°24′01″E	Ortler Alps	II/C-28.I-B	Sondrio	IT	1867
391	Tête de Vautisse	3156	434	44°42′05″N 06°29′09″E	Massif des Écrins	I/A-05.III-C	Hautes-Alpes	FR	1887
392	Pic Ouest de Combeynot	3155	815	45°00′44″N 06°24′40″E	Massif des Écrins	I/A-05.III-A	Hautes-Alpes	FR	
393	Piz Prüna	3153	317	46°29′14″N 09°59′14″E	Livigno Alps	II/A-15.IV-A	Graubünden	CH	
394	Piz Boè	3152	939	46°30′32″N 11°49′41″E	Dolomites - NW	II/C-31.III-A	Bell/S-Tyr/Tren	IT	1864
395	Piz Popena	3152	344	46°34′35″N 12°12′27″E	Dolomites - NE	II/C-31.I-D	Belluno	IT	1870
396	Cima Brenta	3151	1499	46°10′46″N 10°53′59″E	Brenta Dolomites	II/C-28.IV-A	Trentino	IT	1871
397	Piz Terri	3149	390	46°36′00″N 09°02′03″E	Adula Alps	I/B-10.III-A	Graub./Ticino	CH	1802
398	Becs de Bosson	3149	362	46°10′04″N 07°31′05″E	Weisshorn-Matterhorn	I/B-09.II-C	Valais	CH	
399	Kuchenspitze (Note: Neighboring Küchlspitze, climbed in 1877 and separated by a 140 m deep pass, is virtually the same height (3147 m).)	3148	575	47°02′55″N 10°13′48″E	Verwall	II/A-15.VI-C	North Tyrol	AT	1884
400	Zillerplattenspitze	3148	300	47°06′15″N 12°07′47″E	Zillertal Alps	II/A-17.I-D	N-Tyrol/Salzburg	AT	1877
	Pfroslkopf	3148	298	46°58′40″N 10°41′21″E	Ötztal Alps	II/A-16.I-A	North Tyrol	AT	1887
401	Croda Rossa / Hohe Gaisl	3146	1133	46°38′05″N 12°08′37″E	Dolomites - NE	II/C-31.I-B	Belluno/S-Tyrol	IT	1870
402	Flüela Schwarzhorn	3146	609	46°44′09″N 09°56′30″E	Albula Alps	II/A-15.II-B	Graubünden	CH	1835
403	Mont Raffrey / Mont Rafray	3146	363	45°38′52″N 07°30′39″E	Gran Paradiso Alps	I/B-07.IV-C	Aosta Valley	IT	
404	Piz Mundin	3146	342	46°55′31″N 10°25′51″E	Samnaun Alps	II/A-15.VI-B	Graubünden	CH	1849
405	Dreischusterspitze	3145	1393	46°40′08″N 12°19′02″E	Sexten Dolomites	II/C-31.I-A	South Tyrol	IT	1869
406	Napfspitze (Ahrntal)	3144	587	47°03′36″N 12°02′23″E	Zillertal Alps	II/A-17.I-B	N-Tyrol/S-Tyrol	AT/IT	1880
407	Piz Tea Fondada/Monte Cornaccia	3144	319	46°32′58″N 10°18′29″E	Ortler Alps	II/A-15.V-A	Graub./Sondrio	CH/IT	1883
408	Cime du Gélas / Monte Gelàs	3143	669	44°07′23″N 07°23′05″E	Maritime Alps	I/A-02.I-A	A-Marit/Cuneo	FR/IT	1864
	Jochköpfl	3143	297	46°55′39″N 11°06′28″E	Stubai Alps	II/A-16.II-A	North Tyrol	AT	
409	Monte Cassa del Ferro	3140	849	46°34′43″N 10°12′06″E	Livigno Alps	II/A-15.IV-A	Sondrio	IT	1883
410	Cima Tosa	3140	587	46°09′19″N 10°52′14″E	Brenta Dolomites	II/C-28.IV-A	Trentino	IT	1865
411	Cime Redasco	3139	377	46°22′10″N 10°18′28″E	Livigno Alps	II/A-15.IV-B	Sondrio	IT	1896
412	Gross Ruchen	3138	397	46°48′37″N 08°46′29″E	Glarus Alps	I/B-13.I-A	Uri	CH	1864
413	Durreck	3135	618	46°57′40″N 12°01′44″E	Venediger Group	II/A-17.II-A	South Tyrol	IT	1877
414	Wilde Kreuzspitze	3135	567	46°54′45″N 11°35′36″E	Zillertal Alps	II/A-17.I-C	South Tyrol	IT	1852
415	Großer Friedrichskopf	3134	370	46°57′28″N 12°49′43″E	Schober Group	II/A-17.II-D	Carinthia	AT	1872
416	Hinter Schloss	3133	506	46°48′09″N 08°31′37″E	Urner Alps	I/B-12.I-B	Uri	CH	1863
417	Pizzo Filone	3133	332	46°27′27″N 10°09′48″E	Livigno Alps	II/A-15.IV-B	Sondrio	IT	
418	Mont Chaberton	3131	1281	44°57′53″N 06°45′06″E	Massif des Cerces	I/A-04.III-A	Hautes-Alpes	FR	1822
419	Piz Duan	3131	482	46°22′31″N 09°35′00″E	Oberhalbstein Range	II/A-15.I-A	Graubünden	CH	1859
420	Pointe Léchaud	3128	525	45°44′01″N 06°48′51″E	Mont Blanc massif	I/B-07.III-B	Savoie/Aosta Valley	FR/IT	
421	Grohmannspitze	3126	445	46°30′38″N 11°44′01″E	Dolomites - NW	II/C-31.III-A	S-Tyrol/Trentino	IT	1880
422	Piz Schumbraida	3125	315	46°32′34″N 10°20′18″E	Ortler Alps	II/A-15.V-A	Graub./Sondrio	CH/IT	1883
423	Fanellhorn	3124	301	46°32′52″N 09°07′50″E	Adula Alps	I/B-10.III-B	Graubünden	CH	1859
424	Piz Nuna	3123	535	46°43′24″N 10°09′16″E	Sesvenna Range	II/A-15.V-B	Graubünden	CH	1886
425	Schareck	3123	427	47°02′29″N 13°01′03″E	Goldberg Group	II/A-17.II-E	Carinth/Salzburg	AT	1832
	Oldenhorn	3123	307	46°19′45″N 07°13′18″E	Vaud Alps	I/B-12.III-A	Bern/Val./Vaud	CH	1835
426	Groß Seehorn	3122	434	46°53′16″N 10°01′57″E	Silvretta	II/A-15.VI-A	Vorarlb/Graub.	AT/CH	1869
427	Piz Aul	3121	395	46°37′22″N 09°07′30″E	Adula Alps	I/B-10.III-A	Graubünden	CH	1801
428	Piz da l'Acqua	3118	310	46°36′40″N 10°08′20″E	Livigno Alps	II/A-15.IV-A	Graub./Sondrio	CH/IT	1888
429	Grand Pinier	3117	335	44°43′25″N 06°24′06″E	Massif des Écrins	I/A-05.III-C	Hautes-Alpes	FR	
430	Schermerspitze	3116	308	46°53′16″N 11°05′04″E	Ötztal Alps	II/A-16.I-A	North Tyrol	AT	
431	Grand Queyras	3114	308	44°42′56″N 06°57′07″E	Southern Cottian Alps	I/A-04.I-C	Hautes-Alpes	FR	
432	Luibiskogel	3110	473	47°02′59″N 10°54′15″E	Ötztal Alps	II/A-16.I-C	North Tyrol	AT	1894
433	Monte Servin	3108	333	45°15′53″N 07°11′59″E	Graian Alps - SE	I/B-07.I-C	Turin	IT	
434	Krönten	3108	330	46°46′56″N 08°34′10″E	Urner Alps	I/B-12.I-B	Uri	CH	1868
435	Gletscherhorn (Note: The lowest col between equally high Gletscherhorn and Piz Gallagiun is the 383 m deep Passo de la Prasgnola. They share the 2694 m key col Pass da la Duana.)	3107	413	46°23′15″N 09°33′38″E	Oberhalbstein Range	II/A-15.I-A	Graubünden	CH	1849
435	Pizz Gallagiun/Galleggione	3107	413	46°22′01″N 09°29′16″E	Oberhalbstein Range	II/A-15.I-A	Graub./Sondrio	CH/IT	1861
437	Ochsner	3107	300	47°02′38″N 11°48′56″E	Zillertal Alps	II/A-17.I-B	North Tyrol	AT	1880
438	Tête de Moïse	3104	562	44°26′26″N 06°56′06″E	Southern Cottian Alps	I/A-04.I-A	AdHP/Cuneo	FR/IT	1883
439	Piz la Stretta / Monte Breva	3104	314	46°28′36″N 10°02′41″E	Livigno Alps	II/A-15.IV-A	Graub./Sondrio	CH	
440	Große Ohrenspitze	3101	369	46°54′25″N 12°10′39″E	Rieserferner Group	II/A-17.III-A	E-Tyrol/S-Tyrol	AT/IT	1878
441	Piz Segnas	3099	607	46°54′28″N 09°14′23″E	Glarus Alps	I/B-13.II-B	Glarus/Graub.	CH	1861
442	Mont Ouille	3090	363	45°43′54″N 06°51′59″E	Mont Blanc massif	I/B-07.III-B	Aosta Valley	IT	
443	Lasörling	3098	490	46°58′33″N 12°21′19″E	Venediger Group	II/A-17.II-A	East Tyrol	AT	1854
444	Pointe des Cerces	3098	485	45°03′56″N 06°29′18″E	Massif des Cerces	I/A-04.III-A	H-Alpes/Savoie	FR	1891
445	Pic des Souffles	3098	419	44°51′54″N 06°08′00″E	Massif des Écrins	I/A-05.III-D	Isère/H-Alpes	FR	1890
446	Monte Matto	3097	577	44°13′30″N 07°15′23″E	Maritime Alps	I/A-02.I-B	Cuneo	IT	1879
447	Pflerscher Tribulaun	3097	498	46°59′07″N 11°20′21″E	Stubai Alps	II/A-16.II-A	N-Tyrol/S-Tyrol	AT/IT	1874
	Blockkogel	3097	295	47°05′07″N 10°52′50″E	Ötztal Alps	II/A-16.I-C	North Tyrol	AT	
448	Piz Giuv / Schattig Wichel	3096	749	46°42′07″N 08°41′33″E	Glarus Alps	I/B-13.I-A	Graubünden/Uri	CH	1804
449	Mont Buet	3096	612	46°01′29″N 06°51′10″E	Chablais Alps	I/B-08.II-A	Haute-Savoie	FR	1770
450	Zwölferkofel / Croda dei Toni	3094	713	46°37′09″N 12°21′35″E	Sexten Dolomites	II/C-31.I-A	Belluno/S-Tyrol	IT	1874
451	Elferkofel / Cima Undici	3092	661	46°38′11″N 12°22′42″E	Sexten Dolomites	II/C-31.I-A	Belluno/S-Tyrol	IT	1878
452	Racherin	3092	429	47°04′52″N 12°47′40″E	Glockner Group	II/A-17.II-C	Carinthia	AT	1848
452a	Crête de Chambave	3090	304	45°48′20″N 07°02′19″E	Grand Combin Alps	I/B-09.I-A	Aosta Valley	IT	
453	Tête de la Courbe	3089	565	44°29′52″N 06°49′24″E	Southern Cottian Alps	I/A-04.I-A	A-d-H-Provence	FR	
454	Vesulspitze	3089	550	47°00′06″N 10°20′57″E	Samnaun Alps	II/A-15.VI-B	North Tyrol	AT	1866
455	Monte Forcellina	3087	473	46°27′59″N 10°11′55″E	Livigno Alps	II/A-15.IV-B	Sondrio	IT	
	Hohe Villerspitze	3087	293	47°06′24″N 11°09′56″E	Stubai Alps	II/A-16.II-B	North Tyrol	AT	1878
456	Flüela Wisshorn	3085	632	46°45′44″N 09°58′00″E	Silvretta	II/A-15.VI-A	Graubünden	CH	1880
457	Cima da Lägh /Cima di Lago	3083	422	46°22′35″N 09°27′40″E	Oberhalbstein Range	II/A-15.I-A	Graub./Sondrio	CH/IT	
458	Zwieselbacher Rosskogel	3081	330	47°09′48″N 11°02′53″E	Stubai Alps	II/A-16.II-B	North Tyrol	AT	1881
	Fundusfeiler	3079	295	47°06′44″N 10°52′13″E	Ötztal Alps	II/A-16.I-C	North Tyrol	AT	
459	Chüealphorn	3078	472	46°41′07″N 09°54′19″E	Albula Alps	II/A-15.II-B	Graubünden	CH	1877
460	Mont Néry / Neryschthuare	3076	905	45°42′57″N 07°49′12″E	Monte Rosa Alps	I/B-09.III-B	Aosta Valley	IT	1873
461	Großer Hafner	3076	824	47°04′12″N 13°24′03″E	Ankogel Group	II/A-17.II-F	Carinth/Salzburg	AT	1825
462	Pic de Parières	3076	469	44°46′46″N 06°14′27″E	Massif des Écrins	I/A-05.III-C	Hautes-Alpes	FR	
463	Piz Starlex	3075	779	46°39′46″N 10°23′33″E	Sesvenna Range	II/A-15.V-B	Graub./S-Tyrol	CH/IT	
464	Piz Sena	3075	344	46°21′11″N 10°06′36″E	Livigno Alps	II/A-15.IV-B	Graub./Sondrio	CH/IT	1901
465	Bristen	3073	567	46°44′13″N 08°40′52″E	Glarus Alps	I/B-13.I-A	Uri	CH	1823
466	Wildkarspitze	3073	384	47°10′21″N 12°08′21″E	Zillertal Alps	II/A-17.I-D	Salzburg	AT	1892
467	Pizzo Campo Tencia	3072	754	46°25′47″N 08°43′34″E	Ticino Alps	I/B-10.II-D	Ticino	CH	1867
468	Chüebodenhorn	3070	316	46°30′29″N 08°27′11″E	Leone-Gotthard Alps	I/B-10.I-B	Ticino/Valais	CH	
	Tête de la Cassille	3069	299	45°02′38″N 06°29′58″E	Massif des Cerces	I/A-04.III-A	Hautes-Alpes	FR	
469	La Meyna	3067	375	44°28′52″N 06°51′31″E	Southern Cottian Alps	I/A-04.I-A	A-d-H-Provence	FR	
470	Cunturines/Conturines	3064	913	46°34′33″N 11°58′40″E	Dolomites - NE	II/C-31.I-C	South Tyrol	IT	1881
472	Hoher Prijakt	3064	471	46°54′56″N 12°42′46″E	Schober Group	II/A-17.II-D	East Tyrol	AT	1890
472	Pointe Rochers Charniers	3063	389	44°59′16″N 06°44′08″E	Massif des Cerces	I/A-04.III-A	Hautes-Alpes	FR	
473	Hoch Ducan	3063	324	46°41′22″N 09°51′05″E	Albula Alps	II/A-15.II-B	Graubünden	CH	1845
474	Geltenhorn	3062	305	46°20′47″N 07°20′04″E	Bernese Alps	I/B-12.II-F	Bern/Valais	CH	
475	Mont-Fallère	3061	554	45°46′32″N 07°11′39″E	Grand Combin Alps	I/B-09.I-B	Aosta Valley	IT	
476	Pizzo Gallina	3061	378	46°29′41″N 08°23′31″E	Leone-Gotthard Alps	I/B-10.I-B	Ticino/Valais	CH	
477	Seeköpfe	3061	330	47°02′40″N 10°16′03″E	Verwall	II/A-15.VI-C	North Tyrol	AT	1886
478	Piz Grisch	3060	544	46°31′52″N 09°28′22″E	Oberhalbstein Range	II/A-15.I-B	Graubünden	CH	1861
479	Rosenspitze	3060	429	46°59′18″N 12°15′16″E	Venediger Group	II/A-17.II-A	East Tyrol	AT	1894
	Grand Queyron	3060	295	44°50′34″N 07°00′06″E	Central Cottian Alps	I/A-04.II-A	H-Alpes/Turin	FR/IT	
480	Grabspitze	3059	415	46°56′19″N 11°36′52″E	Zillertal Alps	II/A-17.I-C	South Tyrol	IT	1852
481	Monte Vago	3059	388	46°26′27″N 10°04′44″E	Livigno Alps	II/A-15.IV-B	Sondrio	IT	
482	Sasso Vernale	3058	356	46°25′08″N 11°50′26″E	Dolomites - NW	II/C-31.III-B	Belluno/Trentino	IT	
483	Bruschghorn	3056	577	46°37′52″N 09°18′24″E	Adula Alps	I/B-10.III-C	Graubünden	CH	
484	Patteriol	3056	465	47°02′39″N 10°11′15″E	Verwall	II/A-15.VI-C	North Tyrol	AT	1860
485	Aiguille des Corneillets	3055	325	45°19′21″N 06°39′41″E	Vanoise Massif	I/B-07.II-E	Savoie	FR	
	Innere Wetterspitze	3053	293	46°59′47″N 11°14′47″E	Stubai Alps	II/A-16.II-A	North Tyrol	AT	1874
486	Piz Forun	3052	458	46°39′19″N 09°51′54″E	Albula Alps	II/A-15.II-B	Graubünden	CH	1847
487	Grand Muveran	3051	1013	46°14′14″N 07°07′34″E	Vaud Alps	I/B-12.III-A	Valais/Vaud	CH	
488	Mont Pelat	3051	770	44°15′54″N 06°42′21″E	Maritime Alps	I/A-02.I-E	A-d-H-Provence	FR	
489	Pizzo Coca	3050	1878	46°04′18″N 10°00′41″E	Bergamo Alps	II/C-29.I-A	Bergamo/Sondrio	IT	1877
490	Piz Minor	3049	584	46°27′04″N 10°01′42″E	Livigno Alps	II/A-15.IV-A	Graubünden	CH	
491	Le Rochail (Pointe de Malhaubert)	3049	558	44°58′31″N 06°01′57″E	Massif des Écrins	I/A-05.III-E	Isère	FR	
492	Gross Lohner	3048	560	46°27′43″N 07°36′00″E	Bernese Alps	I/B-12.II-F	Bern	CH	1875
493	Aiguille du Fruit	3048	519	45°21′20″N 06°37′53″E	Vanoise Massif	I/B-07.II-E	Savoie	FR	
494	Punta Nera	3047	506	45°07′20″N 06°39′31″E	Northern Cottian Alps	I/A-04.III-B	Savoie/Turin	FR/IT	
495	Grand Bérard	3046	938	44°26′58″N 06°39′35″E	Southern Cottian Alps	I/A-04.I-B	A-d-H-Provence	FR	1820
496	Piz Murtera	3044	449	46°46′31″N 10°02′25″E	Silvretta	II/A-15.VI-A	Graubünden	CH	
497	Gross Wendenstock	3042	346	46°45′42″N 08°22′49″E	Urner Alps	I/B-12.I-B	Bern	CH	1873
498	Monte Albergian	3041	428	45°00′27″N 06°59′34″E	Central Cottian Alps	I/A-04.II-A	Turin	IT	1822
499	Piz Gannaretsch	3040	934	46°36′43″N 08°47′12″E	Leone-Gotthard Alps	I/B-10.I-B	Graubünden	CH	
500	Alperschällihorn	3039	425	46°35′12″N 09°18′24″E	Adula Alps	I/B-10.III-C	Graub./Ticino	CH	1893
501	Punta Scais (Note: Punta di Scais is a twin peak with Pizzo Redorta, 700 m to the south and separated by the 133 m deep "Passo Scais". They are sometimes given the same height (3038 m). Elsewhere Punta di Scais is 1 or 2 meters higher.)	3039	393	46°04′07″N 09°59′04″E	Bergamo Alps	II/C-29.I-A	Bergamo/Sondrio	IT	1881
502	Bric Ghinivert	3037	347	44°57′05″N 06°59′28″E	Central Cottian Alps	I/A-04.II-A	Turin	IT	
503	Parseierspitze	3036	1243	47°10′28″N 10°28′42″E	Lechtal Alps	II/B-21.I-A	North Tyrol	AT	1869
504	Hexenkopf	3035	371	47°01′16″N 10°28′10″E	Samnaun Alps	II/A-15.VI-B	North Tyrol	AT	1853
	Piz Umbrail	3033	294	46°33′03″N 10°24′52″E	Ortler Alps	II/A-15.V-A	Graub./Sondrio	CH/IT	1865
505	Tête de Siguret	3032	706	44°26′30″N 06°47′18″E	Maritime Alps	I/A-02.I-C	A-d-H-Provence	FR	
506	Pizzo Ligoncio	3032	506	46°14′20″N 09°32′52″E	Bregaglia Range	II/A-15.III-B	Sondrio	IT	
507	Becca di Vlou	3032	483	45°41′30″N 07°47′32″E	Monte Rosa Alps	I/B-09.III-B	Aosta Valley	IT	
508	Piz S-chalembert	3031	722	46°48′03″N 10°24′48″E	Sesvenna Range	II/A-15.V-B	Graubünden	CH	
509	Mont Ténibre / M. Tenibres	3031	525	44°17′02″N 06°58′20″E	Maritime Alps	I/A-02.I-C	A-Marit/Cuneo	FR/IT	1836
	Piz Cotschen	3031	296	46°48′47″N 10°10′37″E	Silvretta	II/A-15.VI-A	Graubünden	CH	
510	Piz Por	3028	733	46°30′34″N 09°23′03″E	Oberhalbstein Range	II/A-15.I-A	Graubünden	CH	1894
511	Bündner Vorab	3028	408	46°52′26″N 09°09′24″E	Glarus Alps	I/B-13.II-B	Glarus/Graub.	CH	1842
512	Corno di Ban	3028	311	46°25′04″N 08°21′40″E	Leone-Gotthard Alps	I/B-10.I-A	V-C-O	IT	
513	Zehner/Sas dales Diesc	3026	493	46°37′20″N 11°57′38″E	Dolomites - NE	II/C-31.I-C	South Tyrol	IT	1887
514	Bric Rosso / Monte Politri	3026	313	44°59′28″N 07°01′07″E	Central Cottian Alps	I/A-04.II-A	Turin	IT	
515	Furchetta / Furcheta (Note: Equally high Sas Rigais and Furcheta are only 600 m apart but joined by the 329 m deep Salieresscharte.)	3025	904	46°36′44″N 11°46′24″E	Dolomites - NW	II/C-31.III-A	South Tyrol	IT	1878
515	Sas Rigais	3025	904	46°36′33″N 11°46′00″E	Dolomites - NW	II/C-31.III-A	South Tyrol	IT	1878
517	Piz Corbet	3025	672	46°22′47″N 09°16′49″E	Adula Alps	I/B-10.III-D	Graub./Sondrio	CH/IT	1892
518	Corno Bussola / Mont de Boussolaz	3023	356	45°47′44″N 07°44′10″E	Monte Rosa Alps	I/B-09.III-B	Aosta Valley	IT	
519	Wendenhorn	3023	311	46°45′14″N 08°26′37″E	Urner Alps	I/B-12.I-B	Bern/Uri	CH	1884
520	Wurmaulspitze	3022	414	46°54′50″N 11°38′16″E	Zillertal Alps	II/A-17.I-C	South Tyrol	IT	
521	Pointe de la Vallaisonnay	3020	400	45°27′29″N 06°49′04″E	Vanoise Massif	I/B-07.II-B	Savoie	FR	
522	Pic du Mas de la Grave	3020	364	45°07′15″N 06°14′46″E	Dauphiné Alps	I/A-05.I-A	H-Alpes/Savoie	FR	
523	Mount Cimet	3020	342	44°17′24″N 06°42′18″E	Maritime Alps	I/A-02.I-E	A-d-H-Provence	FR	
524	Viso Mozzo	3019	361	44°40′29″N 07°06′36″E	Southern Cottian Alps	I/A-04.I-C	Cuneo	IT	
525	Piz Blas	3019	312	46°34′38″N 08°43′41″E	Leone-Gotthard Alps	I/B-10.I-B	Graub./Ticino	CH	1871
526	Gamspleisspitze	3015	328	46°55′54″N 10°14′31″E	Silvretta	II/A-15.VI-A	N-Tyrol/Graub.	AT/CH	1853
527	Hochreichkopf	3010	367	47°10′13″N 10°58′11″E	Stubai Alps	II/A-16.II-B	North Tyrol	AT	1890
528	Cima dell'Uomo	3010	327	46°24′22″N 11°48′30″E	Dolomites - NW	II/C-31.III-B	Trentino	IT	
529	Monte Giove	3009	516	46°21′41″N 08°23′17″E	Leone-Gotthard Alps	I/B-10.I-A	V-C-O	IT	
530	Acherkogel (Note: Acherkogel has a drop of only 279 m before rising to the 3010 m Hochreichkopf 2.5 km to its south, but in some sources both mountains are 3008 m high.)	3008	365	47°11′21″N 10°57′24″E	Stubai Alps	II/A-16.II-B	North Tyrol	AT	1881
531	Mont Avic	3007	394	45°40′37″N 07°33′17″E	Gran Paradiso Alps	I/B-07.IV-C	Aosta Valley	IT	1875
532	Älplihorn	3006	426	46°42′39″N 09°49′33″E	Albula Alps	II/A-15.II-B	Graubünden	CH	
533	Ritterkopf	3006	349	47°06′09″N 12°56′58″E	Goldberg Group	II/A-17.II-E	Salzburg	AT	1885
534	Furgler	3004	319	47°02′25″N 10°30′44″E	Samnaun Alps	II/A-15.VI-B	North Tyrol	AT	
535	Kesselkogel / Catinaccio d'Antermoia	3002	814	46°28′28″N 11°38′37″E	Dolomites - NW	II/C-31.III-B	S-Tyrol/Trentino	IT	1872
536	Pizzas d'Anarosa / Grauhörner	3002	366	46°35′56″N 09°18′57″E	Adula Alps	I/B-10.III-C	Graub./Ticino	CH	1894
537	Gigalitz	3001	300	47°03′28″N 11°53′28″E	Zillertal Alps	II/A-17.I-B	North Tyrol	AT	1884

The table is continued here.

== Sources ==
- Jonathan de Ferranti & Eberhard Jurgalski's map-checked ALPS TO R589m and rough, computer-generated EUROPE TO R150m lists
- Christian Thöni's list of 8875 summits in Switzerland
- Clem Clements' Austria above 2500 m lists
- Mark Trengrove and Clem Clements' list of German alps above 2000 m,
- Mark Trengrove's lists of several regions of the French Alps, and of the Grand paradiso and Rutor ranges of the Italian Alps

== See also ==
- List of mountains of the Alps (2500–2999 m)
- List of mountains of the Alps (2000–2499 m)
- List of Alpine peaks by prominence
- List of the highest mountains in Austria
- List of the highest mountains in Germany
- List of mountains of the Alps over 4000 metres
- List of mountains in Italy
- List of mountains in Slovenia
- List of mountains of Switzerland
