= Mont Tondu =

Mountain in Savoie, France

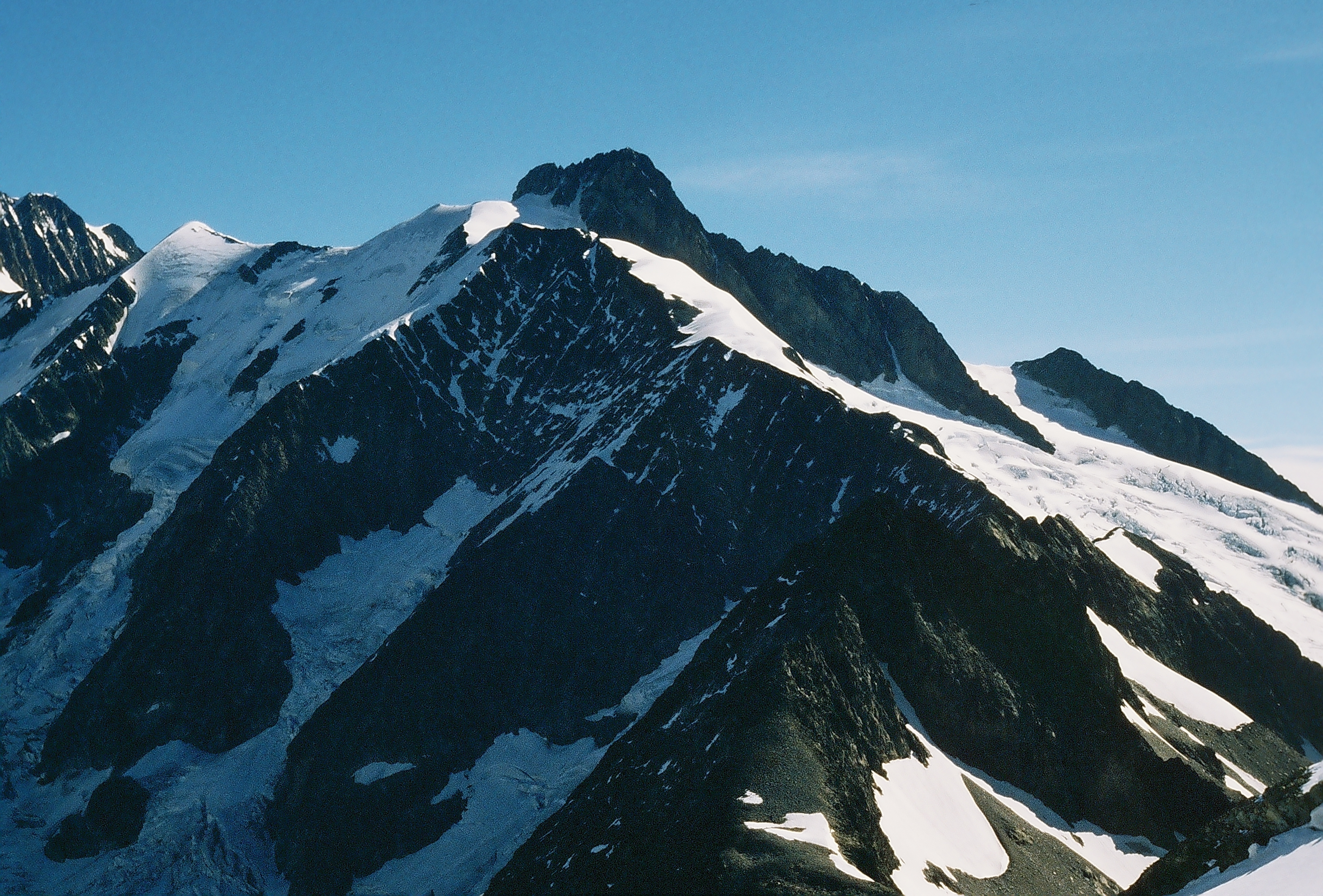
- Mont Tondu

Highest point
- Elevation: 3,196 m (10,486 ft)
- Prominence: 306 m (1,004 ft)
- Listing: Alpine mountains above 3000 m
- Coordinates: 45°45′49″N 06°45′19″E

Geography
- Location within Alps Location within France
- Location: Savoie, France
- Parent range: Mont Blanc massif

Mont Tondu is a mountain of Savoie, France. It lies in the Mont Blanc massif and has an elevation of 3,196 metres (10,486 ft) above sea level.
