= Pfroslkopf =

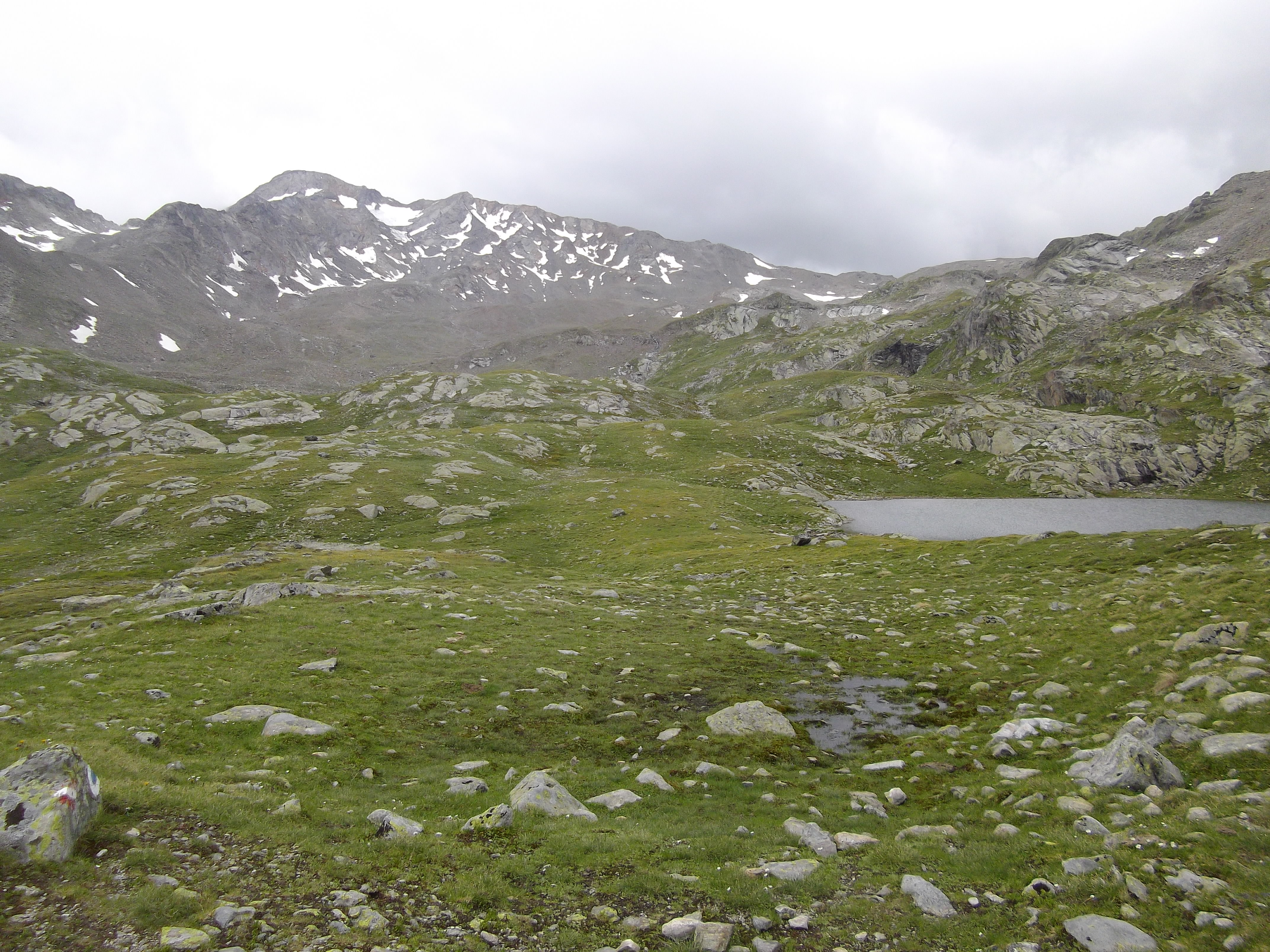
- Pfroslkopf from the north

Highest point
- Elevation: 3,148 m (10,328 ft)
- Prominence: 298 m (978 ft)
- Parent peak: Plattigkopf (Glockturm)
- Listing: Alpine mountains above 3000 m
- Coordinates: 46°58′40″N 10°41′21″E

Geography
- Location within Austria
- Location: Tyrol, Austria
- Parent range: Ötztal Alps

The Pfroslkopf is a mountain in the Glockturmkamm group of the Ötztal Alps.
