= Mont Giusalet =

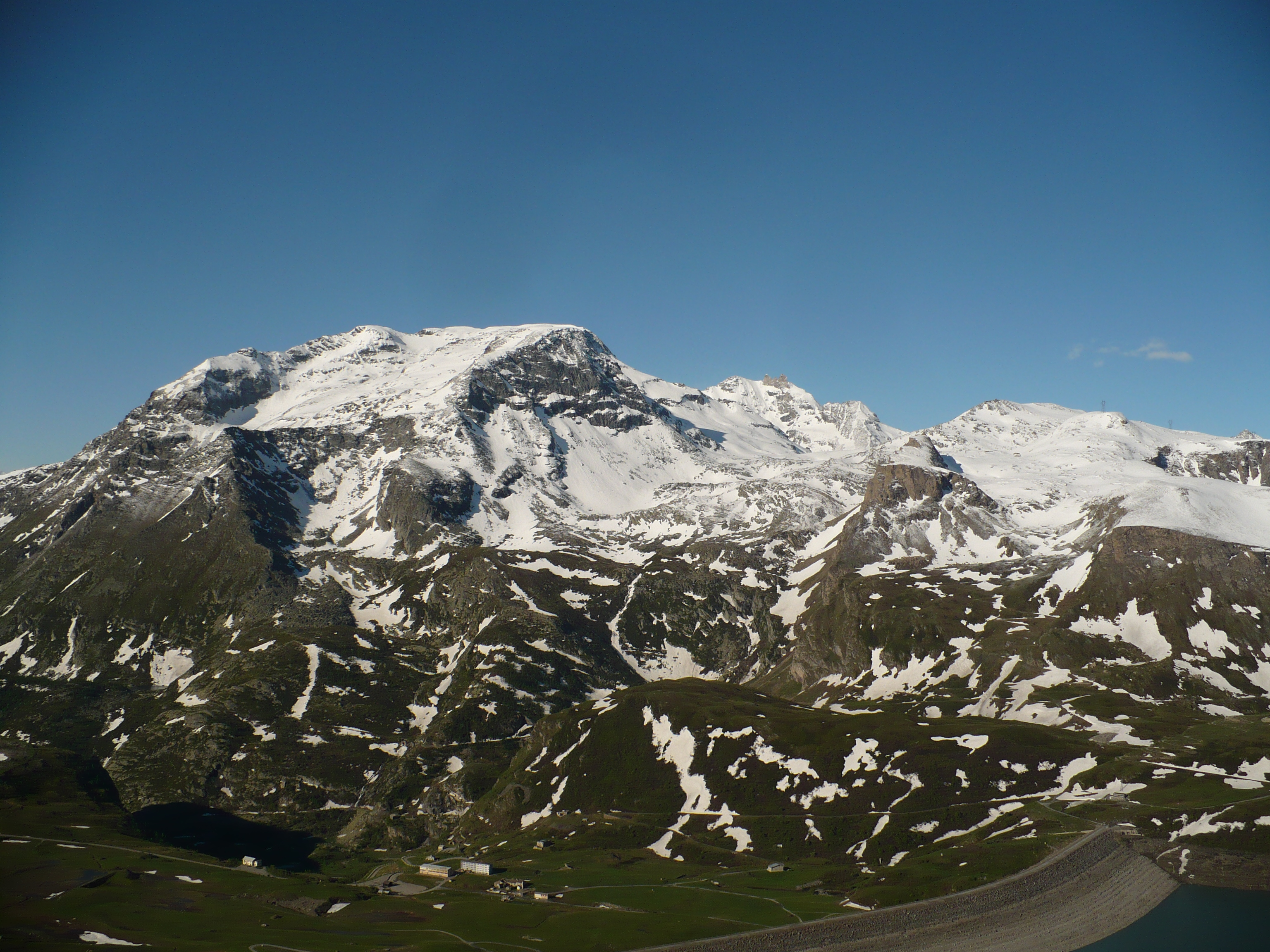

Highest point
- Elevation: 3,312 m (10,866 ft)
- Prominence: 835 m (2,740 ft)
- Isolation: 4.42 km (2.75 mi)
- Listing: Alpine mountains above 3000 m
- Coordinates: 45°11′00″N 06°56′00″E

Geography
- Location within Alps
- Location: Rhône-Alpes, France
- Parent range: Cottian Alps

Mont Giusalet (3,313m - also called pointe du Clery) is a mountain in the Ambin group of the Cottian Alps in Savoie, France, near the Italian border.

== Features ==
The mountain dominates the lower Susa Valley and the town of Susa in Italy, and can even be seen from a large area of the Po Valley.

The mountain, although lying on the Alpine watershed between the Val di Susa and the Arc valley, is entirely in French territory following the boundary adjustments decided in the 1947 Treaty of Paris .

Mont Giusalet is rocky on its southern slopes and covered by a glacier on its northern one. With the two smaller peaks: Cime de Bard (3,150 m) and Punta della Vecchia (2993 m), it forms a small mountain massif. The mountain looks like a long ridge about a mile long going from east to west with two peaks at either end. On the eastern summit lies an Iron Cross.

== Sources ==
- Comptes rendus hebdomadaires des séances de l'Académie des sciences, Volume 151, publiés avec le concours Centre national de la recherche scientifique par MM. les secrétaires perpétuels, 1910; page 665 (online at books.google.fr, consulted in April 2013)
- Monte Giusalet m. 3313 Group of Ambin tab on www.altox.it (accessed April 2013)

== Maps ==
- French official cartography (Institut géographique national - IGN); on-line version: www.geoportail.fr
- Istituto Geografico Centrale - Carta dei sentieri e dei rifugi 1:50.000 nr 2 Valli di Lanzo e Moncenisio
