= Aiguille de Leschaux =

Mountain between Italy and France

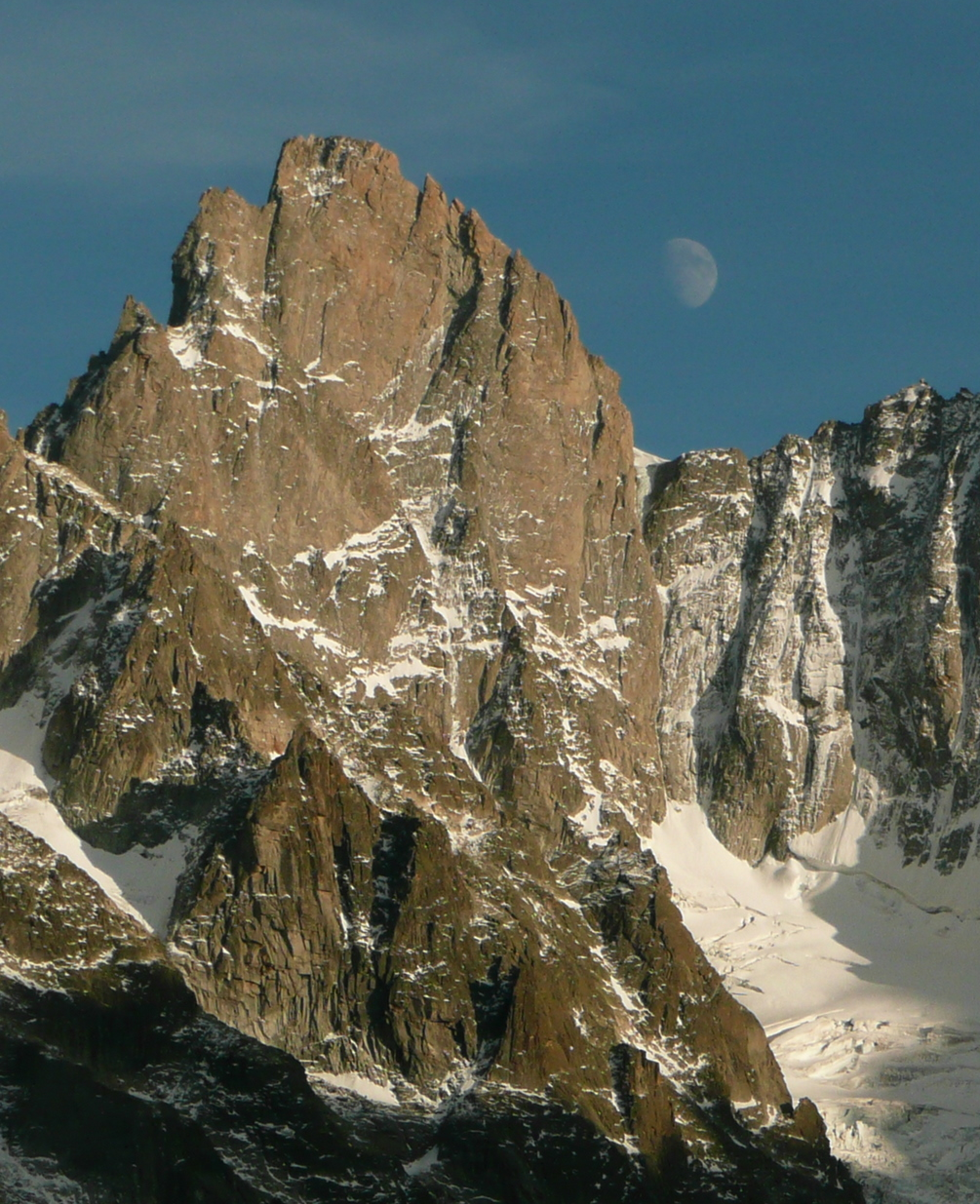
- Aiguille de Leschaux

Highest point
- Elevation: 3,759 m (12,333 ft)
- Prominence: 316 m (1,037 ft)
- Listing: Alpine mountains above 3000 m
- Coordinates: 45°53′14″N 07°00′24″E

Geography
- Location within Alps
- Location: Haute-Savoie, France; Aosta Valley, Italy
- Parent range: Mont Blanc Massif, Graian Alps

Aiguille de Leschaux (3,759 m) is a mountain in the Mont Blanc massif on the border of Haute-Savoie, France and Aosta Valley, Italy.

Located on the eastern side of the Mont Blanc massif on the ridge between Mont Dolent and Grandes Jorasses, the mountain is usually climbed from Val Ferret on the Italian side. The nearest town is Courmayeur.
