= Corno di Ban =

Mountain in Italy

Coordinates: 46°25′03″N 8°21′41″E

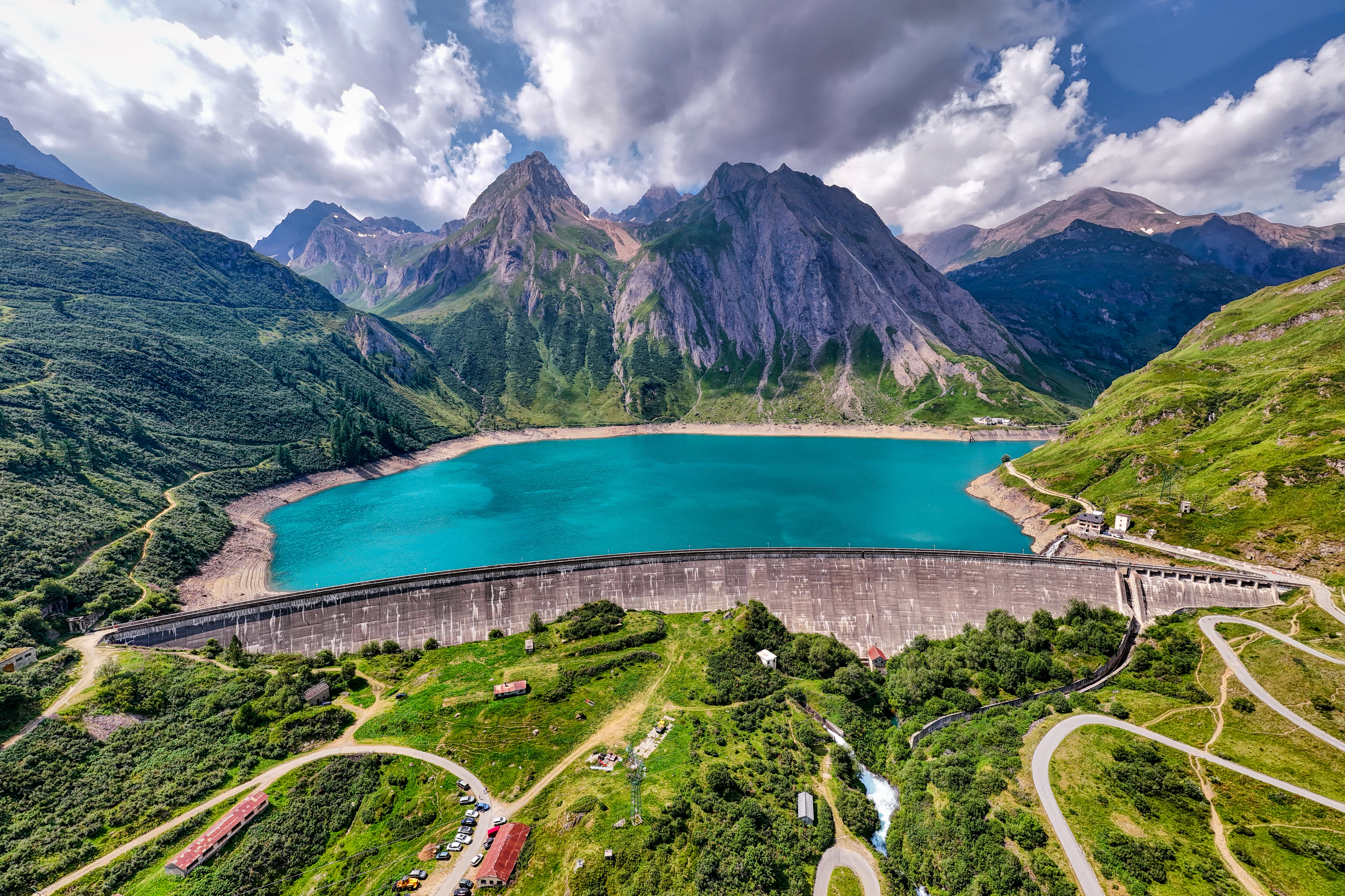
- Lake Morasco with Corno di Ban (center) between Monte Immel (right) and Punta di Morasco (left)

Highest point
- Elevation: 3,028 m (9,934 ft)

Geography
- Location: Piedmont, Italy
- Parent range: Lepontine Alps

Corno di Ban is a mountain of Piedmont, Italy, with an elevation of 3,028 metres (9,934 ft). It is located in the Lepontine Alps, in the Province of Verbano-Cusio-Ossola, a few kilometers from the border with Switzerland.

It is the highest peak of the Ban massif, a group of peaks higher than 2,800 meters (also including Monte Immel, Punta Morasco, Punta del Ghiacciaio di Ban, Gemelli di Ban, Punta Lebendum, Punta dei Camosci, Pizzo del Costone, Pizzo del Vallone, Punta della Sabbia) located between Lake Morasco and Lake Sabbione, in the upper Val Formazza. Corno di Ban is the only three-thousander in the massif.
