= Dômes de Miage =

Line of mountain peaks in the Mont Blanc massif

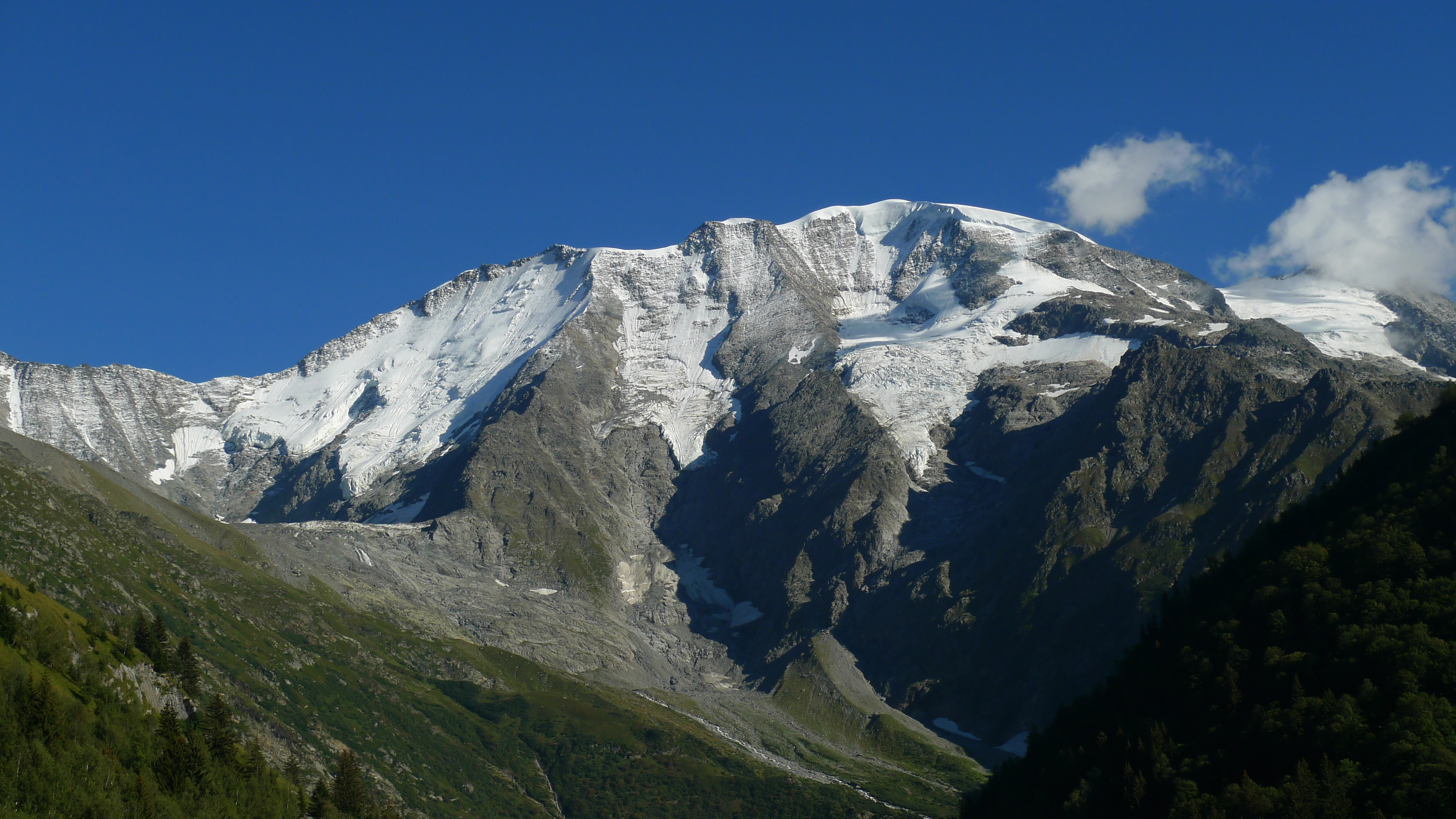
- The Dômes seen from Chalets de Miage

Highest point
- Elevation: 3,673 m (12,051 ft)
- Listing: Alpine mountains above 3000 m
- Coordinates: 45°48′57″N 6°48′00″E

Geography
- Location: Haute-Savoie, Rhône-Alpes, France
- Parent range: Mont Blanc massif

Geology
- Mountain type: Snow-covered arête

Climbing
- First ascent: 2 September 1858, Edmond Thomas Coleman, with Frédéric Mollard and Joseph Jacquemont
- Normal route: Via the Refuge des Conscrits

The Dômes de Miage are a line of mountain peaks in the south of the Mont Blanc massif that reach a height of 3,673 metres. The snow-covered arête from which they rise is over three kilometres long. The six peaks in the chain are (from southwest to northeast): L'Aiguille de la Bérangère (3,425 metres (11,237 ft)), and unnamed tops known only from their heights as Dôme 3670, Dôme 3666, Dôme 3633, Dôme 3673 and Dôme 3672.

The ridge of the dômes de Miage is considered one of the most striking in the Mont Blanc massif.

The normal route starts at the Refuge des Conscrits, crosses the Tré-la-Tête glacier, climbs to Col des Dômes (between tops 3633 and 3673) and follows the arête as far as La Bérangère (PD). A crossing from end to end runs from the Refuge des Conscrits to refuge Durier and is a little more difficult (AD). It is usually combined with the long traverse over the Aiguille de Bionnassay to Mont Blanc.

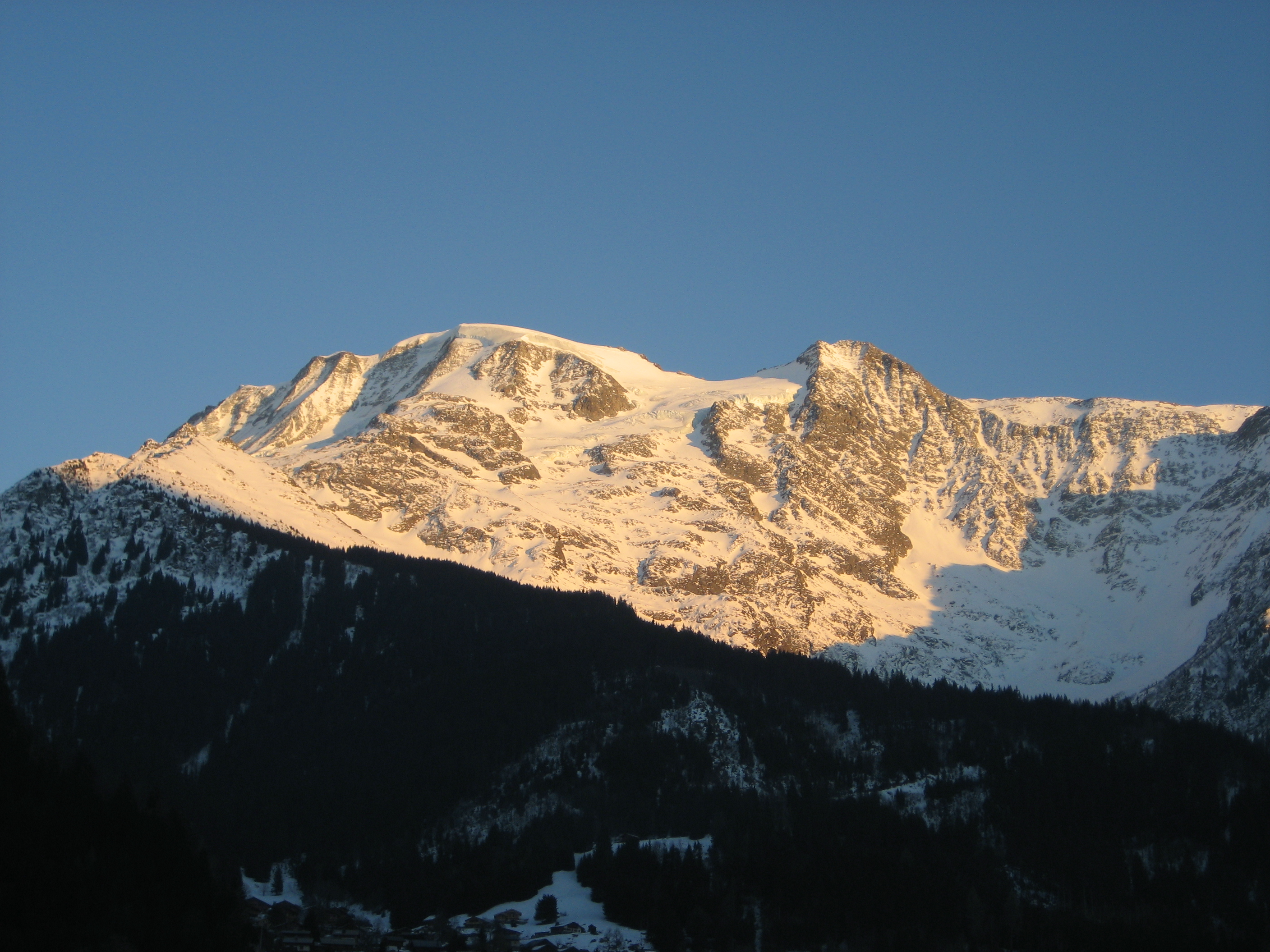
Dômes de Miage at sunset.

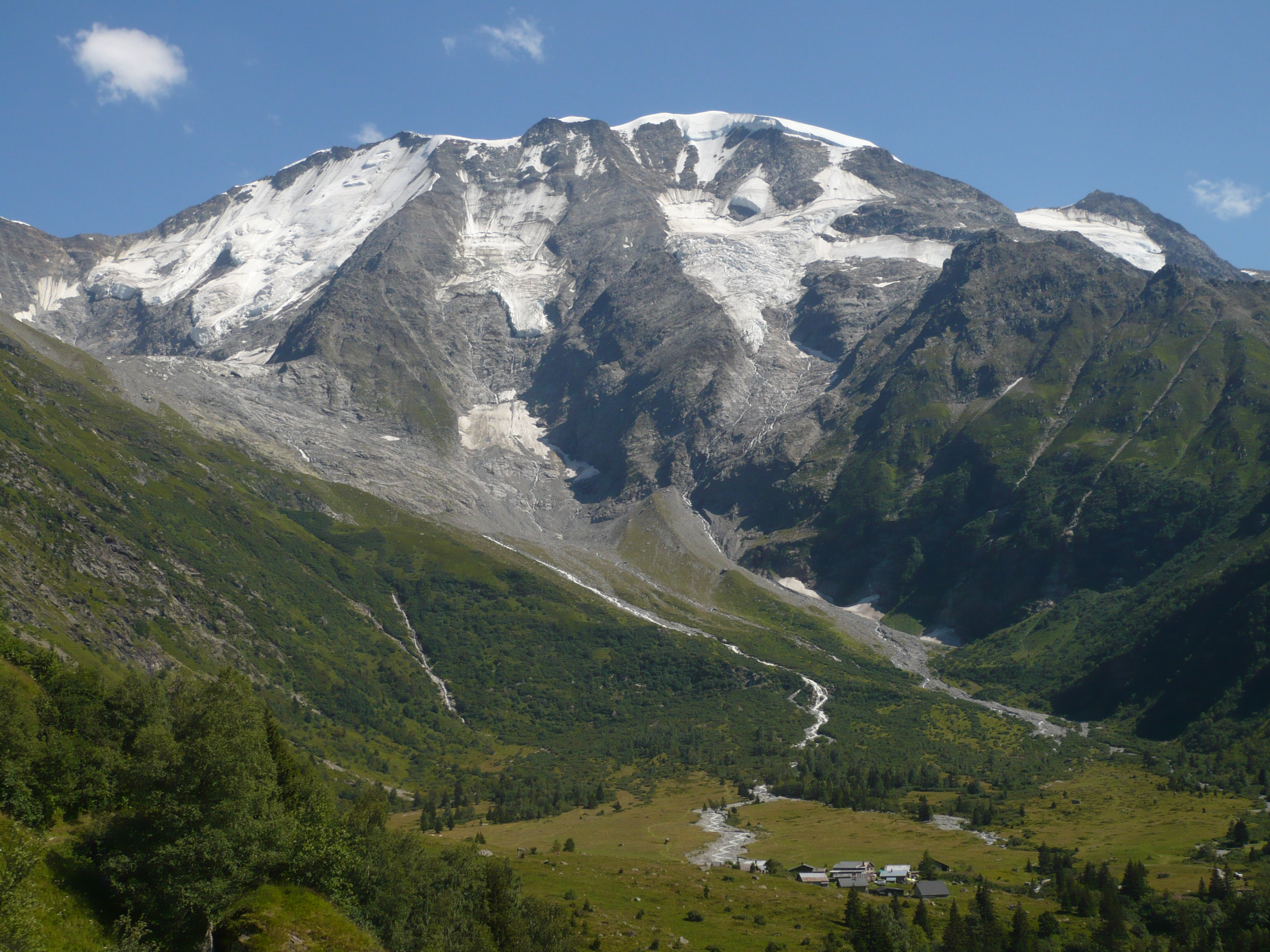
The Dômes with Chalets de Miage in the foreground.

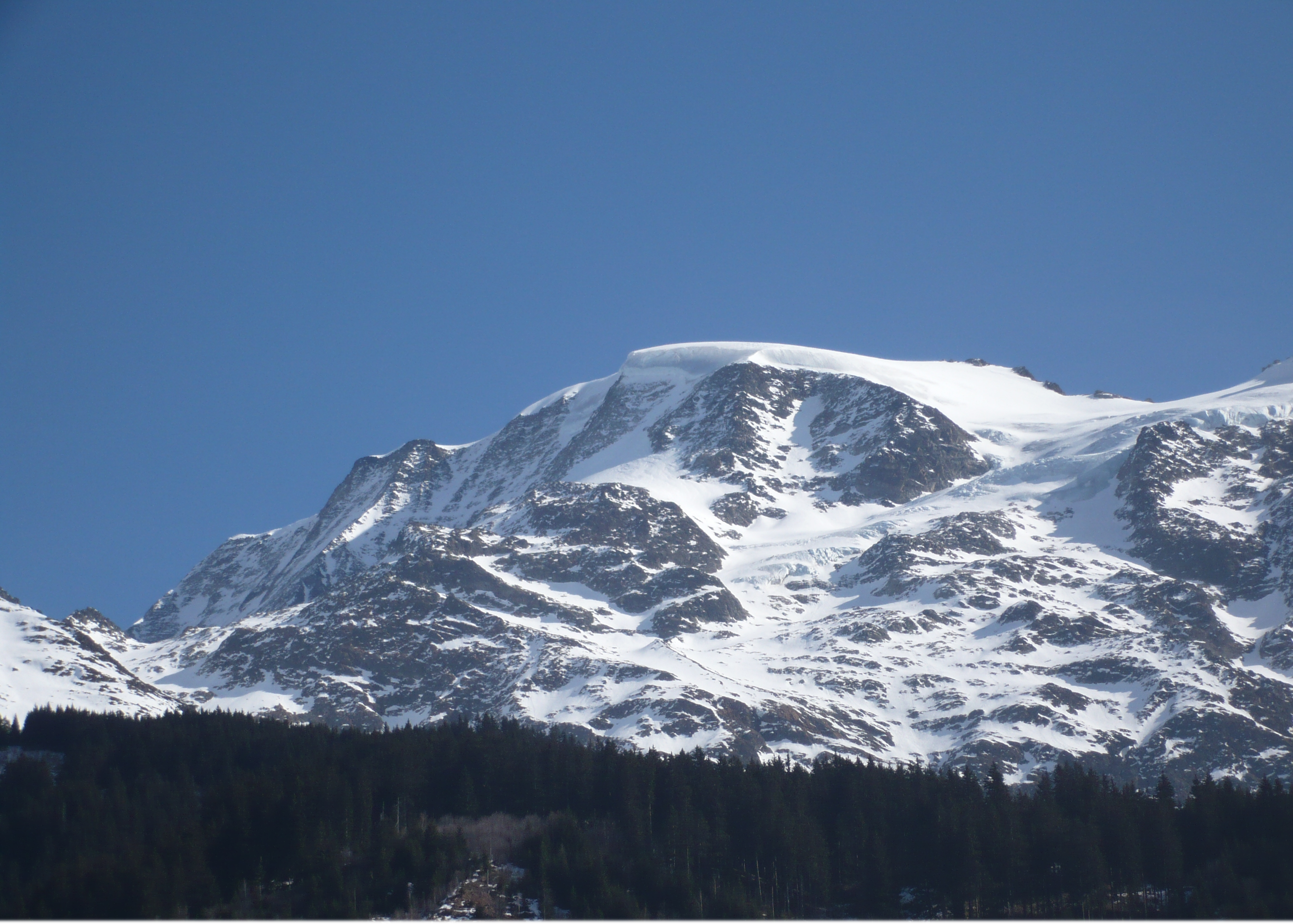
The Dômes in winter seen from the Les Contamines-Montjoie.

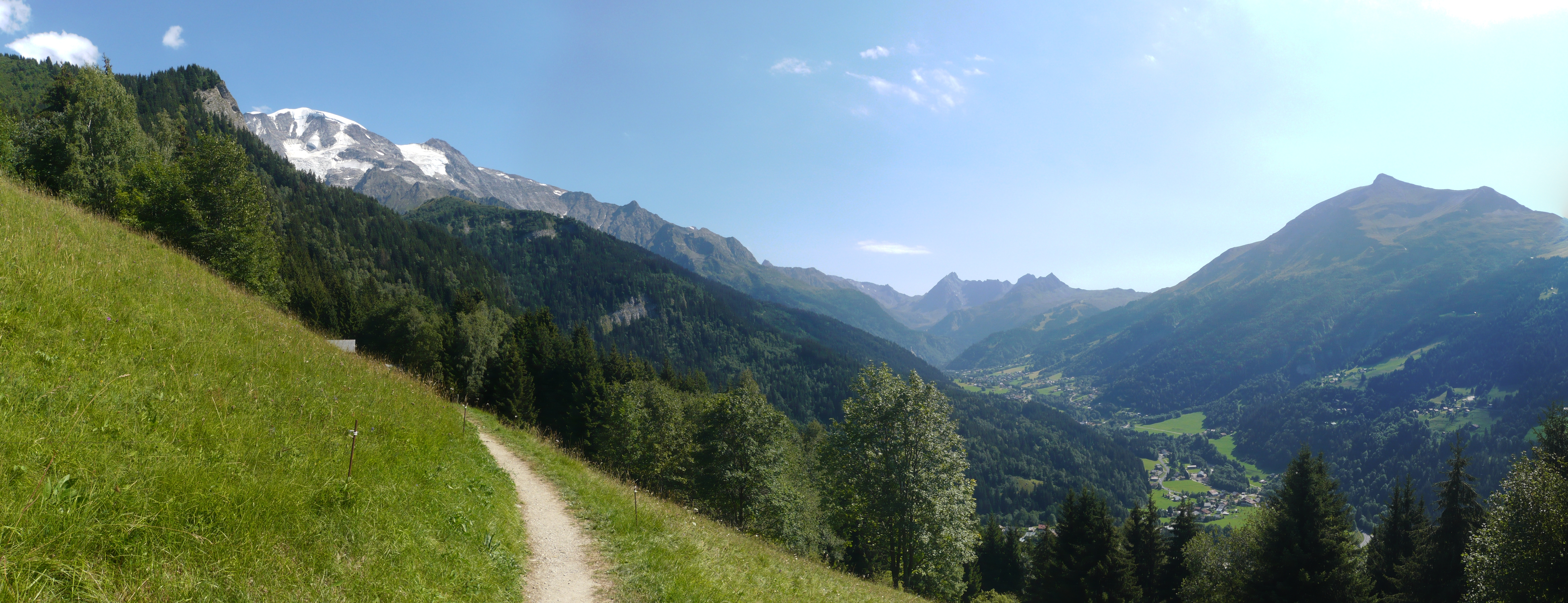
Summer view of the valley of Les Contamines; left: the snow-capped Dômes, facing Mont-Joly.

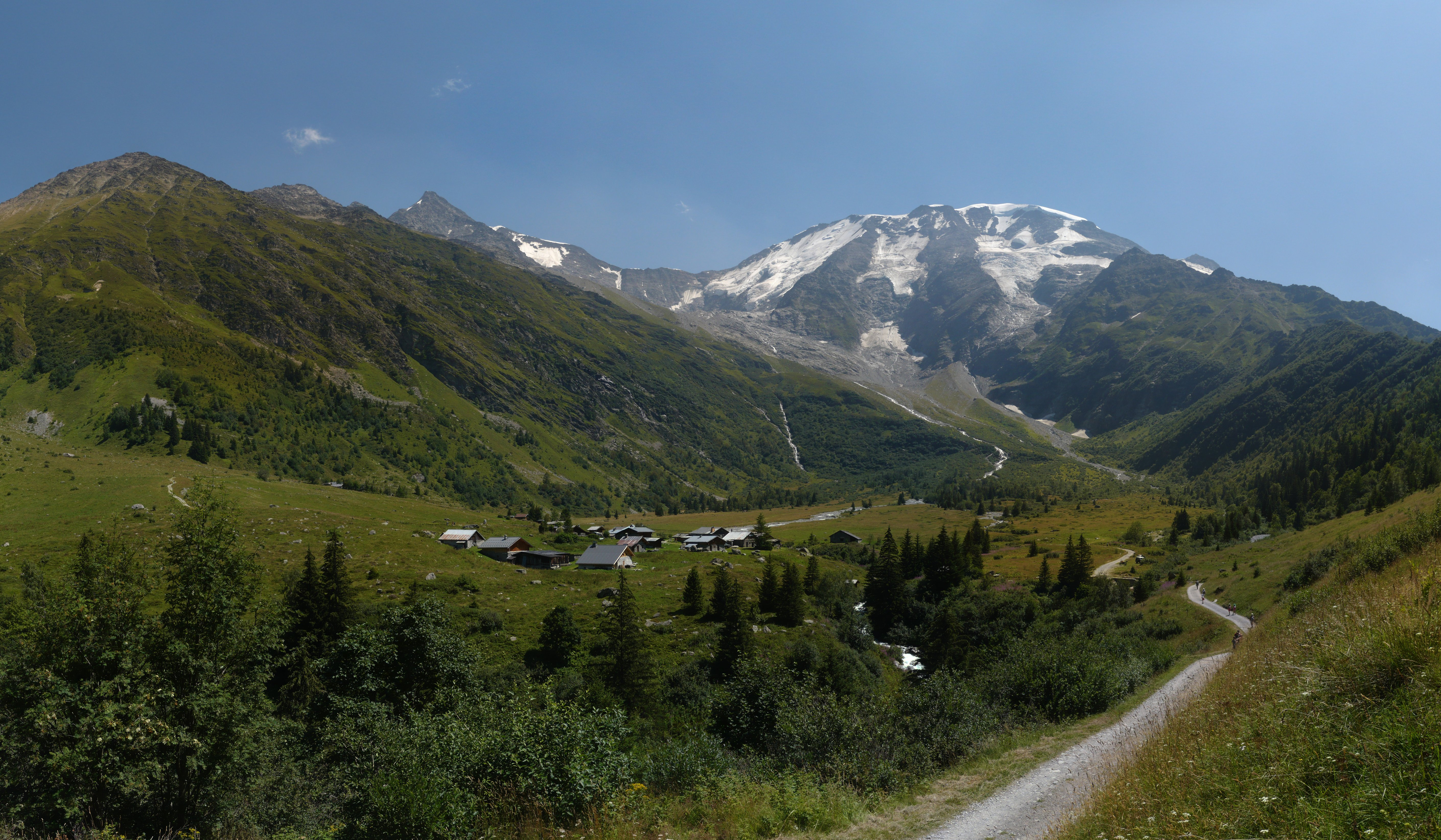
The approach route to the Chalets de Miage, with the Dômes behind.
