= Julius von Payer =

Austro-Hungarian army officer and explorer

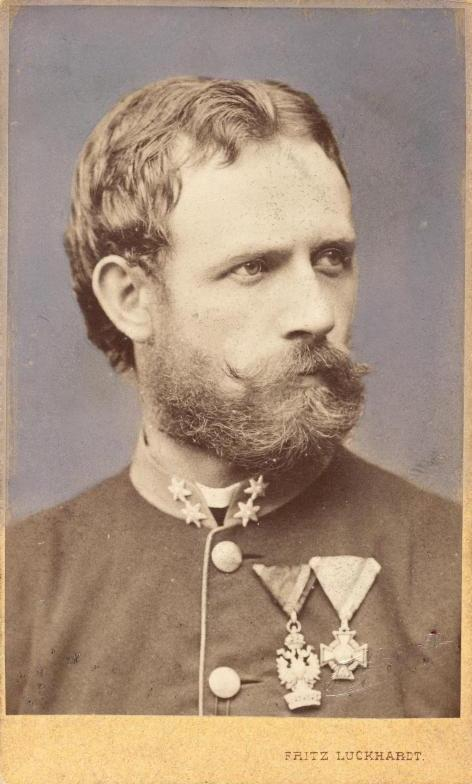
- Julius Payer as First Lieutenant (around 1865)
- Born: 2 September 1841; Schönau (Šanov), Bohemia; Austrian Empire
- Died: 29 August 1915 (aged 73); Veldes (Bled), Carniola; Austria-Hungary
- Resting place: Vienna Central Cemetery
- Known for: Austro-Hungarian North Pole expedition

Julius Johannes Ludovicus Ritter von Payer (2 September 1841 – 29 August 1915), ennobled Ritter von Payer in 1876, was an officer of the Austro-Hungarian Army, mountaineer, arctic explorer, cartographer, painter, and professor at the Theresian Military Academy. He is chiefly known for the Austro-Hungarian North Pole expedition in 1872–1874 and the discovery of Franz Josef Land.

== Early life and military career ==
Born in Schönau, Bohemia, his father Franz Anton Rudolf Payer was a retired officer of the Austrian Uhlans who died when Julius was only fourteen. His mother was Blandine, née John. Payer attended the k.k. cadet school in Łobzów near Kraków, Galicia (present-day Poland). Between 1857 and 1859 he studied at the Theresian Military Academy in Wiener Neustadt.

From 1859, Payer served as a sub-lieutenant with the Austrian 36th infantry regiment in Verona, Venetia. He participated in the disastrous Battle of Solferino on 24 June 1859 and was honoured for his service. After promotion to the rank of lieutenant first class, he was posted to the garrison of Chioggia, Venetia in 1864. On 24 June 1866 he served the Battle of Custoza, seizing two guns, for which he was decorated and elevated to the rank of senior lieutenant.

Since 1863 Payer was assigned as a history and geography teacher to the cadet school in Eisenstadt, Kingdom of Hungary (1526–1867) (present-day Austria) and to the Theresian Military Academy. In 1868 the Austro-Hungarian Minister of War Franz Kuhn von Kuhnenfeld appointed him a general staff officer at the k.k. Military Geographic Institute in Vienna, where he worked with August von Fligely.

== Alpine exploration ==
In 1862 Payer had started exploratory tours of the Tyrolean Alps and the High Tauern range in his free time. After 1864 he explored the Adamello-Presanella Group and the Ortler Alps, making more than 60 first ascents. In 1864 he was, with his guide Giovanni Caturani, the first to climb Adamello (3,554 m) and missed making the first ascent of the Presanella (3,558 m) by just three weeks. All his explorations in the Ortler massif (from 1865 to 1868) were guided by de:Johann Pinggera from Sulden. Together, often accompanied by a porter, they ascended almost all significant unclimbed summits, including the Hoher Angelus (3,521 m), Vertainspitze (3,545 m), Palon de la Mare (3,703 m), Monte Zebru (3,735), and Monte Cevedale (3,769 m). Their new approach to the Ortler (3,905 m) became the normal route of ascent ever since.

His tours resulted in creating a detailed topographical map at a scale 1:56,000. Due to his achievements, Payer was transferred to the Austrian Military Geographic Institute. When in 1875, the first Alpine club hut above 3000 m was built on the normal route to the Ortler, it was named de:Payerhütte in his honor.

== Polar expedition ==
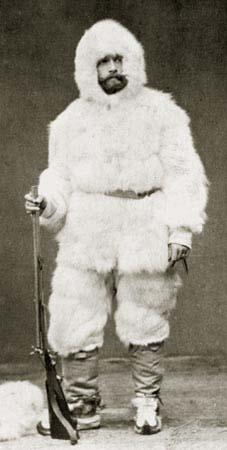
Payer in snow suit

In 1868 he was invited by the German geographer August Petermann to participate in the 2nd German North Polar Expedition as a topographer. Travelling to the coast of East Greenland on the Germania under Captain Carl Koldewey in 1869–1870, they reached as far north as Shannon Island. In 1871 he participated in the preliminary Austro-Hungarian expedition to Novaya Zemlya, with Karl Weyprecht.

From 1872 to 1874, Payer led the Austro-Hungarian North Pole expedition with Karl Weyprecht, who was Commander at sea, while Payer was Commander on shore. During this voyage they made the discovery of Franz Joseph Land, however upon their return to Vienna many critics voiced doubts about its existence and about the experiences of other participants in the expedition. Payer could have proven his statements using testimonies, diaries and sketches, however his efforts were thwarted, including his promotion to captain. In 1874 he resigned from the army because of political maneuvers against him and his brother officers' doubts about his discovery and his sledge journeys. He was awarded 44 florins on 1 October 1874 for the discovery of Franz Joseph Land (about equal to the monthly salary of a Sub-lieutenant at the time). He was also awarded the 1975 Royal Geographical Societys Patron's Medal.

However, on 24 October 1876 he was elevated to the Austrian nobility which entitled him and his descendants to the style of Ritter von in the case of male and von in the case of female offspring.

== Later life ==
In 1877 Ritter von Payer married the ex-wife of a banker from Frankfurt am Main. They later had two children, Jules and Alice.

From 1877 to 1879 he studied painting with Heinrich Hasselhorst at the Städelschule in Frankfurt am Main. From 1880 to 1882 he continued his study of art at the Academy of Fine Arts, Munich.

From 1884 to 1890 he worked as a painter in Paris.

In 1890 he divorced his wife, returned to Vienna and founded a painting school for ladies.

In 1895 he planned a trip for painting to Kejser Franz Joseph Fjord in northeastern (Greenland).

In 1912 he planned (at the age of seventy) an expedition in a submarine to the North Pole.

He died in Veldes, in historic Upper Carniola, today part of Slovenia, in 1915.

== Named after Julius von Payer ==
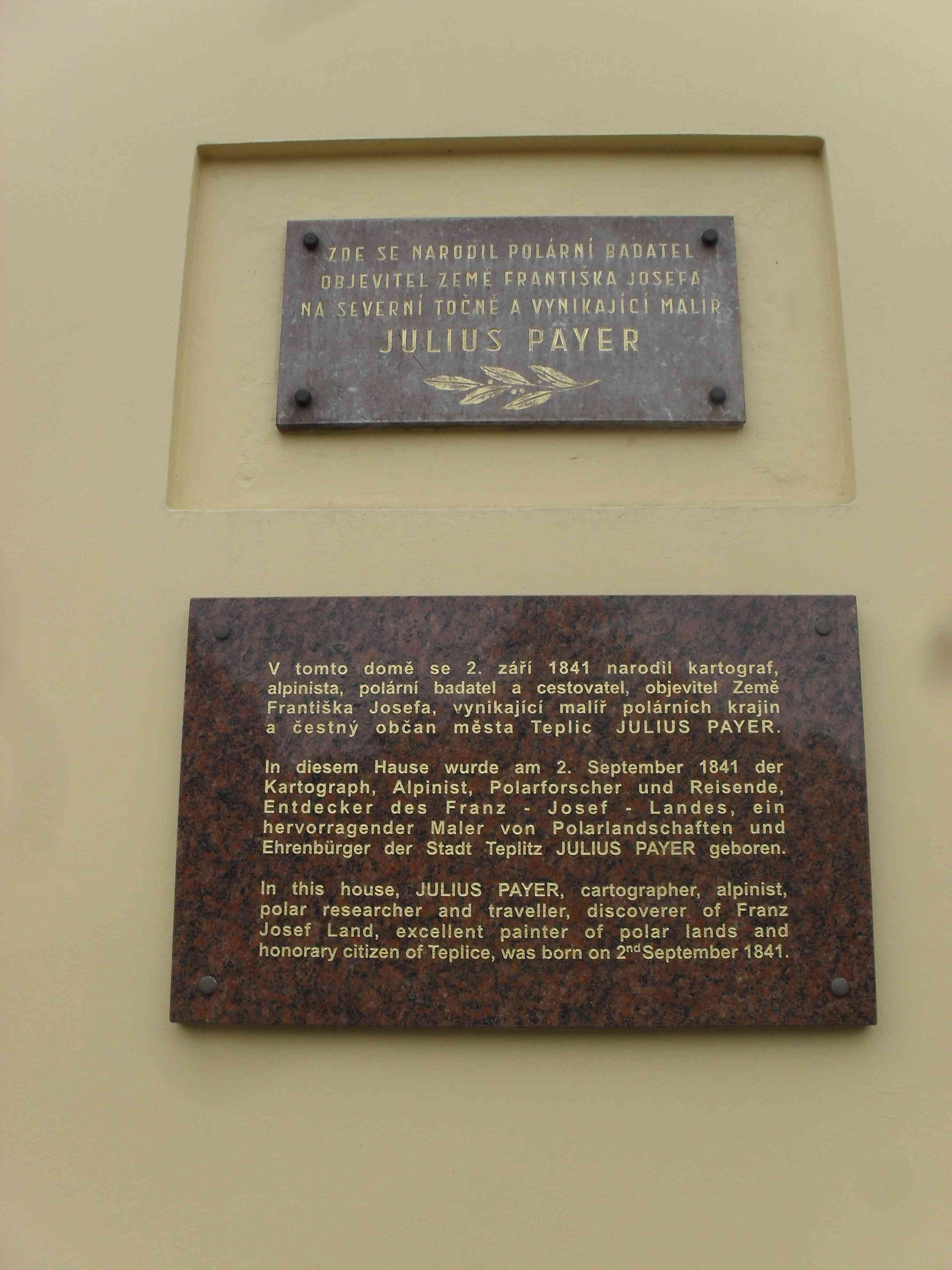
Memorial in Teplice

Besides the Payerhütte mentioned above and several streets in Vienna, an island of Franz Josef Land (Payer Island), the Payer Mountains in Antarctica and Payer Land in eastern Greenland have been named after Julius von Payer.

The southern satellite camp for the PolAres MARS2013 analog mission by the OeWF, approximately 80 km south of the base camp near Erfoud, Morocco, was named Station Payer during February 2013, after the main base camp had been called Camp Weyprecht during the landing ceremony in the morning of 11 February 2013.

== See also ==
- The Austro-Hungarian polar expedition led by Julius von Payer was selected as main motif for the Austrian Admiral Tegetthoff Ship and The Polar Expedition commemorative coin minted on 8 June 2005. The reverse side of the coin shows two explorers in Arctic gear (one of them resembling von Payer) with the frozen ship "Admiral Tegetthoff" behind them.
- Payer Island

== Bibliography ==
- Julius von Payer, Die Österreich-Ungarische Nordpol Expedition in den Jahren 1869–1874 (Wien 1876) (The Austro-Hungarian North Pole Expedition of 1869 to 1874", Vienna, 1876)
- Andreas Pöschek: Geheimnis Nordpol. Die Österreichisch-Ungarische Nordpolexpedition 1872–1874. - Wien: 1999 (download as PDF)
