= Piz Schumbraida =

Mountain in Switzerland

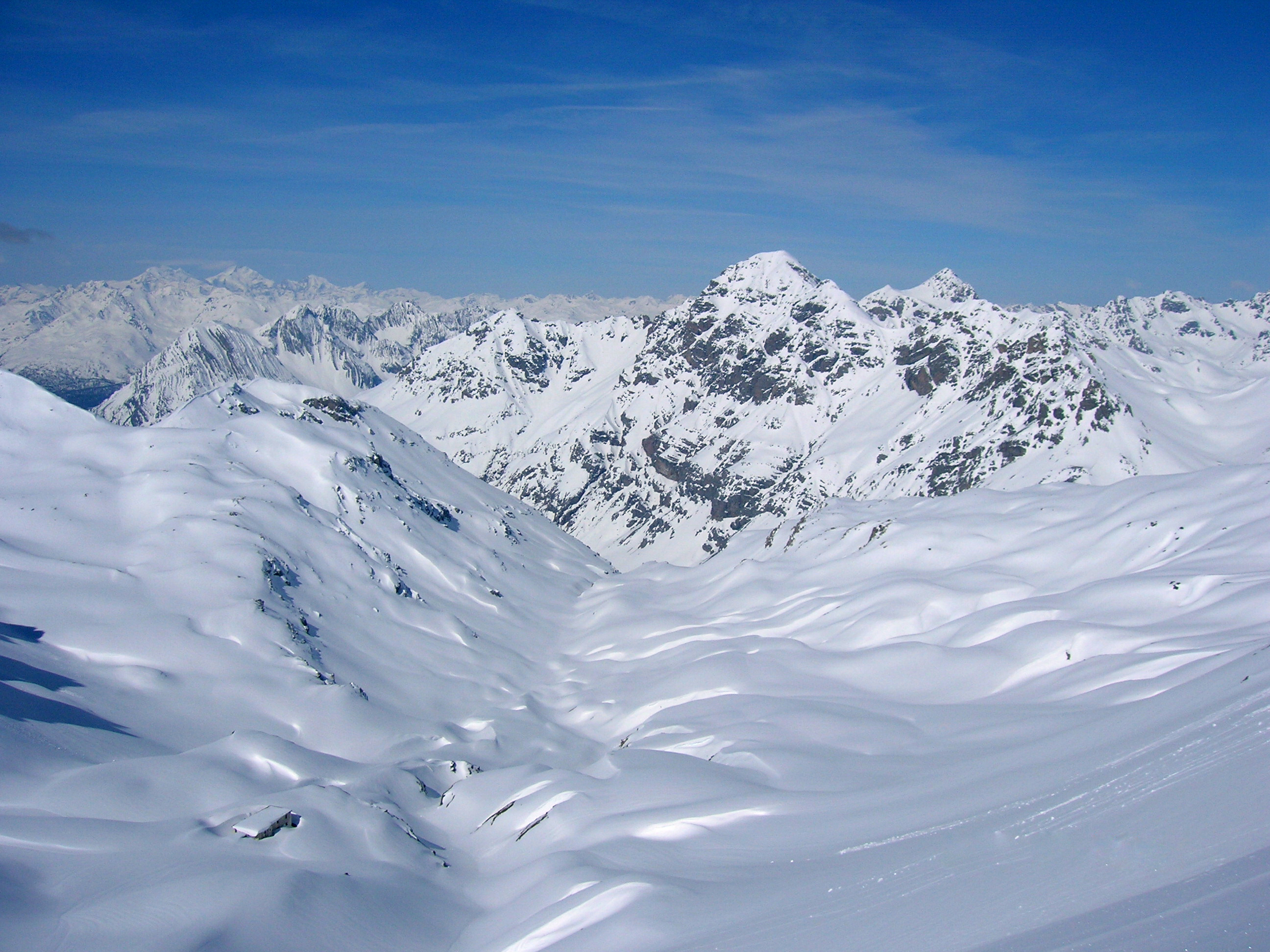
- Piz Schumbraida (center-right summit) from the east

Highest point
- Elevation: 3,125 m (10,253 ft)
- Prominence: 315 m (1,033 ft)
- Parent peak: Piz Murtaröl
- Listing: Alpine mountains above 3000 m
- Coordinates: 46°32′34″N 10°20′18″E

Geography
- Location within Alps
- Location: Lombardy, Italy; Graubünden, Switzerland
- Parent range: Ortler Alps

Piz Schumbraida is a mountain of the Ortler Alps, located on the border between Italy and Switzerland. It lies east of Piz Tea Fondada.
