= Schafberg =

Schafberg may refer to:

- Schafberg (VS, Obergoms), a mountain range east of the Grimsel Pass in Switzerland
- Schafberg (BE, Boltigen), a mountain peak in the Bernese Alps of Switzerland above Boltigen
- Schafberg (Löbau), a mountain in Saxony, Germany
- Schafberg (Ortler Alps), a mountain in the Ortler Alps on the border between Switzerland and Italy
- Schafberg (Salzkammergut), a mountain in the Salzkammergut of Austria
- Schafberg (Swabian Jura), a mountain in Baden-Württemberg, Germany
- Schafberg (Vienna), a mountain in the Vienna Woods, Austria
- Schafberg (Vorarlberg), a mountain in the Alps in Vorarlberg, Austria
