= Cima del Serraglio =

Mountain in Switzerland

- Location within Alps

Highest point
- Elevation: 2,685 m (8,809 ft)
- Prominence: 353 m (1,158 ft)
- Parent peak: Piz Turettas
- Listing: Alpine mountains 2500-2999 m
- Coordinates: 46°35′32″N 10°14′32″E

Geography
- Location: Graubünden, Switzerland; Lombardy, Italy
- Parent range: Ortler Alps

The Cima del Serraglio is a mountain of the Ortler Alps, located on the border between Italy and Switzerland. It lies between the lake of Livigno (Lombardy) and the Val Mora (Graubünden).
