= Piz Costainas =

Mountain in Switzerland

- Furkelspitz
- Location within Alps

Highest point
- Elevation: 3,004 m (9,856 ft)
- Prominence: 199 m (653 ft)
- Parent peak: Piz Cotschen
- Coordinates: 46°33′46″N 10°28′25″E

Geography
- Location: South Tyrol, Italy, Graubünden, Switzerland
- Parent range: Ortler Alps

Piz Costainas (also known as Furkelspitz) is a mountain of the Ortler Alps, straddling the Swiss-Italian border between Graubünden and South Tyrol. It is the easternmost mountain rising above 3,000 metres in Switzerland.
