= Piz Lad (Ortler Alps) =

Mountain in Switzerland

- Location within Switzerland

Highest point
- Elevation: 2,882 m (9,455 ft)
- Prominence: 89 m (292 ft)
- Parent peak: Piz Umbrail
- Coordinates: 46°34′15.1″N 10°24′34.4″E

Geography
- Location: Graubünden, Switzerland
- Parent range: Ortler Alps

Piz Lad is a mountain of the Swiss Ortler Alps, overlooking Santa Maria Val Müstair in the canton of Graubünden. It lies north of Piz Umbrail.
