= Munt la Schera =

Mountain in Switzerland

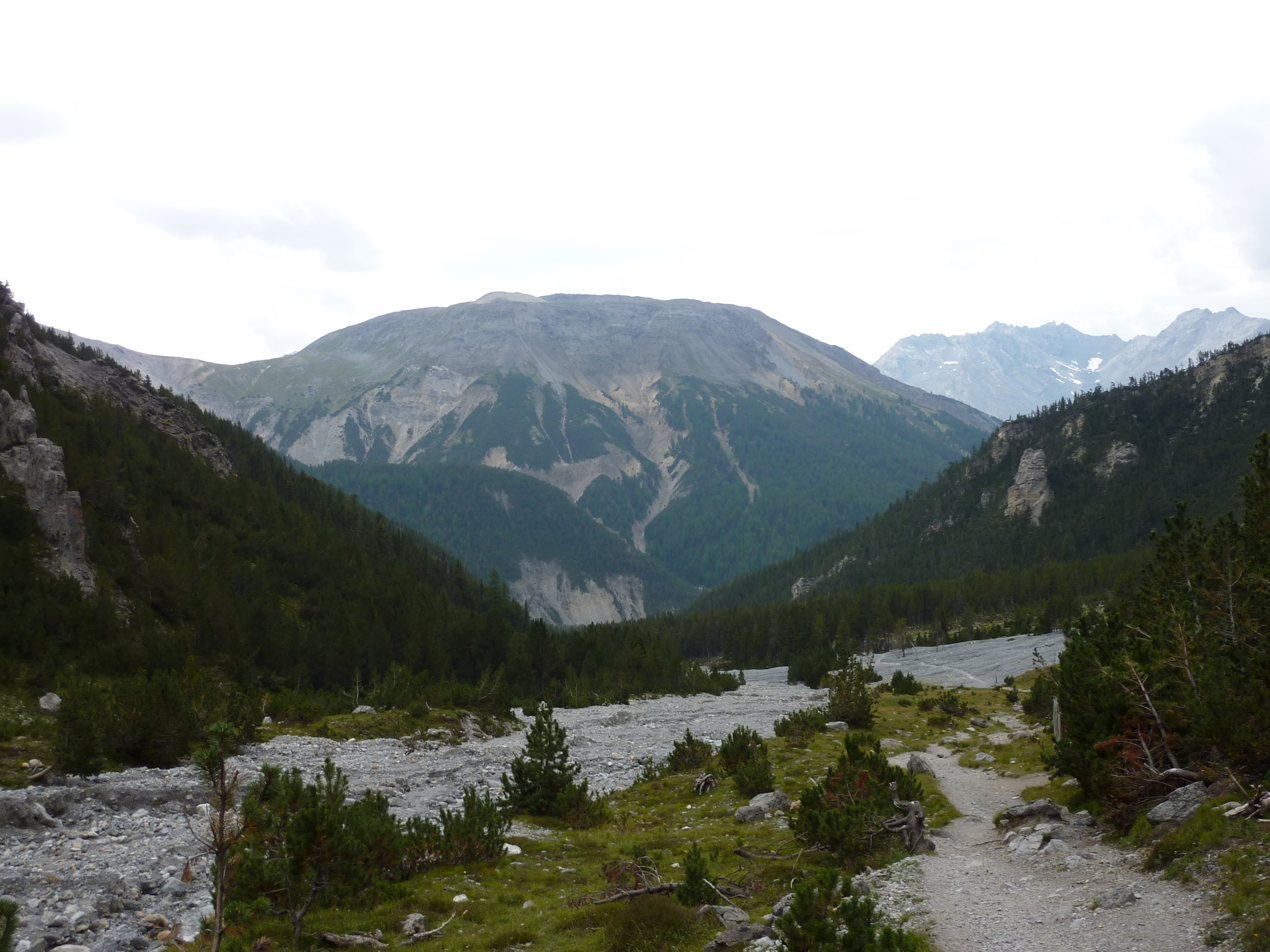

Highest point
- Elevation: 2,587 m (8,488 ft)
- Prominence: 209 m (686 ft)
- Parent peak: Munt Buffalora
- Coordinates: 46°38′42″N 10°12′39″E

Geography
- Location within Switzerland
- Location: Graubünden, Switzerland
- Parent range: Ortler Alps

Munt la Schera (Romansh pronunciation: [ˌmʊntlɐˈʃɛːrɐ]; 2,587 m) is a mountain of the Ortler Alps, located south of Il Fuorn (east of Zernez) in the canton of Graubünden.

The Munt la Schera Tunnel runs inside the mountain at a height of approximately 1,800 metres (5,910 ft).
