= Monte Confinale =

Mountain in Italy

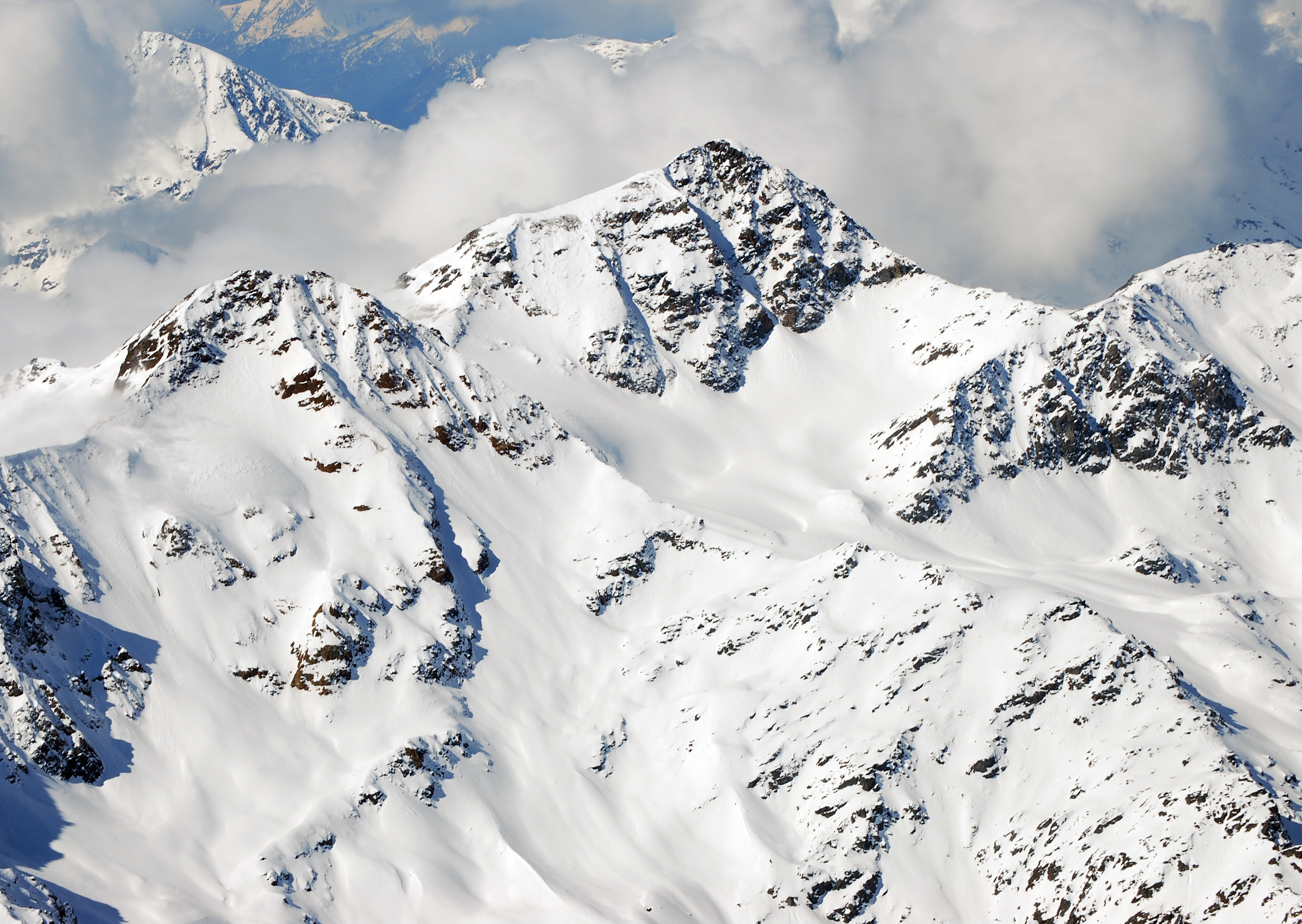
- Monte Confinale from Gran Zebrù

Highest point
- Elevation: 3,370 m (11,060 ft)
- Prominence: 376 m (1,234 ft)
- Listing: Alpine mountains above 3000 m
- Coordinates: 46°26′56″N 10°30′14″E

Geography
- Location within Alps
- Location: Lombardy, Italy
- Parent range: Ortler Alps

Monte Confinale (3,370m) is a mountain of the Ortler Alps in Lombardy, northern Italy.

Located in the Stelvio National Park east of Bormio, it is usually climbed from the nearby Forni hotel at 2,178 m in altitude or lower down from the village of Santa Caterina di Valfurva to the northeast.
