= Piz Cotschen (Ortler Alps) =

Mountain in Switzerland

- Rötlspitz - Punta Rosa
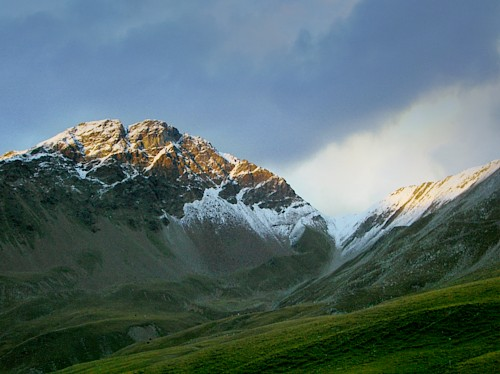
- View of the west side from the Umbrail Pass

Highest point
- Elevation: 3,026 m (9,928 ft)
- Prominence: 269 m (883 ft)
- Parent peak: Ortler
- Listing: Mountains of Switzerland
- Coordinates: 46°32′29.2″N 10°27′31.2″E

Geography
- Location within Switzerland
- Location: Graubünden, Switzerland (mountain partially in Italy)
- Parent range: Ortler Alps

Piz Cotschen, also named Rötlspitz or Punta Rosa, is a mountain of the Ortler Alps, overlooking both the Umbrail and Stelvio Pass. Its summit is located within the Swiss canton of Graubünden, near the border with Italy.
