= Monte Forcola =

Mountain in Switzerland

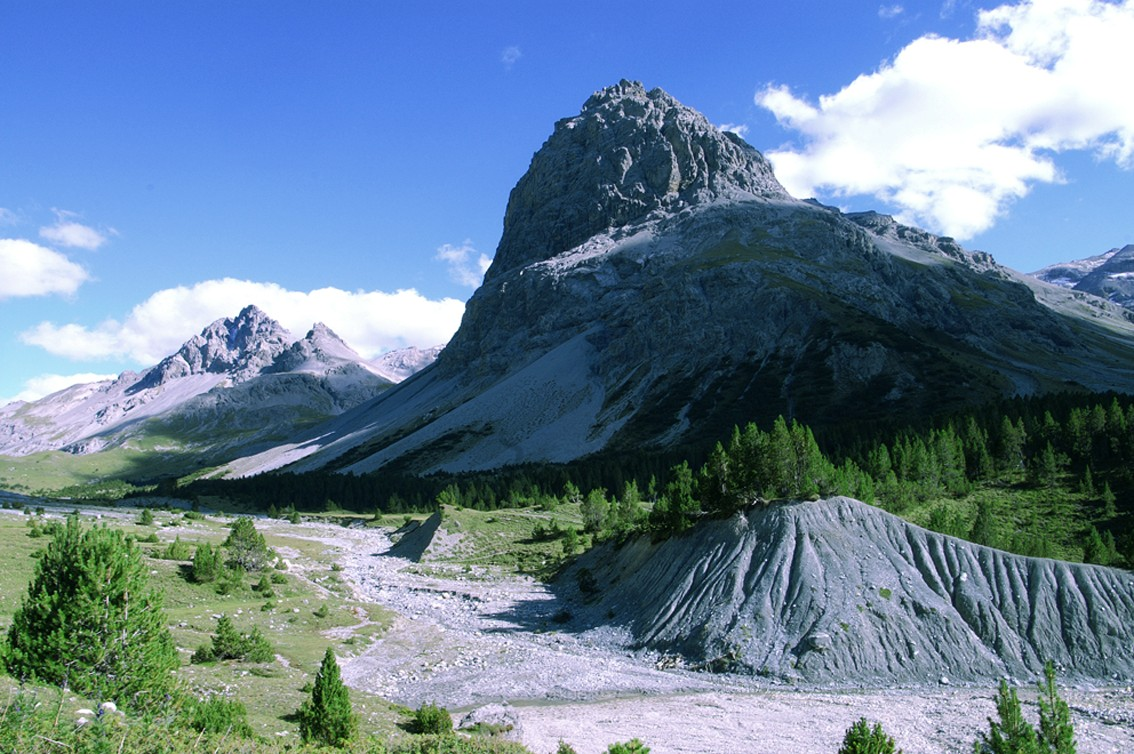
- Monte Forcola (left) and Cuclèr da Jon dad Onsch (centre)

Highest point
- Elevation: 2,906 m (9,534 ft)
- Prominence: 141 m (463 ft)
- Parent peak: Piz Umbrail
- Coordinates: 46°33′26.9″N 10°21′02.2″E

Geography
- Location within Switzerland
- Location: Graubünden, Switzerland (mountain partially in Italy)
- Parent range: Ortler Alps

Monte Forcola (2,906 m) is a peak in Graubünden, Switzerland, close to the Italian border. Approximately 200 metres south of the summit (at the Italian border) is located the triple watershed of the Adige, Po and Danube basins (2,896 m).
