= Tuckettspitze =

Mountain in Italy

- Location within Alps

Highest point
- Elevation: 3,462 m (11,358 ft)
- Coordinates: 46°29′56″N 10°29′19″E

Geography
- Location: South Tyrol / Province of Sondrio (both Italy)
- Parent range: Ortler Alps

Climbing
- First ascent: 12 September 1866 by Julius Payer and Johann Pinggera

The Tuckettspitze (Italian: Cima Tuckett; German: Tuckettspitze) is a mountain in the Ortler Alps in South Tyrol, Italy.
