= Hintere Eggenspitze =

Mountain in Italy

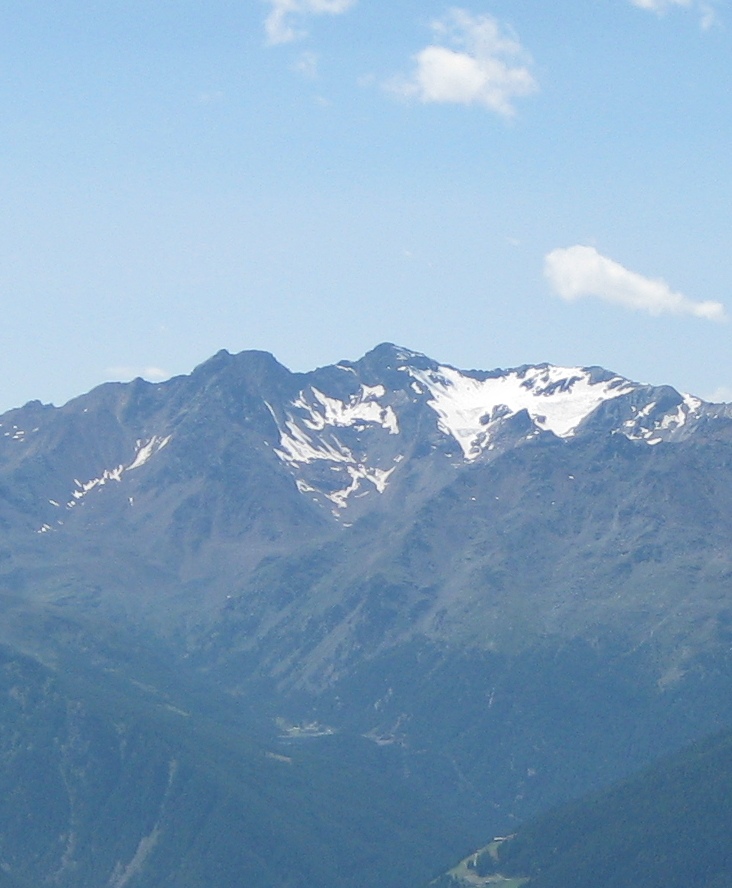
- Eggenspitzen von der Ultner Hochwart

Highest point
- Elevation: 3,443 m (11,296 ft)
- Listing: Alpine mountains above 3000 m
- Coordinates: 46°28′44″N 10°46′37″E

Geography
- Location within Alps
- Location: South Tyrol / Trentino (both Italy)
- Parent range: Ortler Alps

Climbing
- First ascent: 30 July 1868 by Julius Payer and Johann Pinggera

The Hintere Eggenspitze (Italian: Cima Sternai; German: Hintere Eggenspitze) is a mountain in the Ortler Alps on the border between South Tyrol and Trentino, Italy.
