= Zufrittspitze =

Mountain in Italy

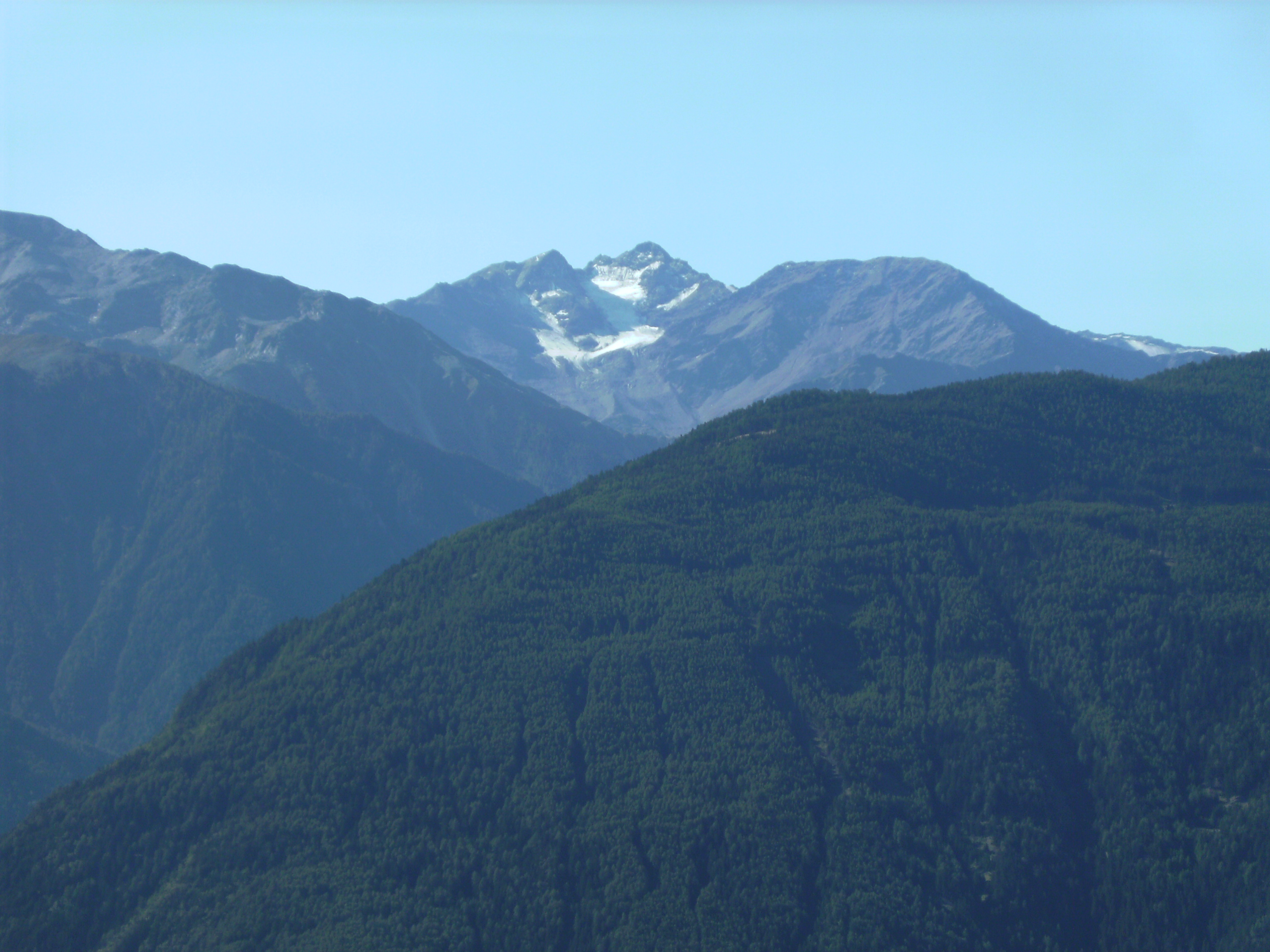
- Zufrittspitze, 2007

Highest point
- Elevation: 3,439 m (11,283 ft)
- Listing: Alpine mountains above 3000 m
- Coordinates: 46°30′08″N 10°46′55″E

Geography
- Location within Alps
- Location: South Tyrol / Trentino (both Italy)
- Parent range: Ortler Alps

Climbing
- First ascent: 9 August 1868 by Julius Payer, Johann Pinggera and two unknown porters

The Zufrittspitze is a mountain in the Ortler Alps on the border between South Tyrol and Trentino, Italy.

== Climate ==
Climate data for Zufritt Reservoir: 1851m (1991−2020 normals, extremes 1973−present)
Month	Jan	Feb	Mar	Apr	May	Jun	Jul	Aug	Sep	Oct	Nov	Dec	Year
Record high °C (°F)	11.0 (51.8)	14.0 (57.2)	15.0 (59.0)	17.0 (62.6)	24.0 (75.2)	27.0 (80.6)	27.0 (80.6)	27.0 (80.6)	24.0 (75.2)	20.0 (68.0)	15.0 (59.0)	13.0 (55.4)	27.0 (80.6)
Mean daily maximum °C (°F)	−1.9 (28.6)	0.4 (32.7)	3.6 (38.5)	6.9 (44.4)	11.4 (52.5)	15.6 (60.1)	17.2 (63.0)	16.8 (62.2)	12.7 (54.9)	8.6 (47.5)	3.0 (37.4)	−1.6 (29.1)	7.7 (45.9)
Daily mean °C (°F)	−6.6 (20.1)	−5.2 (22.6)	−1.7 (28.9)	2.0 (35.6)	6.7 (44.1)	10.7 (51.3)	12.5 (54.5)	12.3 (54.1)	8.7 (47.7)	4.9 (40.8)	0.1 (32.2)	−5.1 (22.8)	3.3 (37.9)
Mean daily minimum °C (°F)	−11.3 (11.7)	−10.8 (12.6)	−7.0 (19.4)	−3.0 (26.6)	2.1 (35.8)	5.9 (42.6)	7.8 (46.0)	7.8 (46.0)	4.6 (40.3)	1.2 (34.2)	−2.8 (27.0)	−8.7 (16.3)	−1.2 (29.9)
Record low °C (°F)	−28.0 (−18.4)	−26.0 (−14.8)	−25.0 (−13.0)	−17.0 (1.4)	−12.0 (10.4)	−4.0 (24.8)	−2.0 (28.4)	−1.0 (30.2)	−3.0 (26.6)	−11.0 (12.2)	−17.0 (1.4)	−26.0 (−14.8)	−28.0 (−18.4)
Average precipitation mm (inches)	28.3 (1.11)	28.6 (1.13)	41.2 (1.62)	59.9 (2.36)	73.9 (2.91)	77.9 (3.07)	74.3 (2.93)	79.8 (3.14)	75.3 (2.96)	90.9 (3.58)	93.7 (3.69)	47.5 (1.87)	771.3 (30.37)
Average precipitation days (≥ 1.0 mm)	5.2	4.9	6.1	8.8	10.7	11.5	11.1	11.6	9.1	9.0	8.7	5.9	102.6
Source: Landeswetterdienst Südtirol
