= Hoher Angelus =

Mountain in Italy

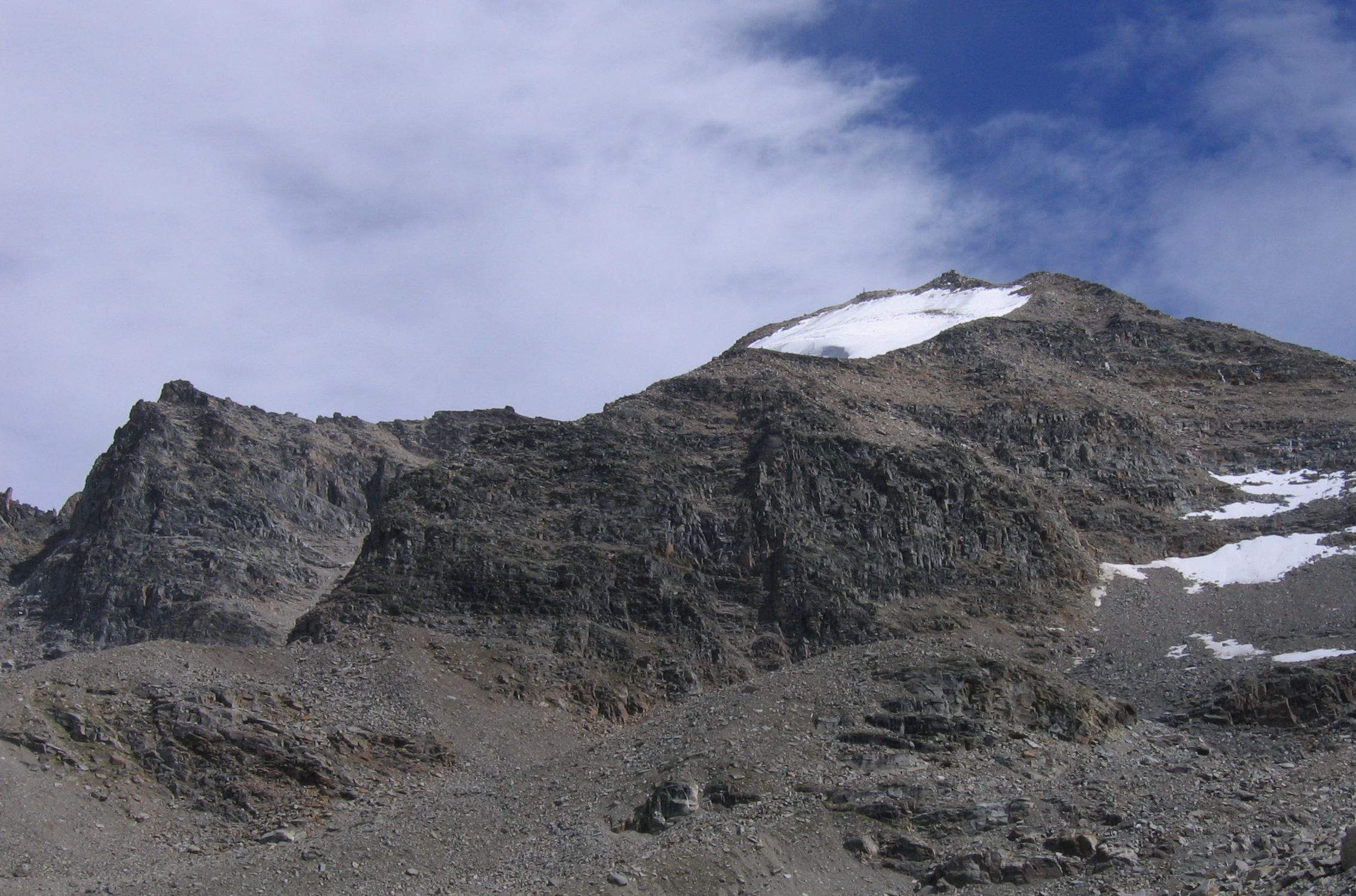
- Hoher Angelus

Highest point
- Elevation: 3,521 m (11,552 ft)
- Coordinates: 46°32′44″N 10°38′50″E

Geography
- Location: South Tyrol, Italy
- Parent range: Ortler Alps

Climbing
- First ascent: 8 August 1868 by Julius Payer, Johann Pinggera, and an unknown porter

The Hoher Angelus (also German Hohe Angelusspitze; Italian: L'Angelo Grande [ˈlandʒelo ˈɡrande]) is a mountain in the Ortler Alps in South Tyrol, Italy.
