= Hasenöhrl (Ortler Alps) =

Mountain in Italy

- Orecchia di Lepre
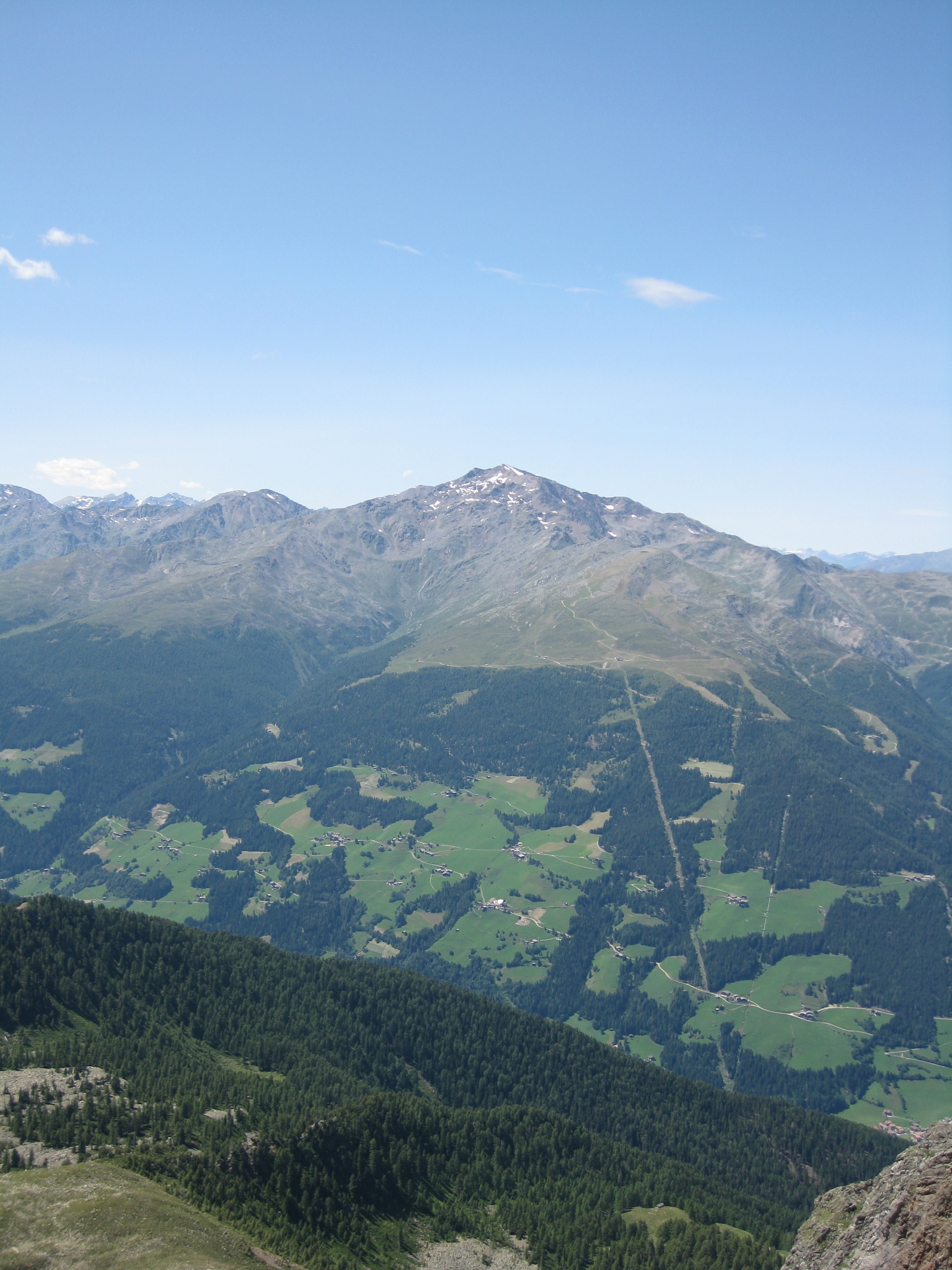

Highest point
- Elevation: 3,257 m (10,686 ft)
- Prominence: 375 m (1,230 ft)
- Listing: Alpine mountains above 3000 m
- Coordinates: 46°32′42″N 10°51′28″E

Geography
- Location within Italy
- Location: South Tyrol, Italy
- Parent range: Ortler Alps

Climbing
- First ascent: 17 August 1895 by Alexander Burckhardt

Hasenöhrl (3,257 m) is a mountain of the Ortler Alps in South Tyrol, Italy.

The easternmost summit of the Ortlers, it is located in a triangle between the valleys of Val Martello, Ulten Valley and Vinschgau. It is a popular peak to climb due to its relative ease and far reaching views which include the Ötztal Alps, the Adamello-Presanella Alps and the Dolomites.
