= Monte Vioz =

Mountain in Italy

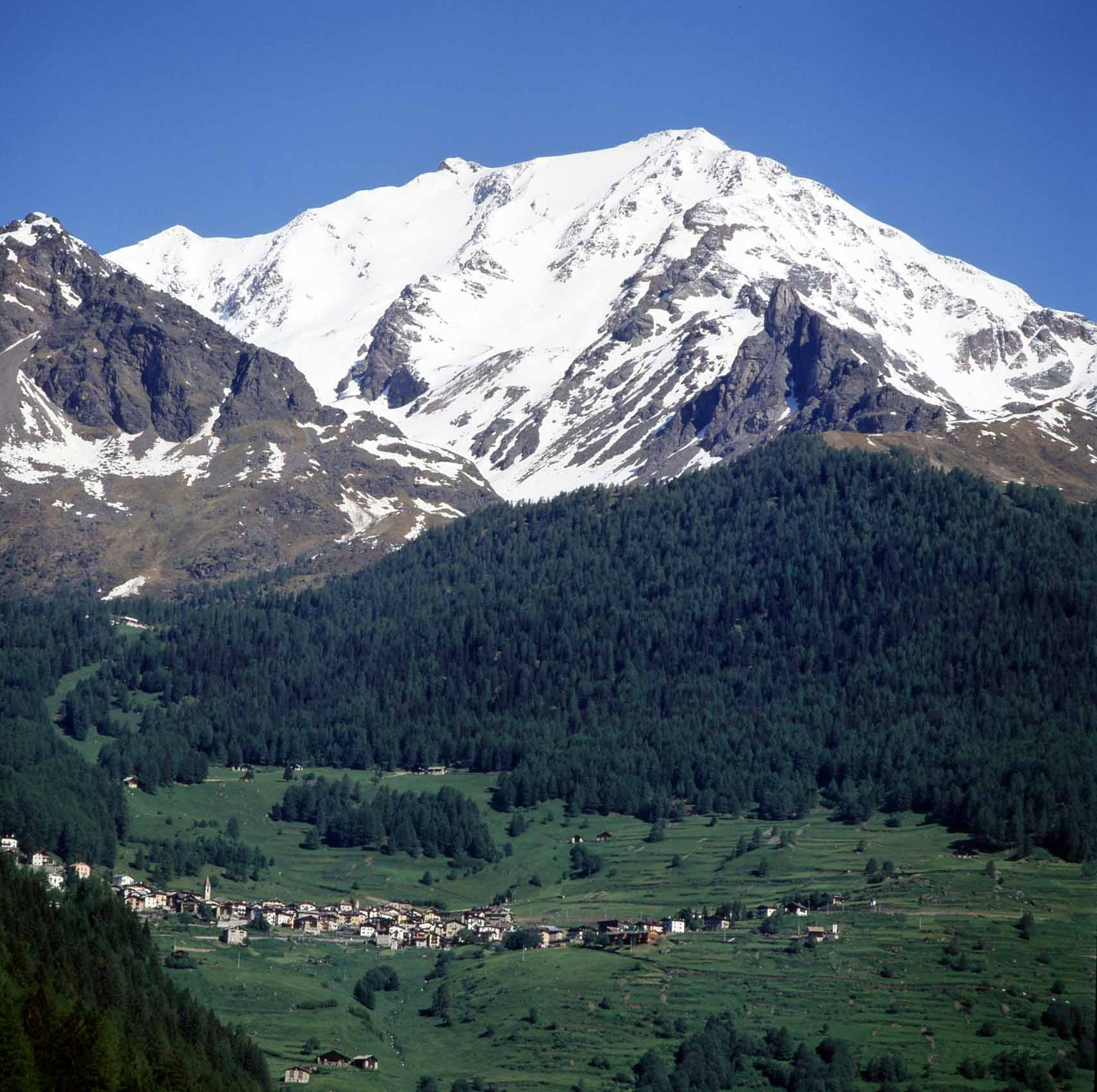
- Monte Vioz from the south, with the village Peio in the foreground.

Highest point
- Elevation: 3,645 m (11,959 ft)
- Coordinates: 46°24′06″N 10°37′59″E

Geography
- Location within Alps
- Location: Border between Lombardy and Trentino, Italy
- Parent range: Ortler Alps

Climbing
- Easiest route: Pèio Fonti

Monte Vioz is a 3,645 metres (11,959 ft) mountain in Northern Italy, on the border between Lombardy and Trentino. It is located in the Ortler Alps.

The Forni glacier (Ghiacciaio dei Forni) lies on the west side of Monte Vioz, flowing into the Valle dei Forni. On the east side of the mountain lies the glacier Vedretta Rossa, and the smaller glacier Vedretta di Vioz is on the south side of the mountain.

The most popular climbing route is from the trailhead at Pèio Fonti, a cable car to the refuge Doss dei Cembri, and a 1,350 metre climb from there. 100 metres (330 ft) below the summit is the Mantova del Vioz refuge. The best season to climb is from June to September.

== See also ==
- The Alps
- Mountains
