= Schildspitze =

Mountain in Italy

- Location within Alps

Highest point
- Elevation: 3,461 m (11,355 ft)
- Coordinates: 46°31′42″N 10°38′55″E

Geography
- Location: South Tyrol, Italy
- Parent range: Ortler Alps

Climbing
- First ascent: 8 August 1868 by Julius Payer, Johann Pinggera and an unknown porter

The Schildspitze is a mountain in the Ortler Alps in South Tyrol, Italy.
