= Tschenglser Hochwand =

Mountain in Italy

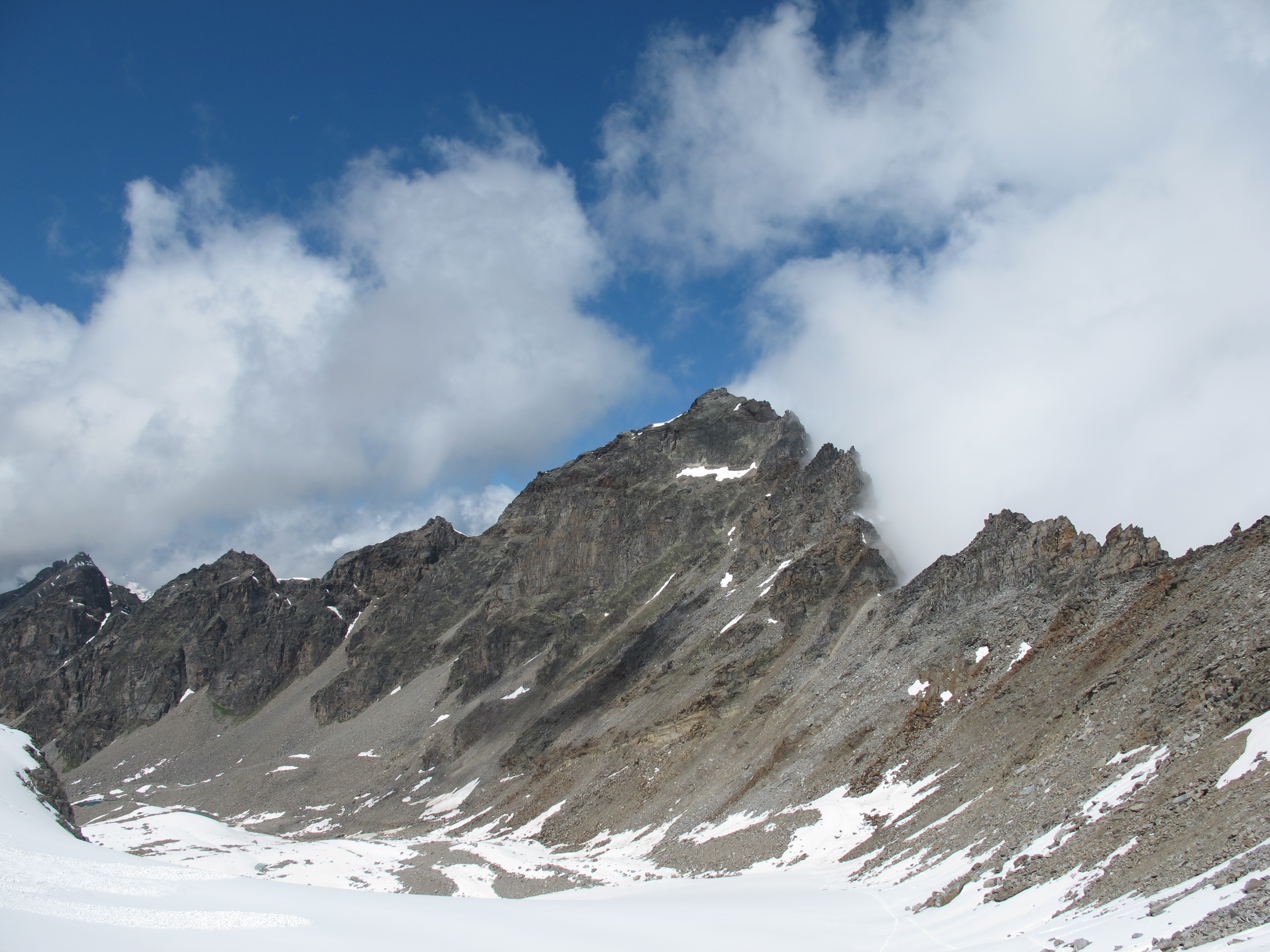

Highest point
- Elevation: 3,375 m (11,073 ft)
- Coordinates: 46°33′54″N 10°37′40″E

Geography
- Location: South Tyrol, Italy
- Parent range: Ortler Alps

Climbing
- First ascent: 3 September 1871 by Victor Hecht and Johann Pinggera

The Tschenglser Hochwand (Italian: Croda di Cengles) is a mountain in the Ortler Alps in South Tyrol, Italy.
