= Hintere Schöntaufspitze =

Mountain in Italy

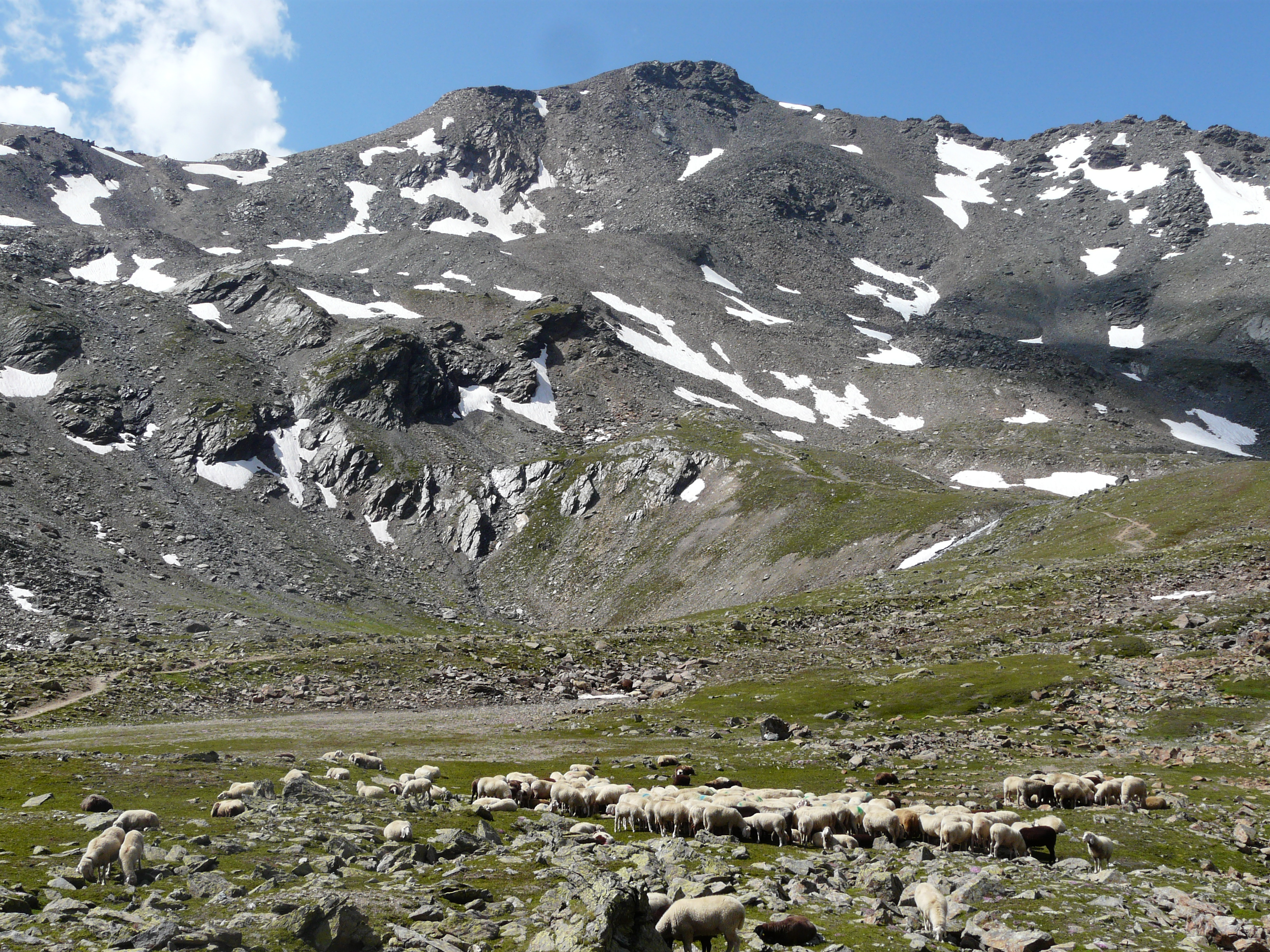

Highest point
- Elevation: 3,325 m (10,909 ft)
- Coordinates: 46°30′10″N 10°37′43″E

Geography
- Location within Alps
- Location: South Tyrol, Italy
- Parent range: Ortler Alps

Climbing
- First ascent: August 1865 by Edmund Mojsisovics and Sebastian Janiger

The Hintere Schöntaufspitze is a mountain in the Ortler Alps in South Tyrol, Italy.
