= Veneziaspitze =

Mountain in Italy

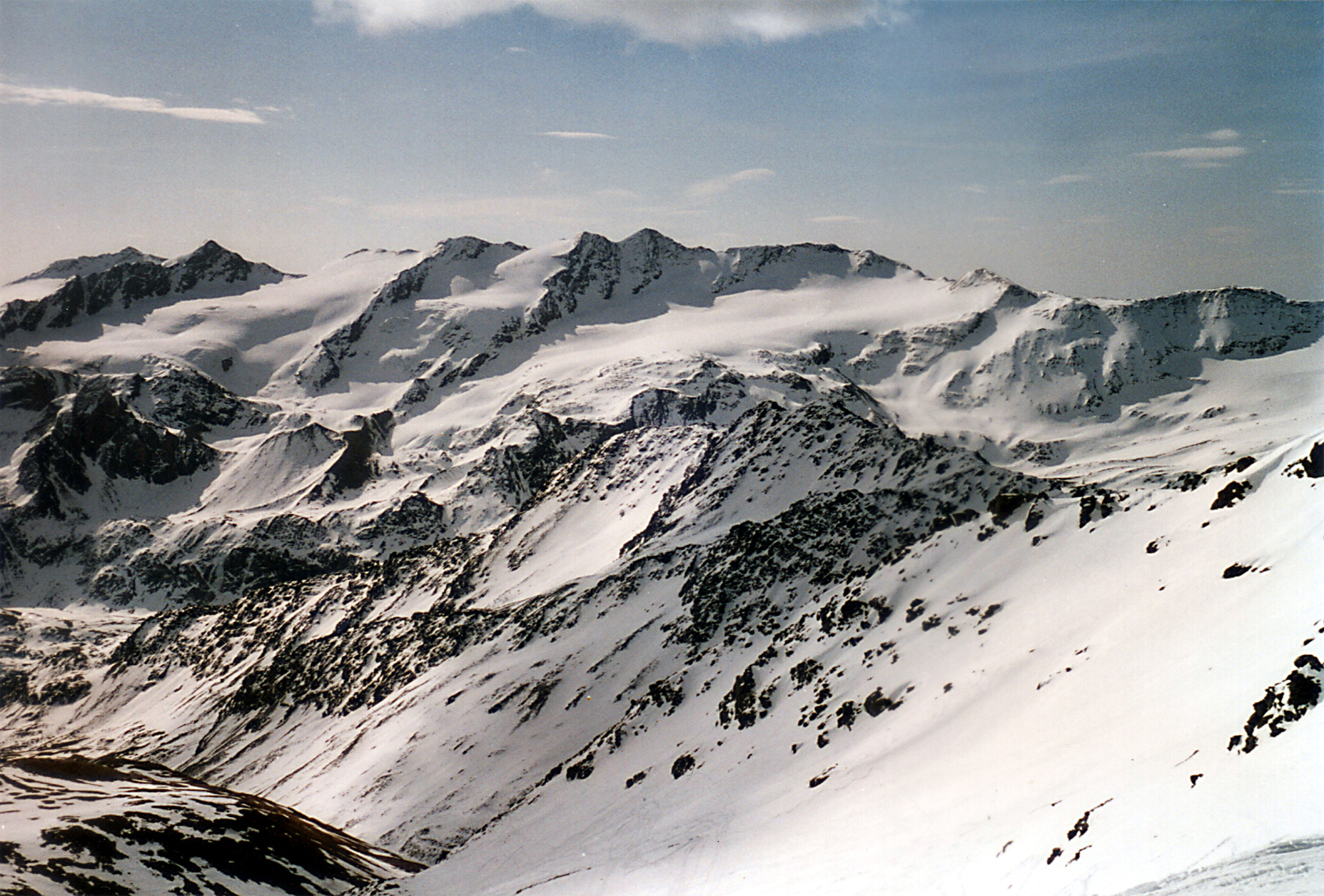

Highest point
- Elevation: 3,386 m (11,109 ft)
- Listing: Alpine mountains above 3000 m
- Coordinates: 46°27′17″N 10°41′20″E

Geography
- Location: South Tyrol / Trentino (both Italy)
- Parent range: Ortler Alps

Climbing
- First ascent: 24 September 1867 by Julius Payer and Johann Pinggera

The Veneziaspitze (Italian: Cima Venezia; German: Veneziaspitze) is a mountain in the Ortler Alps on the border between South Tyrol and Trentino, Italy.
