= Piz Minschuns =

Mountain in Switzerland

- Schafberg
- Location within Alps

Highest point
- Elevation: 2,934 m (9,626 ft)
- Prominence: 193 m (633 ft)
- Parent peak: Ortler
- Coordinates: 46°34′52″N 10°29′00″E

Geography
- Location: Graubünden, Switzerland / South Tyrol, Italy
- Parent range: Ortler Alps

Piz Minschuns (Romansh) or Schafberg (German) is a mountain in the Fallaschkamm mountains, a subgroup of the Ortler Alps, more precisely on the eastern edge of the Val Costainas, located on the border between Italy and Switzerland.
