= Piz Tea Fondada =

Mountain in Switzerland

- Monte Cornaccia
- Location within Alps

Highest point
- Elevation: 3,144 m (10,315 ft)
- Prominence: 319 m (1,047 ft)
- Parent peak: Piz Murtaröl
- Listing: Alpine mountains above 3000 m
- Coordinates: 46°32′58″N 10°18′29″E

Geography
- Location: Lombardy, Italy; Graubünden, Switzerland
- Parent range: Ortler Alps

Piz Tea Fondada (Italian: Monte Cornaccia) is a mountain of the Ortler Alps, located on the border between Italy and Switzerland. On its southern Italian side it overlooks Lake Cancano. On its northern Swiss side it overlooks the Val da Tea Fondada, part of the Val Mora.
