= Piz Turettas =

Mountain in Switzerland

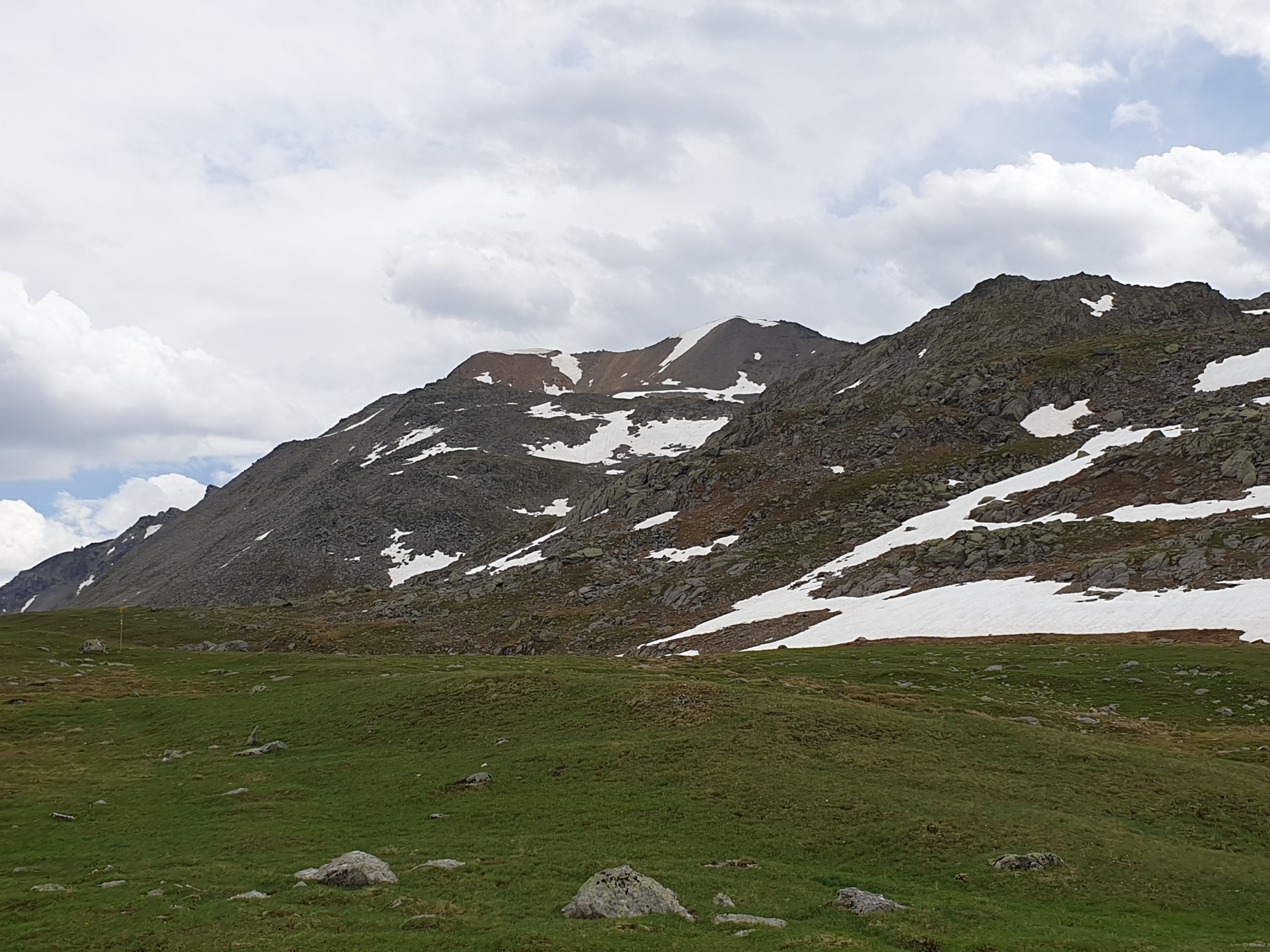
- Piz Turettas

Highest point
- Elevation: 2,963 m (9,721 ft)
- Prominence: 400 m (1,300 ft)
- Parent peak: Piz Daint
- Listing: Alpine mountains 2500-2999 m
- Coordinates: 46°35′14″N 10°20′17″E

Geography
- Location within Switzerland
- Location: Graubünden, Switzerland
- Parent range: Ortler Alps

Piz Turettas (2,963 m) is a mountain of the Swiss Ortler Alps, overlooking Fuldera in the canton of Graubünden. It lies between the Val Mora and the Val Müstair.
