= Ortler Alps =

Mountain range in Italy and Switzerland

- Italian: Alpi dell'Ortles; German: Ortler-Alpen; Romansh: Alps da l'Ortler
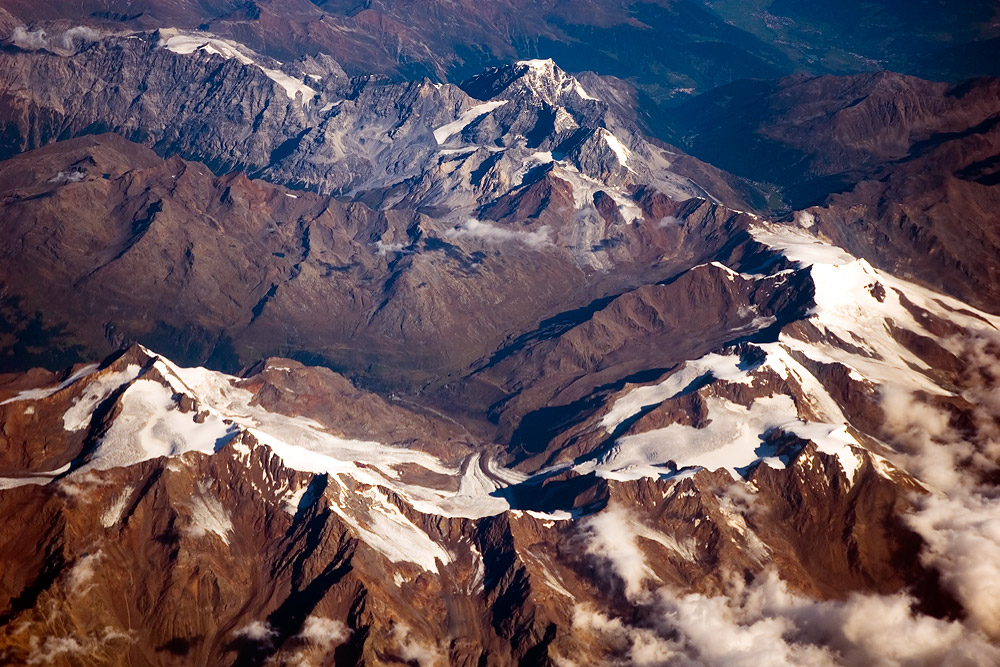
- Highest peaks of the Ortler Alps

Highest point
- Peak: Ortler
- Elevation: 3,905 m (12,812 ft)
- Coordinates: 46°30′32″N 10°32′42″E

Geography
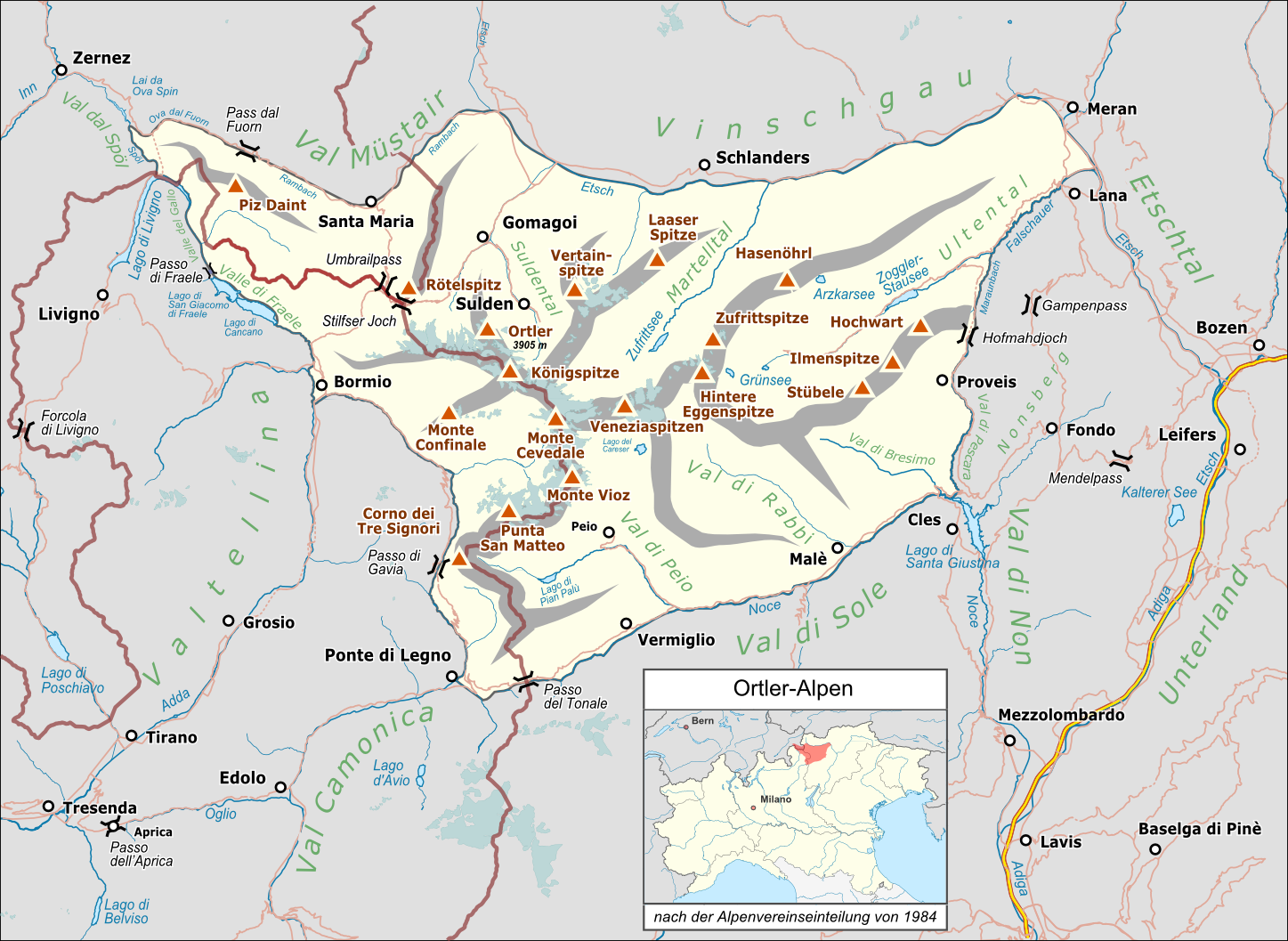
- Ortler Alps; The borders of the range according to Alpine Club classification of the Eastern Alps
- Countries: Italy; Switzerland
- Range coordinates: 46°27′N 10°37′E
- Parent range: Southern Limestone Alps
- Borders on: Sesvenna Alps; Livigno Alps; Adamello-Presanella Alps

The Ortler Alps (Italian: Alpi dell'Ortles; German: Ortler-Alpen; Romansh: Alps da l'Ortler) are a mountain range of the Southern Limestone Alps mountain group in the Central Eastern Alps, in Italy and Switzerland.

== Geography ==
The Ortler Alps are separated from:

1. the Sesvenna Alps in the north by the Ofen Pass and the Val Müstair
2. the Livigno Alps in the southwest by the Passo di Fraéle and the Adda valley (Valtellina)
3. the Adamello-Presanella Alps in the south by the Tonale Pass
4. the Ötztal Alps in the north-east by the upper Adige valley (Vinschgau).

The part west of the Gavia Pass is also called Sobretta-Gavia Group.

The Ortler Alps are drained by the rivers Adda, Oglio, Adige and its tributary Noce.

== Peaks ==
The main peaks of the Ortler Alps are:

| Peak (Italian) | (German) | (Romansh) | metres | feet |
|---|---|---|---|---|
| Ortles | Ortler | | 3,905 | 12,811 |
| Gran Zebrù | Königspitze | | 3,857 | 12,655 |
| Monte Cevedale | Zufallspitze | | 3,774 | 12,382 |
| Monte Zebrù | | | 3,735 | 12,254 |
| Palón della Mare | | | 3,705 | 12,156 |
| Punta San Matteo | | | 3,692 | 12,113 |
| Monte Vioz | | | 3,645 | 11,959 |
| Punta Thurwieser | Thurwieserspitze | | 3,641 | 11,946 |
| Pizzo Tresero | | | 3,602 | 11,818 |
| Gran Coni di Ghiaccio | Großer Eiskogel | | 3,547 | 11, 637 |
| Cima Vertana | Vertainspitze | | 3,541 | 11,618 |
| Punta dello Scudo | Schildspitze | | 3,461 | 11,355 |
| Punta delle Bàite | Tuckettspitze | | 3,458 | 11,346 |
| Cima Sternai | Hintere Eggenspitze | | 3,443 | 11,296 |
| Gioveretto | Zufrittspitze | | 3,439 | 11,283 |
| Cima Venezia | Veneziaspitze | | 3,384 | 11,103 |
| Croda di Cengles | Tschenglser Hochwand | | 3,378 | 11,083 |
| Monte Confinale | | | 3,370 | 11,057 |
| Corno dei Tre Signori | | | 3,360 | 11,024 |
| Punta Beltovo di Dentro | Hintere Schöntaufspitze | | 3,325 | 10,909 |
| Monte Sobretta | | | 3,296 | 10,814 |
| Orecchia di Lepre | Hasenöhrl | | 3,257 | 10,686 |
| Monte Gavia | | | 3,223 | 10,574 |
| Cima la Casina | | Piz Murtaröl | 3,180 | 10,430 |
| Monte Cornaccia | | Piz Tea Fondada | 3,144 | 10,315 |
| | | Piz Schumbraida | 3,125 | 10,253 |
| | | Piz Umbrail | 3,033 | 9,951 |
| Punta Rosa | Rötlspitz | Piz Cotschen | 3,026 | 9,928 |
| | Furkelsptiz | Piz Costainas | 3,004 | 9,856 |
| | Schafberg | Piz Daint | 2,968 | 9,738 |
| | | Piz Turettas | 2,963 | 9,721 |
| | | Piz Dora | 2,951 | 9,682 |
| | Schafberg | Piz Minschuns | 2,934 | 9,626 |
| Monte Forcola | | | 2,906 | 9,534 |
| | | Piz Lad | 2,882 | 9,455 |
| Cima Garibaldi | Dreisprachenspitze | Piz da las Trais Linguas | 2,843 | 9,327 |
| Monte Cavallaccio | | Piz Chavalatsch | 2,763 | 9,065 |
| Cima del Serraglio | | | 2,685 | 8,809 |
| | | Munt Buffalora | 2,630 | 8,630 |
| | | Munt la Schera | 2,587 | 8,488 |
| Monte Padrio | | | 2,153 | 7,064 |

== Mountain passes ==
The main mountain passes of the Ortler Alps are:

| Mountain pass | location | type | elevation | |
| Mountain pass | location | type | m | ft |
|---|---|---|---|---|
| Hochjoch | Sulden to the Zebrù valley | snow | 3536 | 11,602 |
| Vioz Pass | Santa Caterina Valfurva to Peio | snow | 3337 | 10,949 |
| Königsjoch | Sulden to Santa Caterina | snow | 3295 | 10,811 |
| Cevedale Pass | Santa Caterina to Martell | snow | 3271 | 10,732 |
| Eissee Pass | Sulden to Martell | snow | 3133 | 10,279 |
| Passo del Zebru | Santa Caterina to the Zebrù valley | snow | 3025 | 9925 |
| Sallentjoch | Martell to Bagni di Rabbi | snow | 3021 | 9913 |
| Sforzellina Pass | Santa Caterina to Peio | snow | 3005 | 9859 |
| Tabarettascharte | Sulden to Trafoi | footpath | 2883 | 9459 |
| Stelvio Pass/Stilfserjoch | Trafoi to Bormio | road | 2760 | 9055 |
| Gavia Pass | Santa Caterina to Ponte di Legno | road | 2637 | 8651 |
| Umbrail Pass | Val Müstair to Bormio | road | 2501 | 8205 |
| Giufplan Pass | Ofen road to Val Fraéle | footpath | 2354 | 7723 |
| Dossradond Pass | Val Müstair to Val Fraéle | footpath | 2240 | 7349 |
| Ofen Pass | Zernez to Val Müstair | road | 2149 | 7051 |
| Vigiljoch | Lana | snow | 1743 | 5718 |

== History ==
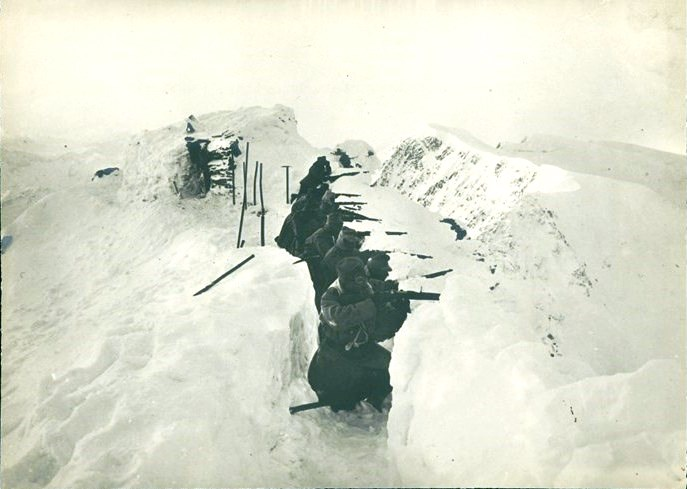
Highest trench in history near the Ortler's peak, 1917

The Ortler Alps were part of the Italian front during World War I. In this area, the Austro-Hungarians and the Italians dug in during a trench war fought at altitudes above 3,000 m (10,000 ft) for most of the war. Some trenches are still visible today, and war relics continue to be found in the area.
