= Königspitze =

Mountain in Italy

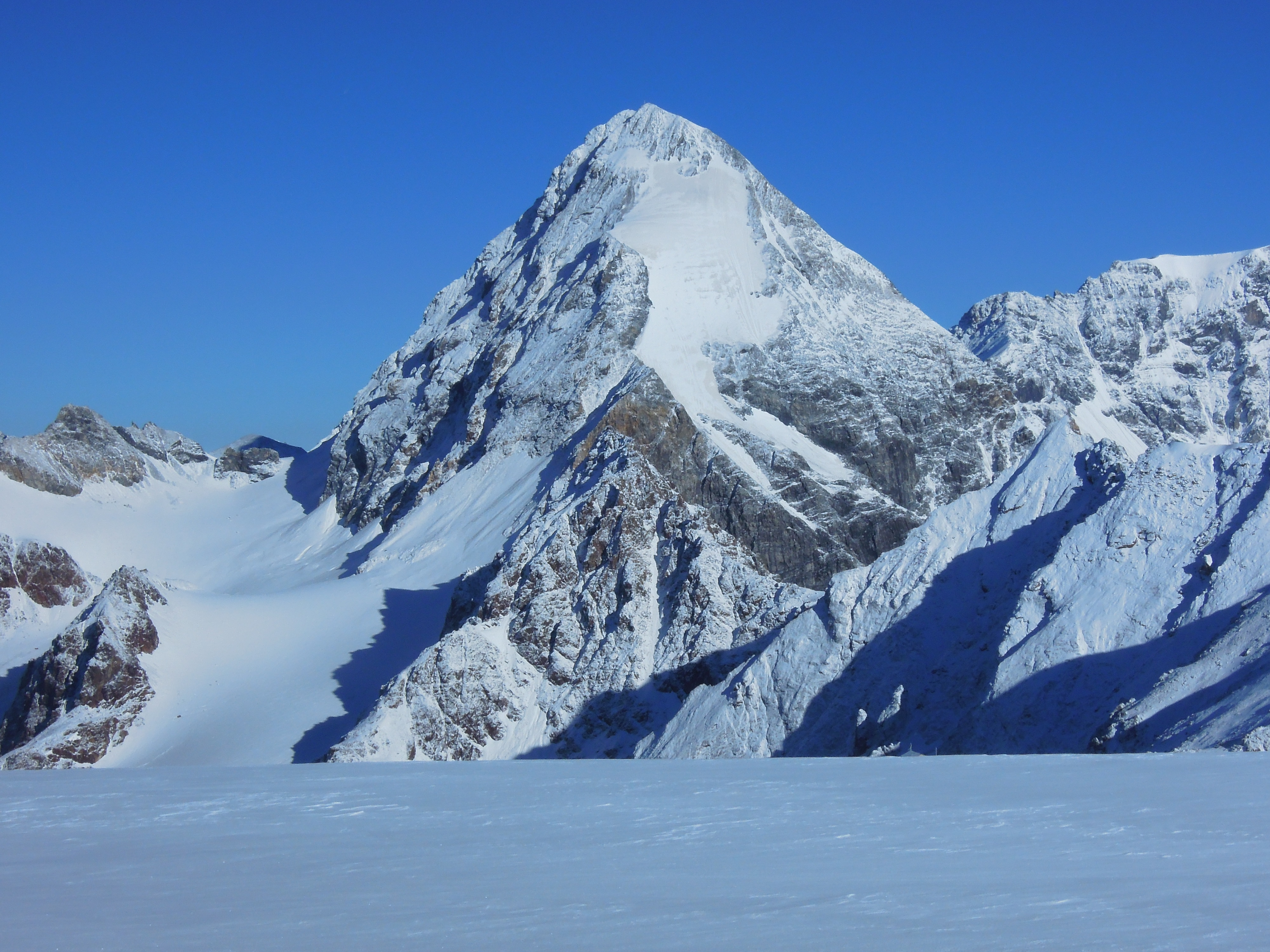

Highest point
- Elevation: 3,851 m (12,635 ft)
- Listing: Alpine mountains above 3000 m
- Coordinates: 46°28′43″N 10°34′6″E

Geography
- Location: Trentino-Alto Adige/Südtirol / Lombardy (both Italy)
- Parent range: Ortler Alps

Climbing
- First ascent: 24 August 1854 by Stephan Steinberger, or 3 August 1864 by Tuckett, Buxton and the Biner Brothers

The Königspitze (German: Königspitze; Italian: Gran Zebrù) is a mountain of the Ortler Alps on the border between South Tyrol and the Province of Sondrio (Lombardy), Italy. After the Ortler, it is the second highest peak in the Ortler Alps, at a height of 3,851m.

The mountain was first climbed on August 3, 1854. The mountain can be dangerous in warm weather, when the snow and ice can become unstable. The worst day for climbing fatalities on the mountain occurred on August 5, 1997, when seven people were killed in two separate incidents. On June 23, 2013, six were killed, also in two separate incidents. In March, 2018, three skiers died in an avalanche.

== See also ==
- List of mountains of the Alps above 3000 m
