= Piz Umbrail =

Mountain in Switzerland

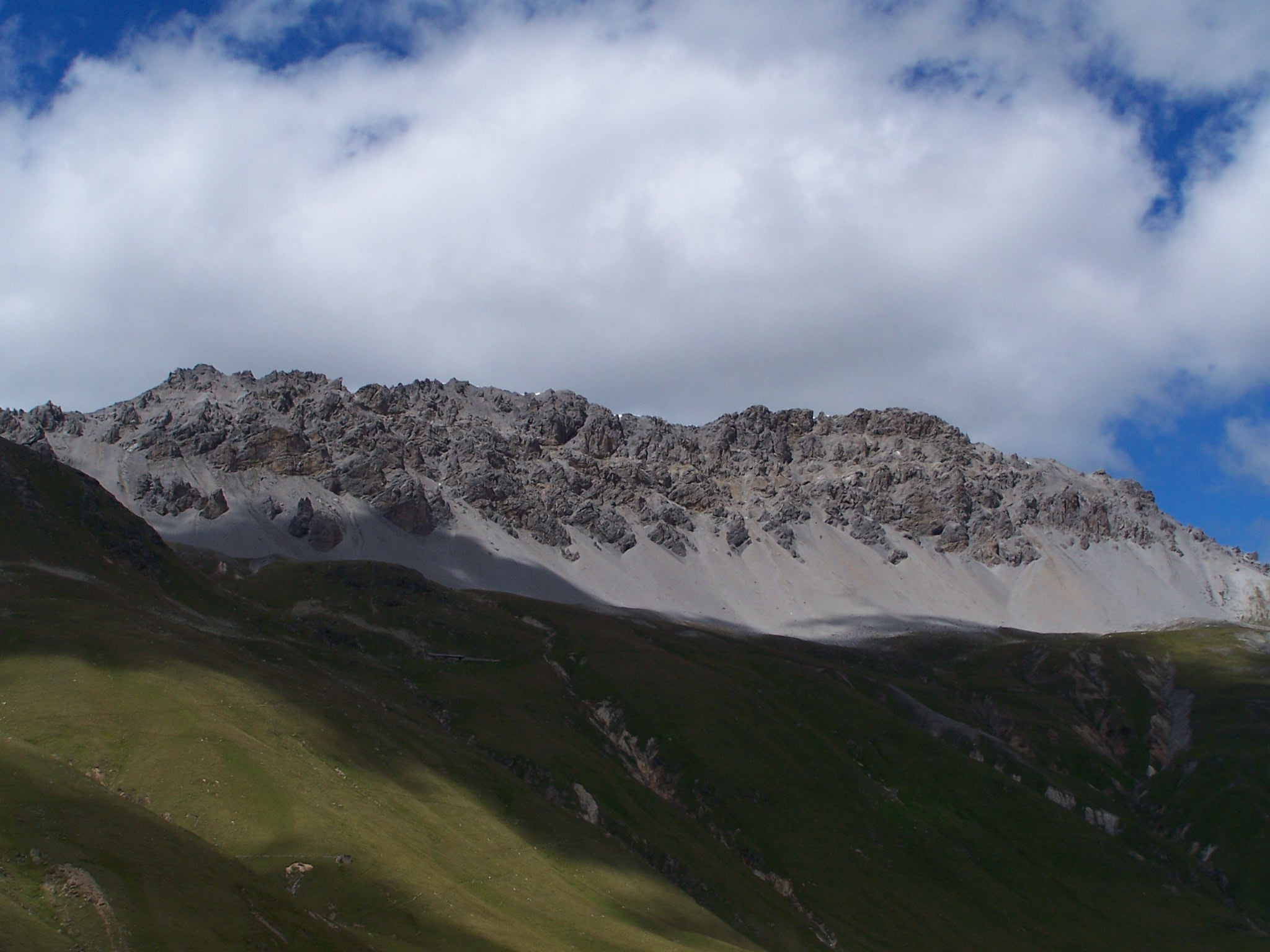
- Piz Umbrail

Highest point
- Elevation: 3,033 m (9,951 ft)
- Prominence: 294 m (965 ft)
- Parent peak: Piz Murtaröl
- Listing: Alpine mountains above 3000 m
- Coordinates: 46°33′3.3″N 10°24′56.7″E

Geography
- Location within Alps
- Location: Graubünden, Switzerland; Lombardy, Italy
- Parent range: Ortler Alps

Piz Umbrail (3,033 m) is a mountain of the Ortler Alps, south of the Umbrail Pass (2,503 m), located on the border between Lombardy (Italy) and Graubünden (Switzerland).

The mountain surface is partly of rubble and partly covered by grass, and therefore of little interest to mountaineers, but its proximity to the Umbrail Pass and accessible surface make it a popular destination for other visitors. In winter it is a relatively easy destination for ski-mountaineers.

== Normal route to the summit ==
The route starts at the Umbrail Pass, very close to the Swiss border check point. There is a lot of free parking space around, and a walk will take up to 90 minutes from there to the summit. No special equipment is needed, there are a few fixed chains along the route but those are not exposed sections, good marking all the time, and orientation is not a problem.

== Access roads ==
There are three roads to the Umbrail Pass; two from the Italian and one from the Swiss side. From Italy there is a south road from Bormio, and the road from the north-east which goes over the nearby Stelvio Pass. From the Swiss side there is a road from the Val Müstair.
