= Munt Buffalora =

Mountain in Switzerland

- Location within Switzerland

Highest point
- Elevation: 2,630 m (8,630 ft)
- Prominence: 351 m (1,152 ft)
- Parent peak: Piz Daint
- Coordinates: 46°37′37″N 10°15′01″E

Geography
- Location: Graubünden, Switzerland
- Parent range: Ortler Alps

Munt Buffalora (2,630 m) is a mountain of the Ortler Alps, located south of the Ofen Pass in the Swiss canton of Graubünden.

== Climate ==
Climate data for Buffalora, elevation 1,971 m (6,467 ft), (1991–2020)
Month	Jan	Feb	Mar	Apr	May	Jun	Jul	Aug	Sep	Oct	Nov	Dec	Year
Mean daily maximum °C (°F)	−1.9 (28.6)	−0.4 (31.3)	2.8 (37.0)	6.1 (43.0)	11.0 (51.8)	15.5 (59.9)	17.8 (64.0)	17.5 (63.5)	13.1 (55.6)	8.8 (47.8)	2.5 (36.5)	−1.7 (28.9)	7.6 (45.7)
Daily mean °C (°F)	−9.1 (15.6)	−7.9 (17.8)	−3.7 (25.3)	0.4 (32.7)	5.2 (41.4)	9.2 (48.6)	11.0 (51.8)	10.8 (51.4)	6.6 (43.9)	2.3 (36.1)	−3.4 (25.9)	−8.2 (17.2)	1.1 (34.0)
Mean daily minimum °C (°F)	−15.5 (4.1)	−15.2 (4.6)	−10.6 (12.9)	−5.9 (21.4)	−0.9 (30.4)	2.3 (36.1)	3.7 (38.7)	3.8 (38.8)	0.4 (32.7)	−3.2 (26.2)	−8.5 (16.7)	−13.9 (7.0)	−5.3 (22.5)
Average precipitation mm (inches)	43.0 (1.69)	31.3 (1.23)	44.1 (1.74)	55.9 (2.20)	84.0 (3.31)	109.5 (4.31)	118.5 (4.67)	129.8 (5.11)	85.7 (3.37)	97.5 (3.84)	85.5 (3.37)	51.3 (2.02)	936.1 (36.85)
Average snowfall cm (inches)	65.1 (25.6)	44.7 (17.6)	50.9 (20.0)	54.8 (21.6)	18 (7.1)	5.1 (2.0)	1.7 (0.7)	2.8 (1.1)	6.2 (2.4)	24.6 (9.7)	54.1 (21.3)	73.5 (28.9)	401.5 (158.1)
Average precipitation days (≥ 1.0 mm)	7.0	5.8	7.4	9.1	11.2	11.3	11.3	11.0	8.8	8.3	8.1	7.4	106.7
Average snowy days (≥ 1.0 cm)	9.1	7.2	8.2	7.8	3.0	0.6	0.2	0.3	1.0	3.1	6.8	8.5	55.8
Average relative humidity (%)	77	73	71	71	72	71	71	74	76	79	81	80	75
Source 1: NOAA
Source 2: MeteoSwiss (precipitation days and snow 1981–2020)
