= Palon de la Mare =

Mountain in Italy

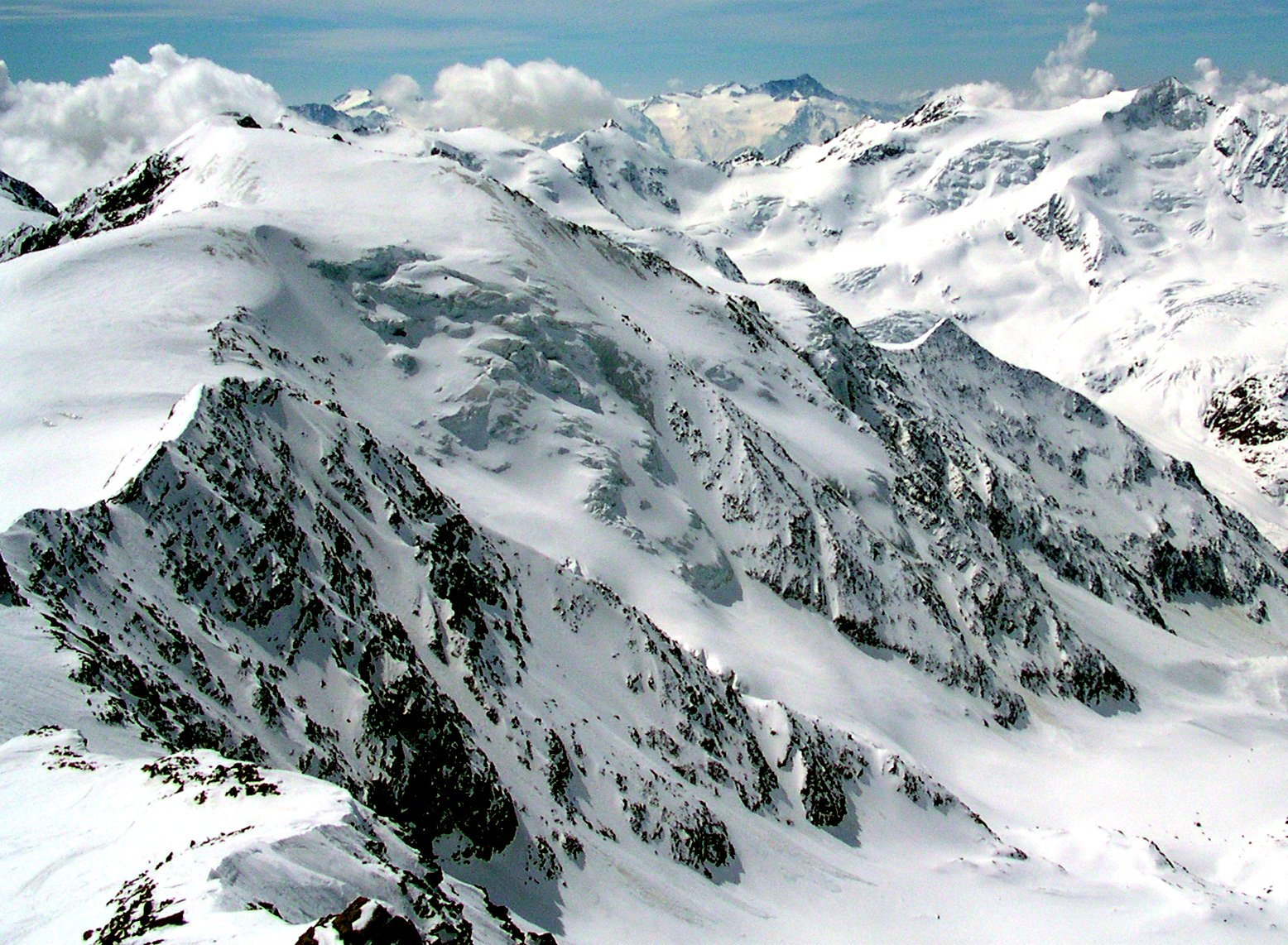

Highest point
- Elevation: 3,703 m (12,149 ft)
- Coordinates: 46°24′59″N 10°37′4″E

Geography
- Location within Alps
- Location: Lombardy, Italy
- Parent range: Ortler Alps

Palon de la Mare is a mountain of Lombardy, Italy. It has an elevation of 3,703 metres.
