= Thurwieserspitze =

Mountain in Italy

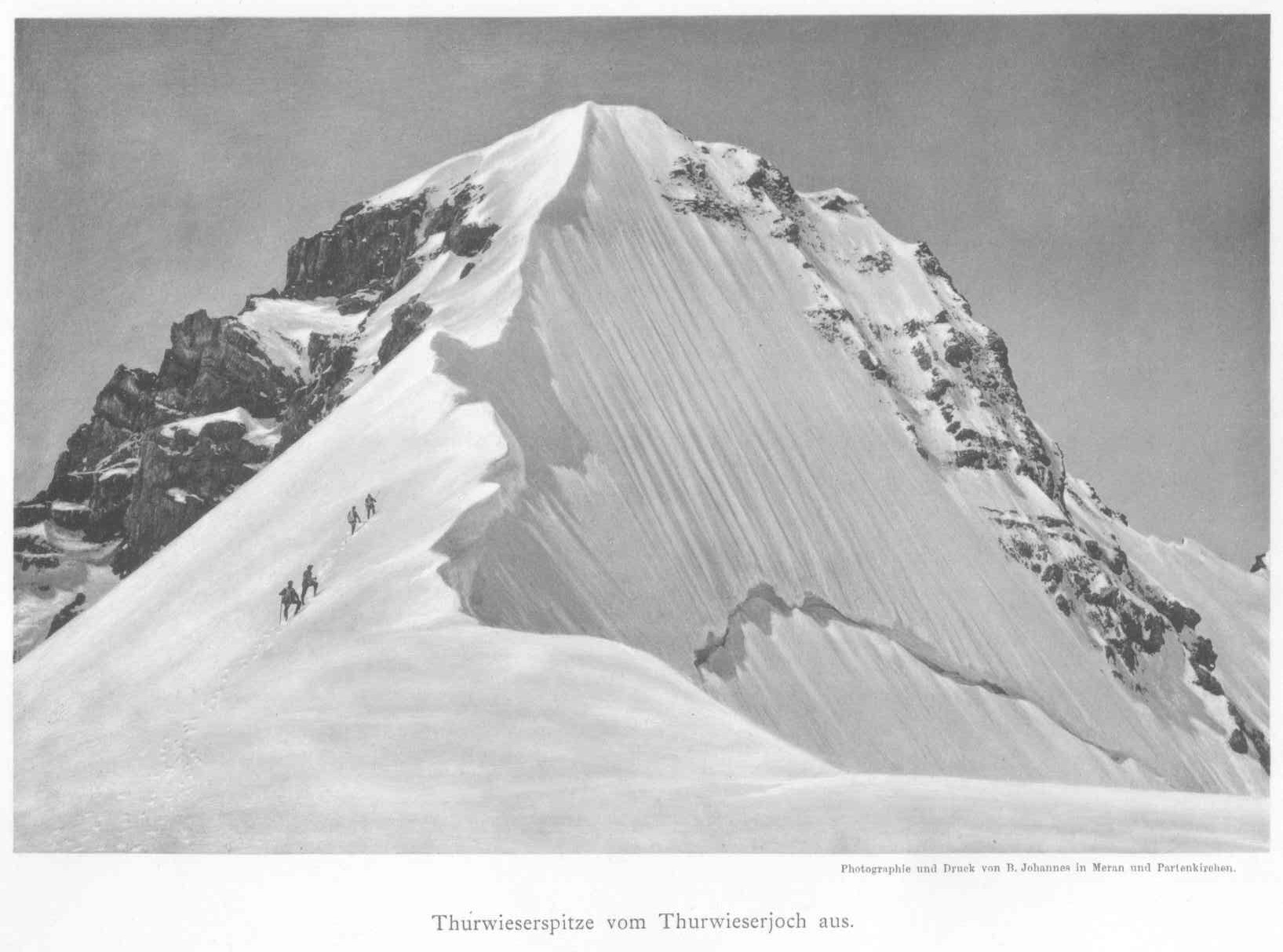
- Thurwieserspitze around 1890

Highest point
- Elevation: 3,652 m (11,982 ft)
- Prominence: 301 m (988 ft)
- Listing: Alpine mountains above 3000 m
- Coordinates: 46°29′45″N 10°31′28″E

Geography
- Location within Alps
- Location: South Tyrol / Province of Sondrio, Italy
- Parent range: Ortler Alps

Climbing
- First ascent: 20 August 1869 by Theodor Harpprecht and Josef Schnell

The Thurwieserspitze (Italian: Punta Thurwieser; German: Thurwieserspitze) is a mountain in the Ortler Alps on the border between South Tyrol and the Province of Sondrio, Italy.
