= Vertainspitze =

Mountain in Italy

- Cima Vertana
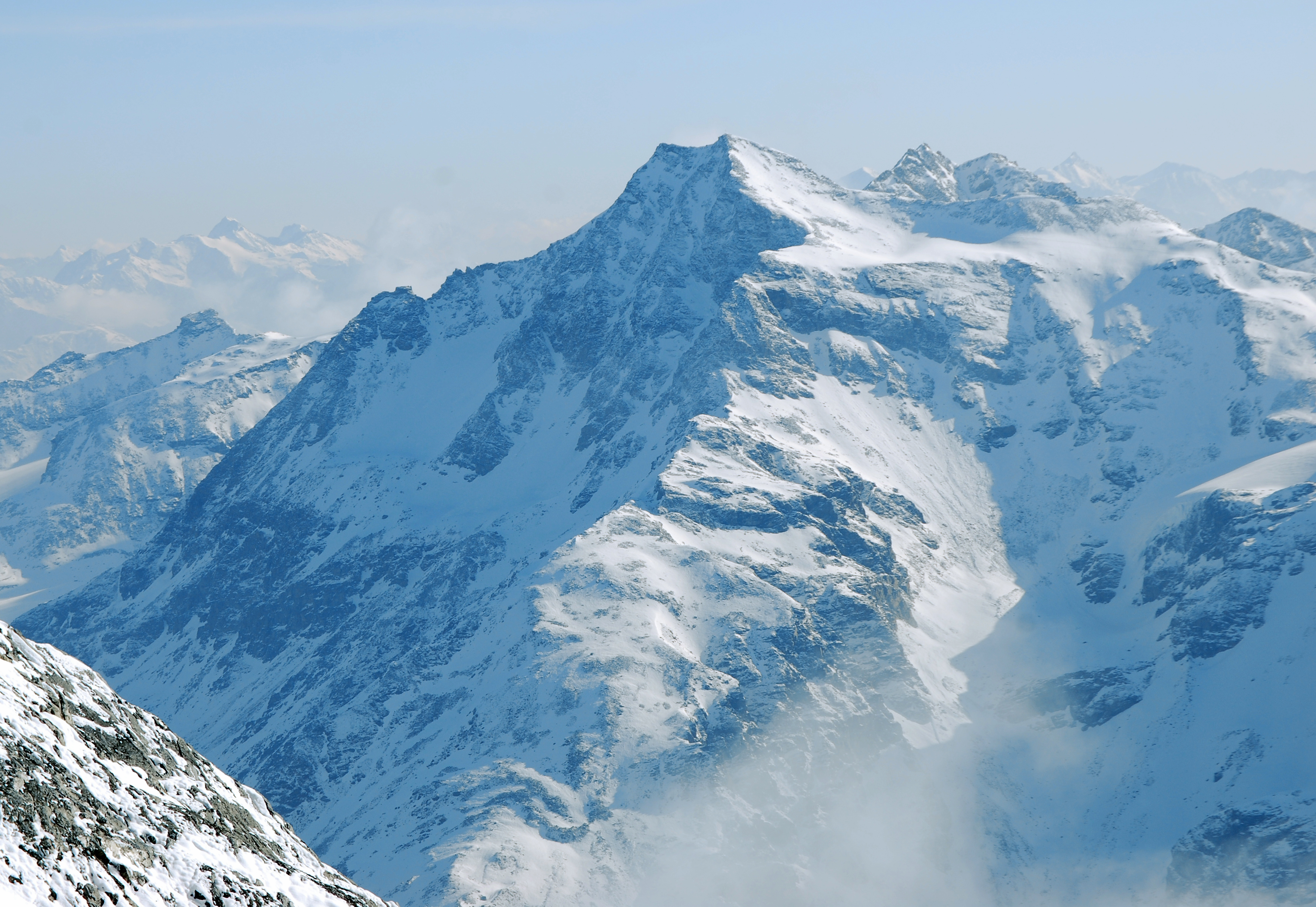

Highest point
- Elevation: 3,545 m (11,631 ft)
- Listing: Alpine mountains above 3000 m
- Coordinates: 46°32′19″N 10°38′05″E

Geography
- Location: South Tyrol, Italy
- Parent range: Ortler Alps

Climbing
- First ascent: 28 August 1865 by Julius Payer, Johann Pinggera and an unknown porter

The Vertainspitze (Italian: Cima Vertana; German: Vertainspitze) is a mountain in the Ortler Alps in South Tyrol, Italy.
