= Piz Murtaröl =

Mountain in Switzerland

- Cima la Casina
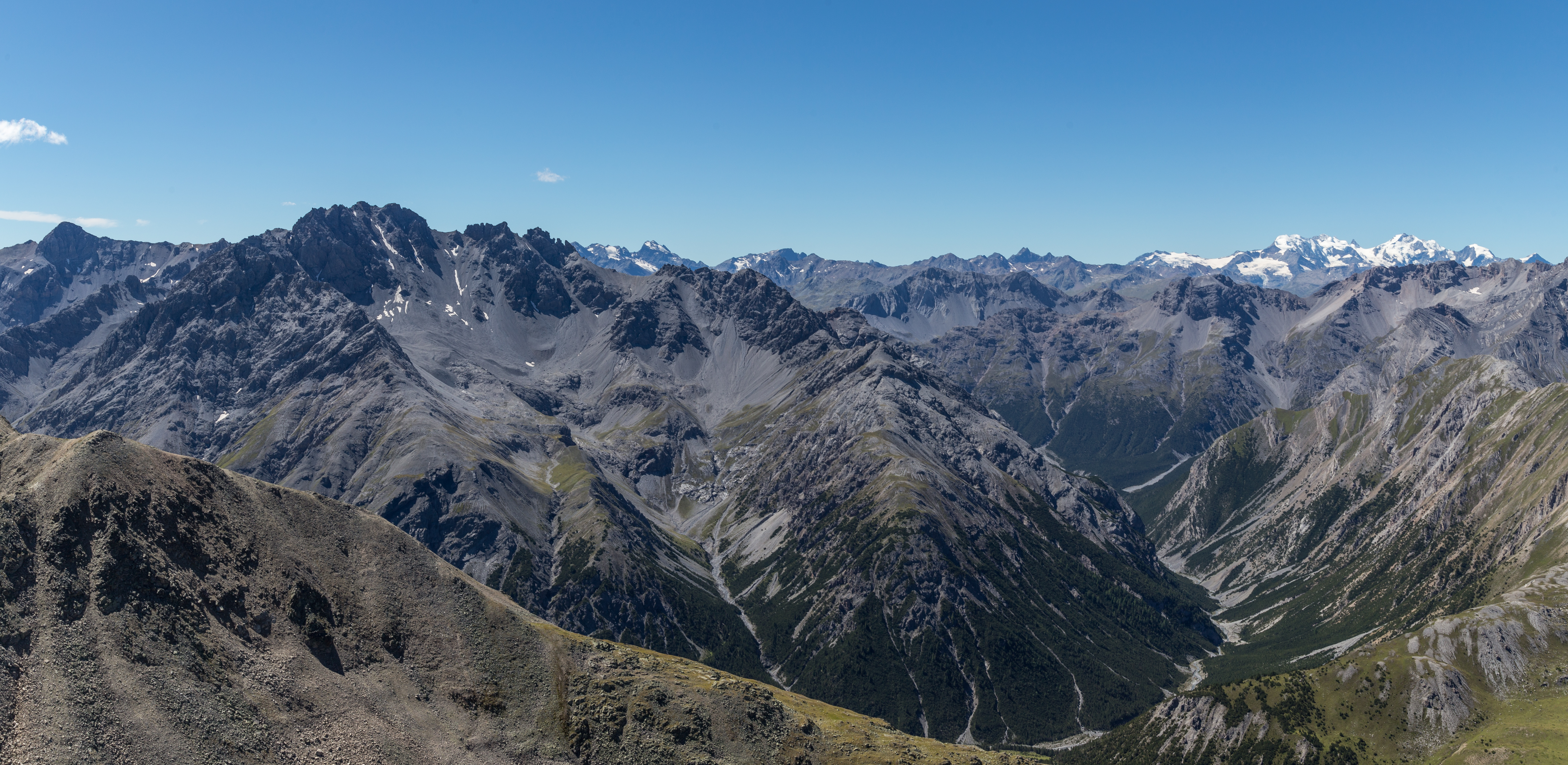
- Piz Murtaröl (left centre)

Highest point
- Elevation: 3,180 m (10,430 ft)
- Prominence: 679 m (2,228 ft)
- Parent peak: Ortler
- Isolation: 15.1 km (9.4 mi)
- Listing: Alpine mountains above 3000 m
- Coordinates: 46°34′14″N 10°17′15″E

Geography
- Location within Alps
- Location: Lombardy, Italy; Graubünden, Switzerland
- Parent range: Ortler Alps

Piz Murtaröl (Italian: Cima la Casina) is a mountain of the Ortler Alps, located on the border between Italy and Switzerland. With a height of 3,180 metres above sea level, it is the highest mountain in Val Mora. On its southern side it overlooks Passo di Fraéle.

== See also ==
- List of mountains of Graubünden
- List of most isolated mountains of Switzerland
