= Ortler =

Highest mountain of Tyrol

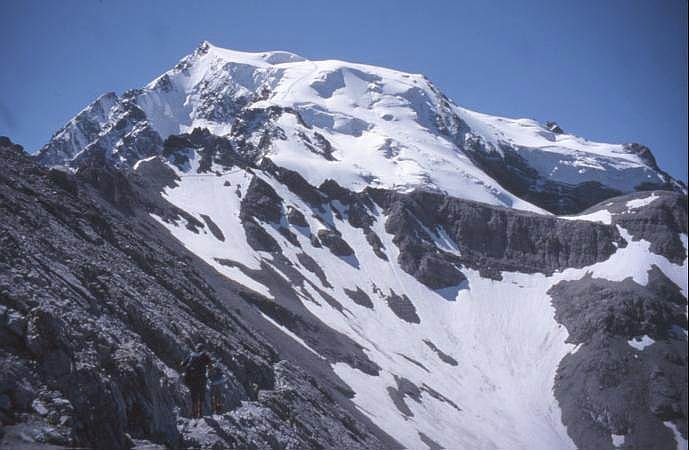
- The Ortler seen from the North ridge showing the normal route of ascent

Highest point
- Elevation: 3,905 m (12,812 ft)
- Prominence: 1,953 m (6,407 ft)
- Parent peak: Piz Bernina
- Listing: Ultra; Alpine mountains above 3000 m
- Coordinates: 46°30′32″N 10°32′42″E

Geography
- Location within Alps
- Location: South Tyrol, Italy
- Parent range: Ortler Alps

Climbing
- First ascent: 27 September 1804
- Easiest route: North ridge from the Payer house

Ortler (Austrian German: [ˈɔrtlɐ]; Italian: Ortles [ˈɔrtles]) is, at 3,905 m (12,812 ft) above sea level, the highest mountain in the Eastern Alps outside the Bernina Range. It is the main peak of the Ortler Range. It is the highest point of the Southern Limestone Alps, of South Tyrol in Italy, of Tyrol overall, and, until 1919, of the Austro-Hungarian Empire. In German the mountain is commonly referred to as "König Ortler" (King Ortler), like in the unofficial hymn of South Tyrol, the Bozner Bergsteigerlied.

== Geography ==
The massive mountain is capped by a glacier on the northwest flank and has a long north ridge that ends at the village of Gomagoi and separates the valleys of Trafoi and Sulden. The South ridge leads to the Hochjoch (3527 m) on the main ridge of the Ortler Alps that forms the border of the Province of Sondrio and South Tyrol. Going west on this main ridge are the Thurwieserspitze (3652) and Trafoier Wall (3565 m), while to the Southeast are the Monte Zebrù (3740 m) and the majestic Königspitze (3859 m). From nearby mountains in the northeast the impressive lineup of Königspitze, Zebru and Ortler is known as “das Dreigestirn” (the three heavenly bodies).

== First ascent ==
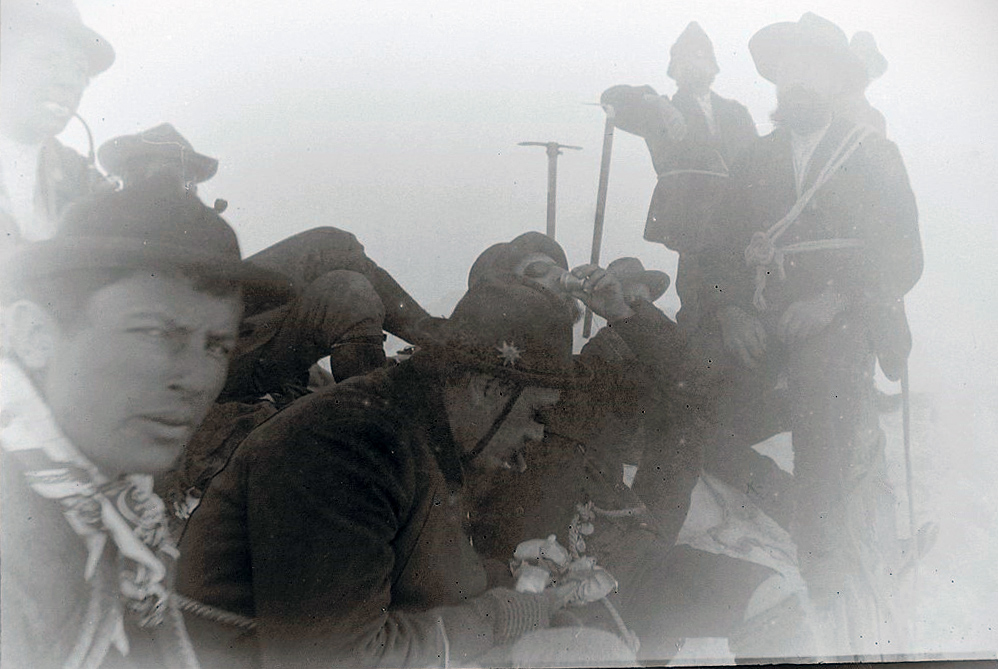
Austrian mountaineers at Ortler peak in 1891

The Ortler was first climbed by Josef Pichler ("Pseirer-Josele"), a chamois hunter from St. Leonhard in Passeier, and his companions Johann Leitner and Johann Klausner from Zell am Ziller on 27 September 1804. The ascent had been a request of Archduke Johann of Austria, who felt strongly that after the first ascent of the Großglockner (3,798 m) in 1800, the highest mountain in his brother's empire ought to be climbed. The archduke ordered Johannes Nepomuk Gebhard, a "mountain official" and topographer from Salzburg, to climb the mountain with locals. The first five attempts failed and Gebhard was ready to give up, when Pichler responded to the prize money offered for reaching the peak. Pichler and his friends took a difficult, and because of avalanche danger until recently disused, route over the northwest face from Trafoi. (The route was re-opened in 2004.)

Upon their return, the men were not believed on their words alone. Gebhard sent Pichler onto the mountain twice more, first in August 1805 with a flag that could be observed with a telescope from the valley, and again in September 1805 with a huge torch. Only after the torch had been seen burning at night was the accomplishment acknowledged. The route Pichler and his men (two brothers named Hell and an unnamed hunter from Langtaufers) took in 1805 was the currently still popular East ridge ("Hintergrat", literally "back-ridge") route. In 1834, at the age of 70, Pichler would make his fifth and final ascent, guiding Professor Karl Thurwieser to the top.

== Notable other ascents and descents ==
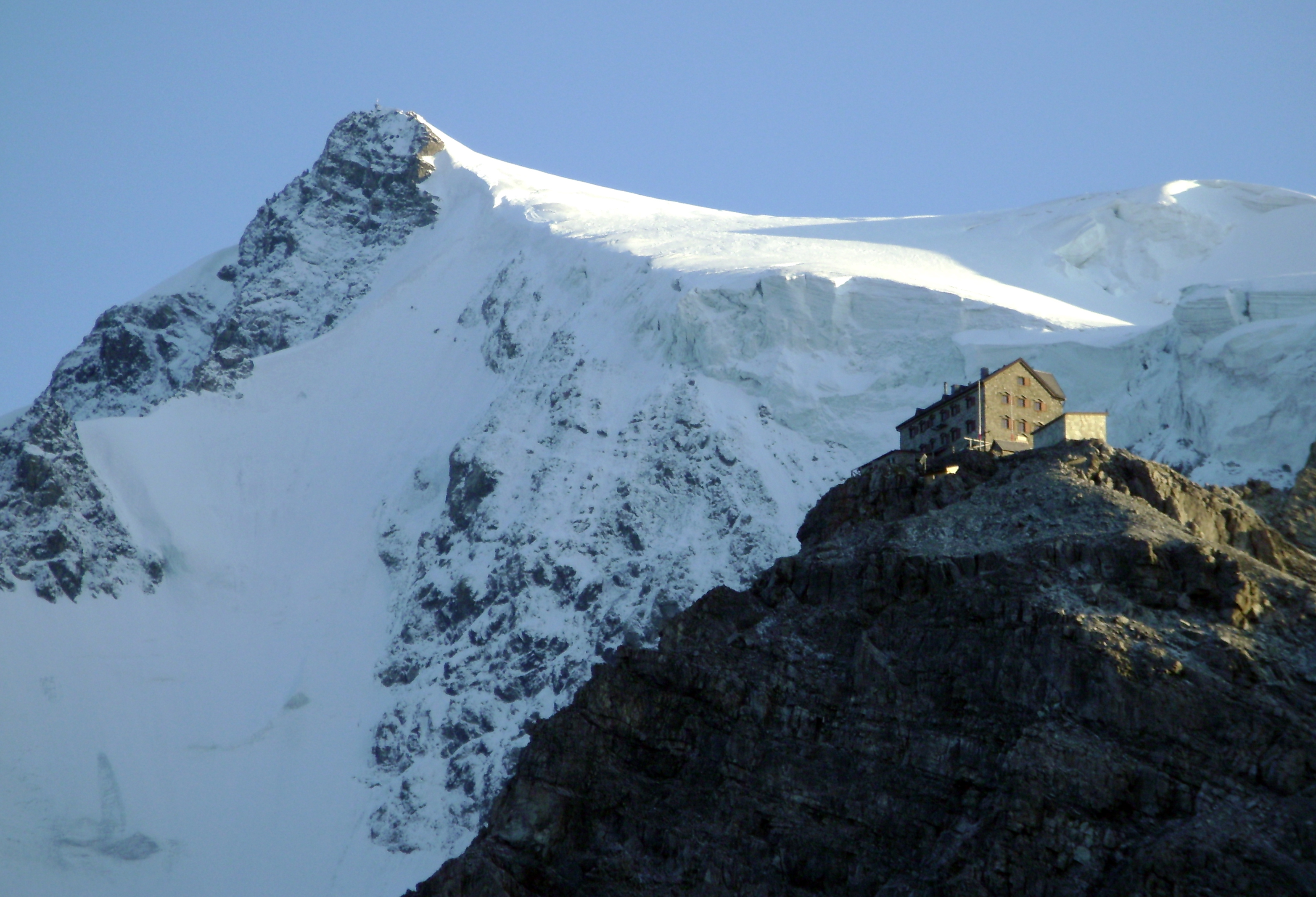
Payer house on the North ridge

The first time the Ortler was climbed via the easiest and currently normal route, the North ("Tabaretta") ridge, was more recently, in July 1865, as the approach is rather lengthy. In 1875 a hut was erected 3,029m high on the North ridge, to break up the climb in two steps. It was named the Payer house, after Julius von Payer, who had mapped the Ortler Alps between 1865 and 1868 and had climbed 50 of its peaks with Johann Pinggera as his guide.

The first ascent of the South ridge from the Hochjoch followed in 1875, two couloirs on the East face (the Minnigerode and Schück couloir) were opened in 1878-79 and the two steep Northeast ridges (Marlet and Rothböck ridge) were conquered in 1889 and 1909, respectively. Members of the Pinggera family were involved in most of these ascents.

The 1,200 m high ice route on the Ortler north face, longest in the Eastern Alps, was first climbed in June 1931 by Hans Ertl and Franz Schmid and the remote Southwest face in 1934. The North face was soloed first in 1963 by Dieter Drescher who had also added some first winter ascents to his name, including a traverse of Königspitze, Monte Zebrù, and Ortler in February 1975. On August 31, 1981, Reinhard Patscheider achieved the amazing feat of climbing the north faces of Königspitze, Zebrù and Ortler all in one day.

Extreme skiing started early in the Ortler mountains, with Heini Holzer descending the Schück couloir in 1971 and the Minnigerode couloir in 1975. On June 24, 1983, Andreas Orgler skied down the North face.

== First World War ==
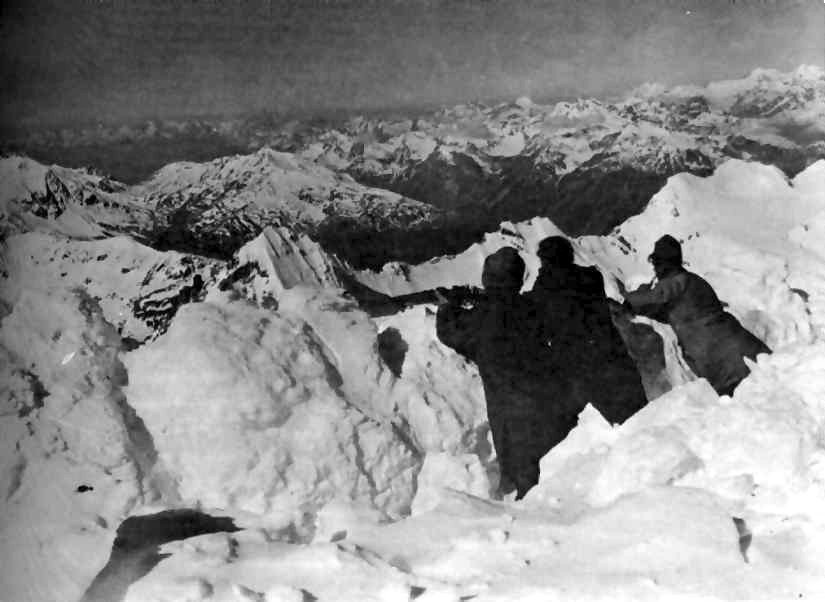
Highest trench in history near the Ortler's peak, 1917

The Ortler Alps were one of the main battlegrounds between Austro-Hungarian and Italian troops in the First World War, being on the border of Italy and Austria-Hungary. The advantage of owning the highest point was very important. The Austro-Hungarian troops had quickly occupied the highest peaks, and the Italian troops' main goal, for four years, was to dislodge them from the positions. In the mid-1990s, a mountain guide discovered two guns that had been stationed very near the top of the Ortler but had been hidden by snow ever since. The discovery was kept secret until the 200th anniversary of the first ascent in 2004. The guns are now on display in a museum in Trafoi.

== Gallery ==
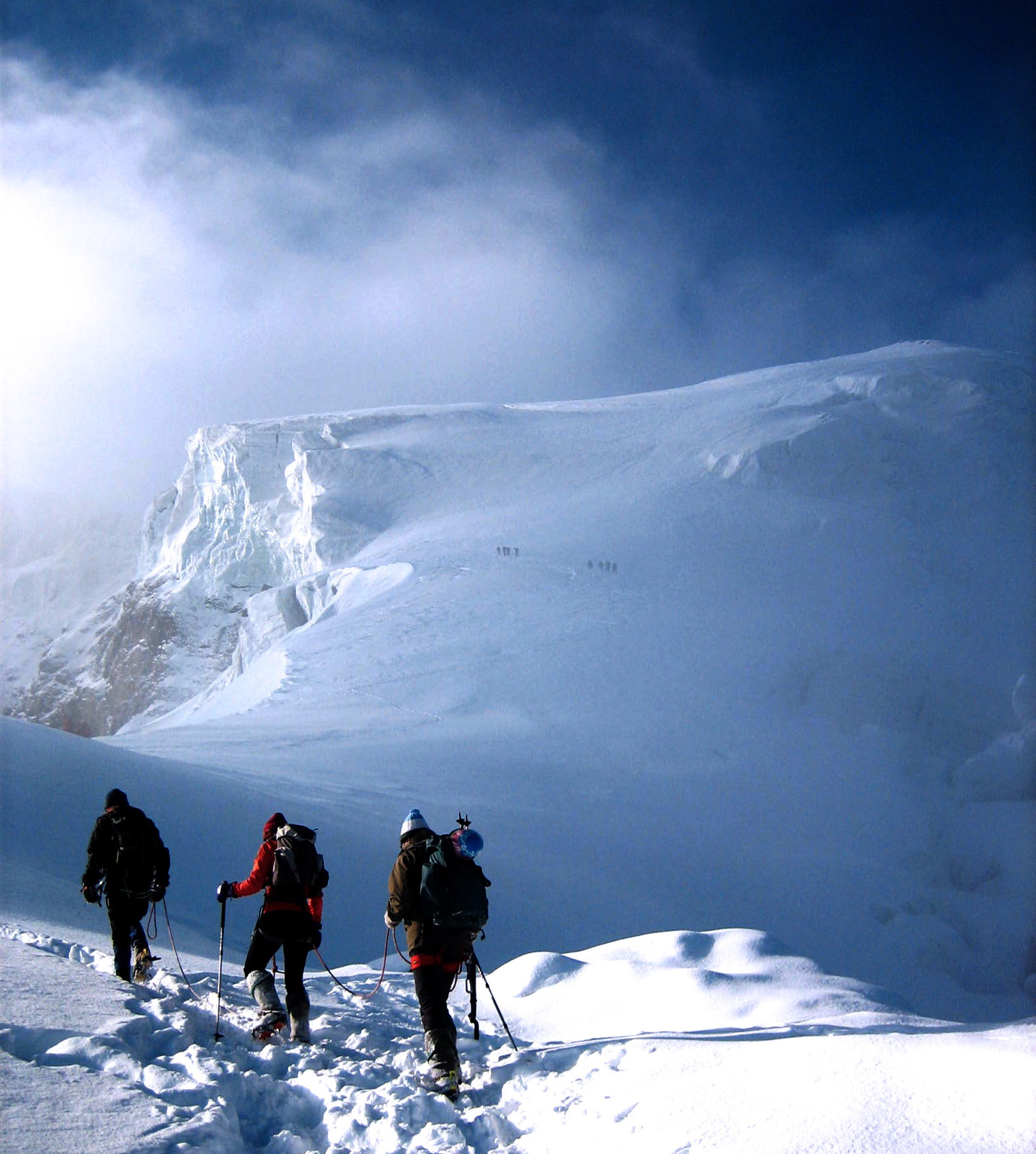
Ortler ascent

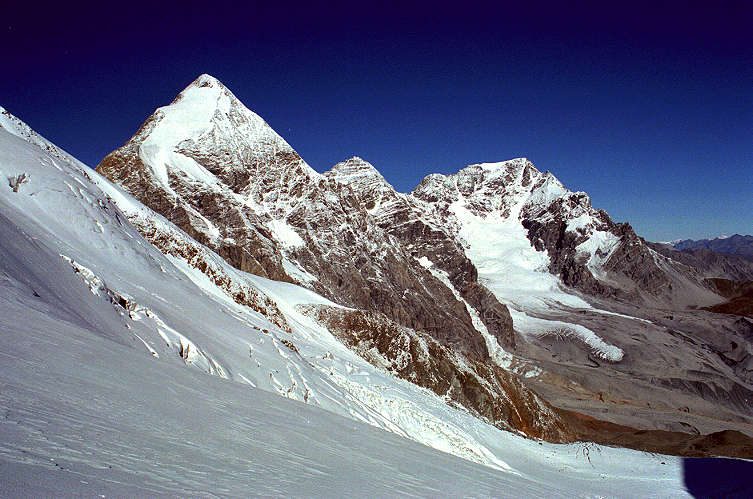
Königspitze, Zebrù and Ortler from the south-east

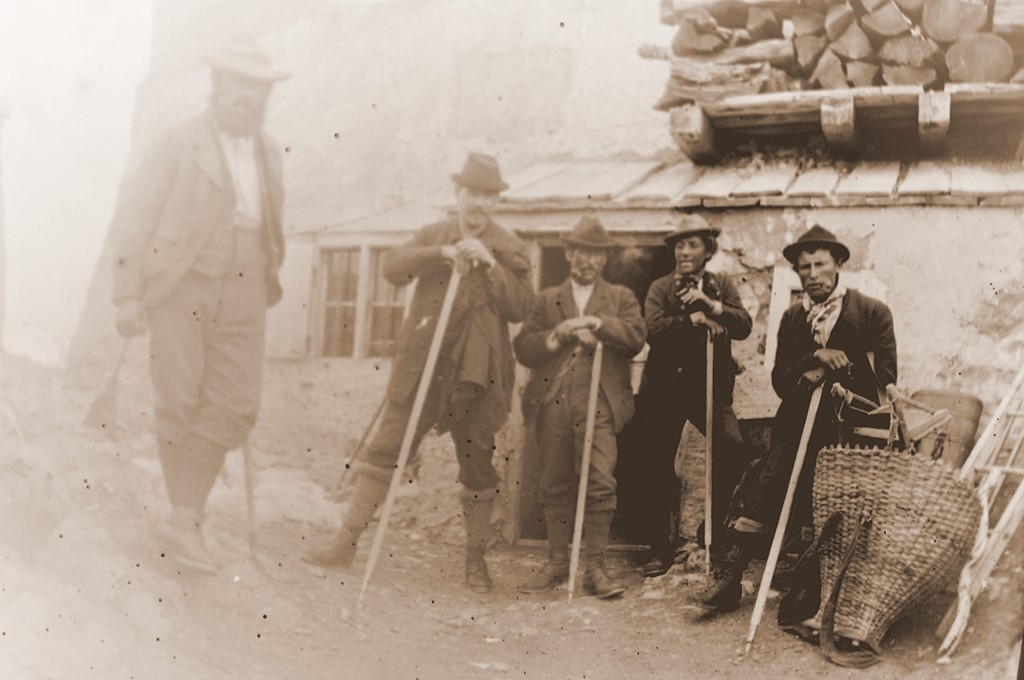
Mountaineers from Vienna at the Payer house on their way to climb the Ortler in July 1891.

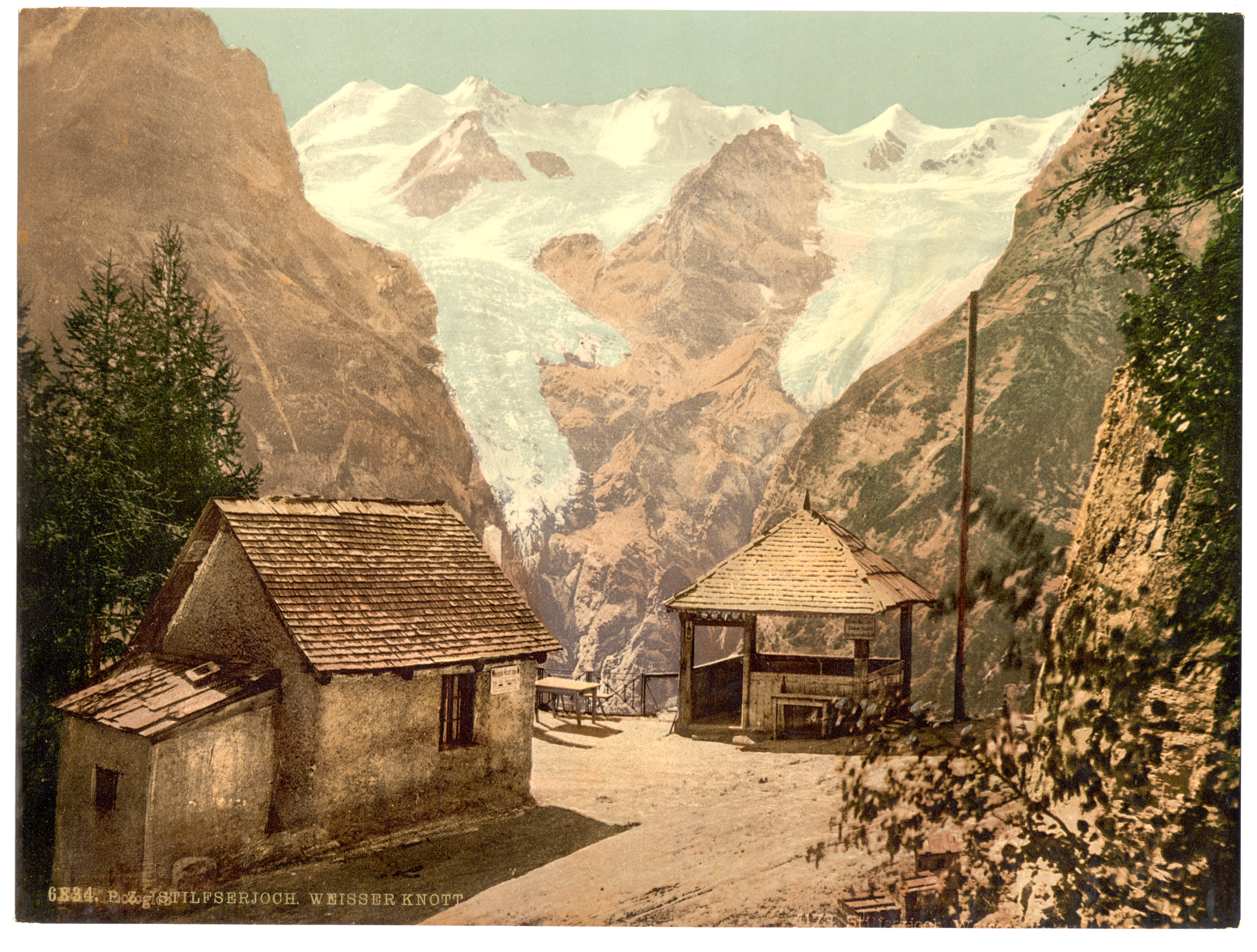
Ortler glacier as seen from the Stelvio Pass to the west. Photo about 1900.

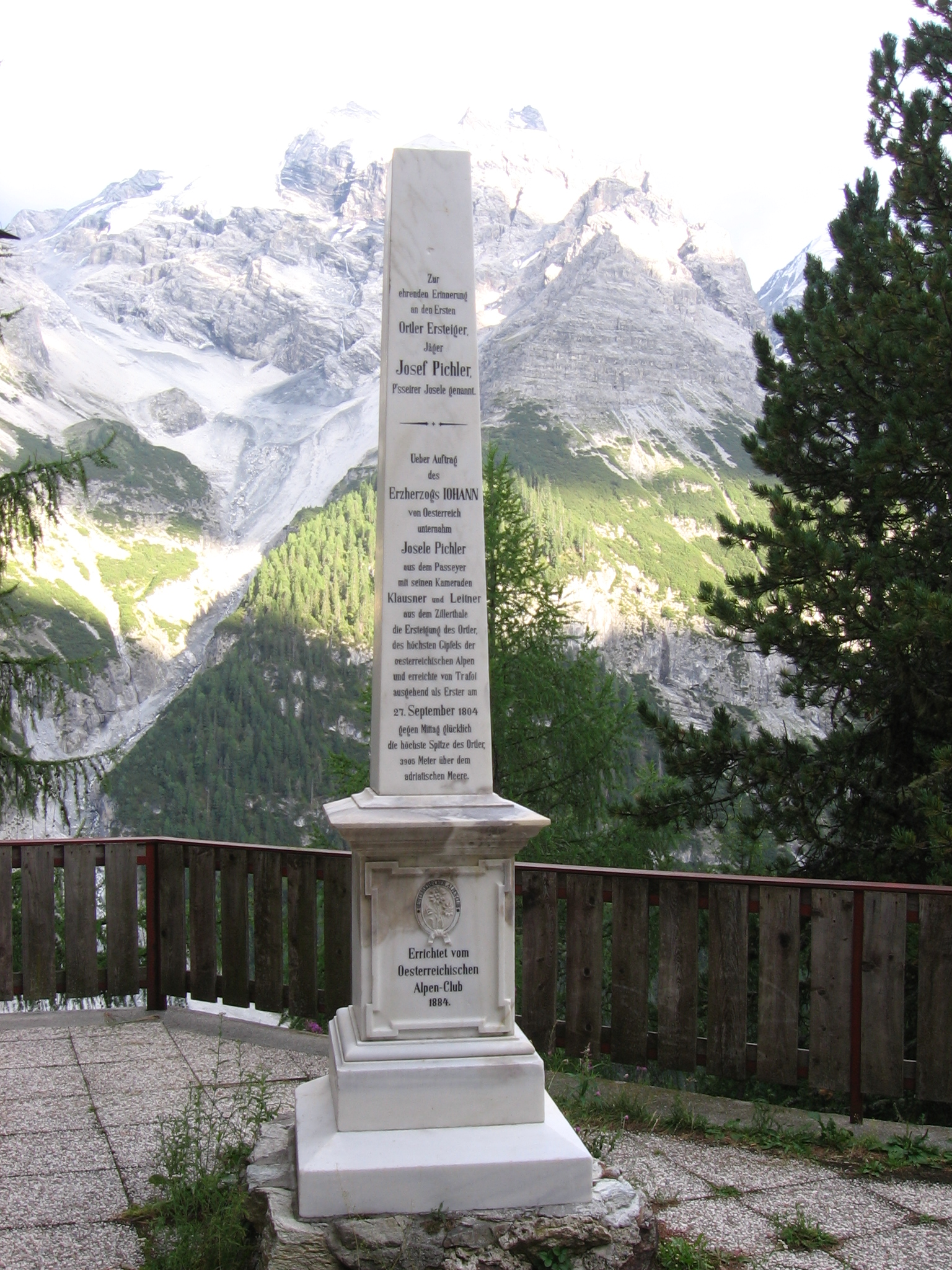
Obelisk at the Forte Weisser Knott on the Swiss-Italian border, with inscription describing the first ascent of the Ortler by Josef Pichler.

== See also ==
- List of Italian regions by highest point
- List of mountains of the Alps above 3000 m

== Sources and external links ==
- Sabine Holzknecht, Sulden und der Ortler, "Alpin" June 2004 (German article at the occasion of the 200-year anniversary of the first ascent) (in German)
- German article on the first ascent (in Austrian German)
- First World War pictures of the Ortler frontline
- View from the Ortler to the southeast
- Panoramic view from the northwest of the Ortler in winter
- Coolidge, William Augustus Brevoort (1911). "Ortler" . Encyclopædia Britannica. Vol. 20 (11th ed.). p. 341.
- "Ortler" . New International Encyclopedia. 1905.
