= Umbrail Pass =

Mountain pass on the Swiss-Italian border

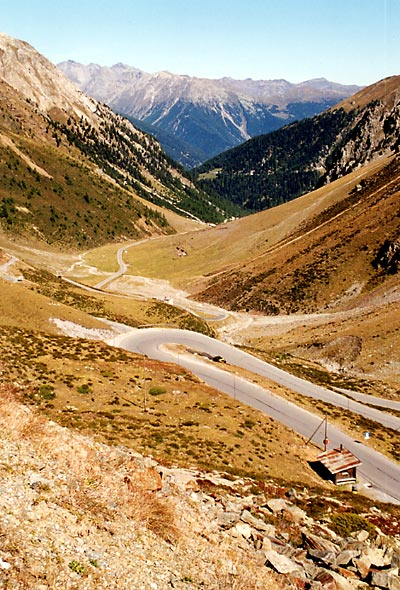
- Umbrail pass through Val Müstair

- Location within Alps
- Elevation: 2,501 metres (8,205 ft)
- Traversed by: road

Third Approach
- Location: Italy–Switzerland border
- Range: Alps
- Coordinates: 46°32′35″N 10°26′02″E

Umbrail Pass (German: Umbrailpass or Wormserjoch, Italian: Giogo di Santa Maria) is a high mountain pass on the Italy–Switzerland border, connecting Santa Maria in Val Müstair with Bormio in the Adda valley. On the Italian side, it connects to the Stelvio Pass road and the Valtellina. It is currently the highest paved road in Switzerland.

The sign at the top of the pass gives its elevation as 2,503 metres (8,212 ft) above sea level, but the reference level for Swiss elevation measurements has changed since the sign was erected, leaving 2,501 metres (8,205 ft) as the correct value according to current elevation.

The pass is named after the "Piz Umbrail", a nearby mountain peak.

== History ==
The pass, which in medieval times was the primary route through the region, was initially known as the Stelvio Pass, Juga Rætica, or mons Braulius (after Braulio of Zaragoza). It was formerly used to connect Tyrol with Lake Como, which allowed a link between the Habsburg domains in the County of Tyrol and those in the Duchy of Milan; this role was superseded by the modern Stelvio Pass which opened in 1820. In 1901, the modern road was built, and automobile transit began in 1925.

The road has been entirely asphalted since 2015. The last unpaved section was a 1.5 km stretch on the Swiss side, running between elevations of 1,883 and 2,012 metres (6,178 and 6,601 ft). During the 2017 Giro d'Italia, Umbrail Pass was reached during the stage from Rovetta to Bormio.

== See also ==
- List of highest paved roads in Europe
- Principal passes of the Alps
