= Eastern Rhaetian Alps =

Mountain range

- Italian: Alpi Retiche orientali German: Östliche Rätische Alpen
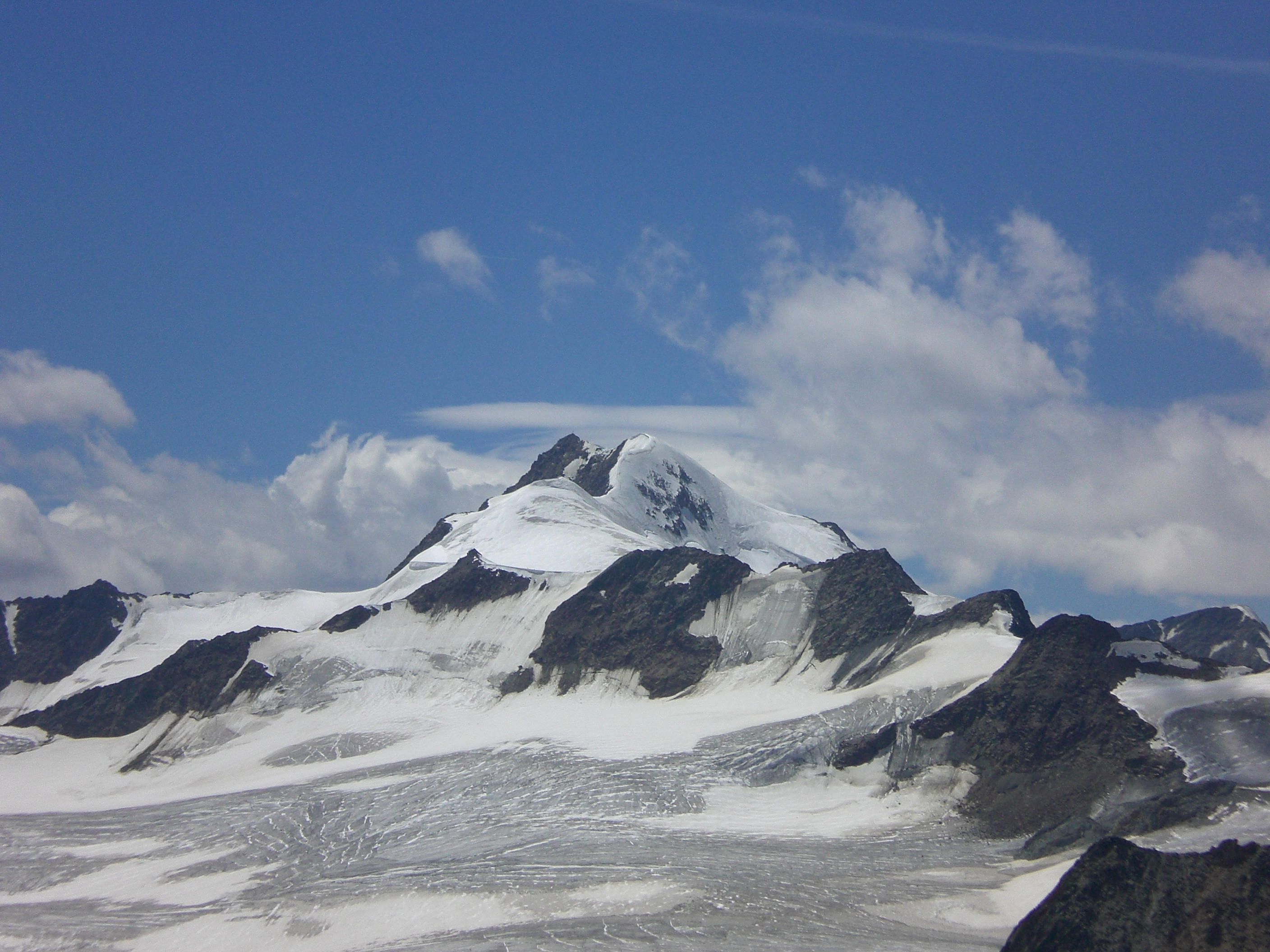
- The Wildspitze, the highest mountain of the range

Highest point
- Peak: Wildspitze
- Elevation: 3,774 m (12,382 ft)
- Coordinates: 46°53′07″N 10°52′02″E

Geography
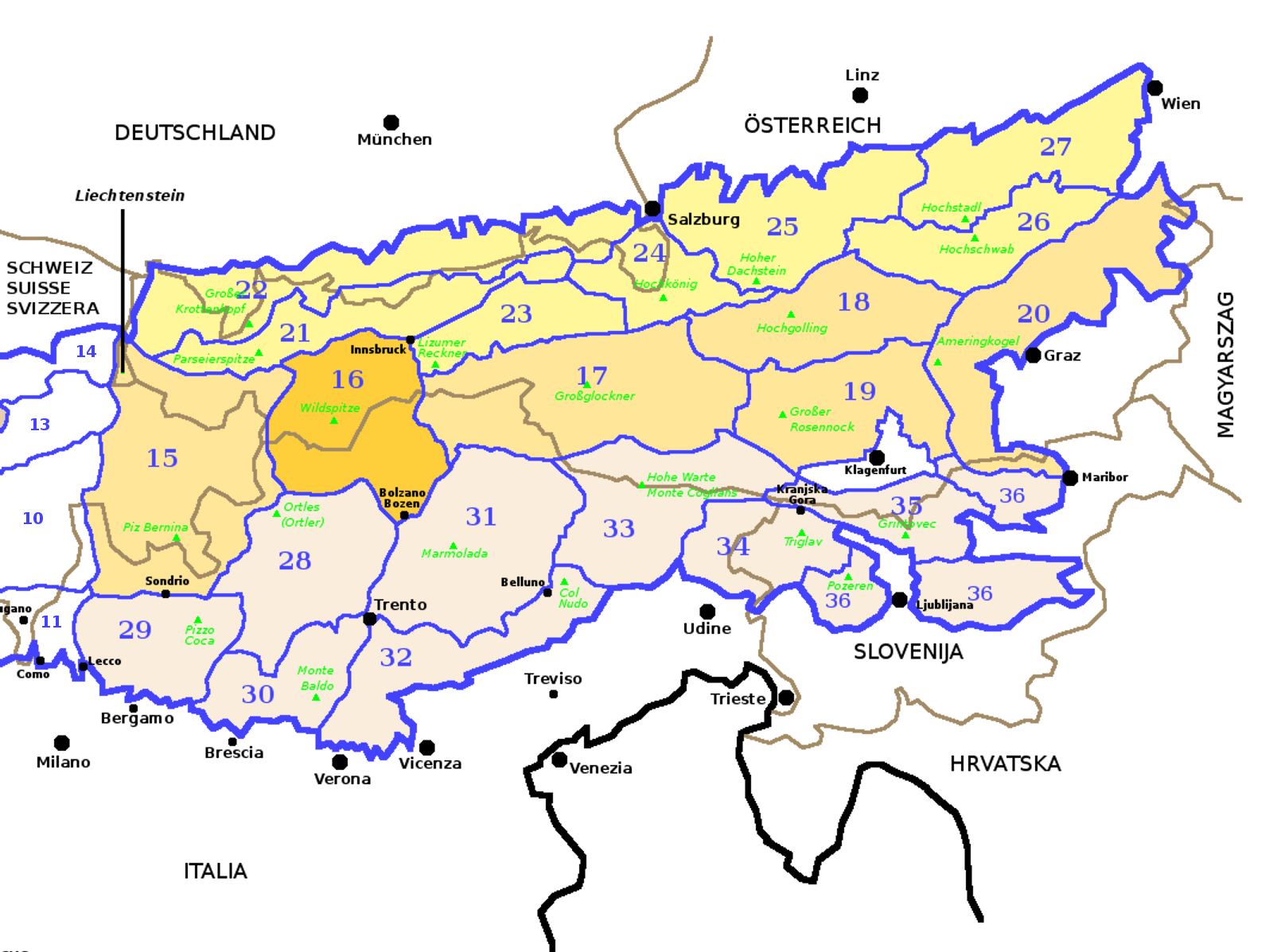
- Eastern Rhaetian Alps (section nr.16) within Eastern Alps
- Countries: Austria and Italy
- Region, Land: Trentino-Alto Adige and Tyrol
- Parent range: Central Eastern Alps
- Borders on: Western Rhaetian Alps, North Tyrol Limestone Alps, Tyrol Schistose Alps, Western Tauern Alps, Dolomites and Southern Rhaetian Alps

Geology
- Orogeny: Alpine orogeny

The Eastern Rhaetian Alps (Östliche Rätische Alpen in German, Alpi Retiche orientali in Italian) are a mountain range in the central part of the Alps.

== Geography ==
Administratively the range belongs to the Italian region of Trentino-Alto Adige and the Austrian state of Tyrol.

=== SOIUSA classification ===
According to SOIUSA (International Standardized Mountain Subdivision of the Alps) the mountain range is an Alpine section, classified in the following way:

- main part = Eastern Alps
- major sector = Central Eastern Alps
- section = Eastern Rhaetian Alps
- code = II/A-16

=== Subdivision ===
The range is subdivided into three subsections:

- Ötztal Alps (DE: Ötztaler Alpen, IT: Alpi Venoste) - SOIUSA code: II/A-16.I,
- Stubai Alps (DE: Stubaier Alpen, IT: Alpi dello Stubai) - SOIUSA code: II/A-16.II,
- Sarntal Alps (DE: Sarntaler Alpen, IT: Alpi Sarentine) - SOIUSA code: II/A-16.III.

== Notable summits ==
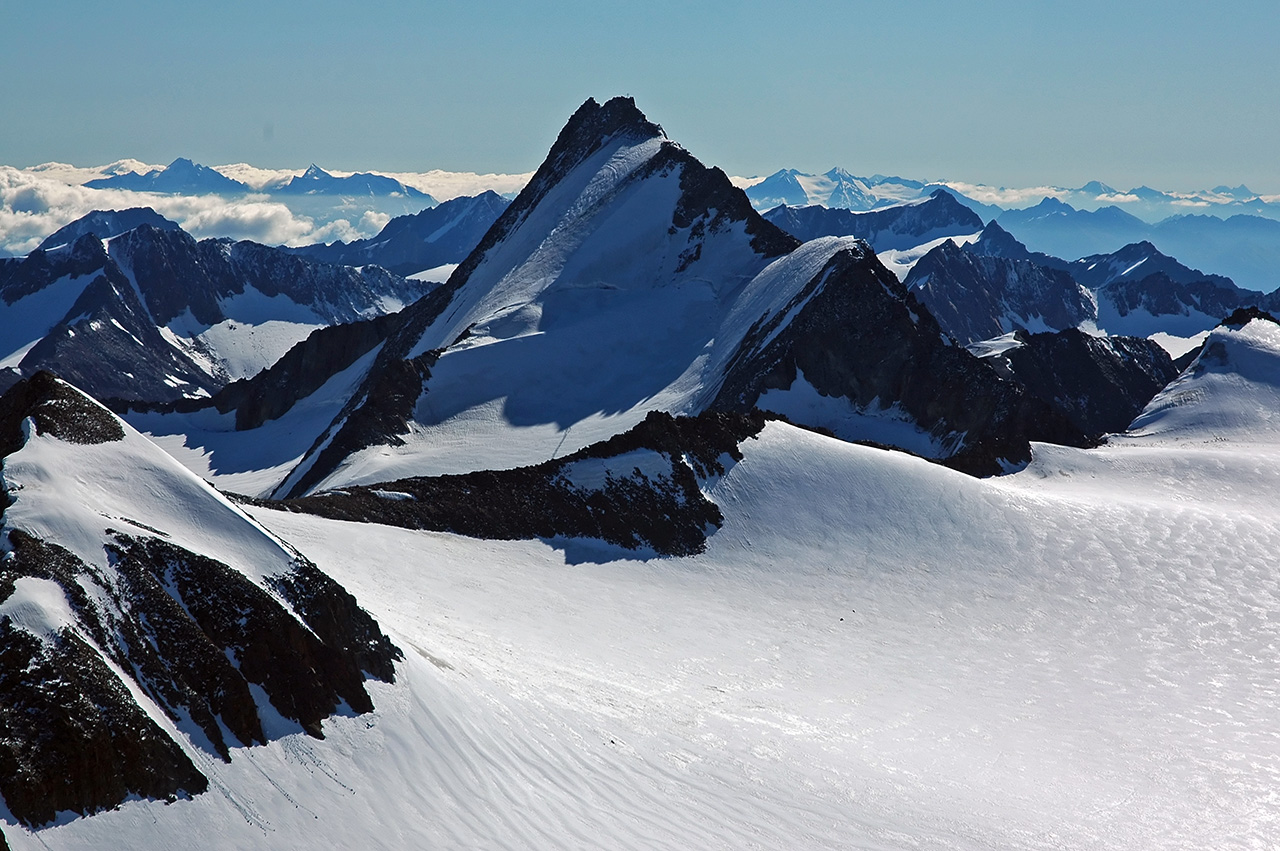
Hintere Schwärze, in the Ötztal Alps

Some notable summits of the Eastern Rhaetian Alps are:

Name	elevation (m)	subsection
Wildspitze	3,772	Ötztal Alps
Palla Bianca	3,738	Ötztal Alps
Hintere Schwärze	3,628	Ötztal Alps
Similaun	3,607	Ötztal Alps
Weißseespitze	3,518	Ötztal Alps
Fineilspitze	3,514	Ötztal Alps
Zuckerhütl	3,507	Stubai Alps
Hochwilde	3,479	Ötztal Alps
Hinterer Seelenkogel	3,470	Ötztal Alps
Wilder Freiger	3,418	Stubai Alps
Roteck	3,337	Ötztal Alps
Texelspitze	3,318	Ötztal Alps
Hohe Weisse	3,281	Ötztal Alps
Habicht	3,277	Stubai Alps
Hirzer	2,781	Sarntal Alps
Jakobsspitze	2,741	Sarntal Alps

== Notable passes ==
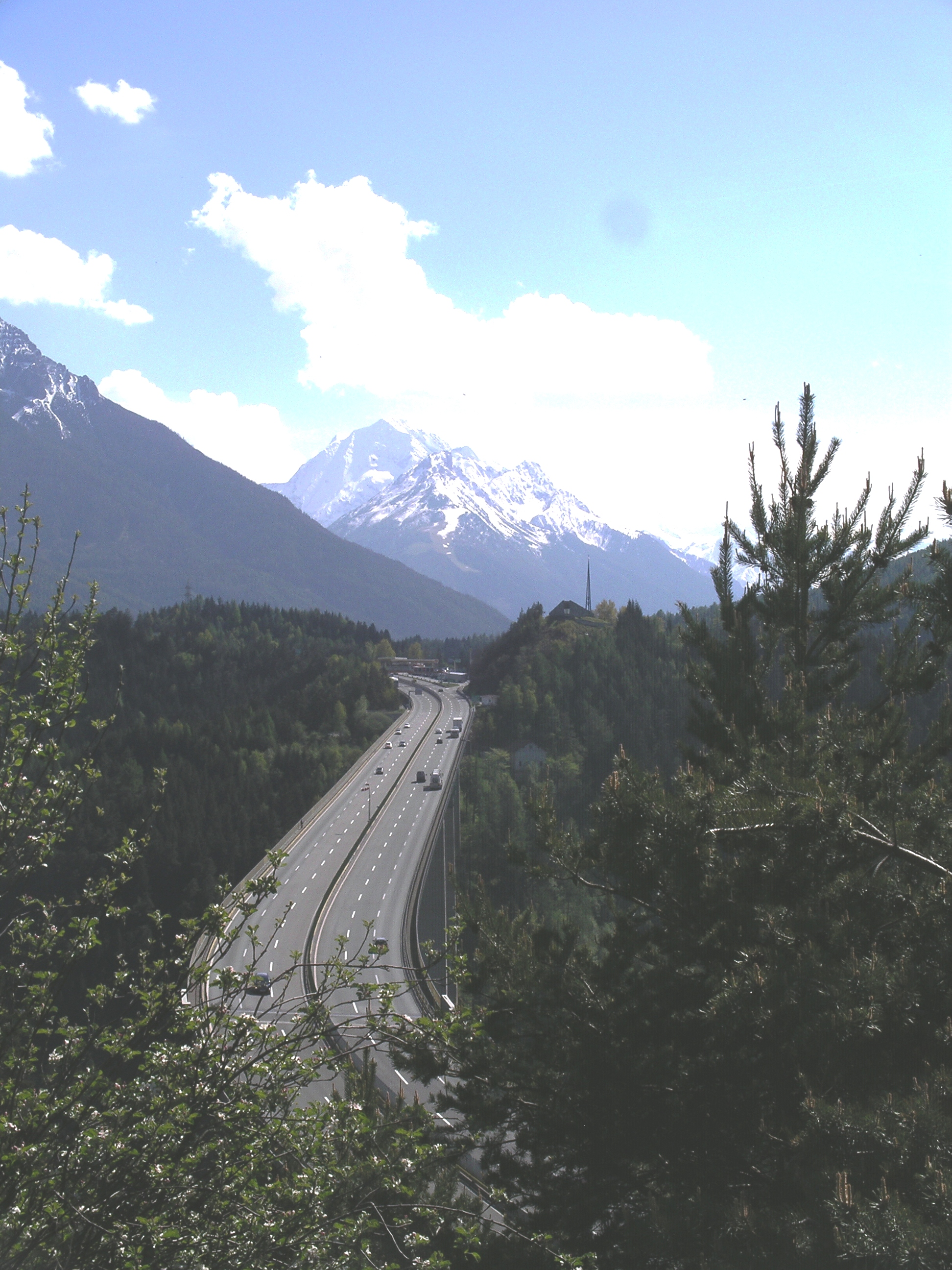
Brenner Pass motorway

Some notable passes of the Eastern Rhaetian Alps are:

- Brenner Pass
- Jaufenpass
- Penser Joch
- Reschen Pass
- Timmelsjoch

== Bibliography ==
- Saglio, Silvio (1939). Alpi Venoste Passerie Breonie - dal Resia al Brennero (Collana Guida dei Monti d'Italia) (in Italian). Club Alpino Italiano and Touring Club Italiano.

== Maps ==
- Italian official cartography (Istituto Geografico Militare - IGM); on-line version: www.pcn.minambiente.it
