= Valvelspitze =

Mountain in Italy

- Location within Alps

Highest point
- Elevation: 3,360 m (11,020 ft)
- Prominence: 229 m (751 ft)
- Parent peak: Rabenkopf (Weißkugel)
- Coordinates: 46°46′06″N 10°40′14″E

Geography
- Location: South Tyrol, Italy
- Parent range: Ötztal Alps

The Valvelspitze (Italian: Punta Valbella) is a mountain in the Planeil group of the Ötztal Alps.
