= Rabenkopf (Ötztal Alps) =

Mountain in Italy

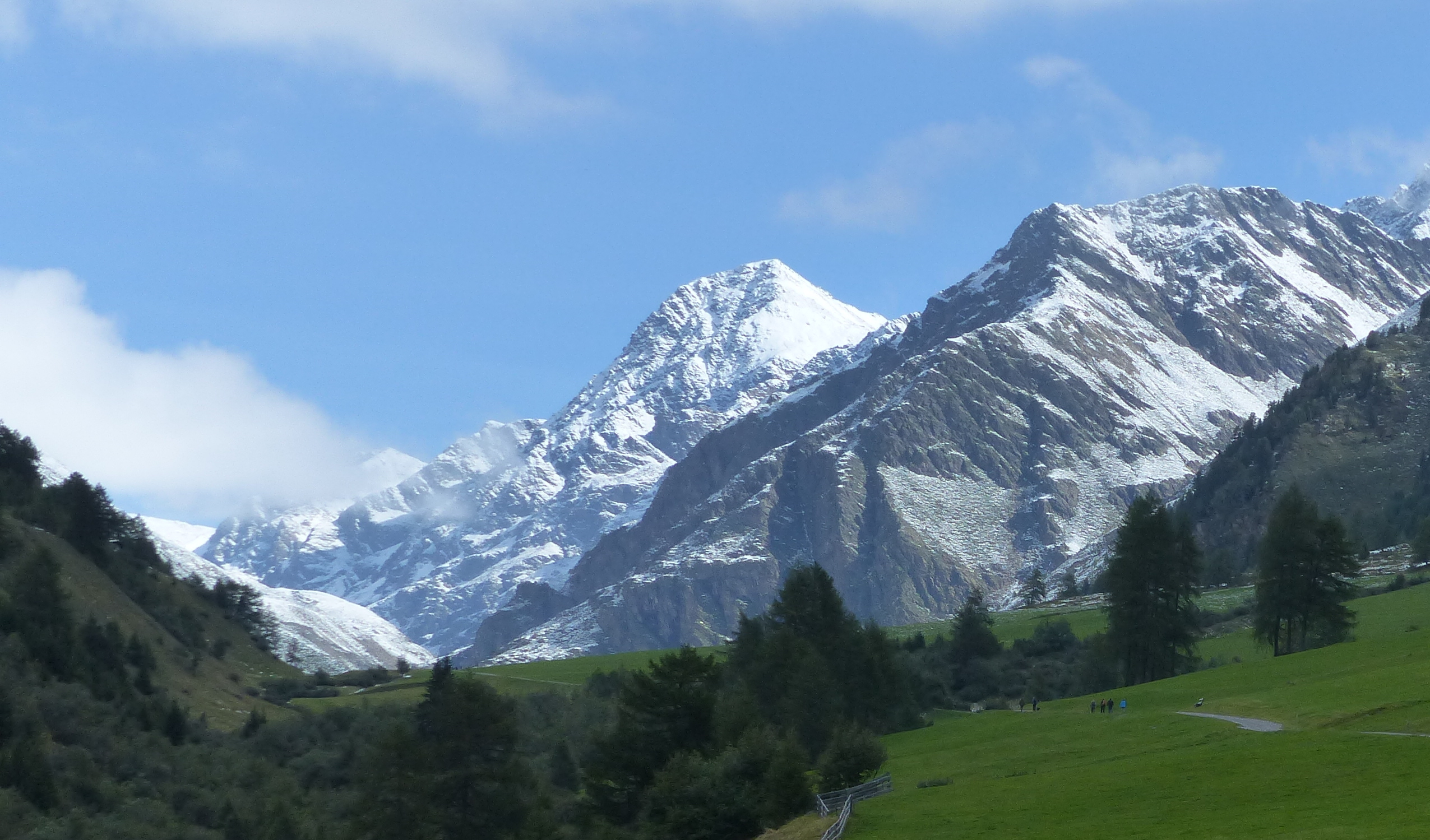

Highest point
- Elevation: 3,394 m (11,135 ft)
- Prominence: 195 m (640 ft)
- Parent peak: Äußerer Bärenbartkogel (Weißkugel)
- Coordinates: 46°47′01″N 10°40′24″E

Geography
- Location within Alps
- Location: South Tyrol, Italy
- Parent range: Ötztal Alps

Climbing
- First ascent: 1895 by Dr Souchon, A. Tschiderer, and Dr C. Vogt

The Rabenkopf (Italian: Cima dei Corvi) is a mountain in the Planeil group of the Ötztal Alps.
