= Im Hinteren Eis =

Mountain in Italy

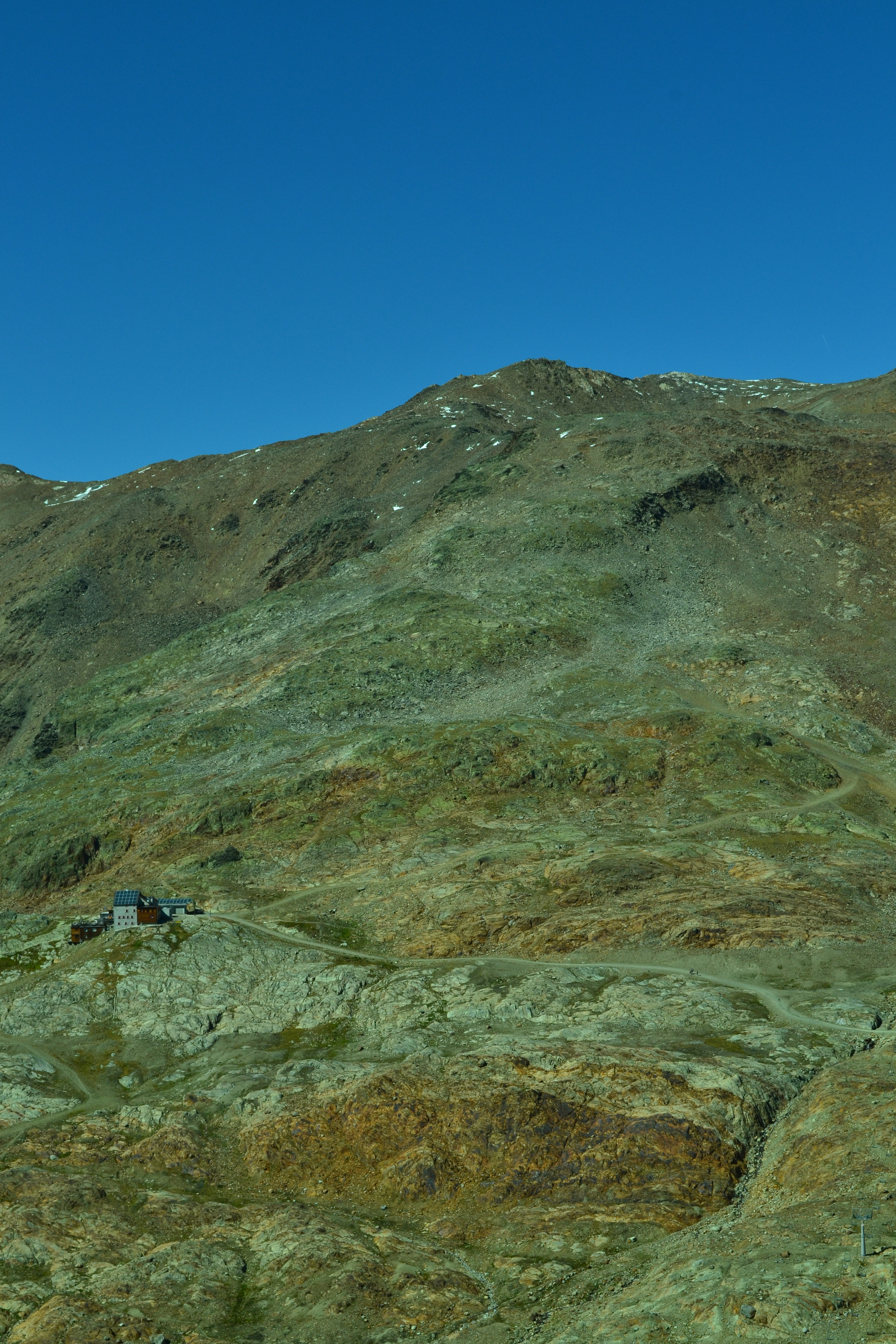
- View of Im Hinteren Eis from the ascent to Grawand.

Highest point
- Elevation: 3,270 m (10,730 ft)
- Coordinates: 46°47′0″N 10°46′0″E

Geography
- Location within Austria
- Location: Tyrol, Austria / South Tyrol, Italy
- Parent range: Ötztal Alps

Im Hinteren Eis is a mountain in the Ötztal Alps on the border between Tyrol, Austria, and South Tyrol, Italy.
