= Wildnörderer =

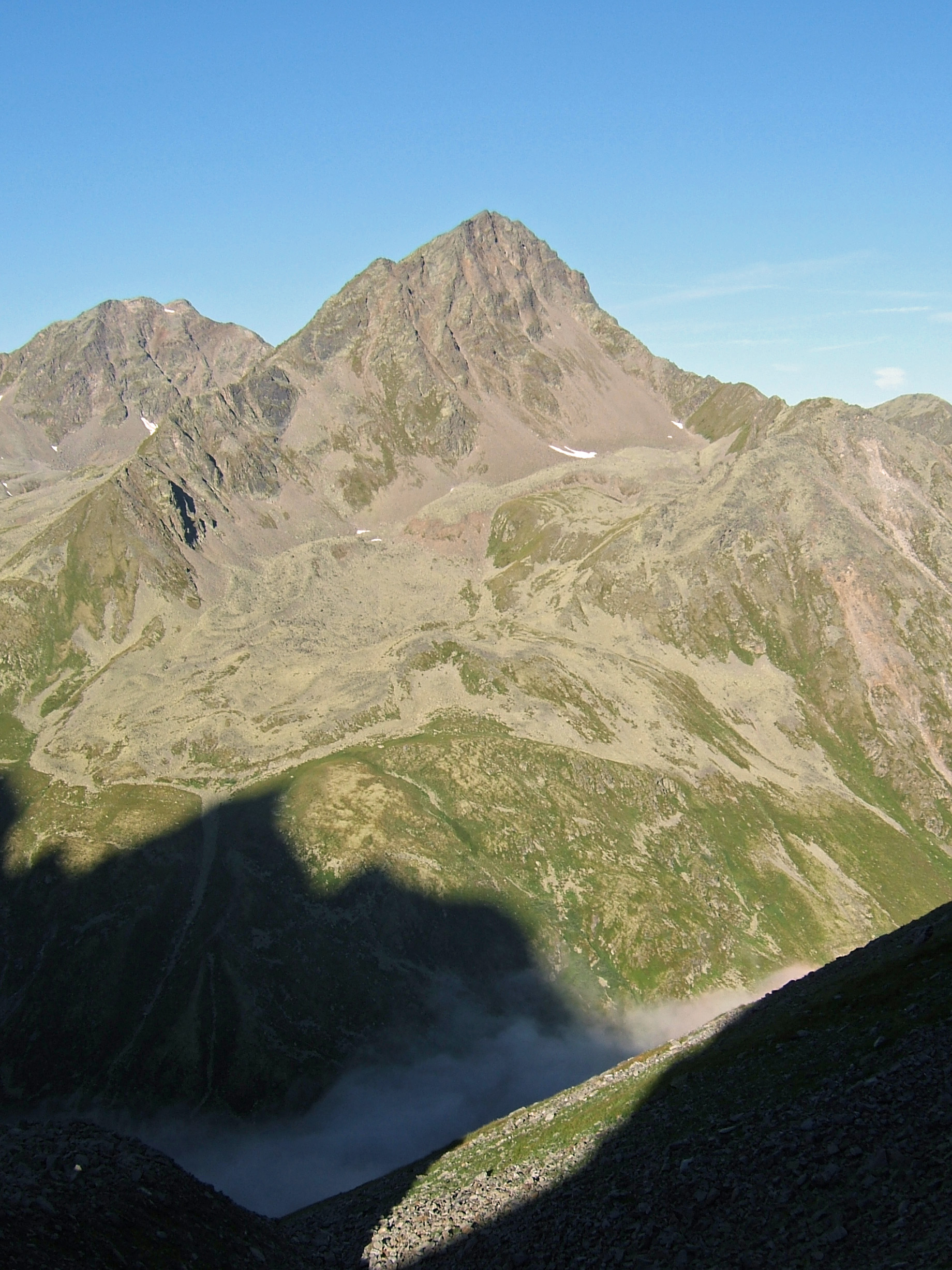
- Wildnörderer from the southeast

Highest point
- Elevation: 3,015 m (9,892 ft)
- Prominence: 225 m (738 ft)
- Parent peak: Seekarköpfe (Glockturm)
- Coordinates: 46°53′29″N 10°36′55″E

Geography
- Location within Austria
- Location: Tyrol, Austria
- Parent range: Ötztal Alps

Climbing
- First ascent: 1894 by First touristic ascent by A. Durkhardt (much earlier by locals)
- Easiest route: South ridge

The Wildnörderer is a mountain in the Nauderer group of the Ötztal Alps.
