= Luibiskogel =

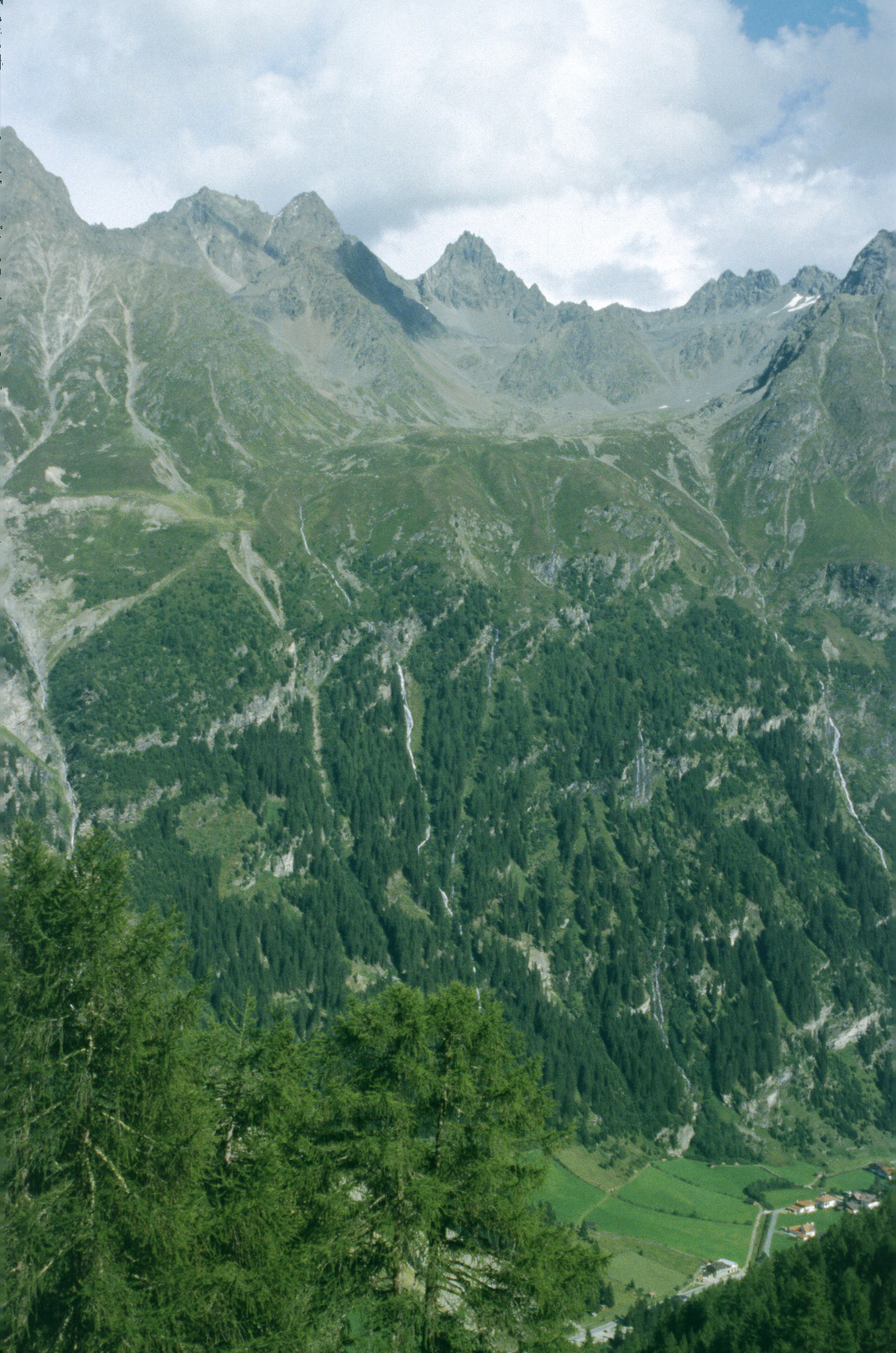
- Luibiskogel from the west over the Pitztal

Highest point
- Elevation: 3,110 m (10,200 ft)
- Prominence: 473 m (1,552 ft)
- Parent peak: Hohe Geige (Wildspitze)
- Listing: Alpine mountains above 3000 m
- Coordinates: 47°02′59″N 10°54′15″E

Geography
- Location within Austria
- Location: Tyrol, Austria
- Parent range: Ötztal Alps

Climbing
- First ascent: 1894 by M. Peer, L. Prochaska
- Easiest route: Over the southeast ridge

The Luibiskogel is a mountain in the Geigenkamm group of the Ötztal Alps.
