= Weißkogel =

Weißkogel is the name of the following mountains in the Alps:

- Längentaler Weißer Kogel in the Stubai Alps
- Weißkugel in the Ötztal Alps
- Winnebacher Weißkogel in the Stubai Alps
