= Seekarköpfe =

Austrian mountain

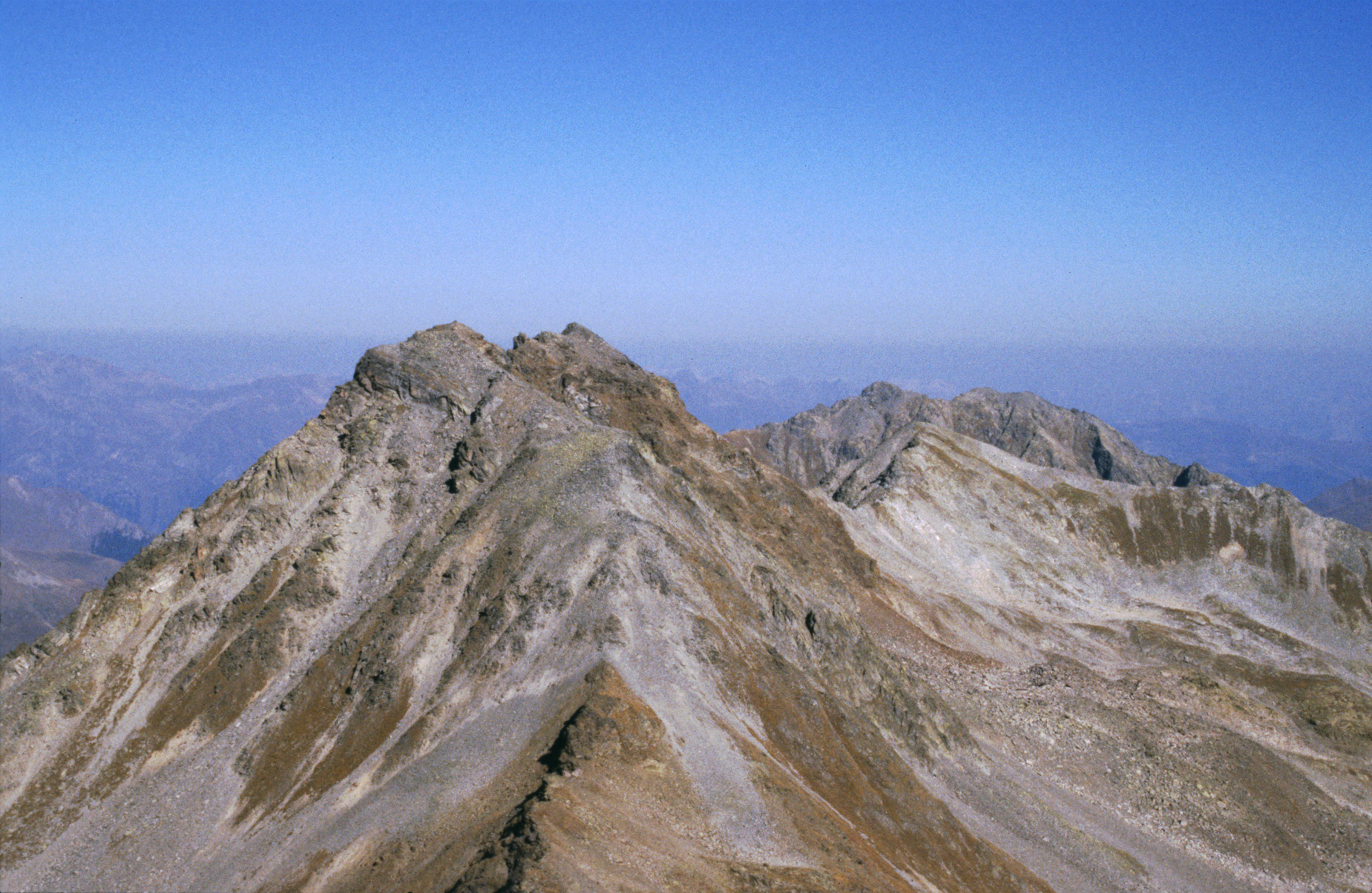
- Seekarköpfe from the south

Highest point
- Elevation: 3,063 m (10,049 ft)
- Prominence: 200 m (660 ft)
- Parent peak: Glockturm
- Coordinates: 46°52′25″N 10°37′09″E

Geography
- Location within Austria
- Location: Tyrol, Austria
- Parent range: Ötztal Alps

Climbing
- Easiest route: From Hohenzollernhaus over the Seekarscharte.

Seekarköpfe is a mountain in the Nauderer group of the Ötztal Alps in Western Austria.
