= Banker Kirchenkogel =

- Location within Austria

Highest point
- Elevation: 3,115 m (10,220 ft)
- Prominence: 160 m (520 ft)
- Parent peak: Schermerspitze (3,117 m)
- Coordinates: 46°53′57″N 11°04′51″E

Geography
- Location: Tyrol, Austria
- Parent range: Ötztal Alps

The Banker Kirchenkogel is a mountain in the Gurgler Kamm group of the Ötztal Alps.
