= Äußerer Bärenbartkogel =

Mountain in Italy

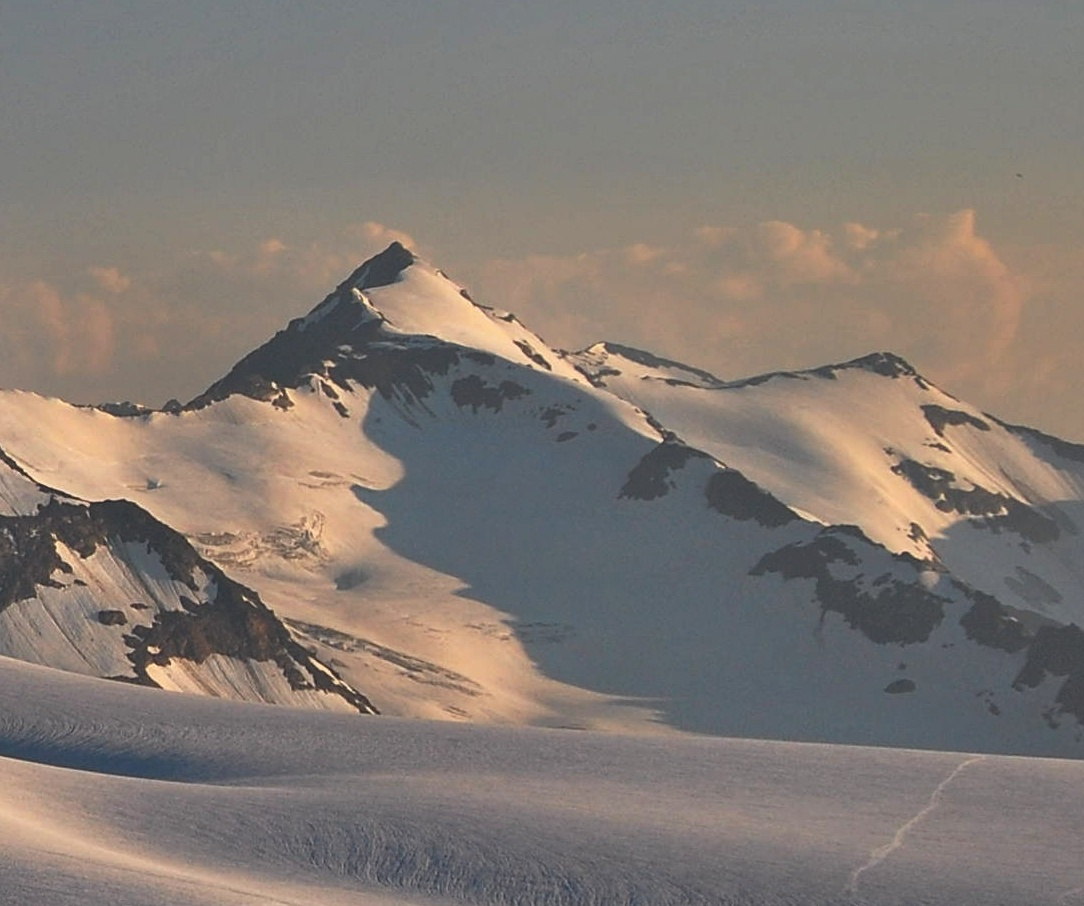

Highest point
- Elevation: 3,473 m (11,394 ft)
- Prominence: 167 m (548 ft)
- Parent peak: Weißkugel
- Coordinates: 46°47′51″N 10°41′56″E

Geography
- Location within Alps
- Location: South Tyrol, Italy

Climbing
- First ascent: 1909 by Fridolin Hohenleitner and J. Plattner
- Easiest route: East ridge

The Äußerer Bärenbartkogel (Italian: Cima Barba d'Orsa di Fuori) is a mountain in the Planeil group of the Ötztal Alps in South Tyrol, Italy.
