= Hundstalkogel =

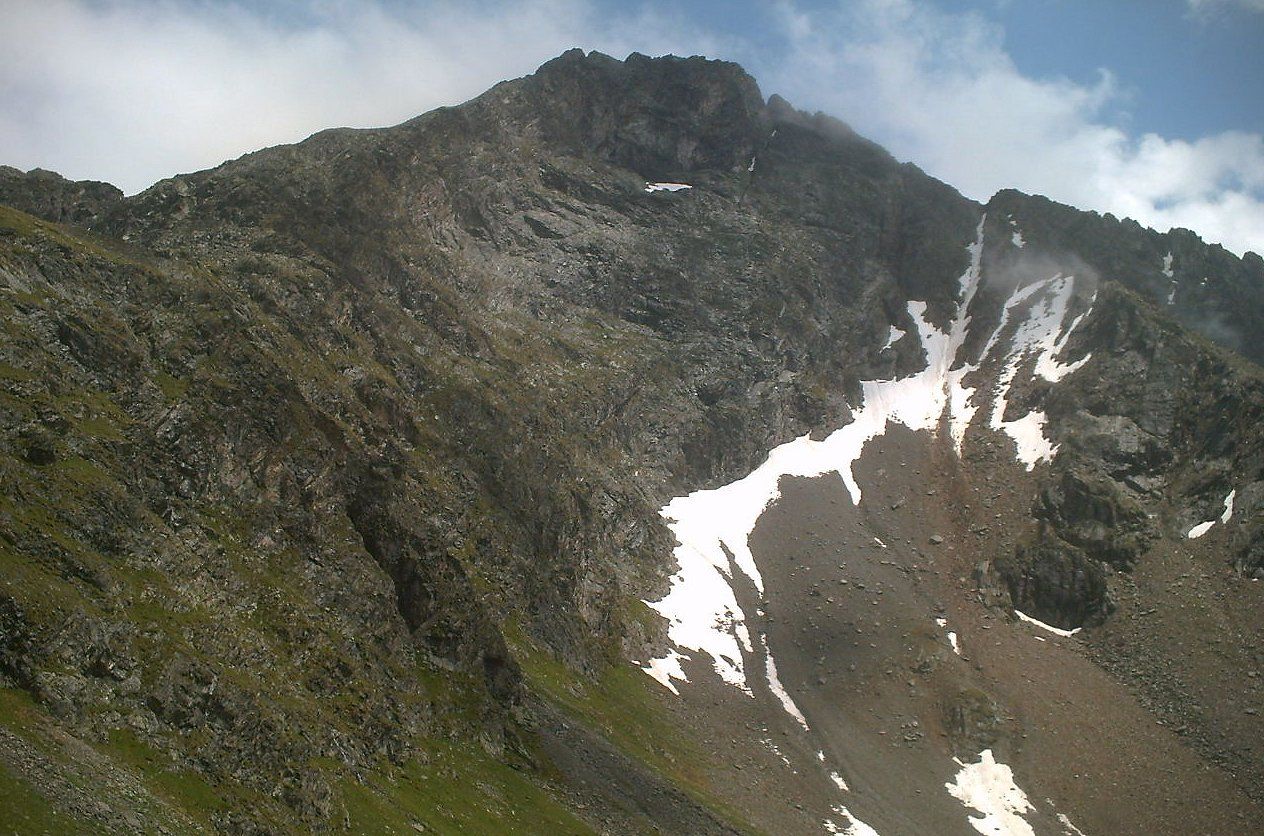
- Hundstalkogel the northwest from Bichl in Sankt Leonhard im Pitztal

Highest point
- Elevation: 3,080 m (10,100 ft)
- Prominence: 279 m (915 ft)
- Parent peak: Reiserkogel (Luibiskogel)
- Coordinates: 47°01′57″N 10°53′35″E

Geography
- Location within Austria
- Location: Tyrol, Austria
- Parent range: Ötztal Alps

Climbing
- First ascent: 1889 by F. Hörtnagl, L. Prochaska und F. Stolz

The Hundstalkogel is a mountain in the Geigenkamm group of the Ötztal Alps.
