= Fineilspitze =

Mountain in Italy

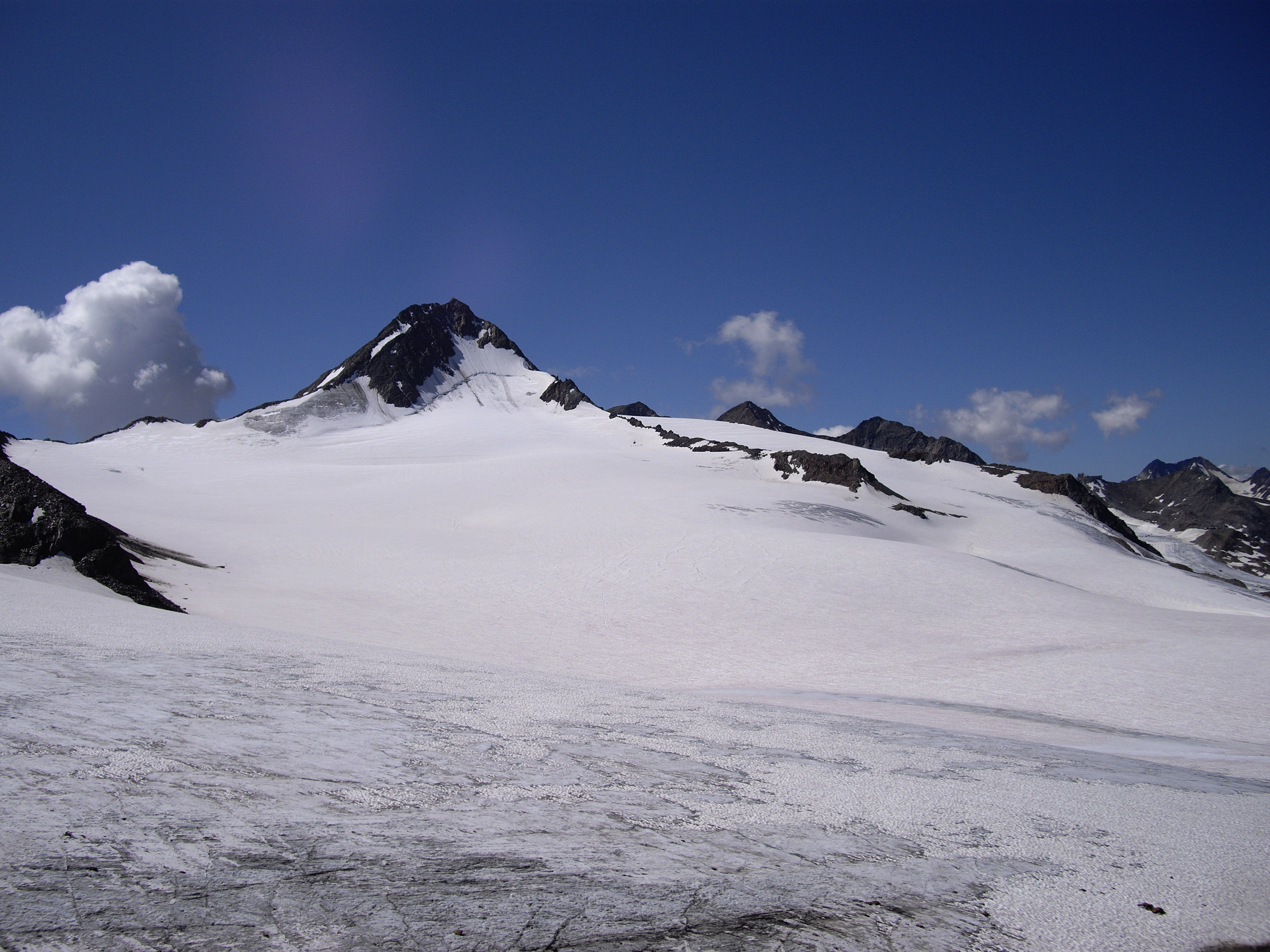
- Fineilspitze from the north.

Highest point
- Elevation: 3,514 m (11,529 ft)
- Prominence: 497 m (1,631 ft)
- Parent peak: Similaun (Hintere Schwärze)
- Listing: Alpine mountains above 3000 m
- Coordinates: 46°46′49″N 10°49′54″E

Geography
- Location within Austria
- Location: Tyrol, Austria / South Tyrol, Italy
- Parent range: Ötztal Alps

Climbing
- First ascent: 8 September 1865 by Franz Senn with the guides Cyprian Granbichler and Josef Gstrein
- Easiest route: Northeast or southwest

The Fineilspitze (Italian: Punta di Finale) is a peak in the Schnalskamm group of the Ötztal Alps on the border between Tyrol, Austria, and South Tyrol, Italy. It is known for being the discovery site of Ötzi.
