= Ehrichspitze =

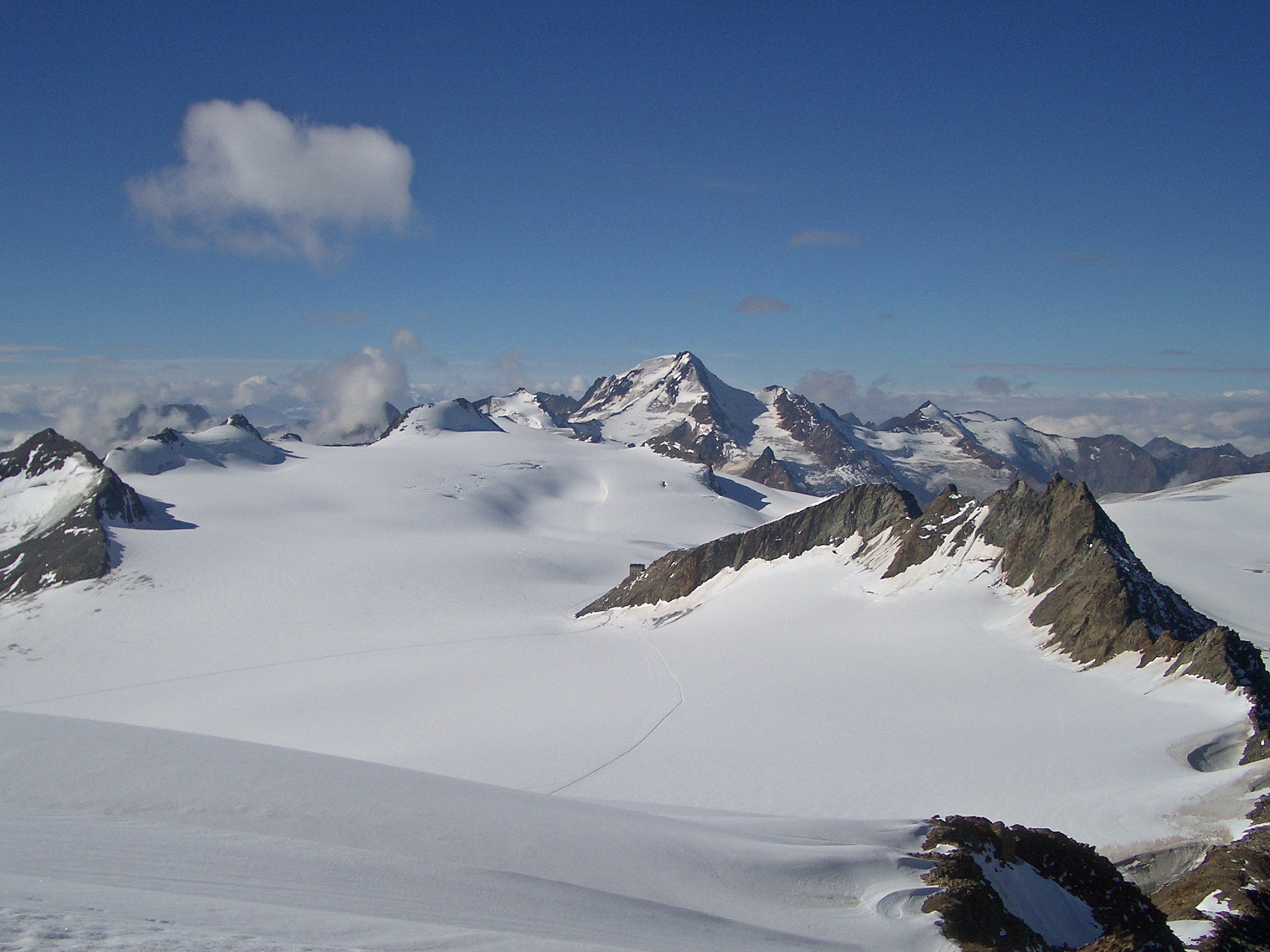
- View from the Fluchtkogel to the southwest over the Kesselwandferner (foreground) and the massive Gepatschferner (background and right). The Brandenburger Haus is in the middle of the picture, at the foot of the double peaks Dahmannspitze and Ehrichspitze (right) that are embedded in the glaciers. In the background are the Hintereisspitzen (left) and Weißkugel (3736 m).

Highest point
- Elevation: 3,420 m (11,220 ft)
- Prominence: 115 m (377 ft)
- Parent peak: Fluchtkogel
- Coordinates: 46°50′57″N 10°46′34″E

Geography
- Location within Austria
- Location: Tyrol, Austria
- Parent range: Ötztal Alps

Climbing
- Easiest route: East face (UIAA-II)

The Ehrichspitze is a mountain in the Weisskamm group of the Ötztal Alps.
