= Schermerspitze =

Mountain in the Ötztal Alps in Tyrol, Austria

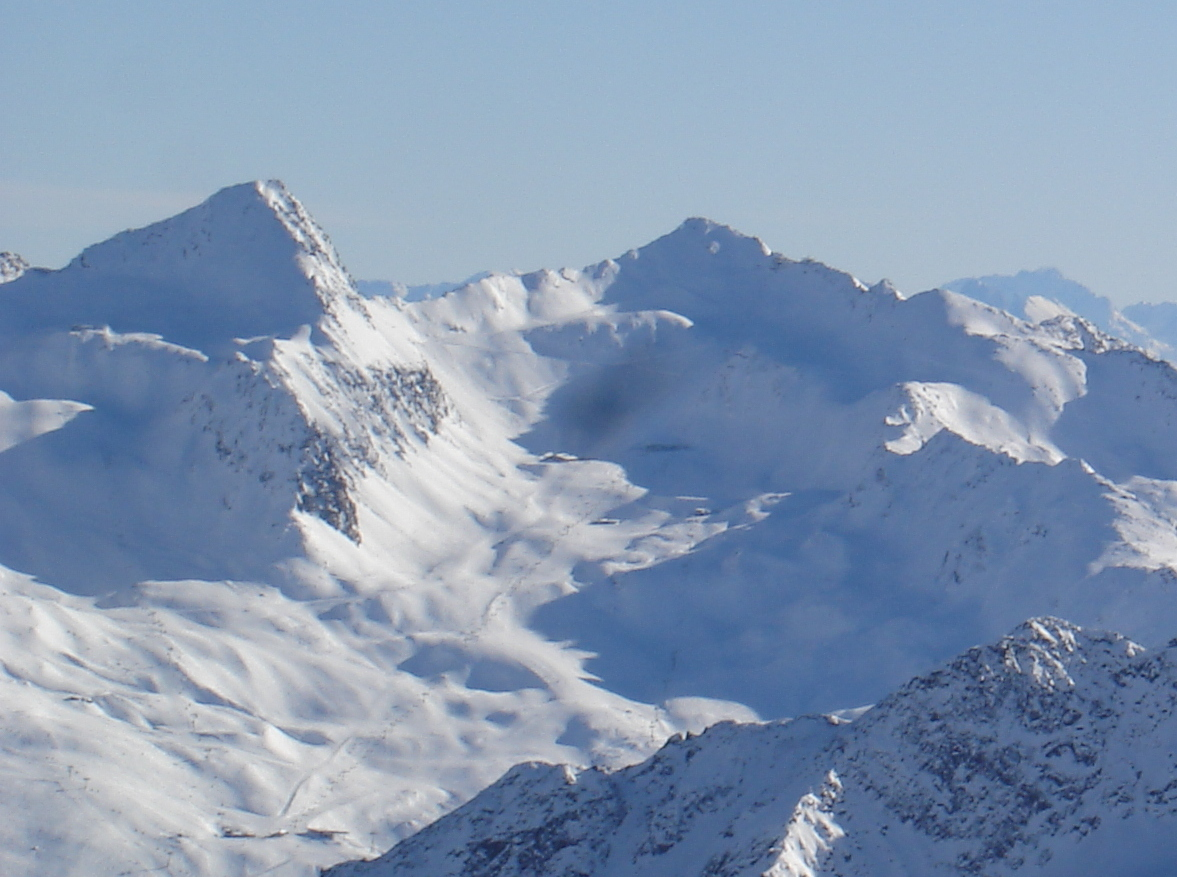
- Schermerspitze.

Highest point
- Elevation: 3,117 m (10,226 ft)
- Prominence: 295 m (968 ft)
- Parent peak: Granatenkogel (Hochfirst)
- Listing: Alpine mountains above 3000 m
- Coordinates: 46°53′16″N 11°05′04″E

Geography
- Location within Austria
- Location: Tyrol, Austria
- Parent range: Ötztal Alps

The Schermerspitze is a mountain in the Gurgler Kamm group of the Ötztal Alps.
