= Endkopf =

Mountain in Italy

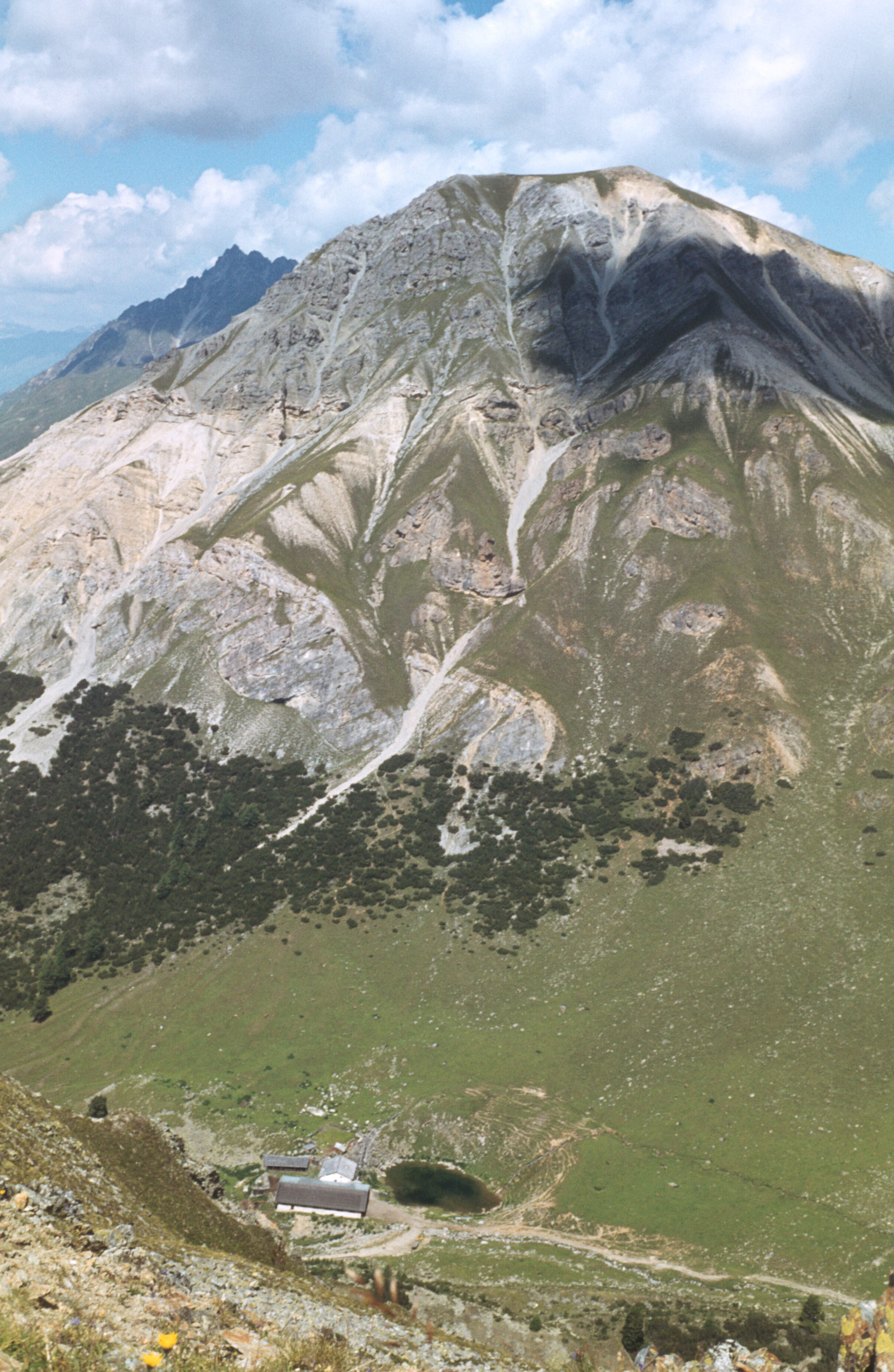

Highest point
- Elevation: 2,652 m (8,701 ft)
- Coordinates: 46°47′37″N 10°33′54″E

Geography
- Location within Italy
- Location: South Tyrol, Italy
- Parent range: Ötztal Alps

The Endkopf (Italian: Cima Termine; German: Endkopf) is a mountain in the Ötztal Alps in South Tyrol, Italy.
