= Hochalt =

Mountain in Italy

- Location within Italy

Highest point
- Elevation: 3,285 m (10,778 ft)
- Prominence: 265 m (869 ft)
- Parent peak: Saldurspitze (Lagaunspitze)
- Coordinates: 46°41′55″N 10°43′33″E

Geography
- Location: South Tyrol, Italy
- Parent range: Ötztal Alps

Climbing
- First ascent: 1894 by Burckhardt

The Hochalt (Italian: Monte Alto) is a mountain in the Saldurkamm group of the Ötztal Alps.
