= Remsspitze =

Mountain in Italy

- Location within Alps

Highest point
- Elevation: 3,205 m (10,515 ft)
- Prominence: 273 m (896 ft)
- Parent peak: Saldurspitze (Lagaunspitze)
- Coordinates: 46°41′40″N 10°40′36″E

Geography
- Location: South Tyrol, Italy
- Parent range: Ötztal Alps

The Remsspitze (Italian: Punta di Remes) is a mountain in the Saldurkamm group of the Ötztal Alps.
