= Nauderer Hennesiglspitze =

Mountain in Italy

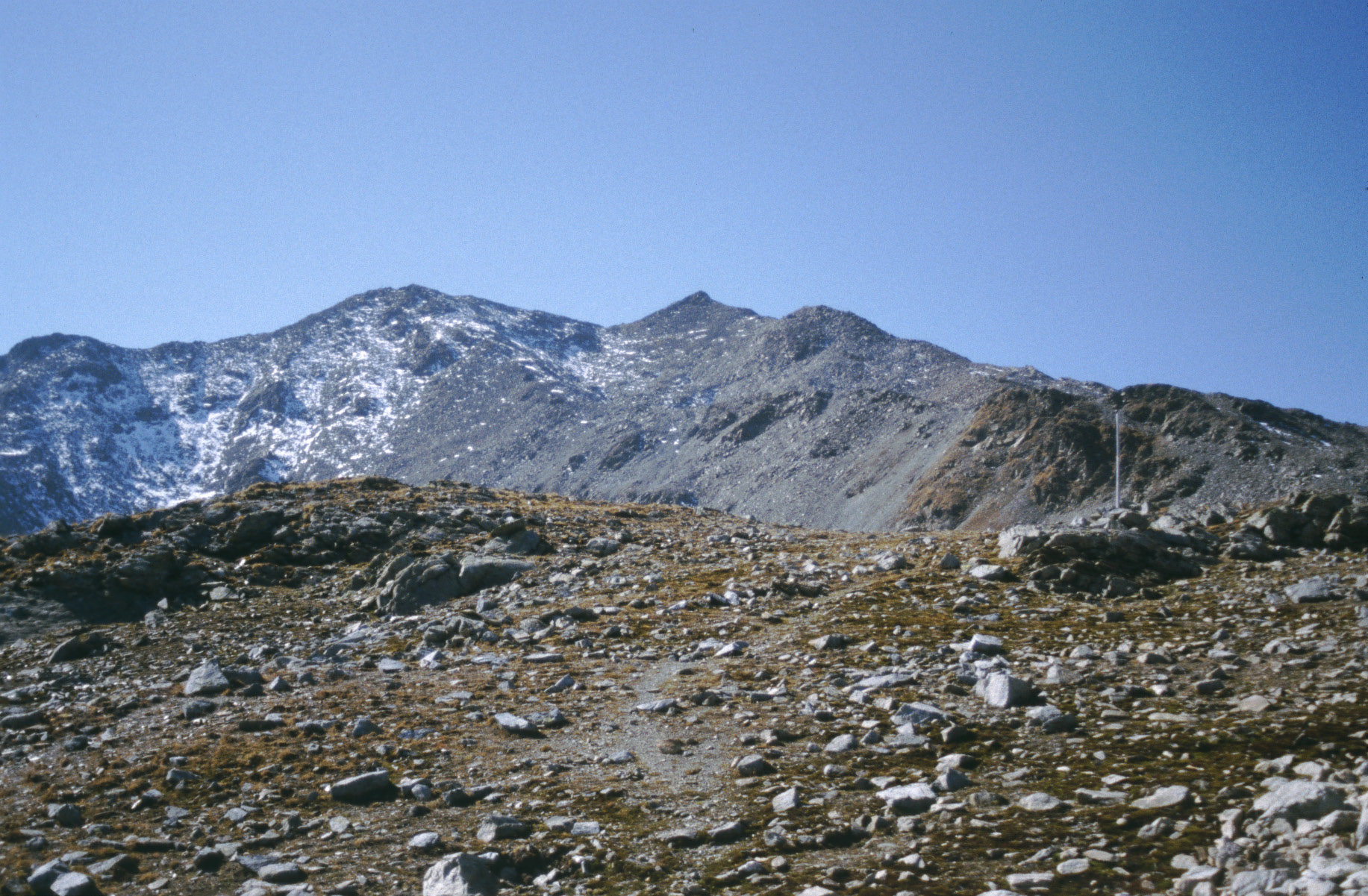

Highest point
- Elevation: 3,042 m (9,980 ft)
- Coordinates: 46°51′52″N 10°37′27″E

Geography
- Location: Tyrol, Austria / South Tyrol, Italy
- Parent range: Ötztal Alps

The Nauderer Hennesiglspitze is a mountain in the Ötztal Alps on the border between Tyrol, Austria, and South Tyrol, Italy.
