= Nederkogel =

Mountain

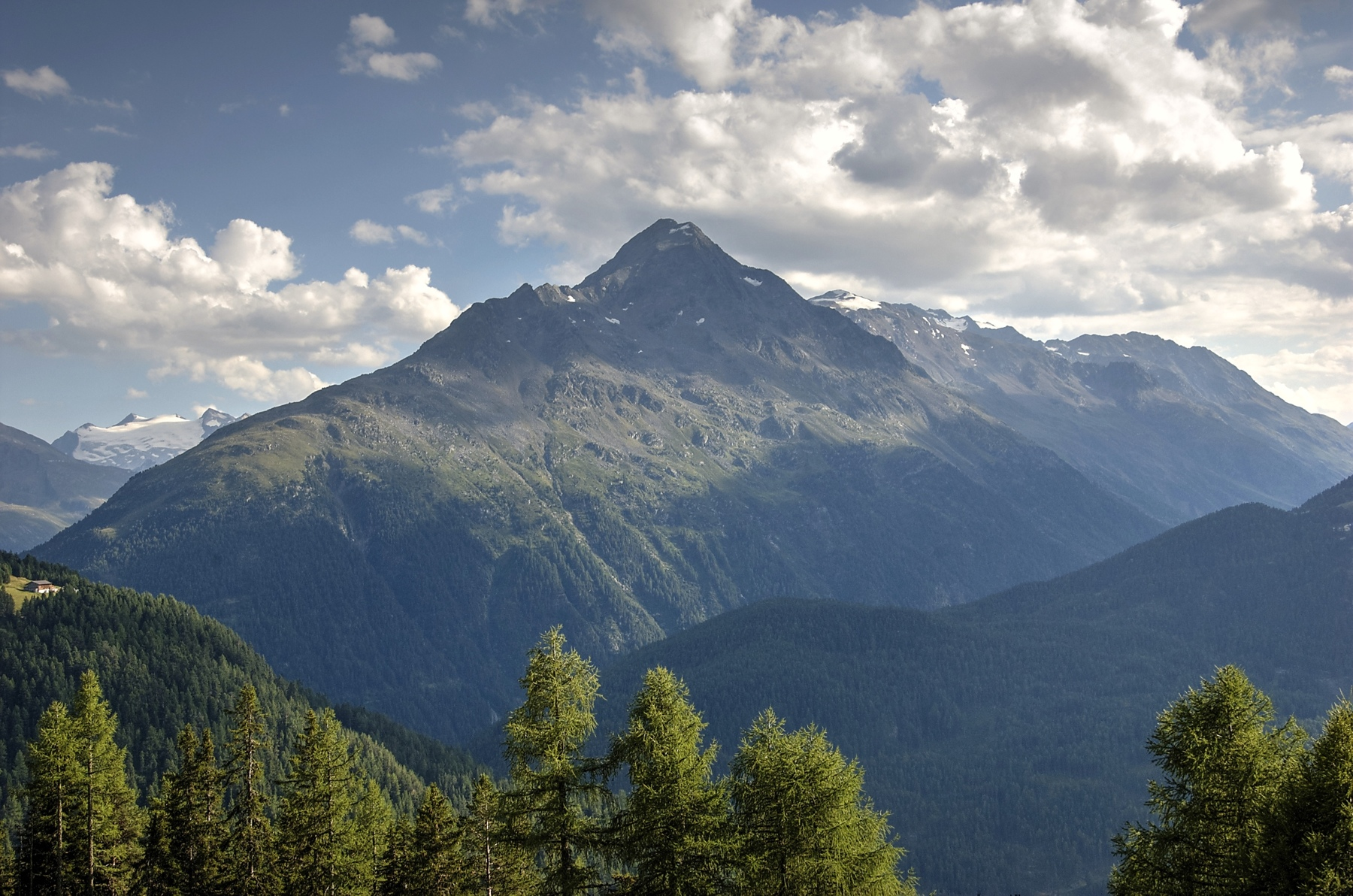
- View from Sölden on the Ramolkamm ridge of the Ötztal Alps, with the Nederkogel in the center of the image.

Highest point
- Elevation: 3,163 m (10,377 ft)
- Prominence: 233 m (764 ft)
- Parent peak: Ramolkogel
- Coordinates: 46°54′25″N 11°00′33″E

Geography
- Location within Austria
- Location: Tyrol, Austria
- Parent range: Ötztal Alps

The Nederkogel or Nörderkogel is a mountain in the Ramolkamm group of the Ötztal Alps.
