= Hinterer Seelenkogel =

Mountain in Italy

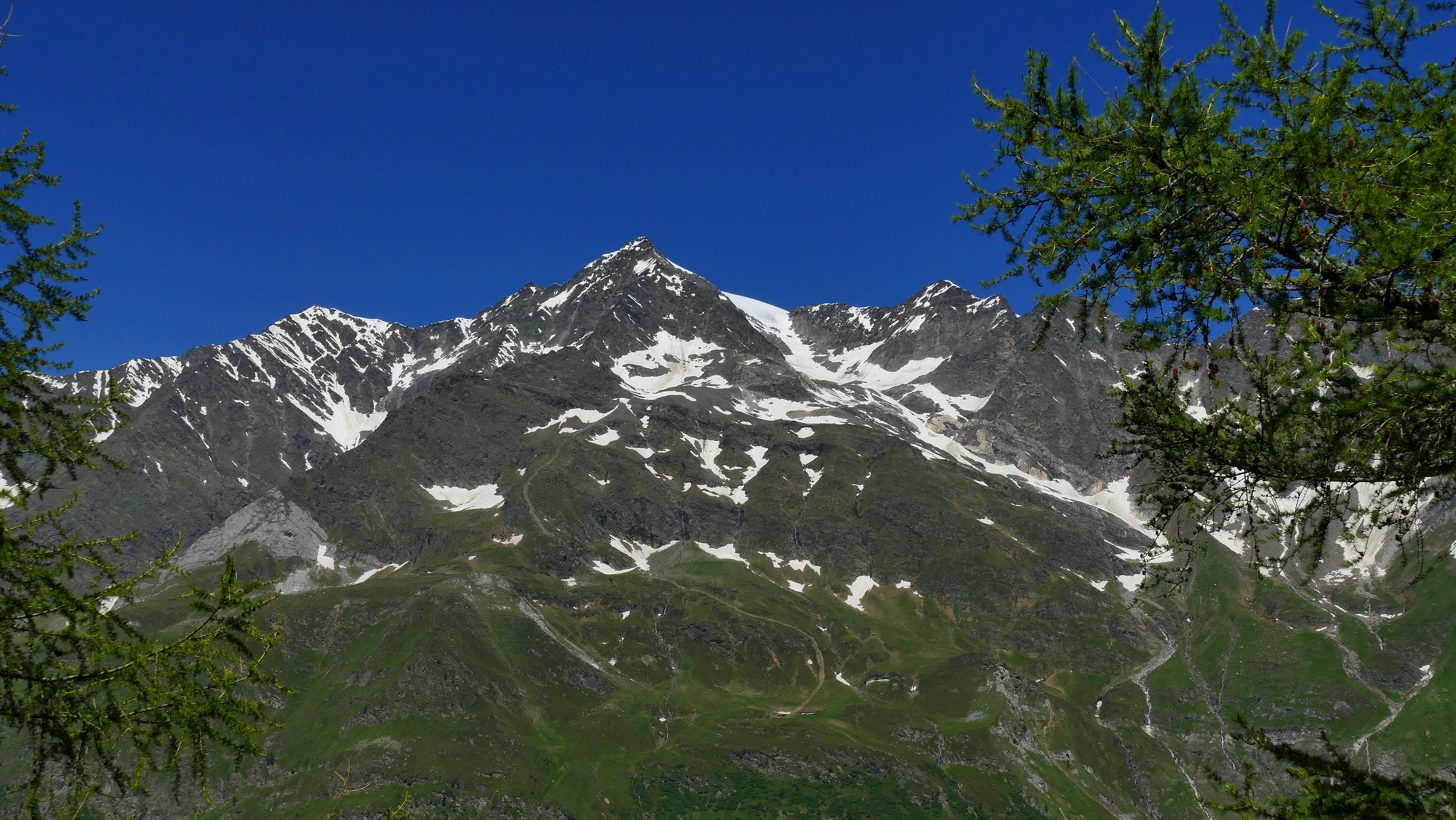
- Hinterer Seelenkogel

Highest point
- Elevation: 3,472 m (11,391 ft)
- Prominence: 443 m (1,453 ft)
- Parent peak: Hochwilde
- Listing: Alpine mountains above 3000 m
- Coordinates: 46°48′05″N 11°02′40″E

Geography
- Location within Austria
- Location: Tyrol, Austria / South Tyrol, Italy
- Parent range: Ötztal Alps

Climbing
- First ascent: 1871

The Hinterer Seelenkogel (Italian: Cima delle Anime) is a mountain in the Gurgler Kamm group of the Ötztal Alps.

== See also ==
- List of mountains of the Alps
