= Glockturm =

Mountain in Austria

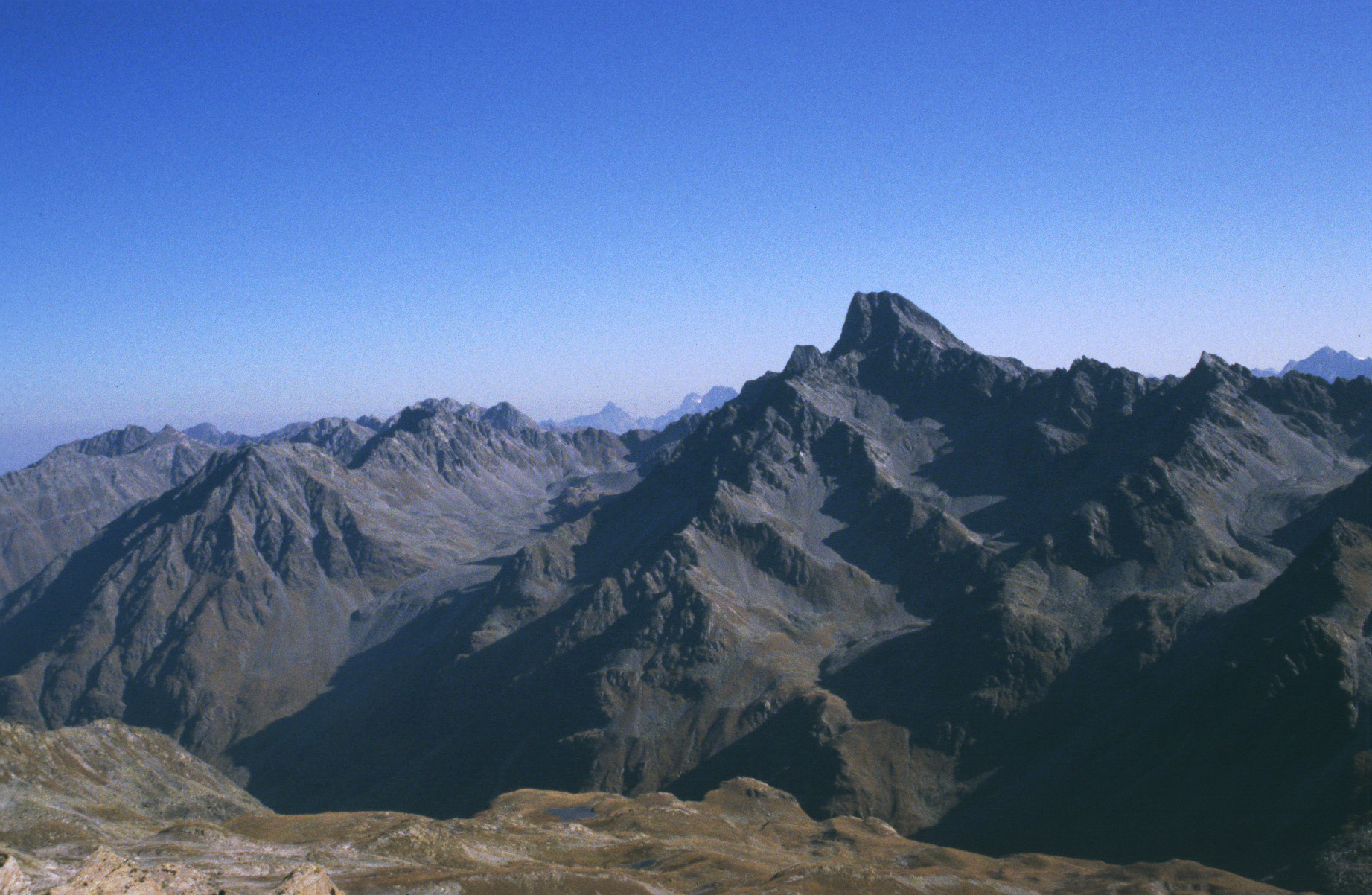
- Glockturm from the southwest from the Nauderer Hennesiglspitze

Highest point
- Elevation: 3,355 m (11,007 ft)
- Prominence: 413 m (1,355 ft)
- Parent peak: Weißseespitze (Wildspitze)
- Listing: Alpine mountains above 3000 m
- Coordinates: 46°53′35″N 10°39′56″E

Geography
- Location within Austria
- Location: Tyrol, Austria
- Parent range: Ötztal Alps

Climbing
- First ascent: 1853 by Pöltinger, for a geological survey

The Glockturm is the highest mountain in the Glockturmkamm group of the Ötztal Alps.
