= Hohe Geige =

Mountain in Austria

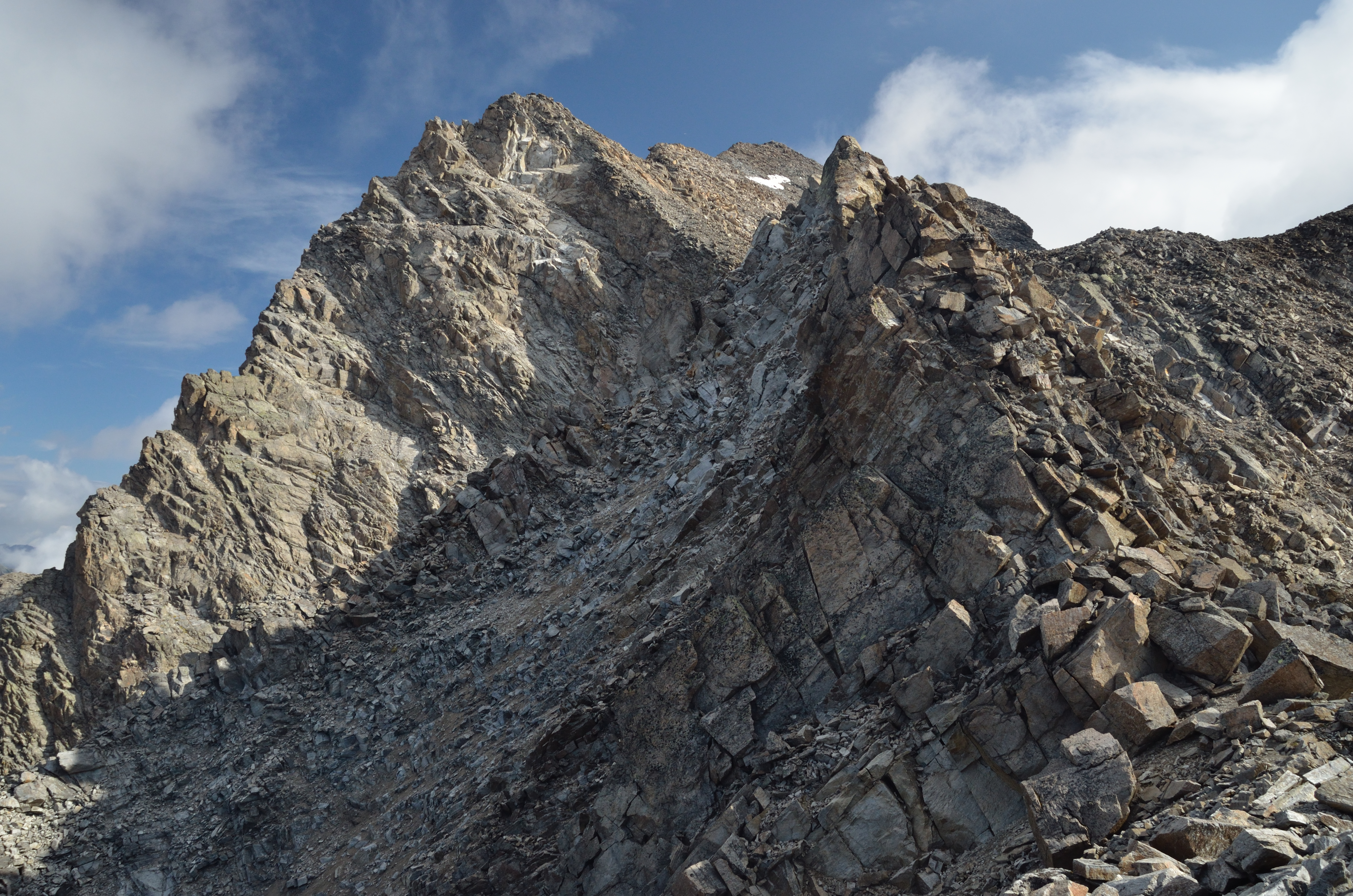

Highest point
- Elevation: 3,395 m (11,138 ft)
- Prominence: 456 m (1,496 ft)
- Parent peak: Wildspitze (via Weißer Kogel)
- Listing: Alpine mountains above 3000 m
- Coordinates: 47°00′17″N 10°54′31″E

Geography
- Location within Austria
- Location: Tyrol, Austria
- Parent range: Ötztal Alps

Climbing
- First ascent: 1853 by J. Ganahl, for a geological survey
- Easiest route: Southwest face from the Rüsselsheimer Hütte

The Hohe Geige is the highest mountain in the Geigenkamm group of the Ötztal Alps. It has a summit elevation of 3,395 m (11,138 ft) above sea level.

== See also ==
- List of mountains of the Alps
