= Hintere Schwärze =

Mountain in Italy

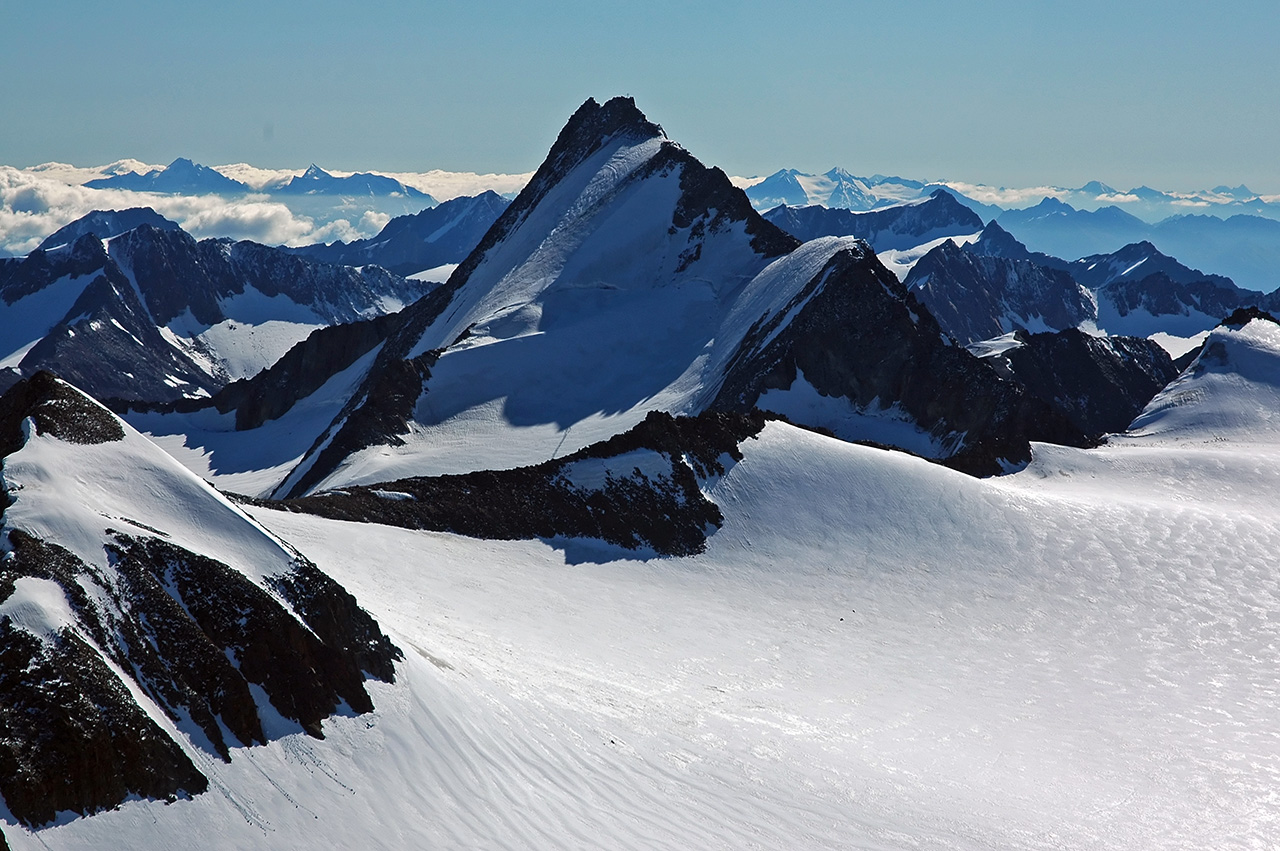
- Hintere Schwarze in summer 2005

Highest point
- Elevation: 3,628 m (11,903 ft)
- Prominence: 805 m (2,641 ft)
- Parent peak: Weißkugel (Wildspitze)
- Listing: Alpine mountains above 3000 m
- Coordinates: 46°46′24″N 10°54′53″E

Geography
- Location: Tyrol, Austria / South Tyrol, Italy
- Parent range: Ötztal Alps

Climbing
- First ascent: 10 Sep 1867 by E. Pfeiffer, B. Klotz, J. Scheiber
- Easiest route: Glacier ascent over the west flank

Location in Austria

Hintere Schwärze (Austrian German pronunciation: [ˈhɪntərɛ ˈʃvɛrtsɛ]; Italian: Cima Nera) is a mountain on the border between Austria and Italy. At 3,628 metres (11,903 ft), it is the fourth highest peak in the Ötztal Alps.

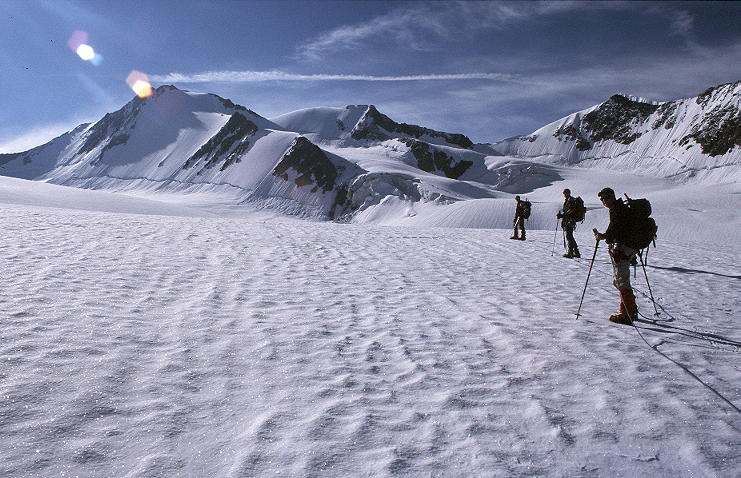
North face of Hintere Schwärze, June 2002
