= Grawand =

Mountain in South Tyrol, Italy

- Location within Alps

Highest point
- Elevation: 3,251 m (10,666 ft)
- Coordinates: 46°46′9″N 10°47′58″E

Geography
- Location: South Tyrol, Italy
- Parent range: Ötztal Alps

Climbing
- First ascent: 1853

The Grawand is a mountain in the Ötztal Alps in South Tyrol, Italy.
