= Similaun =

Mountain in Italy

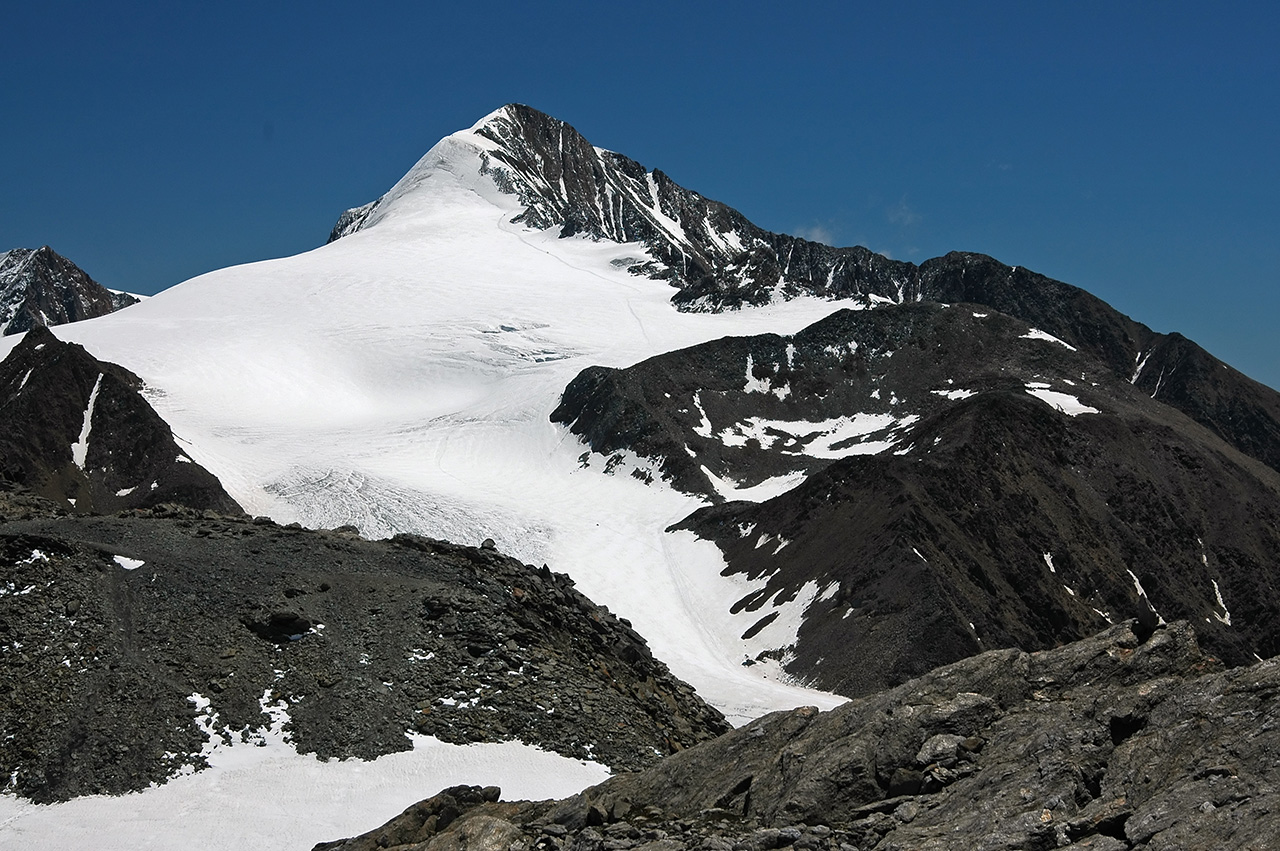
- The Similaun as seen from south

Highest point
- Elevation: 3,599 m (11,808 ft)
- Prominence: 259 m (850 ft)
- Parent peak: Hintere Schwärze
- Coordinates: 46°45′49″N 10°52′50″E

Geography
- Location within Austria
- Location: Tyrol, Austria / South Tyrol Italy
- Parent range: Ötztal Alps
- Topo map: BEV OK50 173

Climbing
- First ascent: 1833 by Peter Carl Thurwieser or in 1834 by Josef Raffeiner and Theodor Kaserer
- Easiest route: From the Similaunhütte over the Niederjoch glacier and west ridge

The Similaun (German pronunciation: [zimiˈlaʊn]) is a mountain in the Schnalskamm group of the Ötztal Alps. It is on the Austrian-Italian border. At 3,599 m, it is Austria's sixth highest summit. It was first ascended in 1834 by Josef Raffeiner and Theodor Kaserer. It is most famous for being the mountain on whose slopes Helmut Simon and Erika Simon discovered Ötzi the Iceman in 1991.

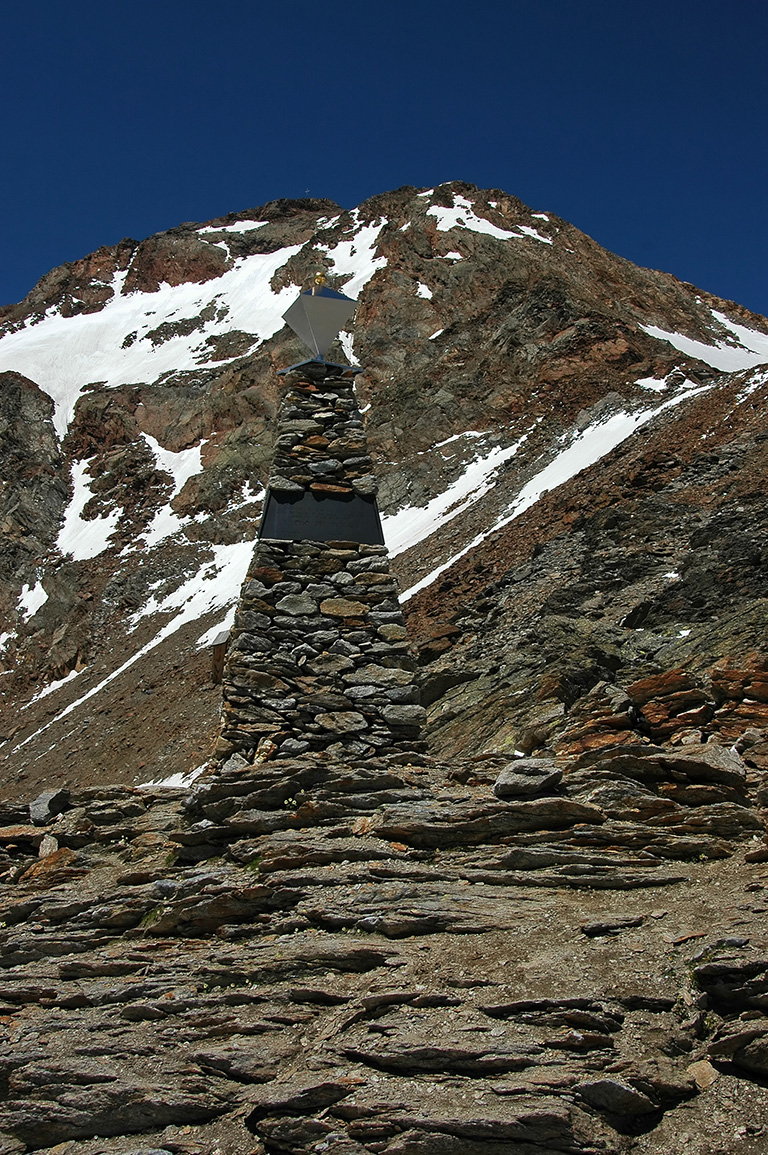
Ötzi memorial
