= Hochwilde =

Mountain in Italy

- Altissima
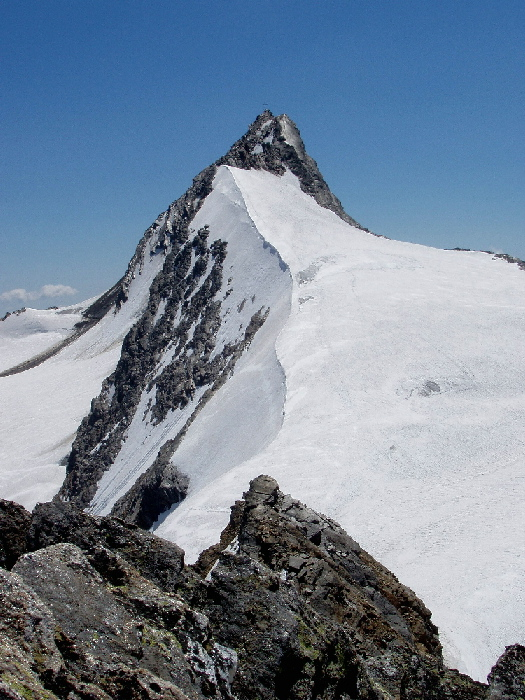

Highest point
- Elevation: 3,482 m (11,424 ft)
- Prominence: 343 m (1,125 ft)
- Parent peak: Schalfkogel
- Listing: Alpine mountains above 3000 m
- Coordinates: 46°45′59″N 11°1′25″E

Geography
- Location: Tyrol, Austria / South Tyrol, Italy
- Parent range: Ötztal Alps

Climbing
- First ascent: 1858 by J. Ganahl with peasants and shepherds
- Easiest route: South ridge from the Stettiner Hütte (marked route)

The Hochwilde or Hohe Wilde (Italian: Altissima) is a mountain in the Ötztal Alps on the border between Tyrol, Austria, and South Tyrol, Italy.

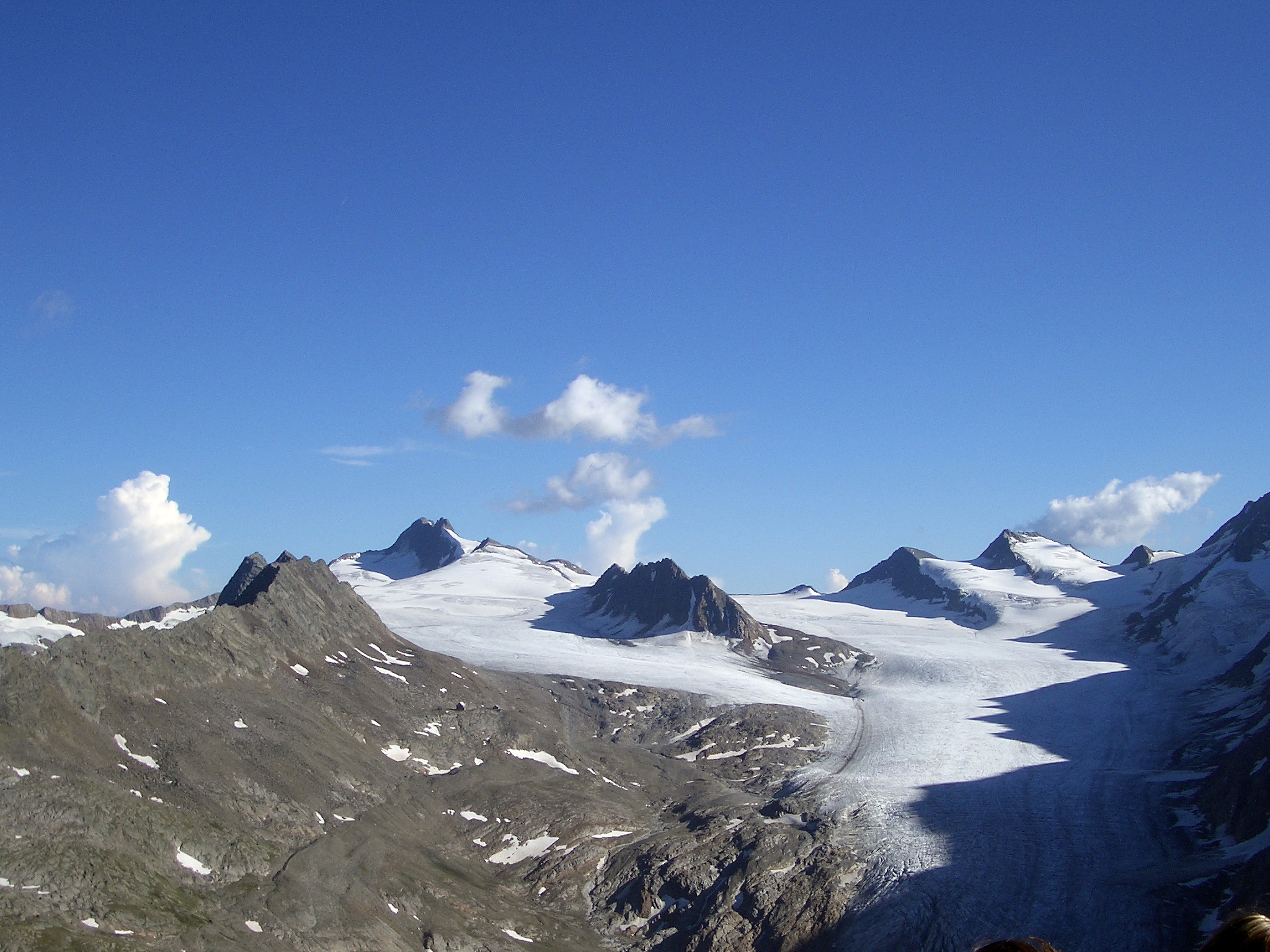
The Gurgelferner as seen from the Spiegelkogel to its north, with a distant Hochwilde left of the center.
