= Weißseespitze =

Mountain in Italy

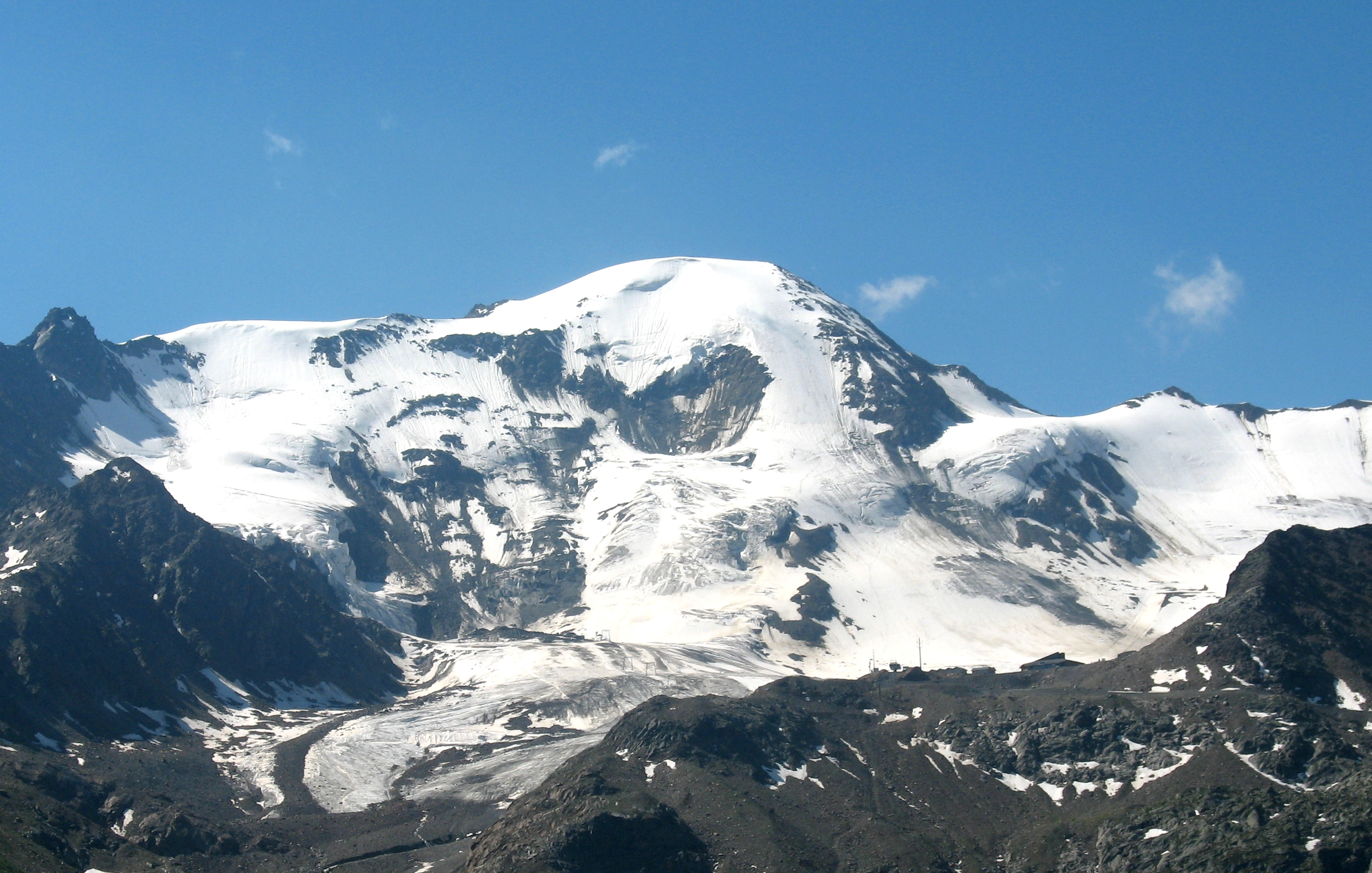
- Weißseespitze from the north.

Highest point
- Elevation: 3,518 m (11,542 ft)
- Prominence: 339 m (1,112 ft)
- Parent peak: Hochvernagtspitze
- Listing: Alpine mountains above 3000 m
- Coordinates: 46°50′48″N 10°43′02″E

Geography
- Location within Austria
- Location: Tyrol, Austria / South Tyrol, Italy
- Parent range: Ötztal Alps

Climbing
- First ascent: 1870 by Franz Senn, V. v. Mayrl. J. Wanderer and the guide I. Schöpf
- Easiest route: von Norden und über den Westgrat

The Weißseespitze is a mountain in the Weisskamm group of the Ötztal Alps. It has an elevation of 3,526 m above sea level.
