= Wildspitze =

Mountain in Austria

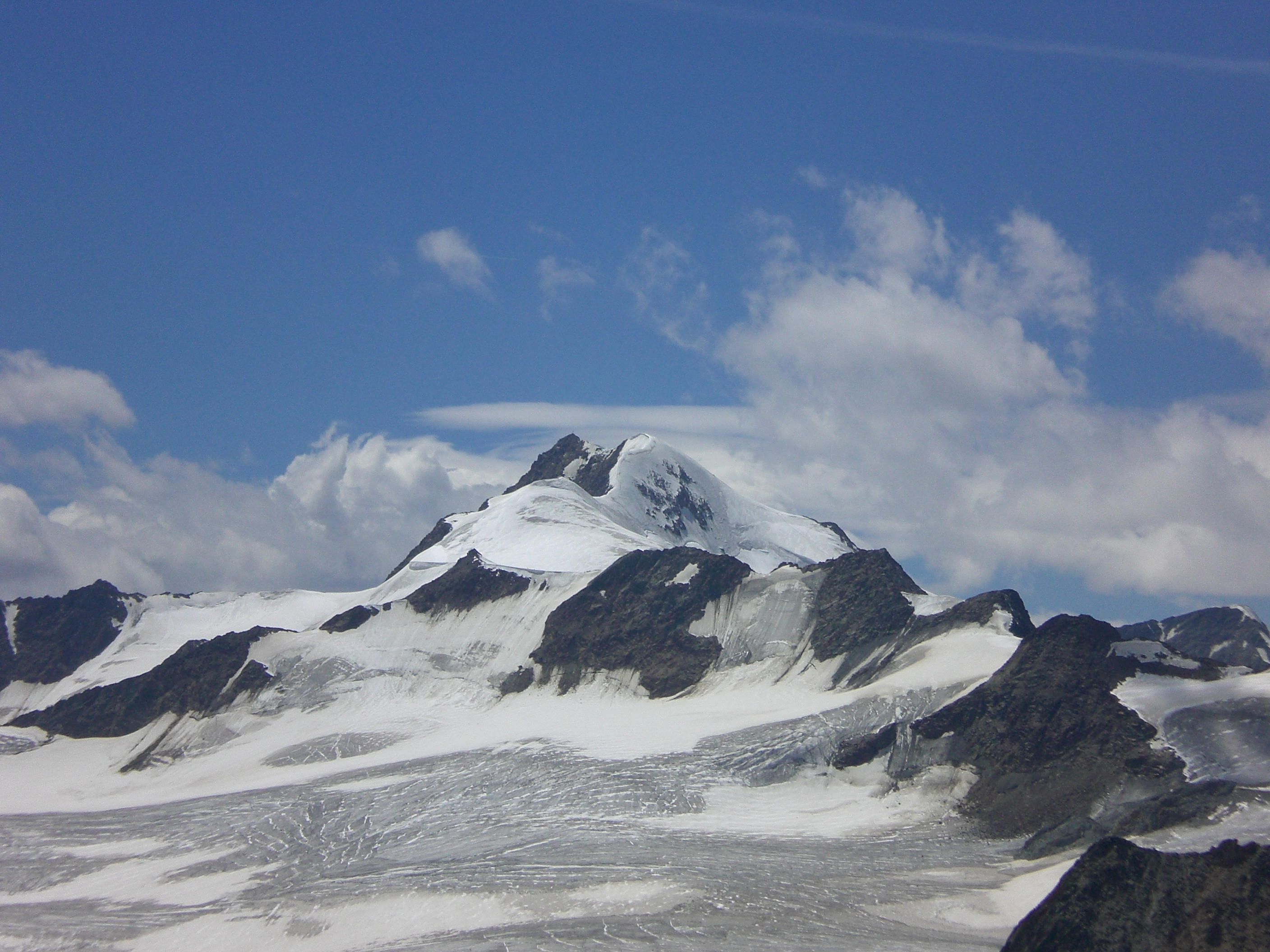
- Wildspitze as seen from the northeast, with the south summit left and the snowy north summit right.

Highest point
- Elevation: 3,770 m (12,370 ft)
- Prominence: 2,261 m (7,418 ft); Ranked 4th in the Alps
- Parent peak: Ortler (Finsteraarhorn)
- Listing: Ultra; Alpine mountains above 3000 m
- Coordinates: 46°53′07″N 10°52′02″E

Geography
- Location within Austria
- Location: North Tyrol, Austria
- Parent range: Ötztal Alps

Climbing
- First ascent: 1848 by Leander Klotz and a fellow local farmer
- Easiest route: basic snow climb

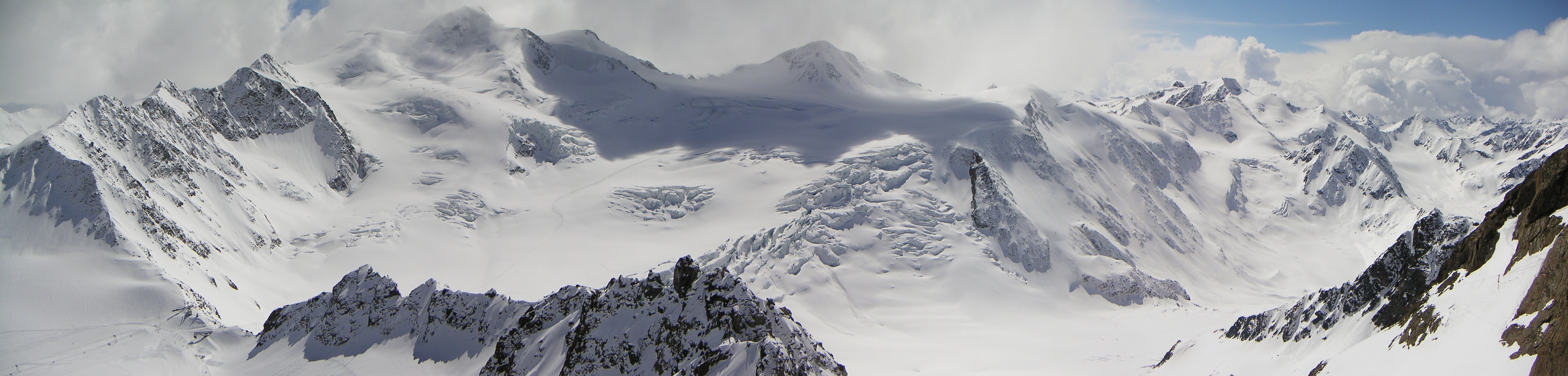
Wildspitze (one third from left) seen from the mountain Hinterer Brunnkogel, the highest point of the Pitztal glacier ski resort. Right beside is the Hinterer Brochkogel, below the Wildspitze lies the glacier Taschachferner. In the lower left corner is the saddle Mittelbergjoch, through which one may access the Taschachferner on the way up.

Wildspitze (German pronunciation: [ˈvɪltˌʃpɪt͡sə]) is the highest mountain in the Ötztal Alps and in North Tyrol, as well as the second highest mountain in Austria after Großglockner and in terms of prominence (2261 m) is the fourth summit of the Alps and the fifteenth of Europe.

== Location ==
The Wildspitze is on a ridge called Weißkamm ("white ridge") that joins the main chain of the Alps at the Weißkugel. Its north and west flanks form the end of the Pitz valley, while the south and east flanks rise above the upper ends of the Ötztal. The mountain has twin peaks, with a rocky south summit (3768 m or by most other sources 3770 m) and a firn-covered north summit at about 3760 m. The mountain is surrounded by glaciers on three sides, of which the Taschachferner (at 8 km^{2}) is the largest. The 50° north face is popular with ice climbers.

The view from the peak is only limited by the curvature of the Earth. To the east one can see as far as the Großglockner and to the west as far as the Finsteraarhorn.

The nearest higher mountain is the Ortler, 48.5 kilometres (30 mi) away in South Tyrol.

== Early ascents ==
The first recorded attempt at the Wildspitze was made in 1847 by Hermann and Adolf Schlagintweit, who probably reached a point at 3,552 m on the north east ridge. The first successful ascent was in 1848 by Leander Klotz, a guide and farmer in the Rofen valley at the foot of the mountain (now part of Sölden), and another, unnamed local farmer. In August 1857, the brothers Nikodem, Leander and Hans Klotz guided Joseph Anton Specht, a merchant from Vienna, to the summit for the second ascent. The northern summit was somewhat higher, at the time measured to be 11,947 Viennese feet or 3,776 m, but the south summit was a better viewpoint and the first two parties had climbed it instead. On August 29, 1861, Nikodem and Leander Klotz guided Anthon von Ruthner and Friedrich R. von Enderes, both from Vienna, to the south summit again. During their hour-long stay on top, Leander traversed to the north peak, which subsequently was considered the first ascent of the main summit of the Wildspitze. However, by the end of the 20th century, snow melt had lowered the northern summit to about 3,765 m, rendering the south summit the highest point and 1848 the year of first ascent.

== Routes ==
The most common route to the top is from the Breslauer Hut, which is approached from the village Vent (1900 m a.s.l.). Most climbers sleep at the hut or in a tent and continue to the summit the next day (about 4 hours from the Breslauerhütte).

An alternative route goes from the Braunschweiger Hut in the Pitztaler glacier area. From the hut the route crosses the glaciers to the Mittelbergjoch (see right image, close to the lower left corner), and then traverses a crevasse-filled area of the Taschachferner glacier to the summit of the Wildspitze. The average time used for this tour is 6.5 hours.

== Climate ==
Wildspitze has a tundra climate (Köppen ET).

Climate data for Pitztaler Gletscher: 2864m (1991−2020)
Month	Jan	Feb	Mar	Apr	May	Jun	Jul	Aug	Sep	Oct	Nov	Dec	Year
Record high °C (°F)	6.0 (42.8)	8.0 (46.4)	7.6 (45.7)	9.0 (48.2)	12.7 (54.9)	17.8 (64.0)	17.5 (63.5)	17.6 (63.7)	16.0 (60.8)	12.7 (54.9)	10.2 (50.4)	6.2 (43.2)	17.8 (64.0)
Mean daily maximum °C (°F)	−4.8 (23.4)	−5.9 (21.4)	−3.6 (25.5)	−1.0 (30.2)	3.0 (37.4)	6.3 (43.3)	8.2 (46.8)	8.7 (47.7)	5.2 (41.4)	2.9 (37.2)	−1.6 (29.1)	−4.3 (24.3)	1.1 (34.0)
Daily mean °C (°F)	−8.7 (16.3)	−9.3 (15.3)	−7.2 (19.0)	−4.4 (24.1)	0.0 (32.0)	3.8 (38.8)	6.0 (42.8)	6.2 (43.2)	2.6 (36.7)	0.1 (32.2)	−4.8 (23.4)	−7.8 (18.0)	−2.0 (28.5)
Mean daily minimum °C (°F)	−11.2 (11.8)	−13.2 (8.2)	−10.4 (13.3)	−7.9 (17.8)	−3.3 (26.1)	0.5 (32.9)	2.4 (36.3)	2.8 (37.0)	−0.4 (31.3)	−2.8 (27.0)	−7.8 (18.0)	−10.7 (12.7)	−5.2 (22.7)
Record low °C (°F)	−27.0 (−16.6)	−29.0 (−20.2)	−26.3 (−15.3)	−23.4 (−10.1)	−17.5 (0.5)	−11.2 (11.8)	−7.0 (19.4)	−10.2 (13.6)	−11.4 (11.5)	−19.4 (−2.9)	−23.0 (−9.4)	−26.3 (−15.3)	−29.0 (−20.2)
Source: Central Institute for Meteorology and Geodynamics

== See also ==
- List of the highest mountains in Austria
