= Weißkugel =

Mountain in Italy

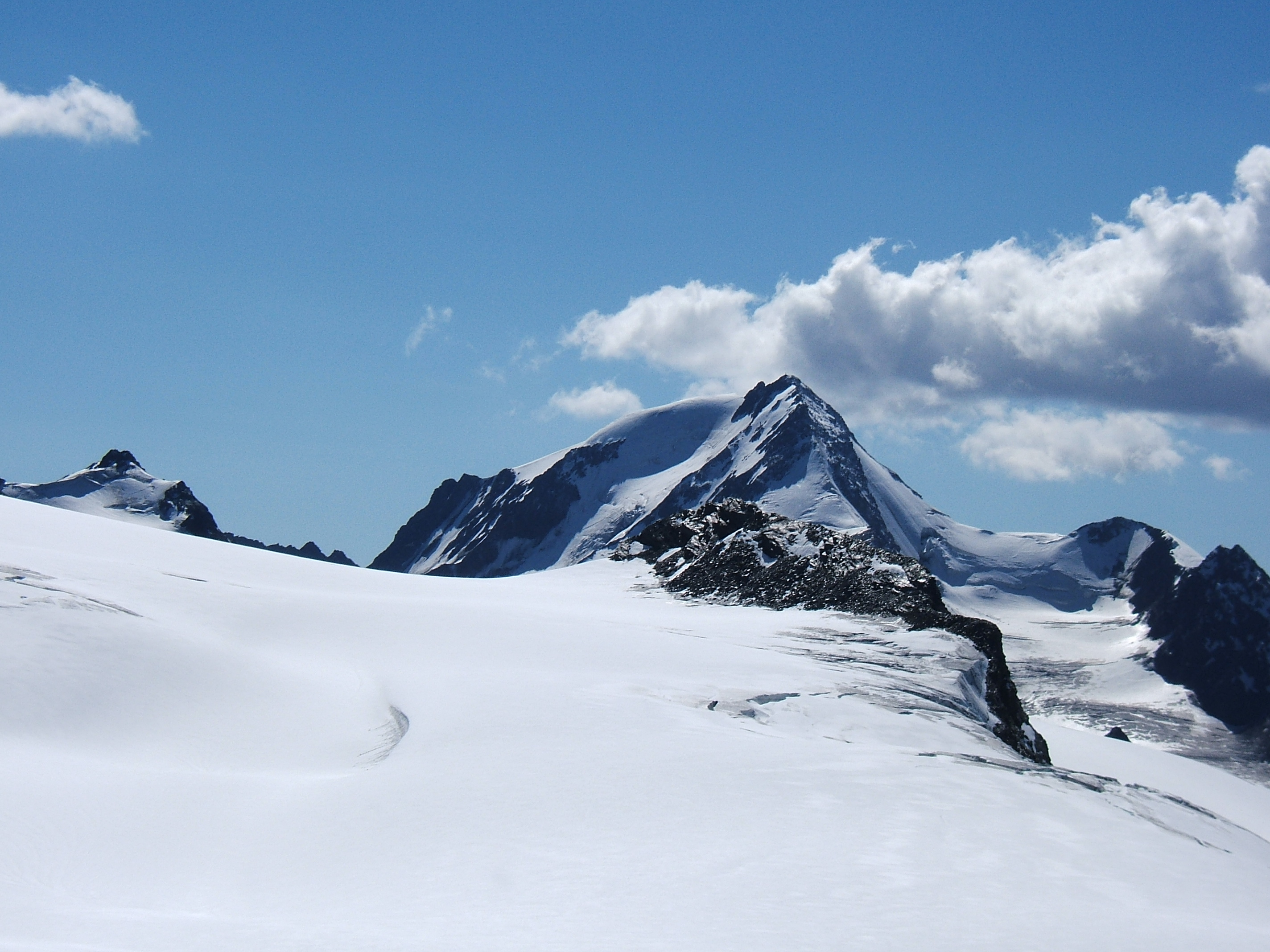

Highest point
- Elevation: 3,739 m (12,267 ft)
- Prominence: 565 m (1,854 ft)
- Parent peak: Wildspitze
- Listing: Alpine mountains above 3000 m
- Coordinates: 46°47′52″N 10°43′35″E

Geography
- Location within Austria
- Location: Tyrol, Austria / South Tyrol, Italy
- Parent range: Ötztal Alps

Climbing
- First ascent: summer of 1845 by Johann Gurschler and Josef Weitthalm, or 30 Sep 1861 by Joseph Anton Specht, Leander Klotz, and Nicodem Klotz (or Johann Raffeiner)
- Easiest route: Glacier ascent over the south ridge

Weißkugel (German pronunciation: [ˈvaɪsˌkuːɡl̩]; Italian: Palla Bianca), or Weißkogel, is the second highest mountain in the Ötztal Alps and the third highest mountain in Austria. Featuring many glaciers, it lies on the border between Austria and Italy. The easiest way to climb it is over its southern side.

The ascent by Joseph Anton Specht from Vienna, guided by Leander and Nicodem Klotz from Vent in 1861, was and is usually considered the first. However, personal notes of Archduke John of Austria about his excursion over the Niederjoch from Vent to Schnals in the summer of 1846, made public in 1903, suggest that his guides, Johann Gurschler and Josef Weitthalm from Schnals, had climbed the mountain the previous summer.

According to the second ascensionist, Douglas Freshfield, it has one of the best views in the Tyrol.

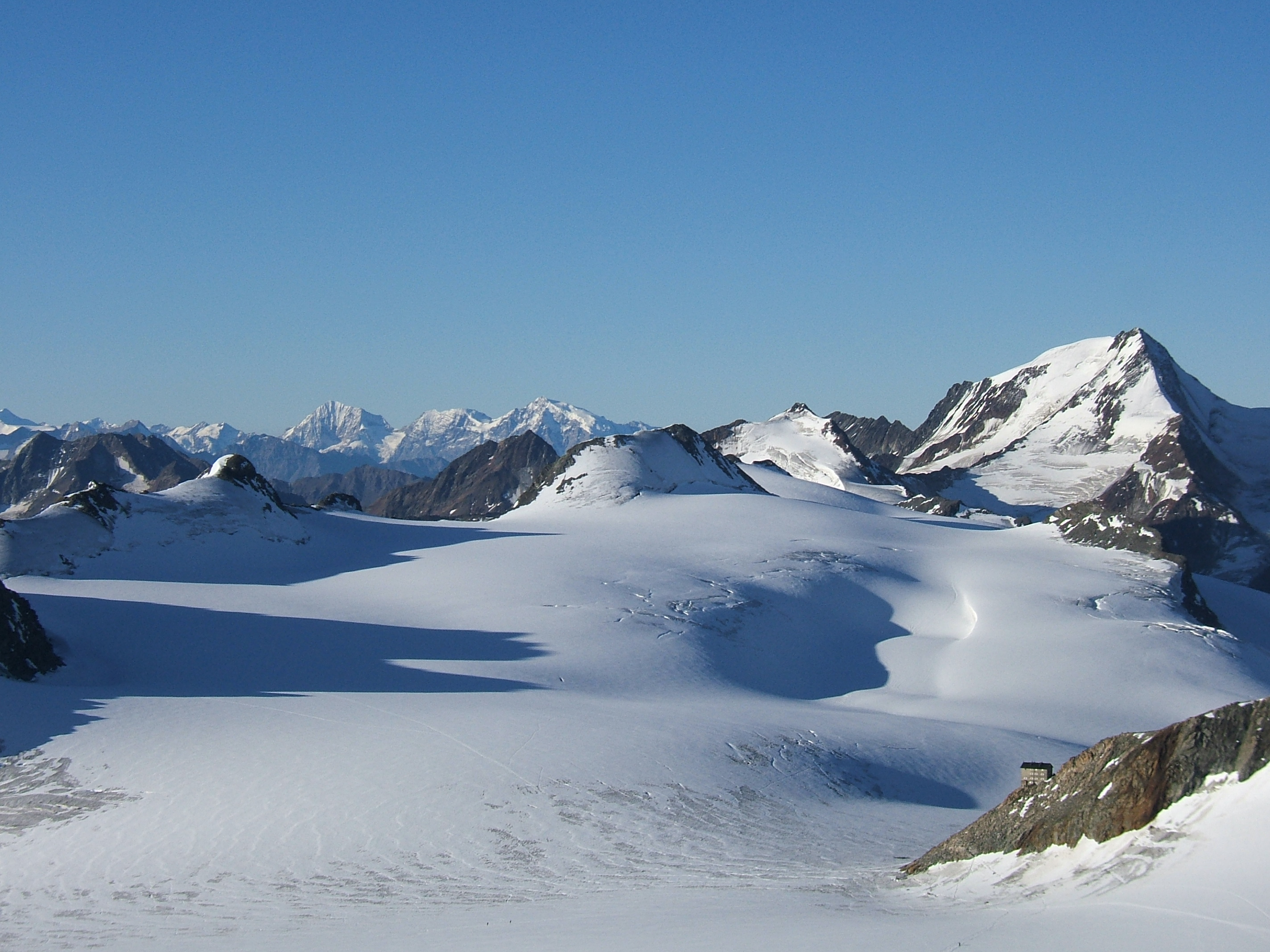
Brandenburger Haus (right foreground) and Weißkugel (right background) as seen from Fluchtkogel over the Gepatsch glacier. In the distance Königspitze, Monte Zebrù, and Ortler

== See also ==
- List of the highest mountains in Austria
