= Ötztal Alps =

Mountain range in Austria and Italy

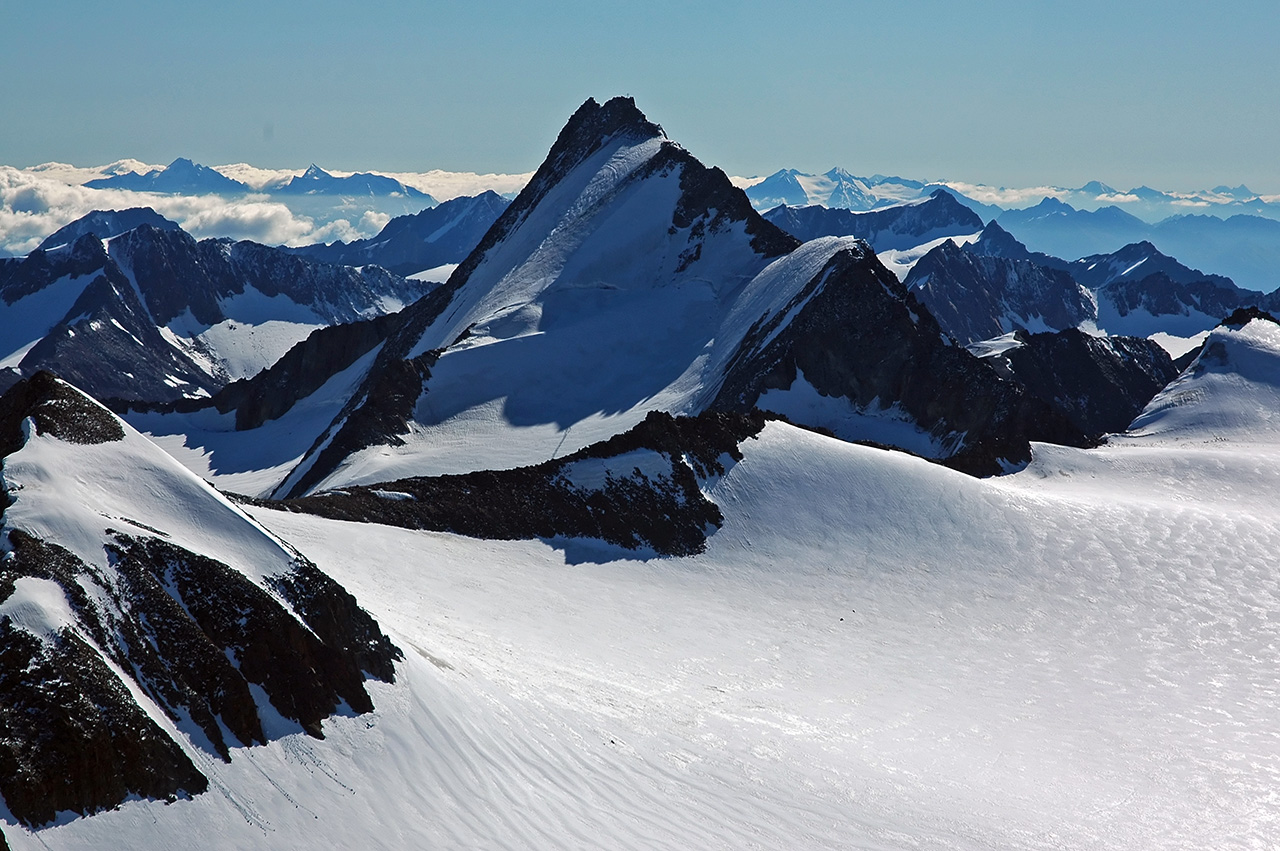
- Hintere Schwärze

Highest point
- Peak: Wildspitze
- Elevation: 3,774 m (12,382 ft)
- Coordinates: 46°53′49″N 10°52′31″E

Geography
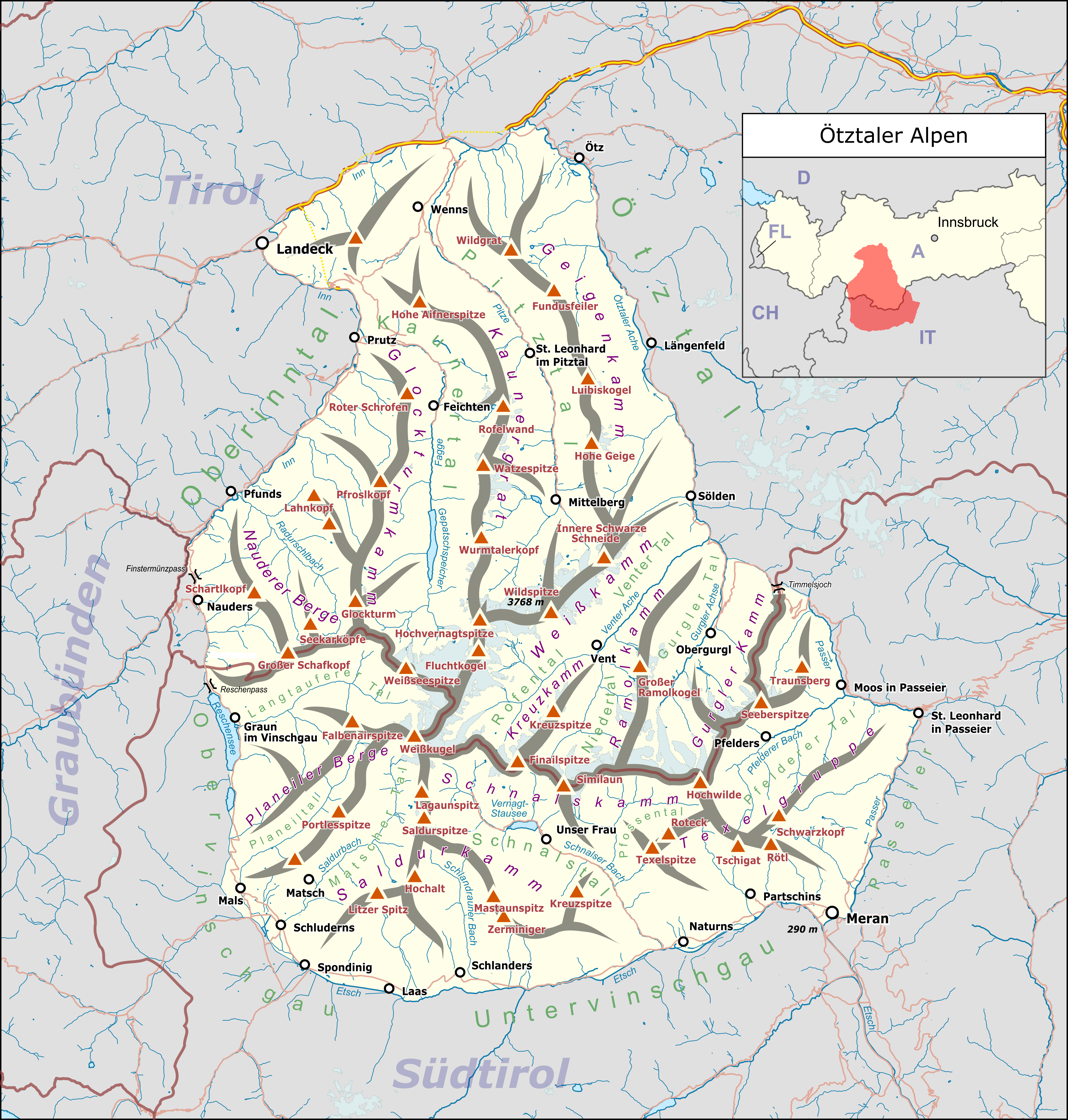
- Ötztal Alps; The borders of the range according to Alpine Club classification of the Eastern Alps
- Countries: Austria; Italy
- Range coordinates: 46°45′N 10°55′E
- Parent range: Central Eastern Alps
- Borders on: Stubai Alps

The Ötztal Alps (Italian: Alpi Venoste, German: Ötztaler Alpen) are a mountain range in the Central Eastern Alps, in the State of Tyrol in western Austria and the Province of South Tyrol in northern Italy.

== Geography ==
The Ötztal Alps are arrayed at the head of the Ötztal valley, a side valley of the Inn river southwest of Innsbruck, Austria. One line of summits forms part of the border between Austria and Italy.

The Ötztal Alps are bordered by the Reschen Pass (1504 m) in the west and the Inn river in the northwest and north. In the east the range is separated from the Stubai Alps by the Ötztaler Ache in the Ötztal, the Timmelsjoch (2474 m) and the Passer river in the Passeier Valley. On the south and southwest, the range is limited by the deep valley of the Etsch river, here known as the Vinschgau.

The Ötztal Alps are surrounded by the following ranges:

- Lechtal Alps
- Mieming Range
- Stubai Alps
- Sarntal Alps
- Ortler Alps
- Sesvenna Alps
- Samnaun Alps

In September 1991, Ötzi the so-called "Iceman" was found on the Hauslabjoch between the peaks Fineilspitze and Similaun.

== Peaks ==
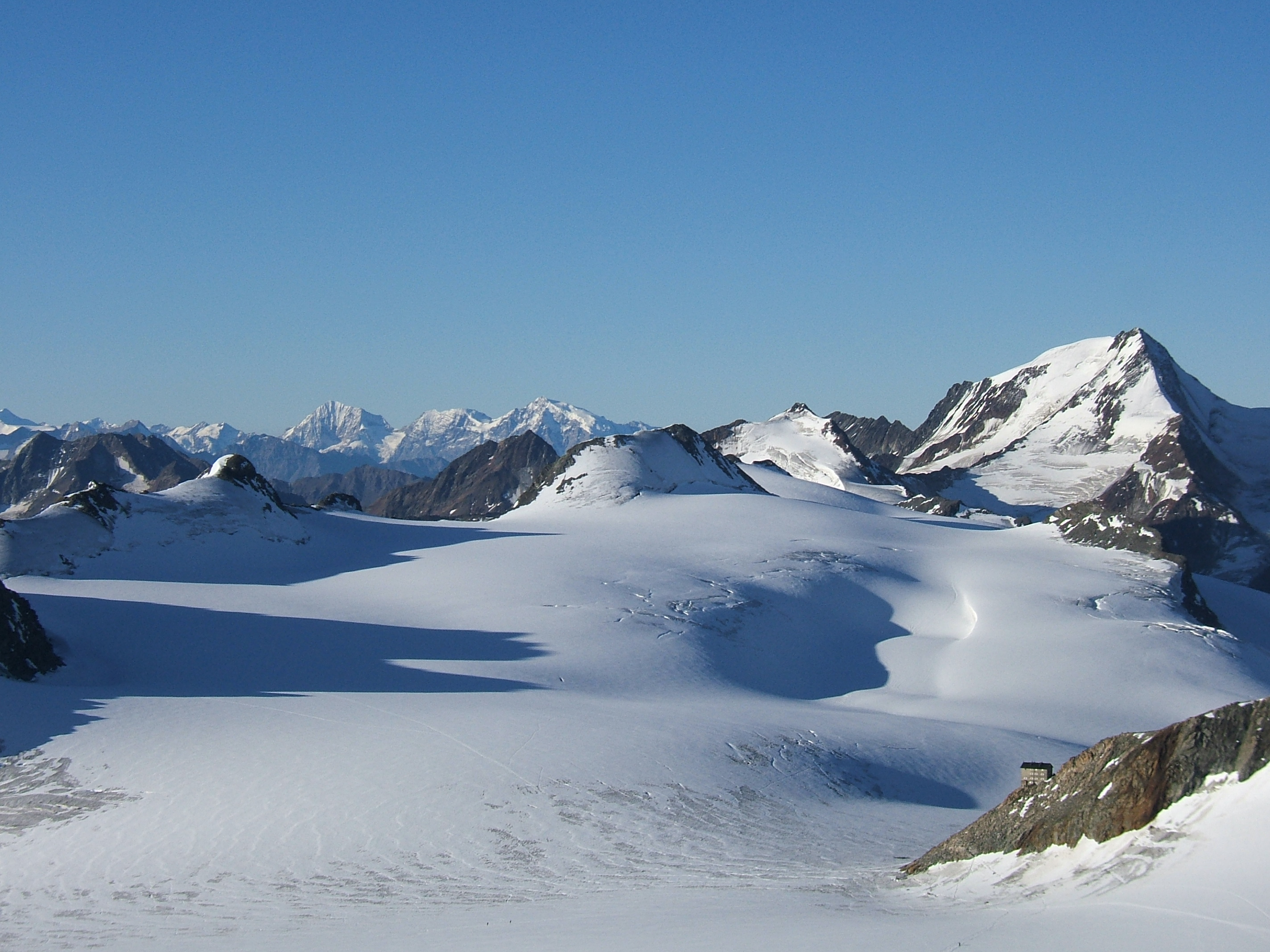
Brandenburger house and Weißkugel

The highest point of the Ötztal Alps is Wildspitze 3,774 metres (12,382 ft), which is also the second highest mountain in Austria (after Großglockner). Wildspitze is on one of several arms that extend north and northeast from the main ridge.

Some of the main peaks of the Ötztal Alps are:

| Peak | Elevation | |
| Peak | m | ft |
|---|---|---|
| Wildspitze | 3,774 | 12,382 |
| Weißkugel | 3,739 | 12,267 |
| Hintere Schwärze | 3,628 | 11,903 |
| Similaun | 3,603 | 11,821 |
| Ramolkogel | 3,551 | 11,651 |
| Schalfkogel | 3,540 | 11,614 |
| Hochvernagtspitze | 3,535 | 11,598 |
| Watzespitze | 3,533 | 11,591 |
| Weißseespitze | 3,518 | 11,542 |
| Fineilspitze | 3,514 | 11,529 |
| Hochwilde | 3,480 | 11,417 |
| Hinterer Seelenkogel | 3,472 | 11,391 |
| Bliggspitze | 3,454 | 11,332 |
| Lagaunspitze | 3,439 | 11,283 |
| Hochfirst | 3,403 | 11,237 |
| Verpeilspitze | 3,425 | 11,165 |
| Ehrichspitze | 3,420 | 11,220 |
| Hohe Geige | 3,395 | 11,138 |
| Valvelspitze | 3,360 | 11,020 |
| Glockturm | 3,355 | 11,007 |
| Rofelewand | 3,353 | 11,001 |
| Hochalt | 3,285 | 10,778 |
| Grawand | 3,251 | 10,666 |
| Remsspitze | 3,205 | 10,515 |
| Nederkogel | 3,163 | 10,377 |
| Hundstalkogel | 3,080 | 10,100 |
| Nauderer Hennesiglspitze | 3,042 | 9,980 |
| Wildnörderer | 3,015 | 9,982 |
| Endkopf | 2,652 | 8,701 |

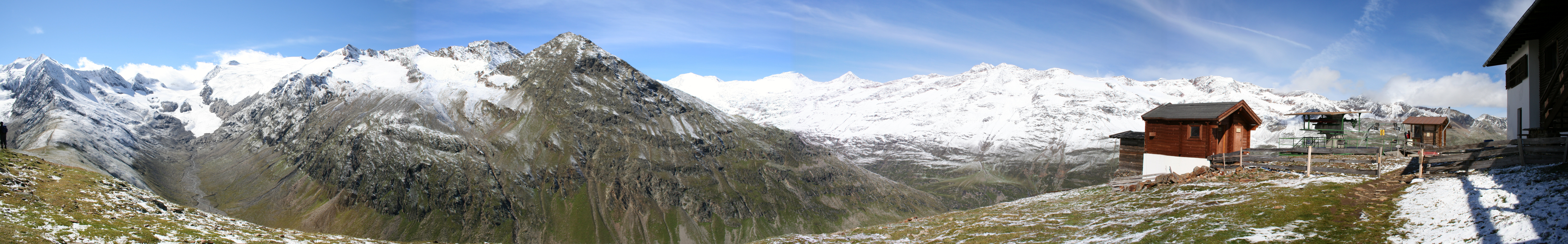
A panorama from Hohe Mut, above Obergurgl.
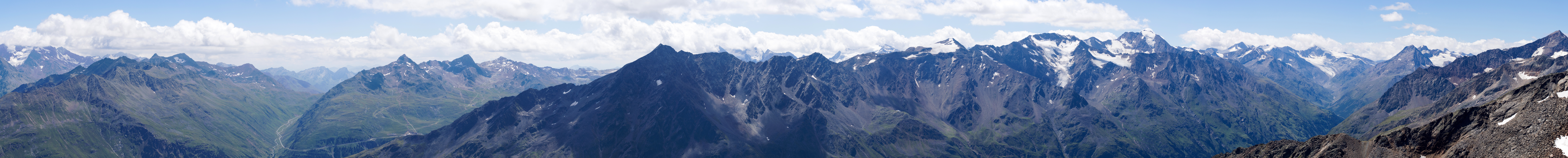
A panorama from the Gaislachkogel, above Sölden, with the Stubaier Alps on the left

== Passes ==
The main mountain passes of the Ötztal Alps are:

| Mountain pass | location | type | elevation (m/ft) | |
|---|---|---|---|---|
| Gepatschjoch | Vent to the Kaunertal | snow | 3243 | 10,640 |
| Ramoljoch | Vent to Gurgl | snow | 3194 | 10,479 |
| Langtaufererjoch | Vent to the Reschen Pass | snow | 3167 | 10,391 |
| Gurgler Eisjoch | Gurgl to Schnals | snow | 3137 | 10,292 |
| Langthalerjoch | Gurgl to Pfelders-Plan | snow | 3058 | 10,033 |
| Niederjoch | Vent to Schnals | snow | 3017 | 9899 |
| Pitztalerjöchl | Mittelberg (Pitztal) to Sölden | snow | 2995 | 9826 |
| Eisjöchl am Bild | Pfelders to Schnals | snow | 2908 | 9541 |
| Venter Hochjoch | Vent to Kurzras | snow | 2885 | 9465 |
| Timmelsjoch (Passo del Rombo) | Sölden to Meran | road | 2509 | 8232 |
| Reschen Pass (Passo di Resia) | Landeck to Meran | road | 1494 | 4902 |

== See also ==
- Banker Kirchenkogel
- Geography of the Alps
