= Ghedina =

Ghedina is an Italian surname. Notable people with the surname include:

- Bruno Ghedina (1943–2021), Italian ice hockey player
- Giuseppe Ghedina (1898–1986), Italian cross country skier
- Guerrino Ghedina (born 1956), Italian Olympic bobsleigh competitor
- Guido Ghedina (1931–1976), Italian Olympic alpine skier
- Kristian Ghedina (born 1969), Italian alpine skier
- Luigi Ghedina (mountain climber) (1924–2009), Italian mountain climber
- Luigi Ghedina (painter) (1829–1900), Italian decorative painter and decorator
- Mario Ghedina (1909–1974), Italian architect
