= Luigi Ghedina =

Luigi Ghedina may refer to:

- Luigi Ghedina (painter)
- Luigi Ghedina (mountain climber)
