= Zanna (disambiguation) =

Zanna may refer to:

- "Zanna", 1984 pop music song by Luc van Acker and Anna Domino
- Zanna (planthopper), a genus of insects
- Zanna (surname), multiple people

It may also refer to:

== Given name ==
- Zanna Hamilton (born 1960), English actress
- Žanna Juškāne (born 1989), Latvian biathlete
- Żanna Niemcowa (born 1984), Russian journalist
- Zanna Proniadou (born 1978), Greek volleyball player
- Zanna Roberts Rassi, British fashion journalist and businesswoman
- Żanna Słoniowska (born 1978), Polish novelist and journalist

== Other uses ==
- Castello de Zanna, a fortress in the southern Alps
- Zanna, fictional character in fantasy novel Un Lun Dun (2007) by China Miéville
- Zanna, fictional character in fantasy novel The Fire Eternal (2007) by Chris D'Lacey
- Zanna, Don't!, a 2003 Off-Broadway musical
