= Forte Tre Sassi =

Historic Austro-Hungarian fortress

Coordinates: 46.5278°N 11.9915°E

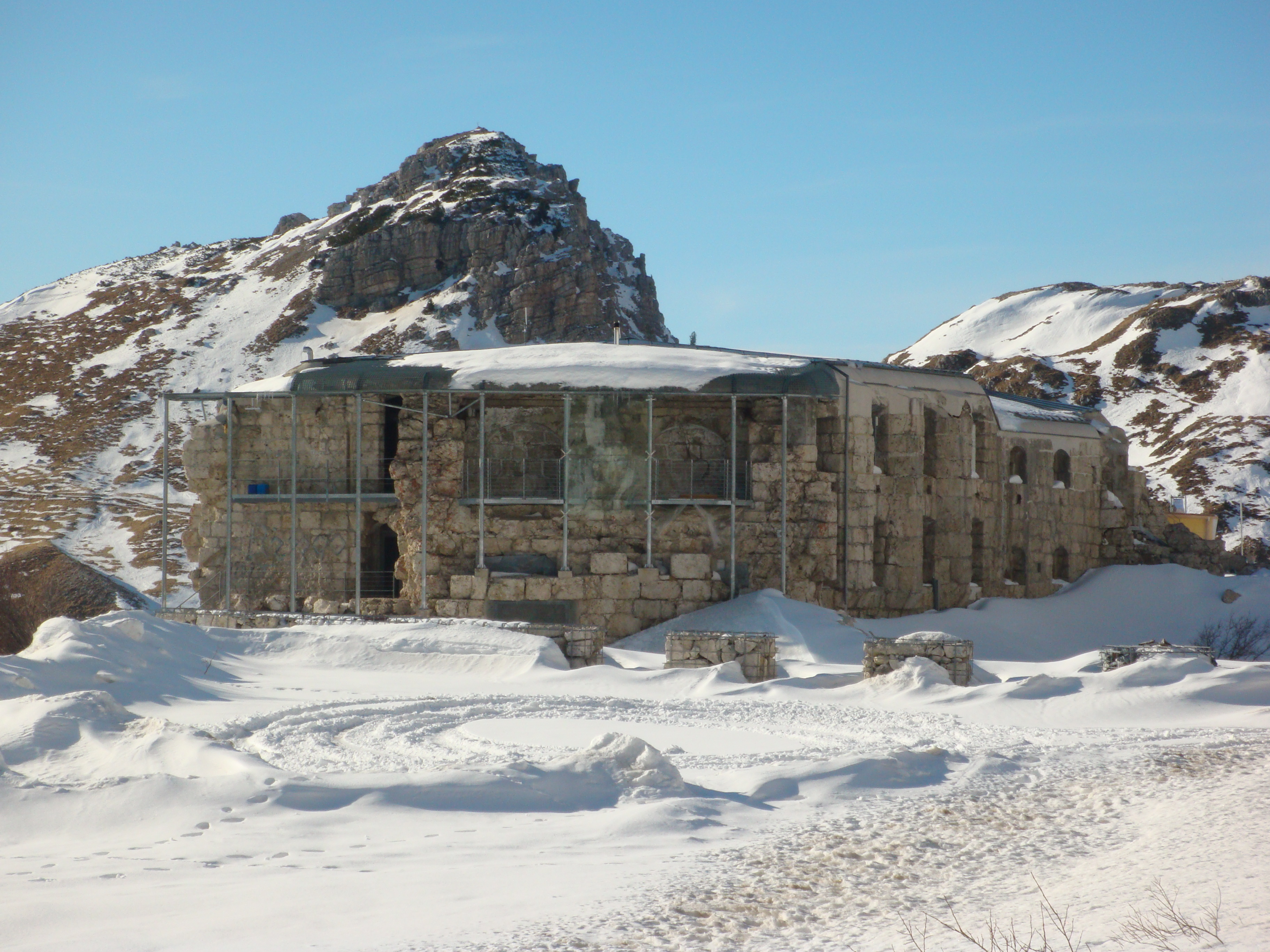
Forte Tre Sassi

Tre Sassi fort (Italian Forte Tre Sassi or Forte Tra i Sassi; Ladino Fort Intra i Sas) is a fortress and museum on the road to the Passo di Valparola, within the comune of Cortina d'Ampezzo in the southern (Dolomitic) Alps of the Veneto region of Northern Italy. Hidden between the Ampezzo valley and the high Val Badia, it was built by Austrians between 1897 and 1901 as a fortification against attack from the Italians on the Falzàrego and Valparo. During World War I it was a favorite target for the Italians, and the fort was destroyed as there was inadequate artillery to defend it.

Forte Tre Sassi is one of three preserved sites which make up the Great War Museum in the Dolomites. The fort houses a museum and an information center.

== History ==
The Forte Tre Sassi is located at an elevation of 2,197 metres (7,208 ft). It was constructed by Austrians in 1897 during the Austro-Hungarian period on the Passo Valparola. Situated between Sass de Stria and Piccolo Lagazuoi, dominating the passage between the Passo Falzarego and Val Badia in South Tyrol (Alto Adige), it was part of the large complex of Austrian fortifications built on the Italian border in the late 19th and early 20th century. Rendered unusable due to a bombing by the Italians on 5 July 1915, the ruins remained in a state of disrepair until the advent of the 21st century, when the fort was restored by the local administration of Ampezzo, with the assistance of the Lancedelli family.

== Museum ==
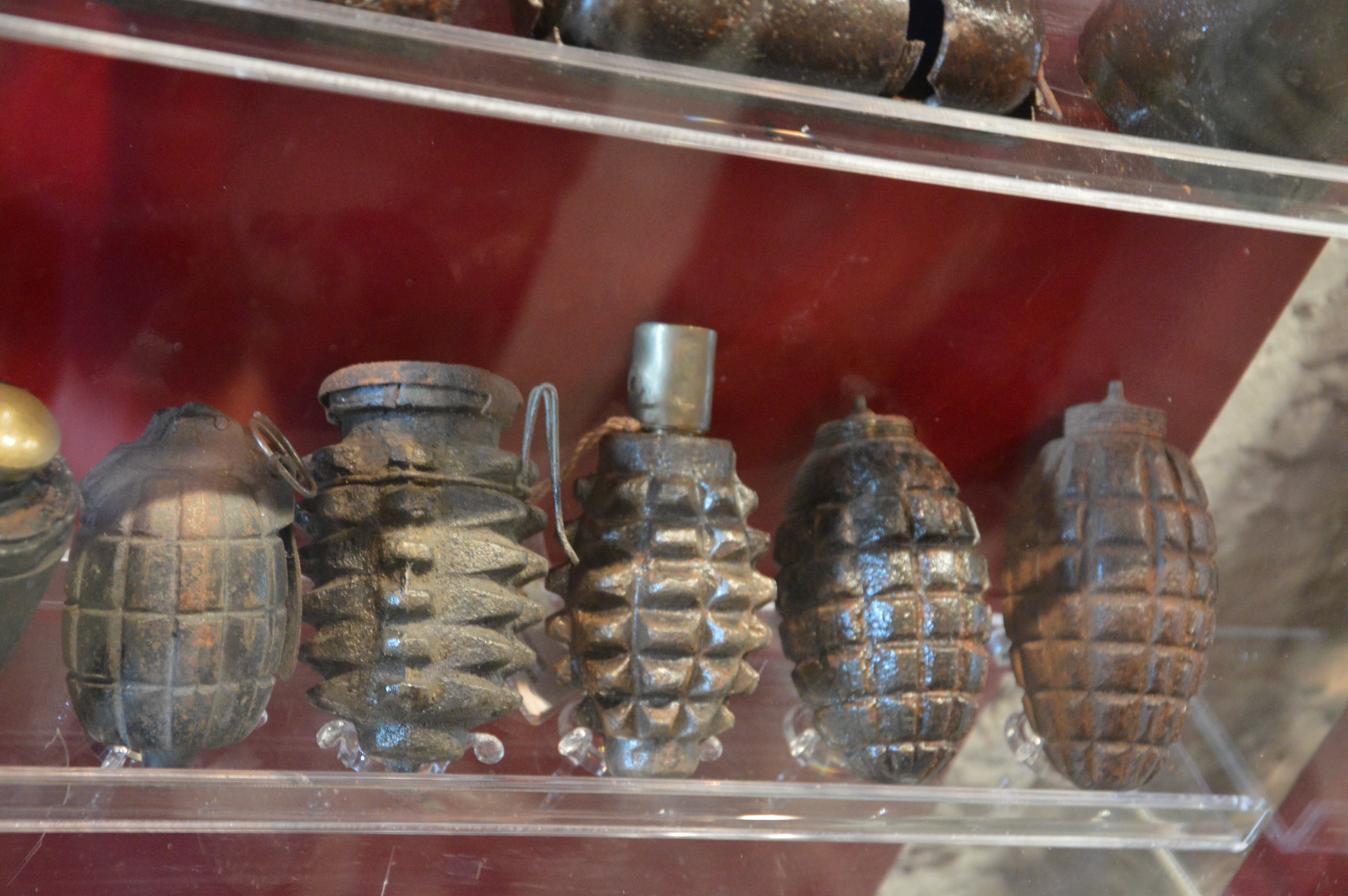
Exhibit of grenades in the museum

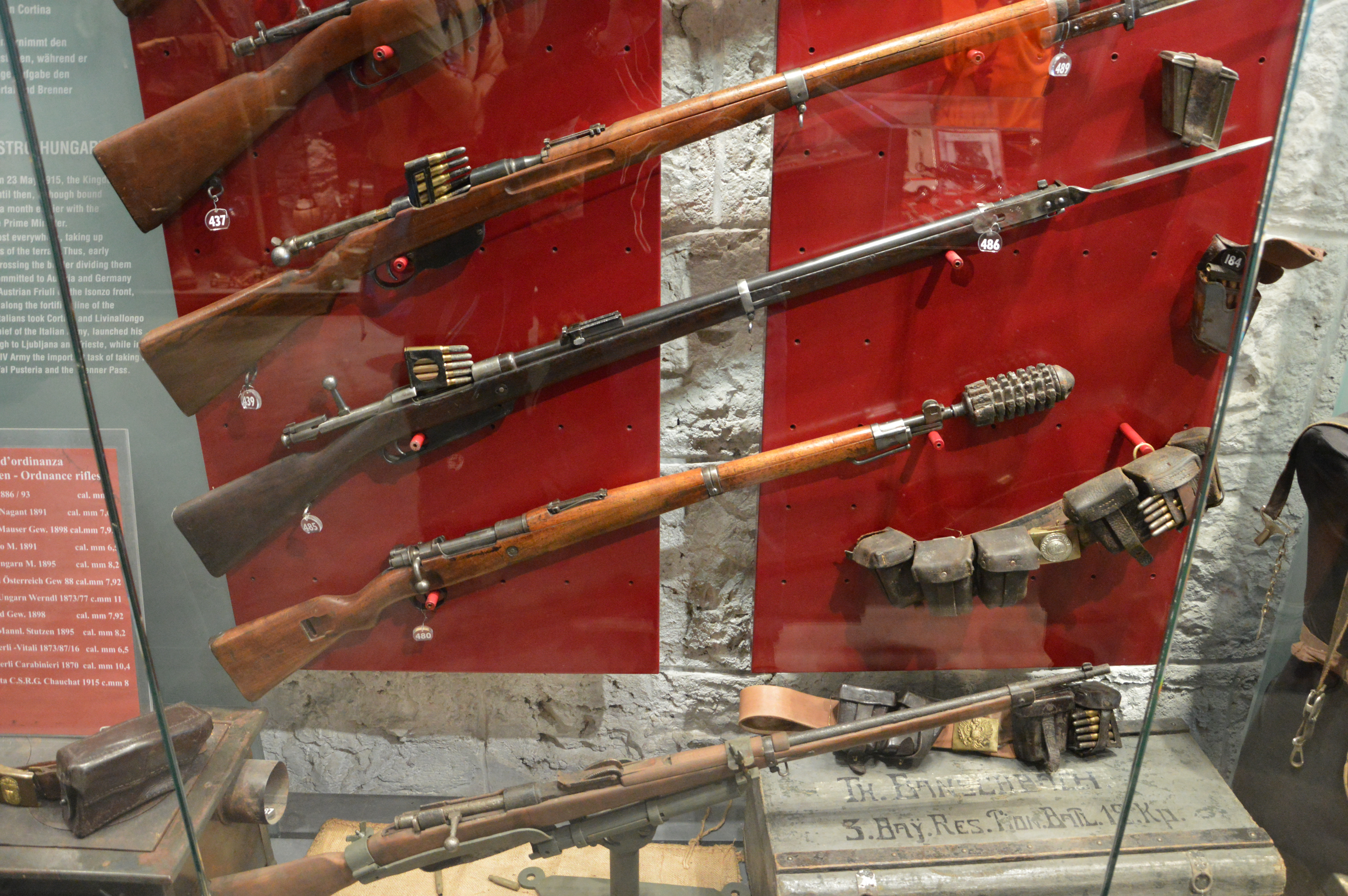
WWI rifles

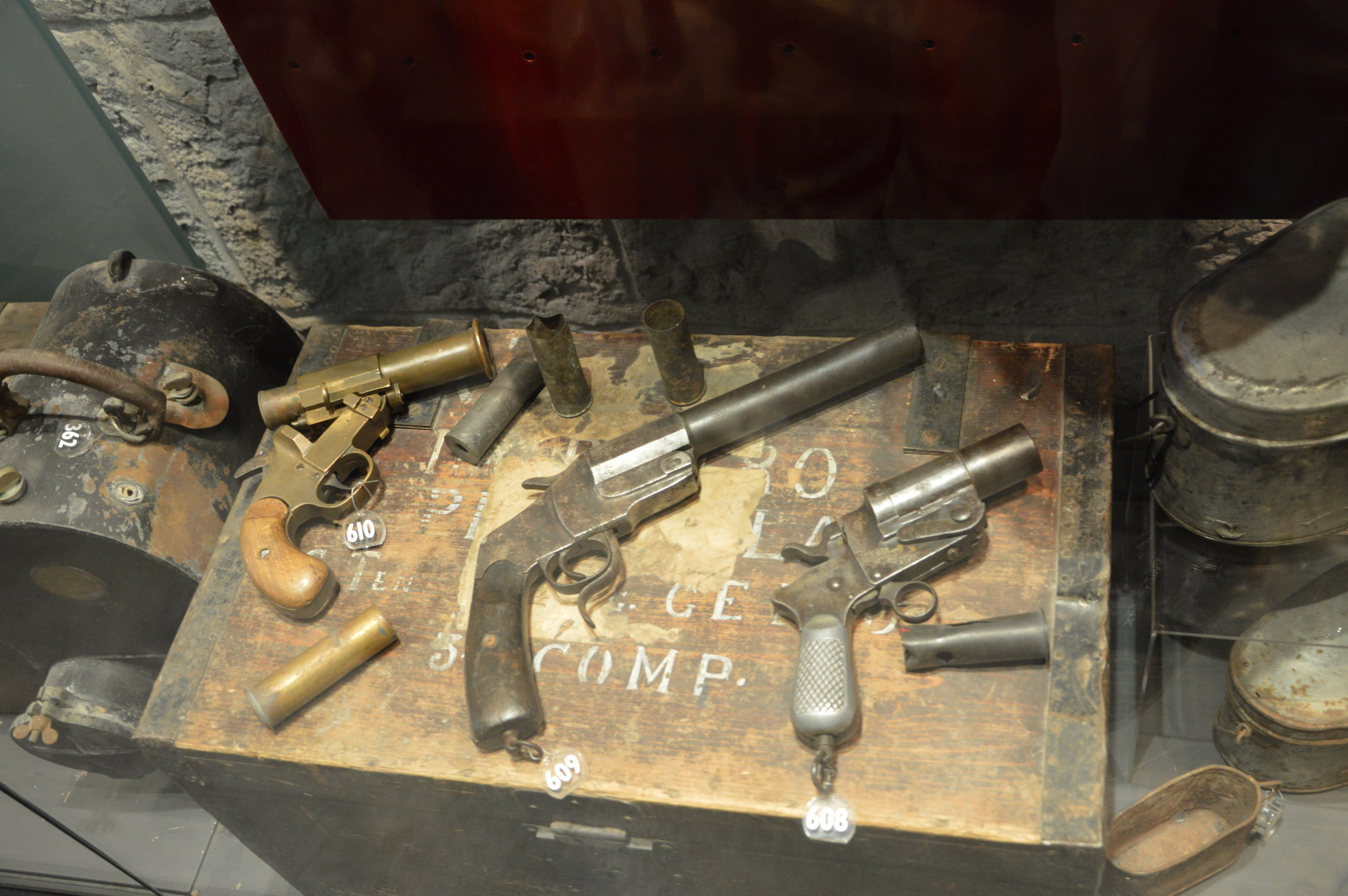
WWI flare pistols

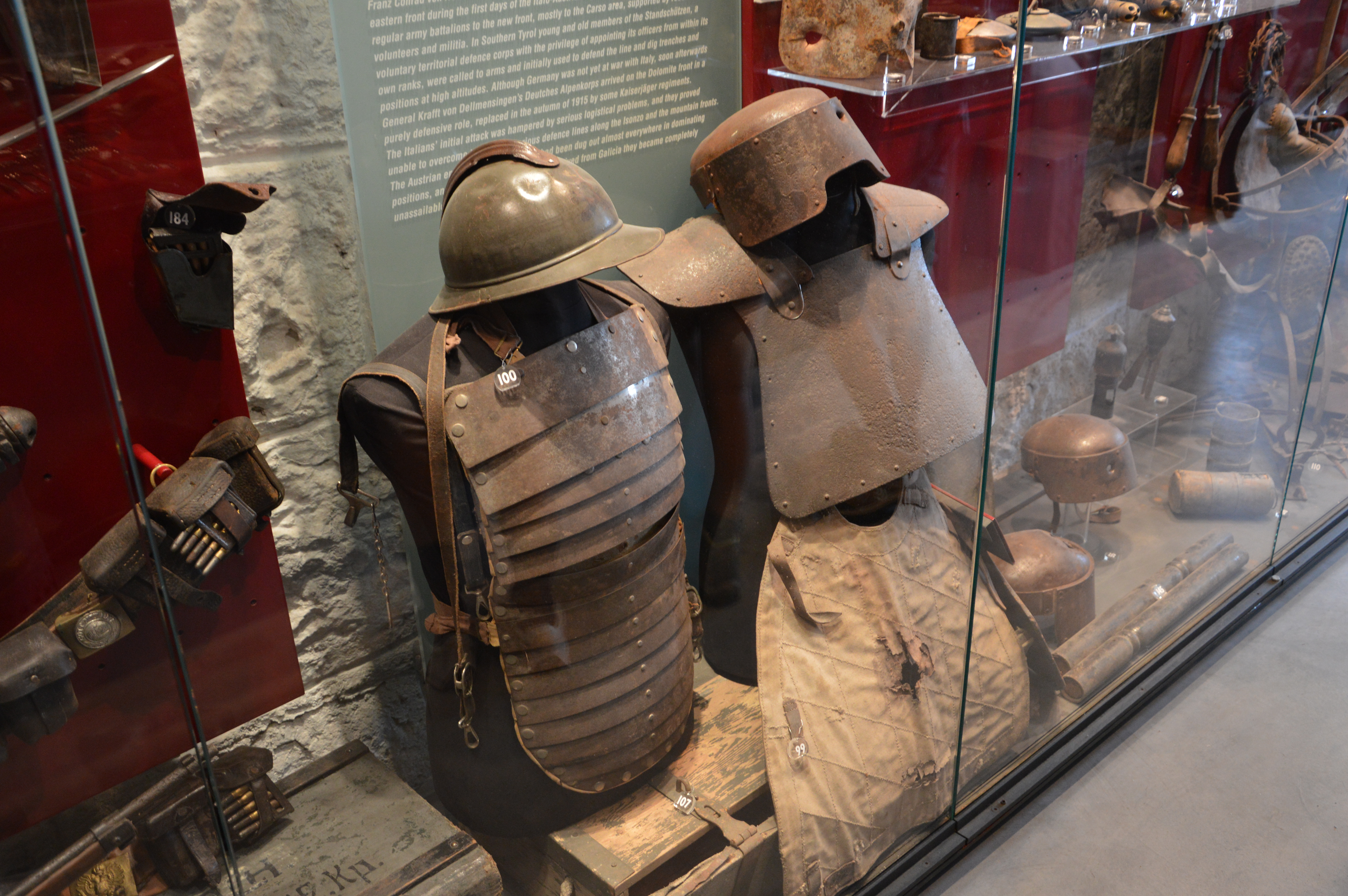
WWI Italian body armor

The fort houses a museum containing relics related to the First World War. The museum was established on 27 September 2002 and opened to the public on 12 August 2003. It houses the historical artifacts of World War I collected by the Lancedelli family and it is also managed by them. A man dressed as a World War I soldier stands guard outside the facility. The exhibits were collected over a period of 45 years and the museum is reported to have an attendance of 20,000 visitors a year. Army barracks and trenches have been recreated near the museum and a snowshoeing tour enables visitors to appreciate what life was like in the trenches in winter.

== Bibliography ==
- Dana, Krista (2007). The Alps. Hunter Publishing, Inc. ISBN 978-1-58843-649-8.
- DK Publishing (1 May 2014). Eyewitness Travel Family Guide Italy. DK Publishing. ISBN 978-1-4654-2782-3.
- Italiano, Touring Club (2004). Belluno e provincia. Touring Editore. ISBN 978-88-365-3135-6.
- Padovan, Gianluca (2005). Archeologia Del Sottosuolo: Lettura e Studio Delle Cavitā Artificiali. John and Erica Hedges Limited. ISBN 978-1-84171-716-6.
- Price, Gillian (9 September 2010). Shorter Walks in the Dolomites: 40 Selected Walks. Cicerone Press Limited. ISBN 978-1-84965-019-9.
- Vianelli, Mario; Cenacchi, Giovanni (2006). Teatri di guerra sulle Dolomiti: 1915–1917, guida ai campi di battaglia. Oscar Mondadori. ISBN 978-88-04-55565-0.
- Wachtler, Michael; Obwegs, Günther (2004). Dolomiti: guerra, dolore e morte. Athesia Spectrum. ISBN 978-88-87272-65-9.
