= Cappella della Beata Vergine di Lourdes =

Roman Catholic chapel in Cortina d'Ampezzo's Grava di Sotto neighborhood

Coordinates: 46.5461°N 12.1415°E

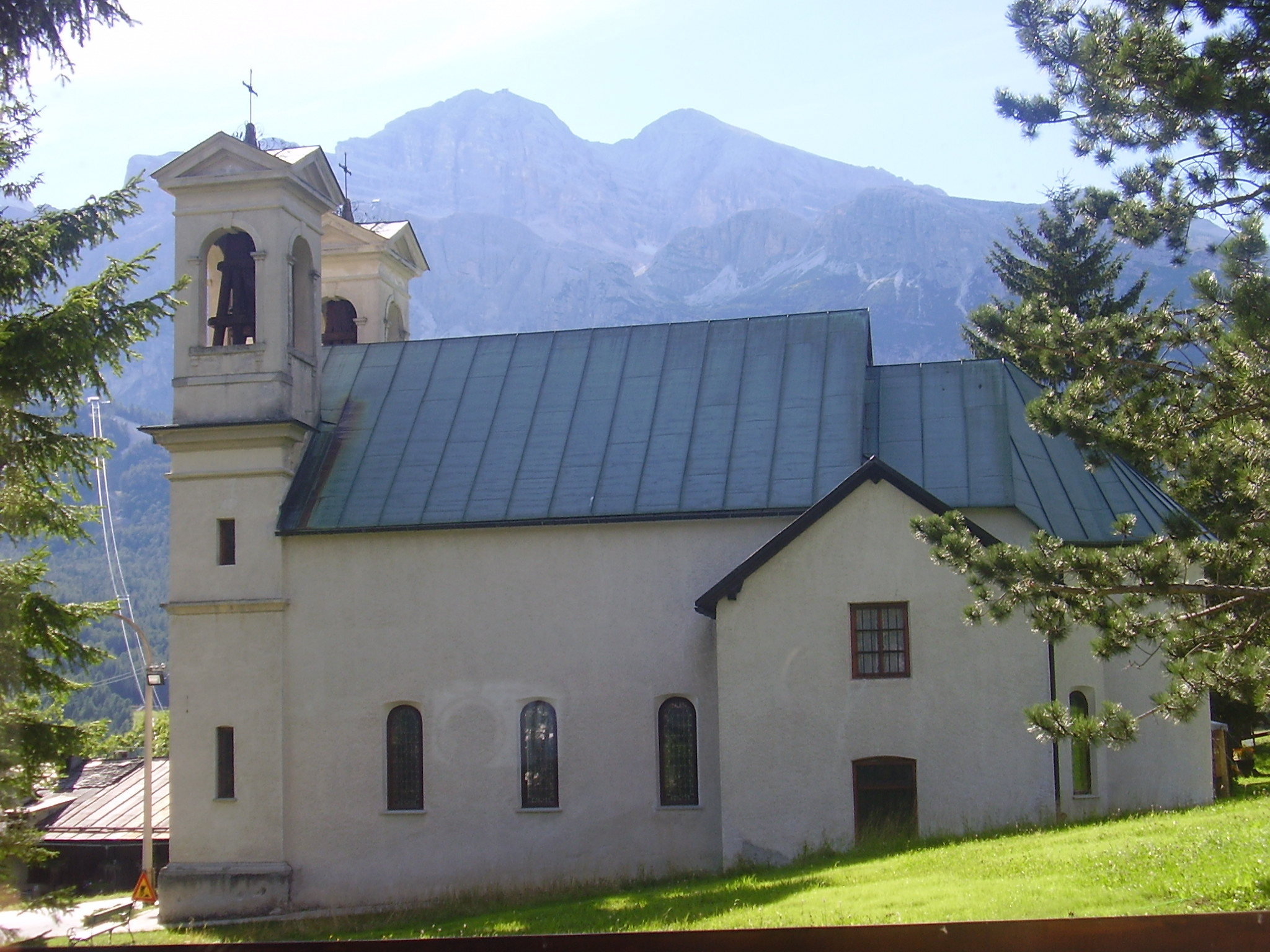
Cappella della Beata Vergine di Lourdes

Cappella della Beata Vergine di Lourdes (Chapel of Our Lady of Lourdes; also known as Chiesetta di Grava) is a Roman Catholic chapel located in Cortina d'Ampezzo's Grava di Sotto neighborhood. Built in 1907, it contains elements by the artist Corrado Pitscheider of the Val Gardena. Its feast day is celebrated on 11 February. The interior features a spacious nave, an altar, and the Lourdes grotto. The space is lit by large windows. There are statues of the Virgin and Santa Bernadette, as well as St. Lucia and St. Michael the Archangel. A framed canvas of St. Joseph with the Child hangs in the presbytery.

== Gallery ==
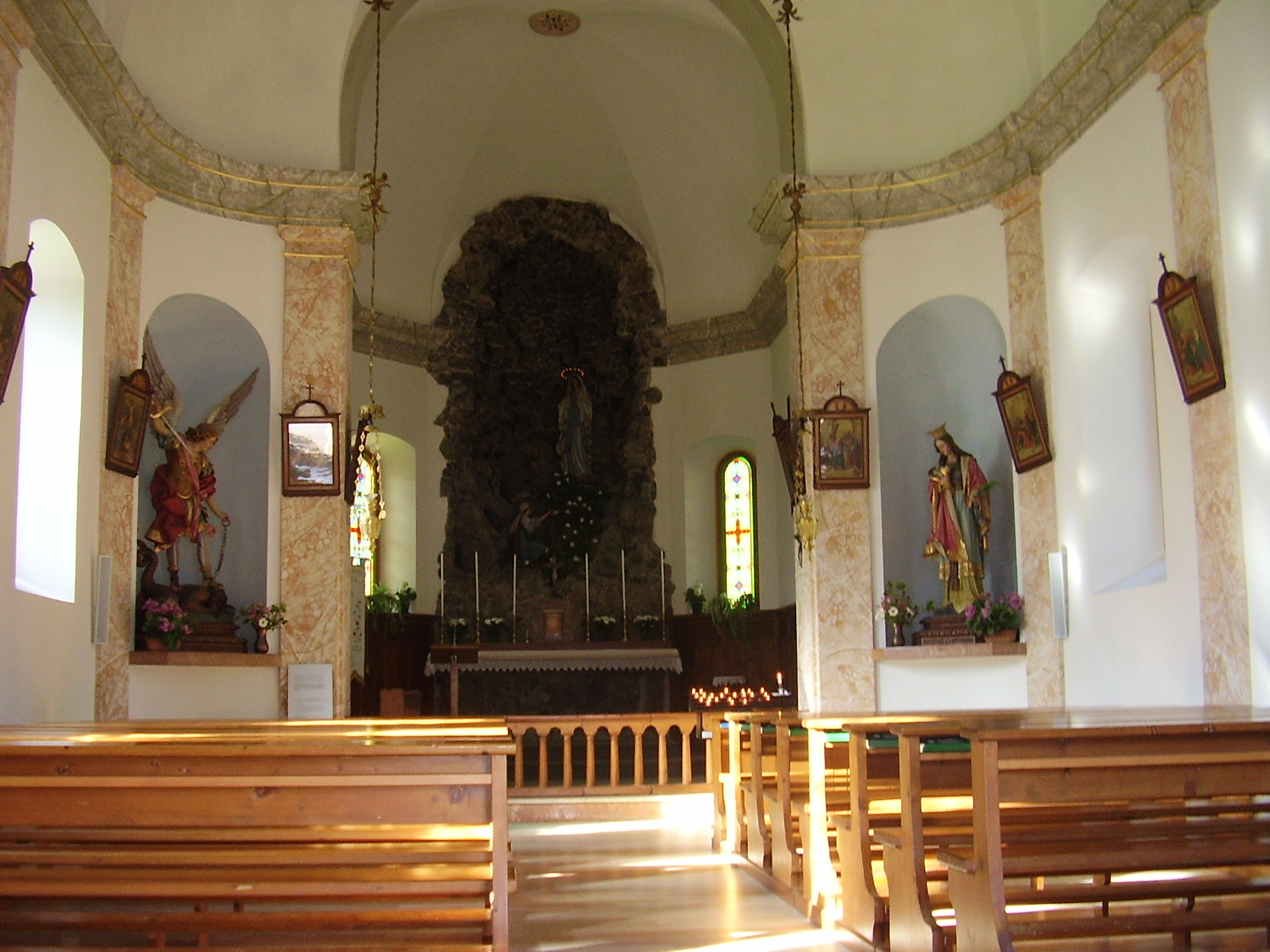
Interior view

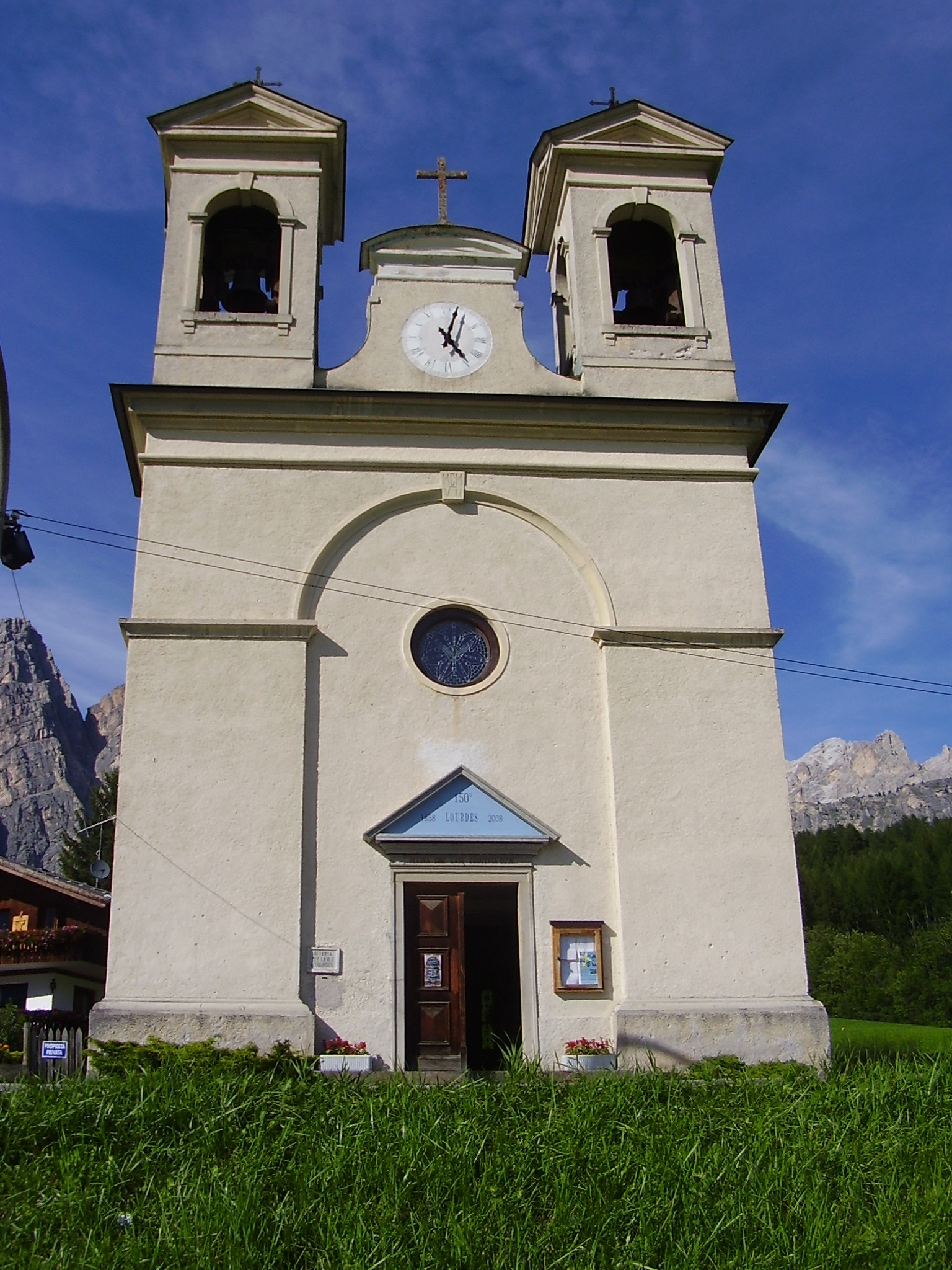
Exterior view
