= Cortina d'Ampezzo =

Town and comune in Veneto, Italy

Cortina d'Ampezzo Anpezo (Ladin)
- Comune
- Comune di Cortina d'Ampezzo/Comun de Anpezo
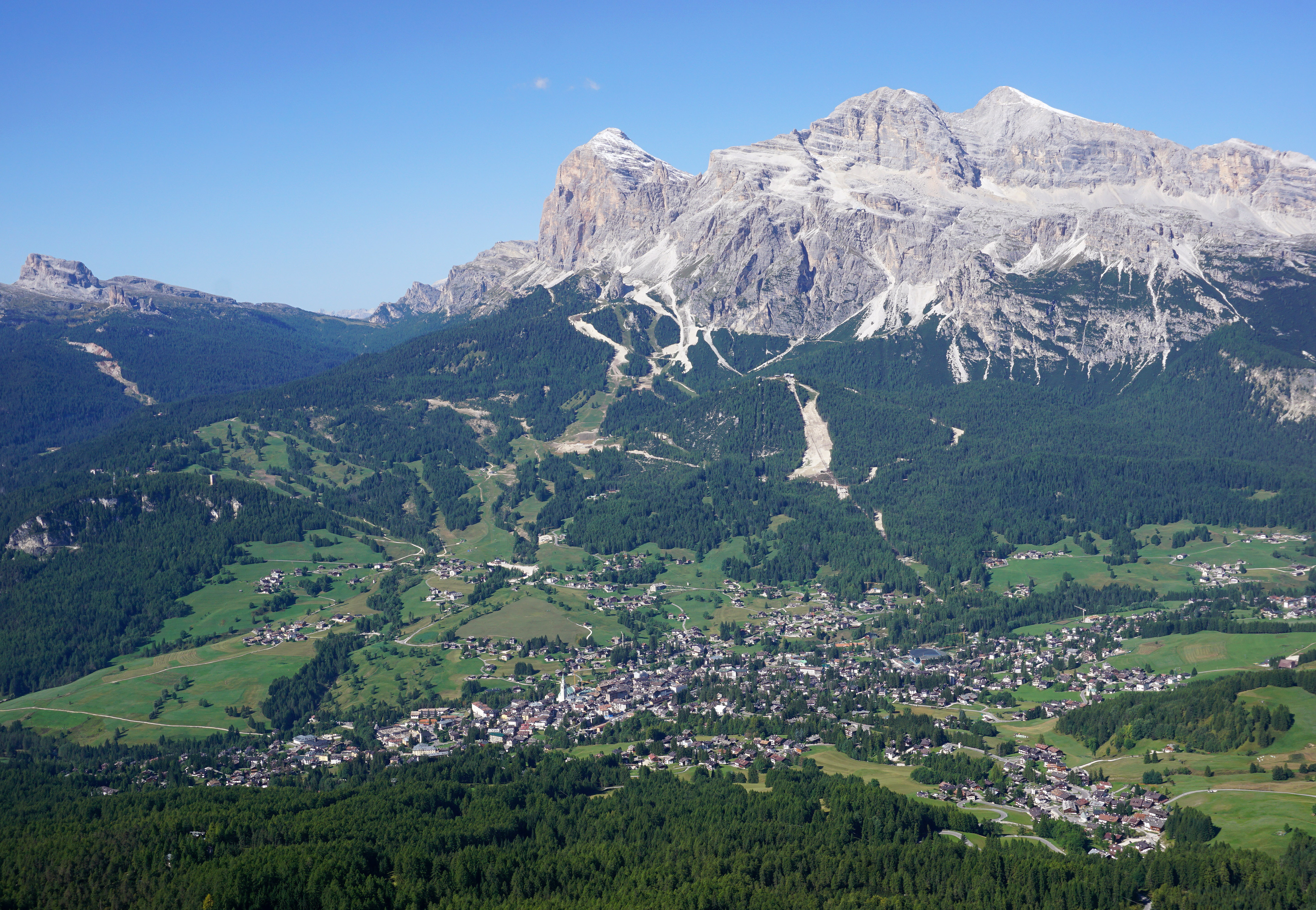
- View of Cortina d'Ampezzo

- Flag Coat of arms

- The Comune of Cortina d'Ampezzo shaded red in the Province of Belluno

- Location within Italy Location within Veneto
- Coordinates: 46°32′25″N 12°08′10″E
- Country: Italy
- Region: Veneto
- Province: Belluno (BL)
- Frazioni: see list

Government
  - Mayor: Gianluca Lorenzi

Area
  - Total: 254.51 km^{2} (98.27 sq mi)
- Elevation: 1,224 m (4,016 ft)

Population (30 November 2025)
  - Total: 5,396
  - Density: 21.20/km^{2} (54.91/sq mi)
- Demonym(s): Italian: ampezzani Ampezzan: anpezan
- Time zone: UTC+1 (CET)
  - Summer (DST): UTC+2 (CEST)
- Postal code: 32043
- Dialing code: 0436
- Patron saint: St. Philip and James
- Saint day: 3 May
- Website: Official website (in Italian)

Cortina d'Ampezzo (Italian: [korˈtiːna damˈpɛttso]; local Ladin: Anpezo, elsewhere Ampëz; historical Austrian German: Hayden), often abbreviated to Cortina, is a town and comune (municipality) in the province of Belluno, in the Veneto region of Northern Italy. Situated on the Boite river, in an alpine valley in the heart of the southern Dolomitic Alps, it is an upscale summer and winter sport resort known for its skiing trails, scenery, accommodation, shops and its jet-set-dominated après-ski scene. It is part of the linguistic and cultural region of Ladinia. The town's Latin motto, granted in 1928 on its flag and coat of arms, reads: MODO VIVO AC TUTA QUIESCO (roughly, "I live frugally and rest quietly".)

During the Middle Ages, Cortina d'Ampezzo fell under the jurisdiction of the Patriarchate of Aquileia and the Holy Roman Empire. In 1420 it was conquered by the Republic of Venice. From 1508, it then spent much of its history under Habsburg rule, briefly undergoing some territorial changes under Napoleon, before being returned to the Austrian Empire (later Austria-Hungary), which held it until 1918. From the 19th century, Cortina d'Ampezzo became a regional centre for crafts. The local handmade products were appreciated by early British and German holidaymakers as tourism emerged in the late 19th century. Among the specializations of the town were crafting wood for furniture, the production of tiled stoves, and iron, copper and glass items.

Today, the local economy thrives on tourism, particularly during the winter season, when the population of the town typically increases from about 7,000 to 40,000. The Basilica Minore dei Santi Filippo e Giacomo was built between 1769 and 1775 on the site of two former 13th- and 16th-century churches; it is home to the parish and the deanery of Cortina d'Ampezzo. The town also contains the Rinaldo Zardini Palaeontology Museum, the Mario Rimoldi Modern Art Museum, and the Regole of Ampezzo Ethnographic Museum.

Although Cortina d'Ampezzo was unable to go ahead with the scheduled 1944 Winter Olympics because of World War II, it hosted the Winter Olympics in 1956 and subsequently hosted a number of world winter-sports events. In 2026, Cortina d'Ampezzo hosted the Winter Olympics for a second time, co-hosting with Milan. The town is home to SG Cortina, a top league professional ice hockey team, and is also the start and end point of the annual Dolomites Gold Cup Race.

Several films have been shot in the town, most notably The Pink Panther (1963), For Your Eyes Only (1981), and Cliffhanger (1993).

== History ==
=== Prehistory ===
The discovery in 1987 of a primitive tomb at Mondeval de Sora high up in the mountains to the south of Cortina testifies to the presence of Mesolithic humans in the area as far back as the 6th millennium B.C. In the 6th century B.C., Etruscan writing was introduced in the province of Cadore, in whose possession it remained until the early 5th century. From the 3rd century B.C., the Romans assimilated the Raeti and Veneti people, giving the area the name of Amplitium (from amplus meaning 'wide'), today's Ampezzo.

=== Middle Ages to 19th century ===
No historical information exists on the Cadore region from the fall of the Roman Empire until the Lombard period. It is assumed that during the Barbarian invasions, the inhabitants fled to the Fassa, Badia, Cordevole and Ampezzo valleys.

In the Middle Ages, Ampezzo fell under the jurisdiction of the Patriarchate of Aquileia and of the Holy Roman Empire. In 1420, the village was conquered by the Republic of Venice. In 1508 it was conquered by the Habsburgs, and by 1511 people of Ampezzo swore loyalty to the Emperor Maximilian, and that area was subsequently adjoined to the region of Pusterthal.

In 1797, when the Treaty of Campo Formio was signed, Napoleon initially permitted the Habsburg Empire to retain it, but in 1810 he added Ampezzo to the Department of Piave, following an attack on the town in which it was burned by the French. In 1813, the Austrian Empire reclaimed it, and it remained in its possession even after the battles of Custoza and Sadowa in 1866 when Venice was ceded to Italy. The town gained a reputation as a health resort; it was reportedly free of diseases such as cholera.

In 1874, the Ampezzo forest became the property of the Carnic Woods Consortium. Although remaining an Austrian possession until 1920 (as a part of kronland Tyrol), aside from being home for an ethnic German-speaking minority, Ampezzo never became a German-speaking territory and conserved its original language Ladin, a Rhaeto-Romance language.

=== 20th century ===
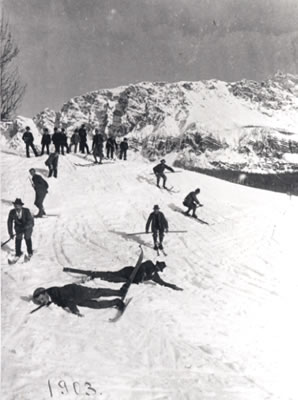
Skiers in Cortina, 1903

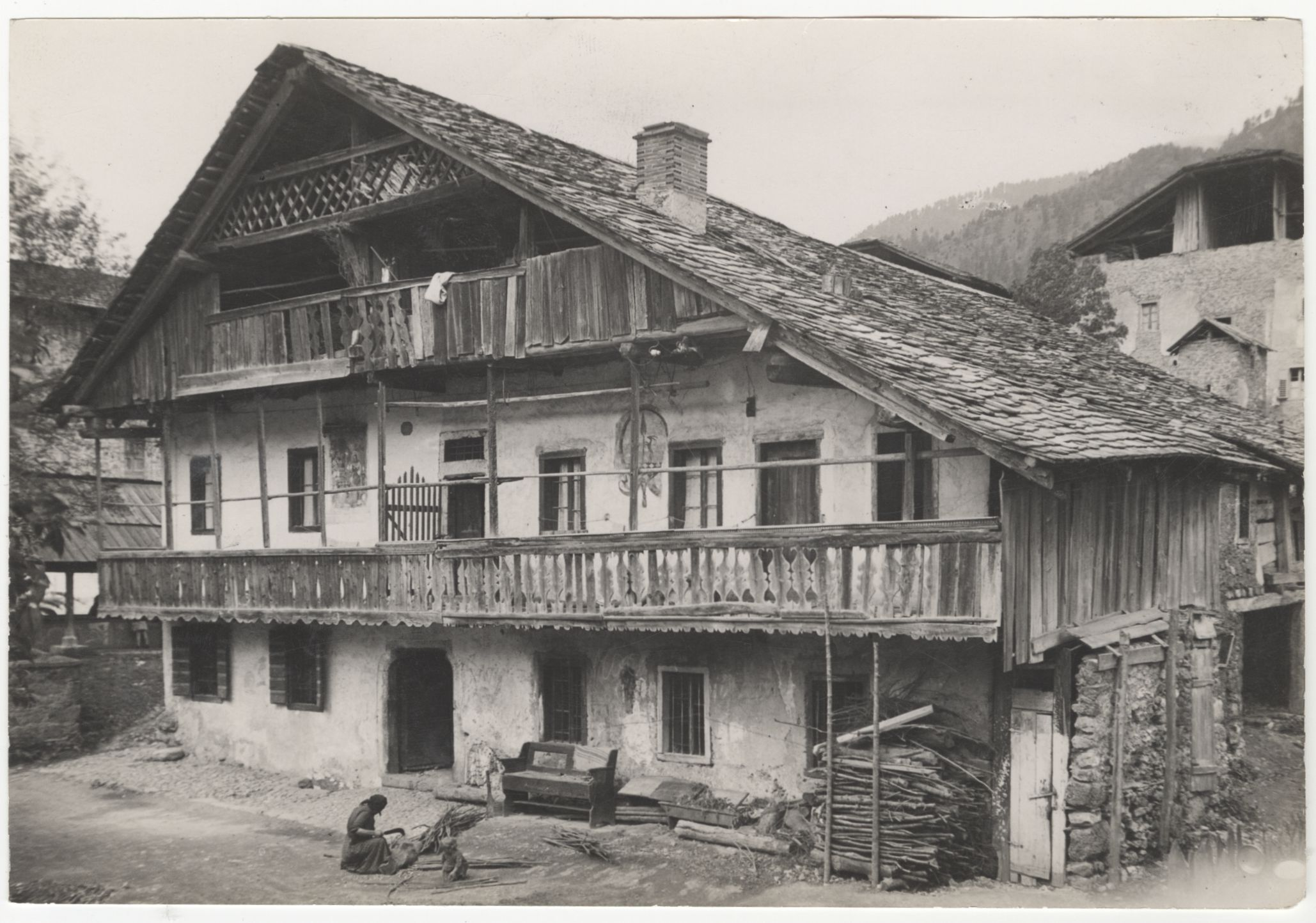
A rural building in Cortina d'Ampezzo, 1952

When Italy entered World War I in 1915, most of the male inhabitants were fighting for Austria-Hungary on the Russian front. 669 male inhabitants (most of them under 16 or over 50) tried to fight the Italian troops. Outnumbered by the Italians, they had to retreat. After the Austrian recovery in 1917, the town was occupied again by the Tyrolean Standschützen.

Following Italy's victory in World War I, in 1920 Ampezzo was definitively ceded to Italy. together with the central and southern part of Tyrol. In 1923, it was separated from Tyrol, along with Colle Santa Lucia and Livinallongo del Col di Lana and incorporated into the province of Belluno, itself part of the Veneto region.

After World War I the city was renamed "Cortina d'Ampezzo" (Curtain of the Ampezzo Valley), adopting the name of one of the six villages that made up the territory of Ampezzo, located in the middle of the Ampezzo valley. Cortina d'Ampezzo was designated as a major redoubt and held a large ammunition storage depot (46°36'50"N / 12°09'27"E). In 1945 it was assigned as a holdout by Italian and German troops to prevent the Americans and British from advancing into Austria. The town and the depot were scheduled to be attacked on 26 April 1945. Only last-minute weather prevented this strike by the 15th AF / 49th BW.

=== Winter sport resort destination ===
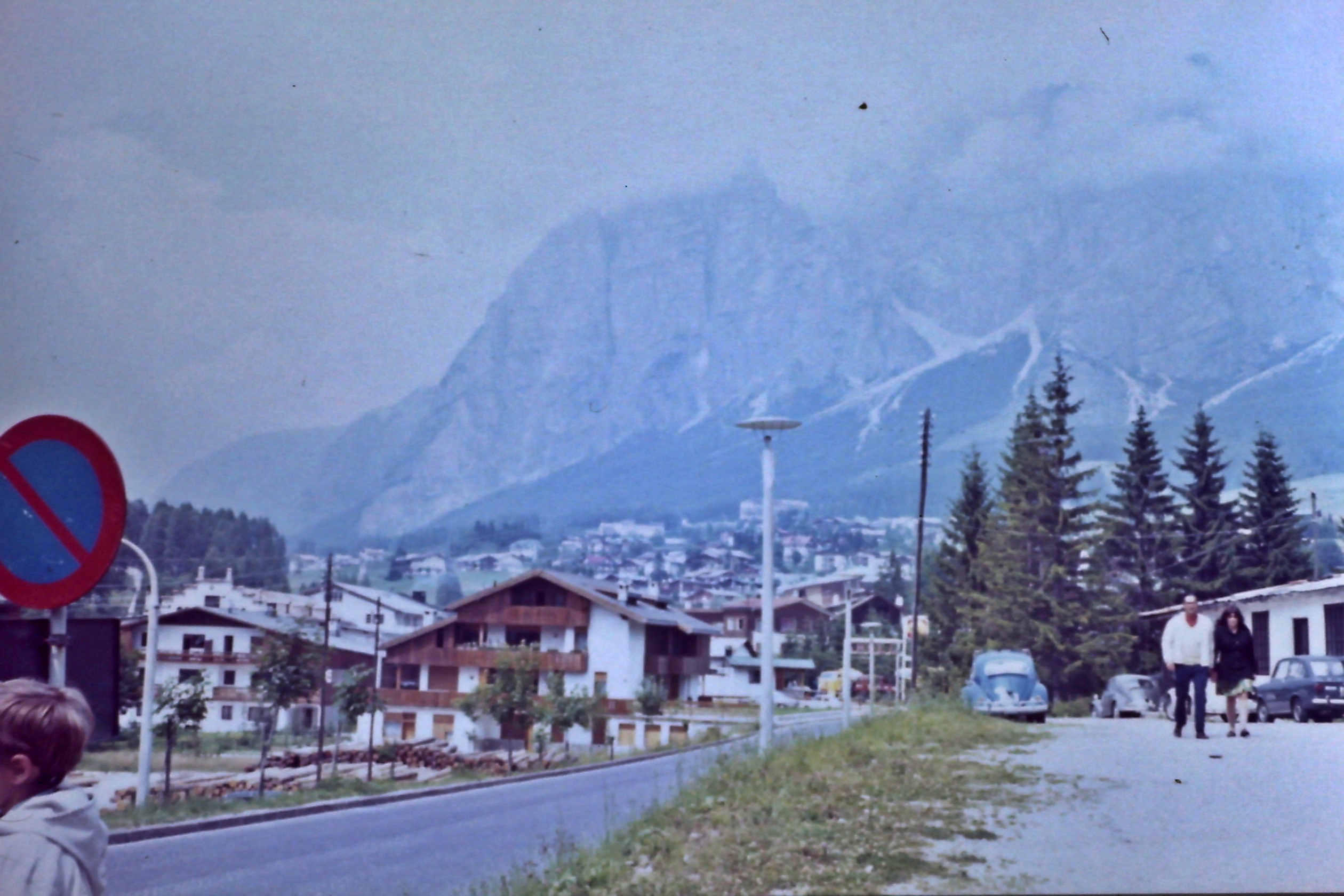
Cortina d'Ampezzo, 1971

Already an elite destination for the first British tourists in the late 19th and early 20th centuries, after World War I Cortina d'Ampezzo became a resort for upper-class Italians, too. Cortina d'Ampezzo was chosen as the venue of the 1944 Winter Olympic Games, which did not take place due to World War II. After hosting the 1956 Winter Olympics, Cortina grew into a world-famous resort experiencing a substantial increase in tourism.

With a resident population of 6,150 people in 2008, Cortina has a temporary population of around 50,000 during peak periods such as the Christmas holidays and mid-August. The central Piazza Angelo Dibona and the Corso Italia are cobbled and are absolutely car-free zones. The resort offers 120 km of pistes divided into three separate ski areas. Faloria-Cristallo, Tofana-Socrepes, and Cinque Torri-Lagazuoi each have their own ambient design. Lagazuoi is linked to the Sella Ronda ski area with another 400 km of pistes.

These ski areas are linked by buses, lifts, and pistes. The Cortina ski school was founded in 1933, and there is also a cross-country school benefiting from 70 km of cross-country trails that are not very demanding. The Ford Cortina, the UK's best-selling car of the 1970s, was named after Cortina d'Ampezzo.

=== 21st-century politics ===
In 2002 the Ampezzaner rifle company Ŝizar Anpezo Hayden was brought back to life. Since Otto von Habsburg, the then head of the Habsburg family, visited Cortina in 2005, their patron has been Charles I of Austria. Especially because of the eventful history, the Habsburg brand is still very present in Cortina in the 21st century, as many pictures and photos of Franz Joseph I of Austria and of Charles I, who is particularly revered here, in inns, restaurants, bars and hotels testify. Since 2011 there has been a memorial for Maximilian I on the main square in memory of the year 1511 and the union of the Ampezzo valley basin with Tyrol.

The town voted in October 2007 to secede from the region of Veneto and join the neighbouring region, Trentino-Alto Adige/Südtirol. This was motivated by cultural ties with the Ladin-speaking community in South Tyrol and the attraction of lower taxes. The referendum is not executive, and a final decision on the matter can only be made by law from the Italian parliament with consent of both regional councils of Veneto and Trentino-Alto Adige/Südtirol.

In the European elections of 2014, the leading party was the Democratic Party with 30.4% of the vote, followed by Forza Italia (19.4%) and the autonomist Südtiroler Volkspartei with 14.1%.

== Geography and climate ==
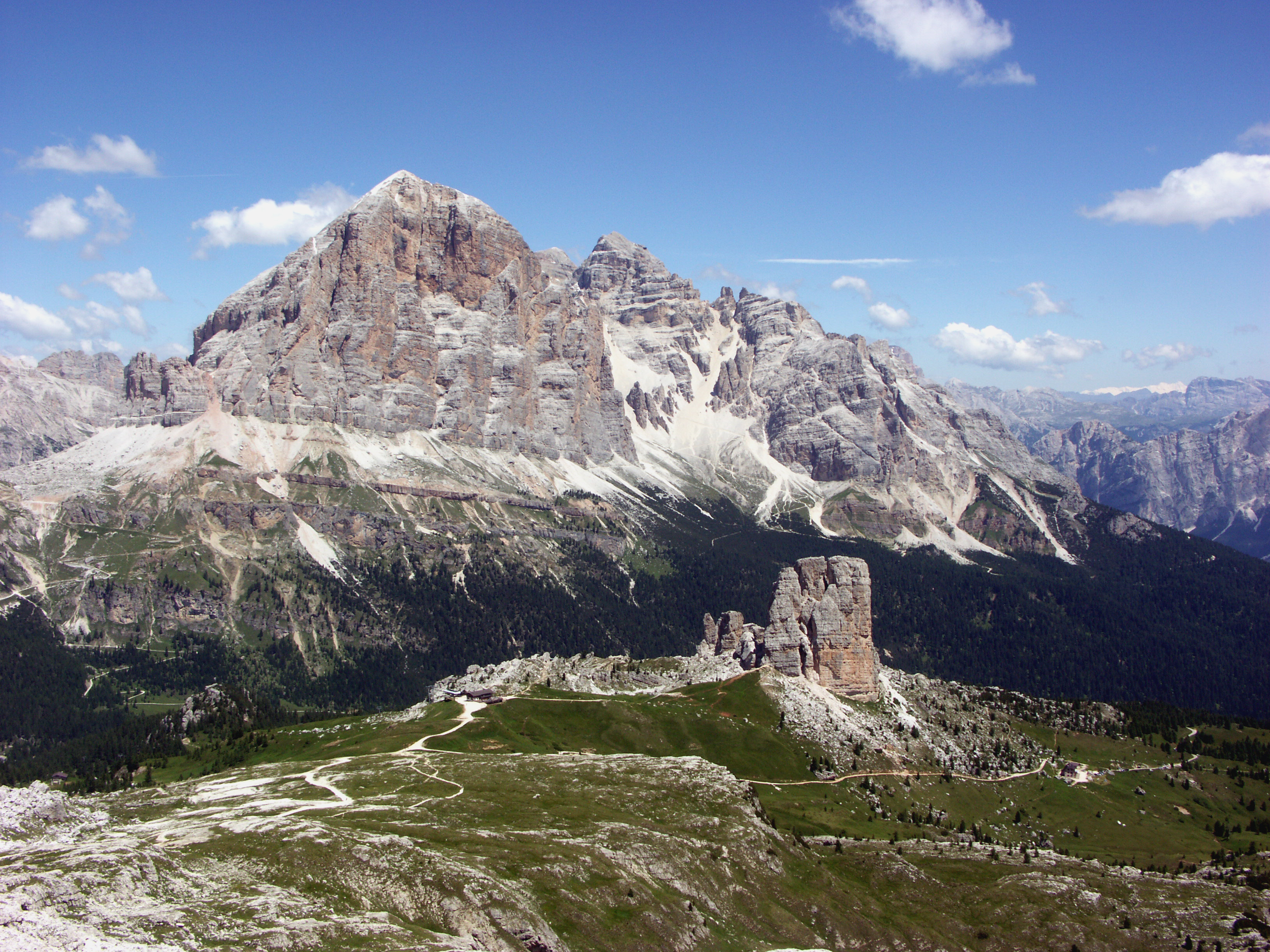
The Tofane mountain group

Cortina is situated more or less in the centre of the Ampezzo valley, at the top of the Valle del Boite in the Dolomites, which encircle the town. The Boite river flows directly through the town of Cortina itself. The mountains in the area are described as "craggy" and "soaring", "unmistakable; like a massive coral reef ripped from the sea, strung with conifers and laced with snow".

The town is positioned between Cadore (to the south) and the Puster Valley (to the north), Val d'Ansiei (to the east) and Agordo (to the west). Originally it consisted of numerous frazioni, isolated villages and hamlets, but from the 1950s it grew rapidly as a result of tourism. Only the most remote villages have remained isolated from the main town. San Vito di Cadore is 9 kilometres (5.6 mi) to the south of Cortina d'Ampezzo.

Among the surrounding mountains are Tofane to the west, Pomagagnon to the north, Cristallo to the northeast, Faloria and Sorapiss to the east, and Becco di Mezzodì, Croda da Lago and Cinque Torri to the south. Monte Antelao (Nantelou in Ladin) is at 3,264 m the highest mountain in the Ampezzo Dolomites and the second highest in the Dolomites. When the weather is good, Monte Antelao is clearly visible from the rive in Trieste on the Adriatic Sea. The town centre is at an elevation of 1,224 metres (4,016 ft).

The closest high peak is Tofana di Mezzo, which towers at 3,244 metres (10,643 ft). There are numerous fast flowing rivers, streams and small lakes in the territory, such as the Ghedina, Pianozes and d'Ajal, which fill particularly during the summer snow-melt season. Fauna include marmots, roe deer, chamois and hares and, on occasion, wolves, bears and lynx. Much of the area of Cortina is part of the "Natural Park of the Ampezzo Dolomites".

=== Frazioni ===
The comune contains the following frazioni (parishes/wards) with their Ladin names in parentheses: Acquabona (Agabòna), Alverà, Bigontina (Begontina), Cadelverzo (Cadelvèrzo), Cademai, Cadin (Ciadìn), Campo (Ciànpo), Chiamulera (Ciamulèra), Chiave (Ciàe), Cianderìes, Coiana (Cojana), Col, Cortina, Crìgnes, Doneà, Fiames (Fiàmes), Fraìna, Gilardon (Jilardòn), Gnòche o Gràa, Guargné, Lacedel (Lazedèl), Manaigo, Majon, Melères, Mortisa (Mortìja), Pecol (Pecòl), Pezié, Pian da Lago, Pocol (Pocòl), Rònco, Salieto, Socol, Staulin (Staulìn), Val, Verocai, Vera (Vèra), Zuel (Zuèl).

=== Climate ===
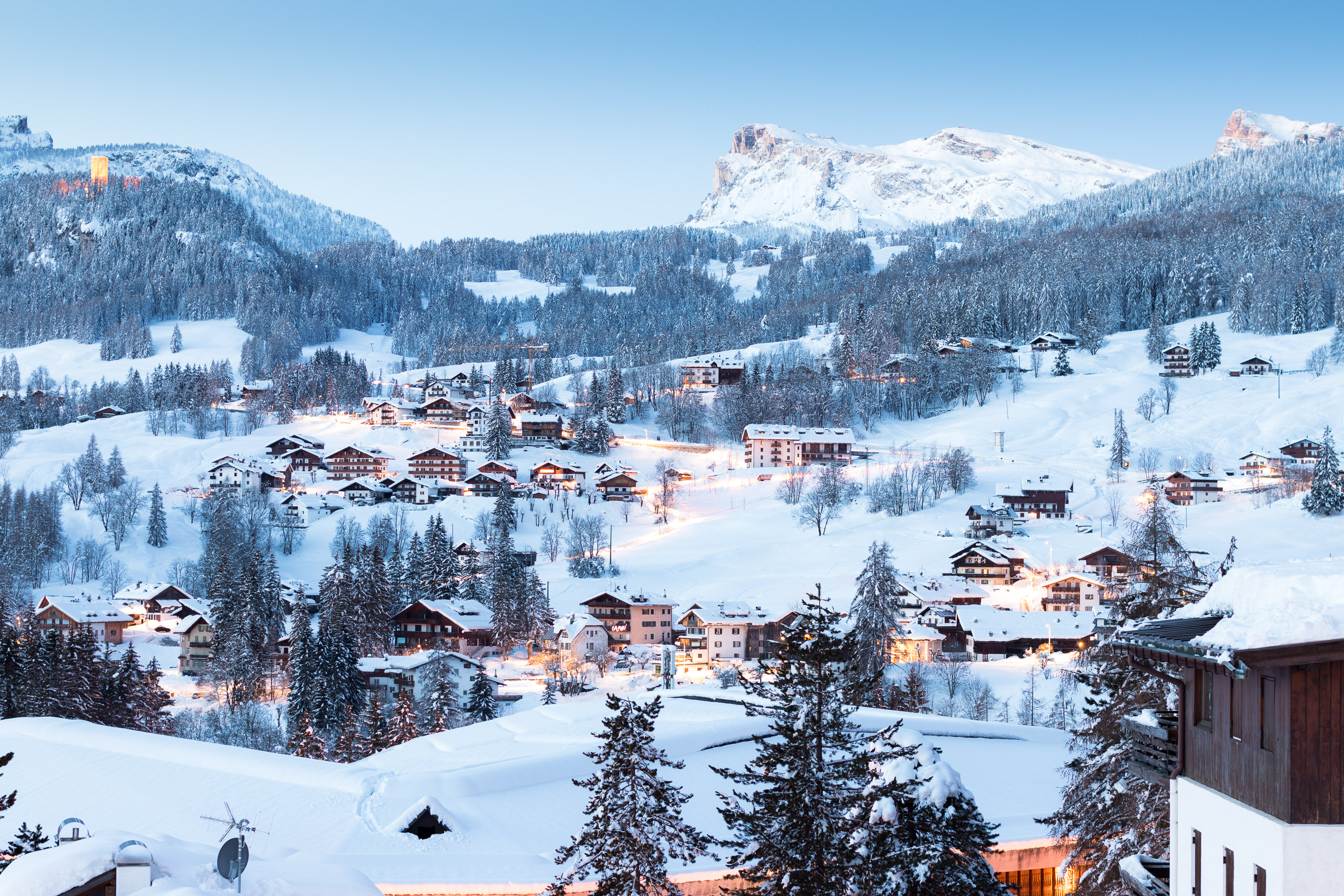
A winter view of Cortina d'Ampezzo

Cortina d'Ampezzo has a cold alpine humid continental climate, close to a taiga climate (Köppen: Dfb; Trewartha: Dclo), with short, mild summers and long, freezing cold winters, that vacillate between frigid, snowy, unsettled, and temperate. In late December and early January, some of Italy's lowest recorded temperatures are in the region, especially at the top of the Cimabanche Pass on the border between the provinces of Belluno and Bolzano. The other seasons are generally rainy, cool to warm, and windy. During the summer, temperatures can reach 25°C.

Climate data for Cortina d'Ampezzo, elevation 1,216 m (3,990 ft), (1991–2020)
Month	Jan	Feb	Mar	Apr	May	Jun	Jul	Aug	Sep	Oct	Nov	Dec	Year
Mean daily maximum °C (°F)	3.8 (38.8)	4.7 (40.5)	8.0 (46.4)	11.3 (52.3)	15.7 (60.3)	19.8 (67.6)	21.9 (71.4)	21.5 (70.7)	16.9 (62.4)	12.4 (54.3)	7.0 (44.6)	3.9 (39.0)	12.2 (54.0)
Daily mean °C (°F)	−0.8 (30.6)	−0.1 (31.8)	2.9 (37.2)	6.3 (43.3)	10.5 (50.9)	14.2 (57.6)	16.1 (61.0)	16.0 (60.8)	11.8 (53.2)	7.9 (46.2)	3.1 (37.6)	−0.2 (31.6)	7.3 (45.2)
Mean daily minimum °C (°F)	−5.3 (22.5)	−4.9 (23.2)	−2.2 (28.0)	1.2 (34.2)	5.3 (41.5)	8.6 (47.5)	10.3 (50.5)	10.4 (50.7)	6.8 (44.2)	3.3 (37.9)	−0.7 (30.7)	−4.3 (24.3)	2.4 (36.3)
Average precipitation mm (inches)	47.7 (1.88)	40.7 (1.60)	54.4 (2.14)	74.2 (2.92)	112.9 (4.44)	115.1 (4.53)	126.8 (4.99)	142.7 (5.62)	106.6 (4.20)	120.6 (4.75)	131.6 (5.18)	62.3 (2.45)	1,135.6 (44.7)
Average precipitation days (≥ 1.0 mm)	4.6	4.9	6.1	9.6	13.5	13.4	13.3	12.9	9.2	8.8	8.3	5.5	110.1
Source: Istituto Superiore per la Protezione e la Ricerca Ambientale

== Demographics ==
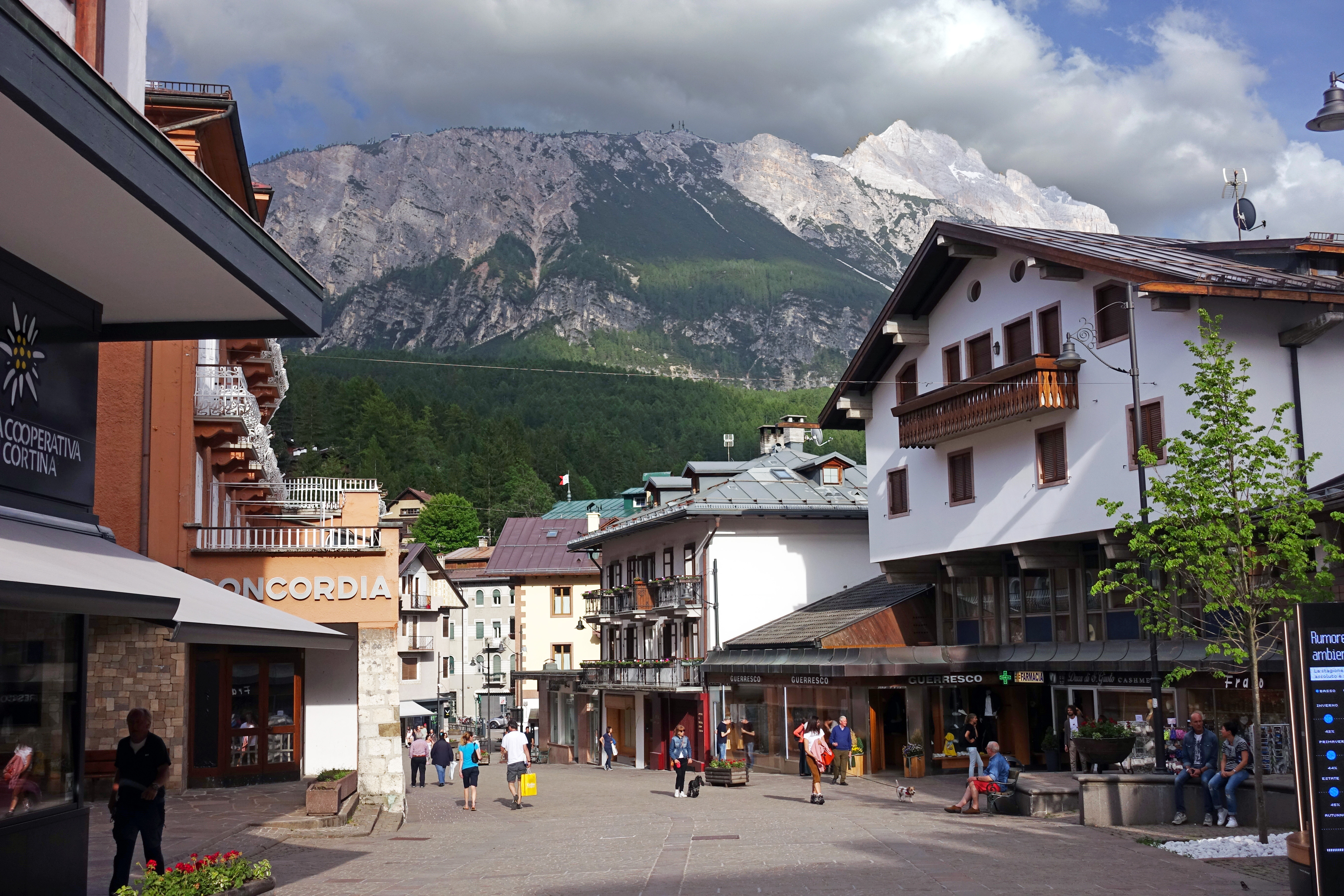
Cortina d'Ampezzo in June 2019

Cortina's population grew steadily from the time when it was annexed to the Italian State until the 1960s. Thereafter, it underwent a sharp decline, down by 2,099 inhabitants over a 30-year period, with signs of recovery only in the very last few years. With 6,112 inhabitants, Cortina d'Ampezzo is the seventh most populous place in the province, following Belluno (36,509), Feltre (20,688), Sedico (9,734), Ponte nelle Alpi (8,521), Santa Giustina (6,795) and Mel (6,272). In 2008, there were 44 births (7.1 ‰) and 67 deaths (10.9‰), resulting in an overall reduction of 23 inhabitants (−3.8 ‰). The town's 2,808 families consisted on average of 2.2 persons.

The presence of foreign residents in Cortina d'Ampezzo is a fairly recent phenomenon, accounting for only a small number of inhabitants in what in any case is a fairly small town. As of 1 January 2025, there were 279 foreigners residing in the town, representing 5.1% of the resident population. This compares with 7.0% in the town Belluno, 6.4% in the entire province of Belluno, and 10.2% in the Veneto region.

=== Language and dialects ===
In addition to Italian, the majority of the population speak fluent Ampezzano, a local variant of the Ladin language. Ladin is a Rhaeto-Romance language closely related to Romansh, which is spoken in Switzerland. The preservation of the local language, as a living medium used by younger generations, is seen as a symbol of pride and attachment to local heritage.

Ladin and Tyrolean culture continues to survive despite the increasing pressure faced in recent years. Its importance is even beginning to be recognized by the local authorities who in December 2007 decided to use Ladin on signs for the names of streets and villages in compliance with regulations for the protection of linguistic minorities in force since 1999.

== Economy ==
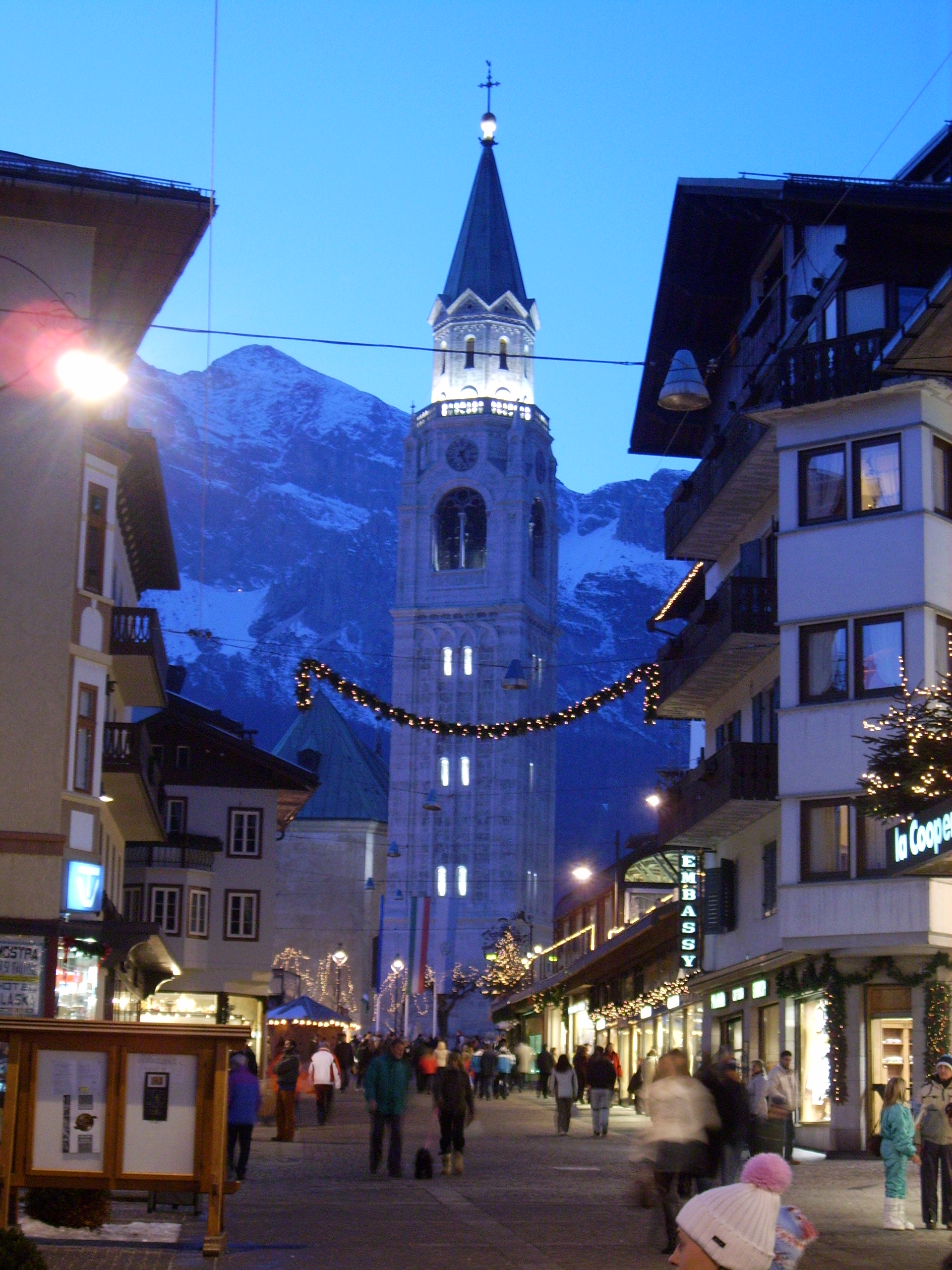
Shops in the town center of Cortina d'Ampezzo

In the 19th century, Ampezzo became a notable regional centre for crafts. The growing importance of this sector led the Austrian Ministry of Commerce to authorize the opening of a State Industrial School in 1874, which later became the Art Institute. It became a reputable institution in teaching wood and metalwork, admitting boys from the age of 13 for up to four years of study.

The local handmade products were appreciated by early British and German vacationers as tourism emerged in the late 19th century. Some of the local items were said to have mythical qualities; the Austrian journalist and anthropologist Karl Felix Wolff, for example, stated in 1935 that according to legend a local man "once made a sword that was so flexible that you could bend it over, tie it up, and then allow it to straighten out again". Among the specializations of the town were crafting wood for furniture; the production of tiled stoves; and iron, copper, and glass items.

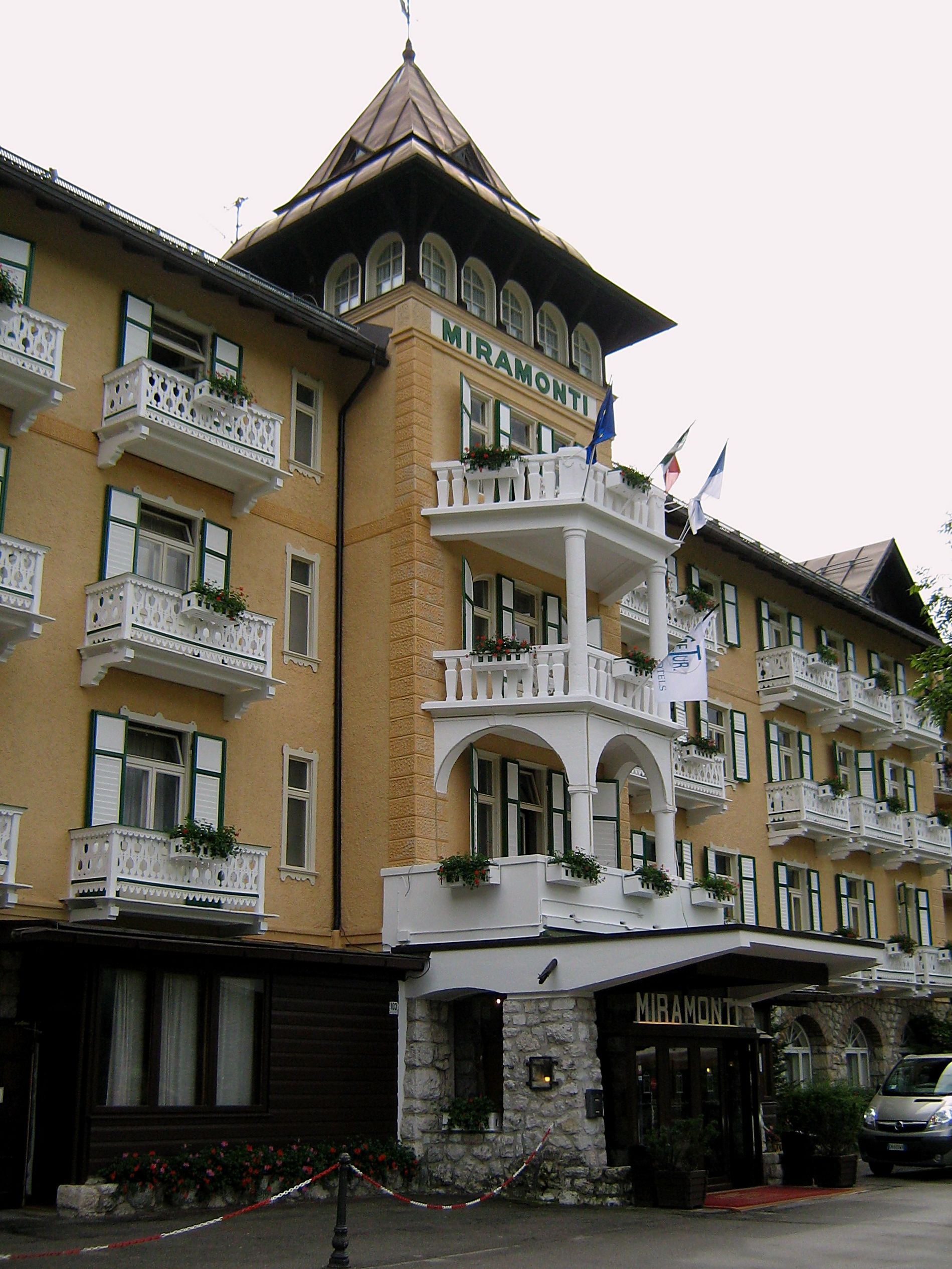
Hotel Miramonti featured in the 1981 James Bond film For Your Eyes Only

Today the local economy thrives on tourism, particularly during the winter season, when the population of the town typically increases from about 7,000 to 40,000. In 2009, Lonely Planet referred to Cortina d'Ampezzo as "one of Italy's most famous, fashionable and expensive ski resorts", which "boasts first-class facilities (skiing, skating, sledding, climbing) and superb hiking".

Cortina d'Ampezzo is home to some of the most prestigious names in fashion (including Bulgari, Benetton, Gucci, and Geox) and artisan shops, antiquarians, and craft stores. It is home to many stores specializing in mountaineering equipment. The symbol of Cortina shopping remains La Cooperativa di Cortina, founded in June 1893 as Consumverein Ampezzo. This shopping centre sells confectionery, newspaper, toys, and skiing equipment. The building is divided into three levels.

The five-star Miramonti Majestic Grand Hotel, of James Bond fame, is more than 100 years old. Previously an Austro-Hungarian hunting lodge, it contains 105 rooms. Other hotels of note include Hotel Cornelio on Via Cantore, Hotel Montana on Corso Italia, Hotel Menardi on Via Majom, Hotel Villa Gaiai on Via Guide Alpine, and the Grand Hotel Savoia on Via Roma. There are several mountain hostels in the vicinity, including Rifugio Faloria, Rifugio son Forca, Rifugio Capanna Tondi and Rifugio duca d'Aosta, which contains restaurants.

The cooperative in Cortina was one of the first cooperatives founded in the Italian Peninsula and currently provides employment to approximately 200 people.

== Landmarks ==
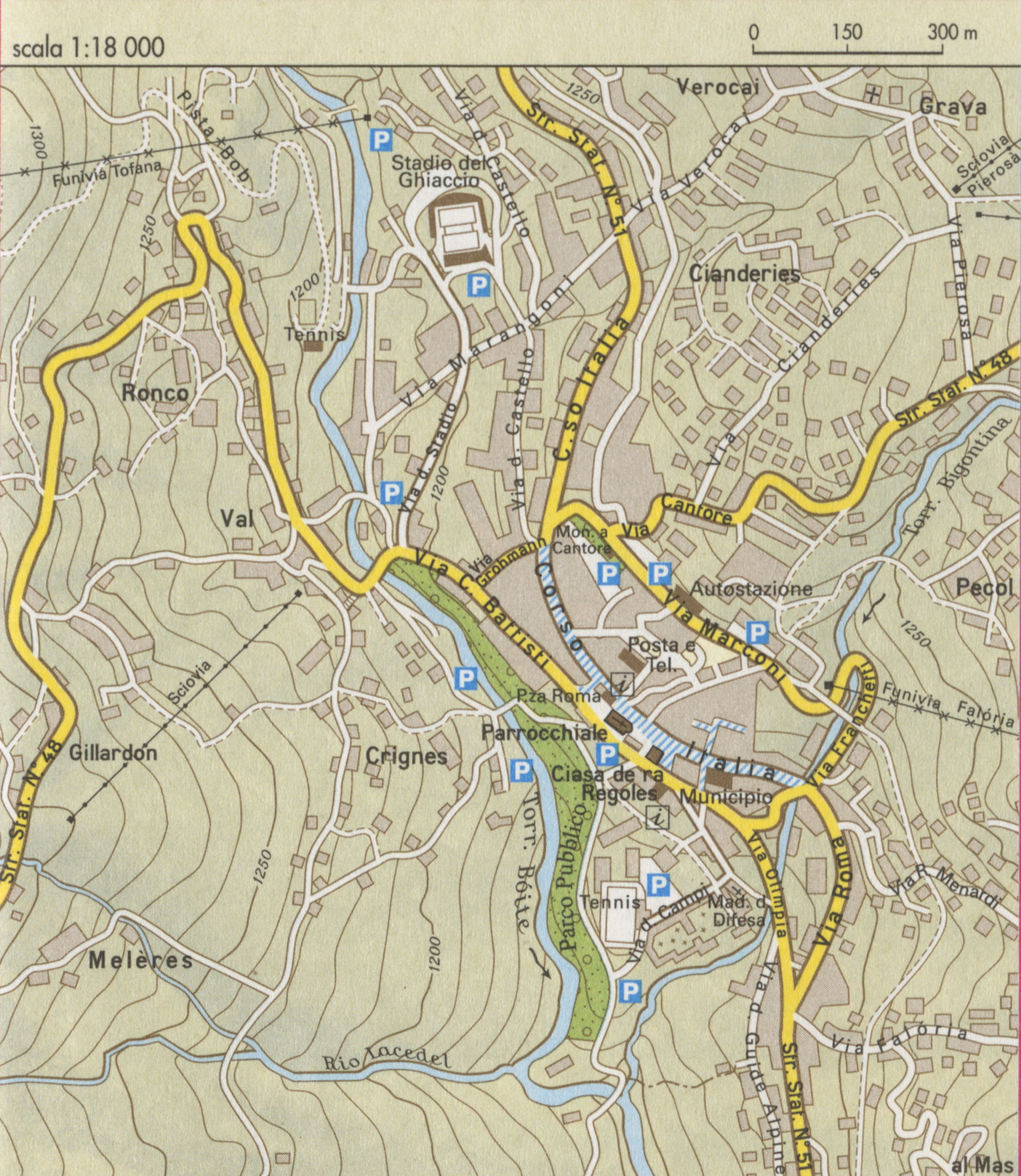
A map of the city

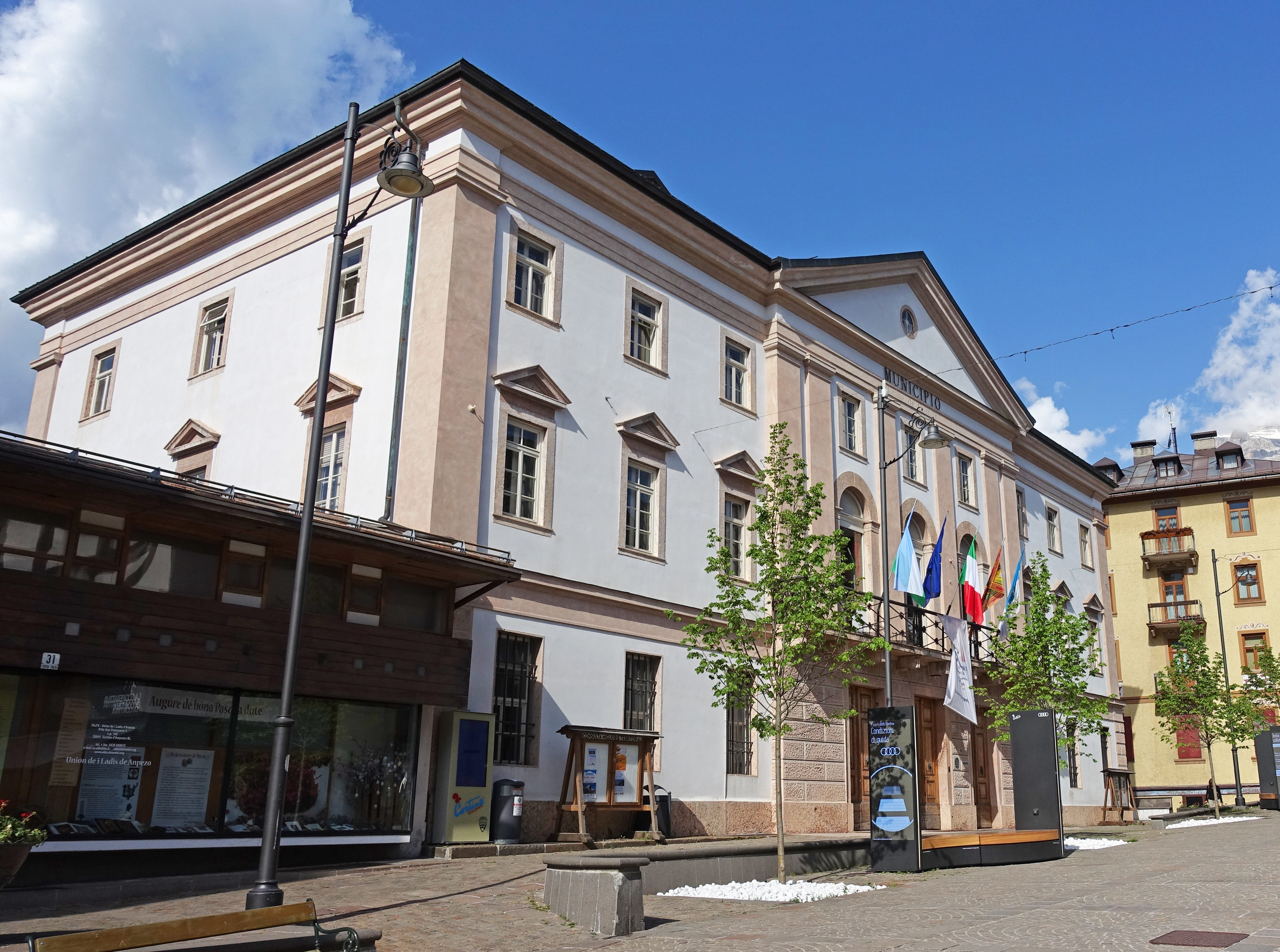
The Town Hall

Near the bridge on the Bigontina River is the Town Hall, a palace in the Tyrolean style. Piazza Angelo Dibona houses several landmarks. The Ciasa de ra Regoles is one of the more important legal buildings in Cortina d'Ampezzo, where the "regolieri" — a council for the local villages that stood before the town merged — train the community and give administrative orders. It was at one time the see of Cortina d'Ampezzo's primary school. It contains the offices of Comunanza delle Regole d'Ampezzo and the Modern Art Museum "Mario Rimoldi". The main square of Cortina d'Ampezzo is named after the famous local mountain guide Angelo Dibona.

=== Museums ===
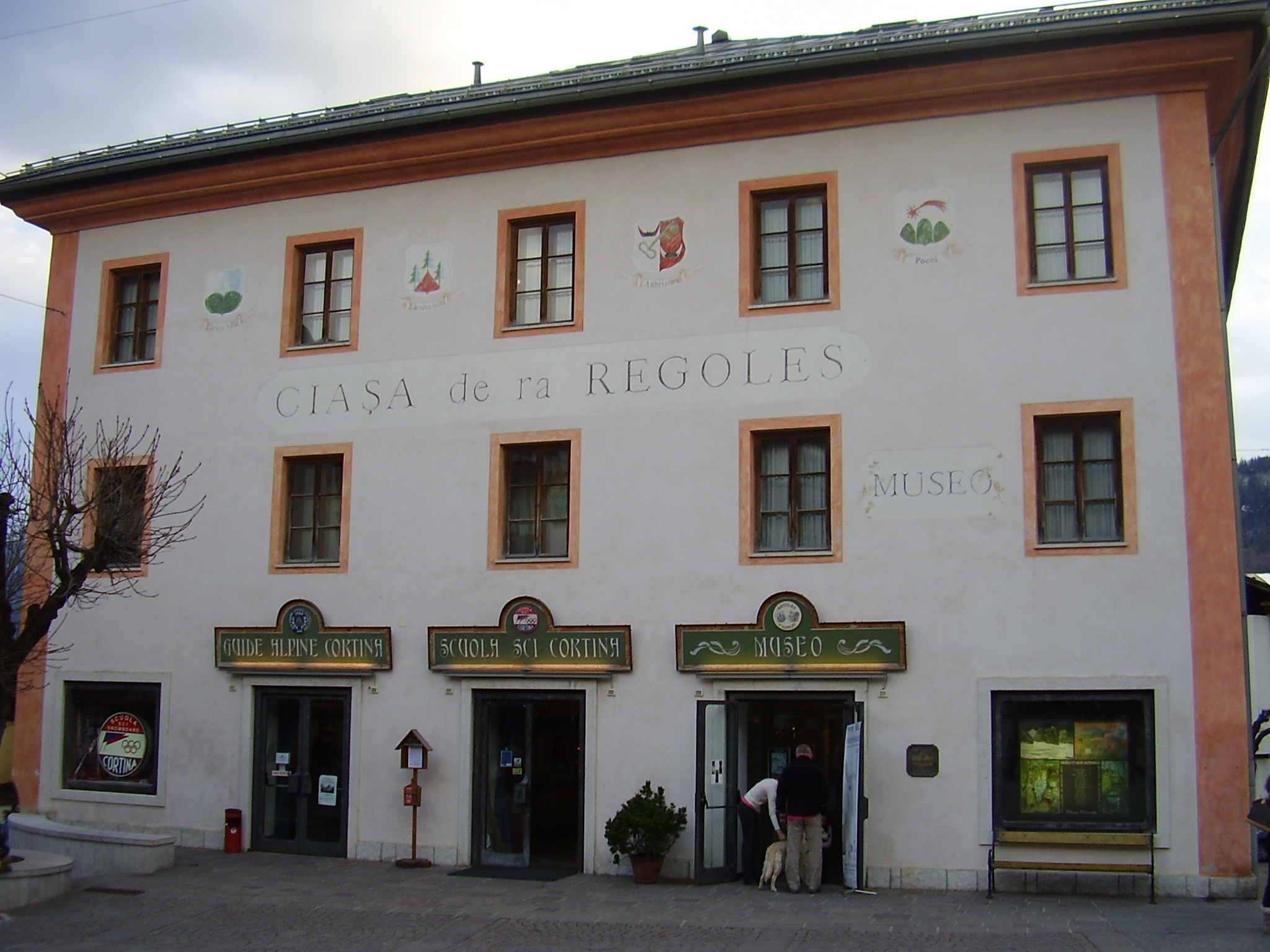
The Ciasa de ra Regoles

The Regole d'Ampezzo administer the Musei delle Regole d'Ampezzo, which covers three museums: Rinaldo Zardini Palaeontology Museum, Regole of Ampezzo Ethnographic Museum, and Mario Rimoldi Modern Art Museum.

The Rinaldo Zardini Palaeontology Museum, established in 1975, is a paleontological museum with a collection of hundreds of fossils of all colors, shapes, and sizes, which were found, gathered, and cataloged by local photographer Rinaldo Zardini. All of the pieces were found in the Dolomites and tell of a time when these high mountain peaks were still on the bottom of a large tropical sea, populated by marine invertebrates, fish, corals, and sponges.

The Regole of Ampezzo Ethnographic Museum is an ethnographic museum situated in an old restored Venetian sawmill at the confluence of the Boite and Felizon rivers to the north of the town. There are objects related to everyday life, rural, and pastoral practices in the vicinity; agricultural tools; techniques; materials processing; and clothing typical of the valley.

The Mario Rimoldi Modern Art Museum is an art gallery, established in 1941, which preserves over 800 works by major Italian artists of the 20th century including Filippo De Pisis, Felice Carena, Pio Semeghini, Renato Guttuso, Tullio Garbari, Massimo Campigli, and many others. It also hosts temporary exhibitions on various topics.

The Great War Tour stretches over 80 km (50 mi) across the mountains between Lagazuoi and Sass de Stria. It includes the Great War Open Air Museum with its trenches and tunnels. In winter it is accessible to skiers, but it is easier to visit on foot or by mountain bike in the summer months.

=== Churches ===
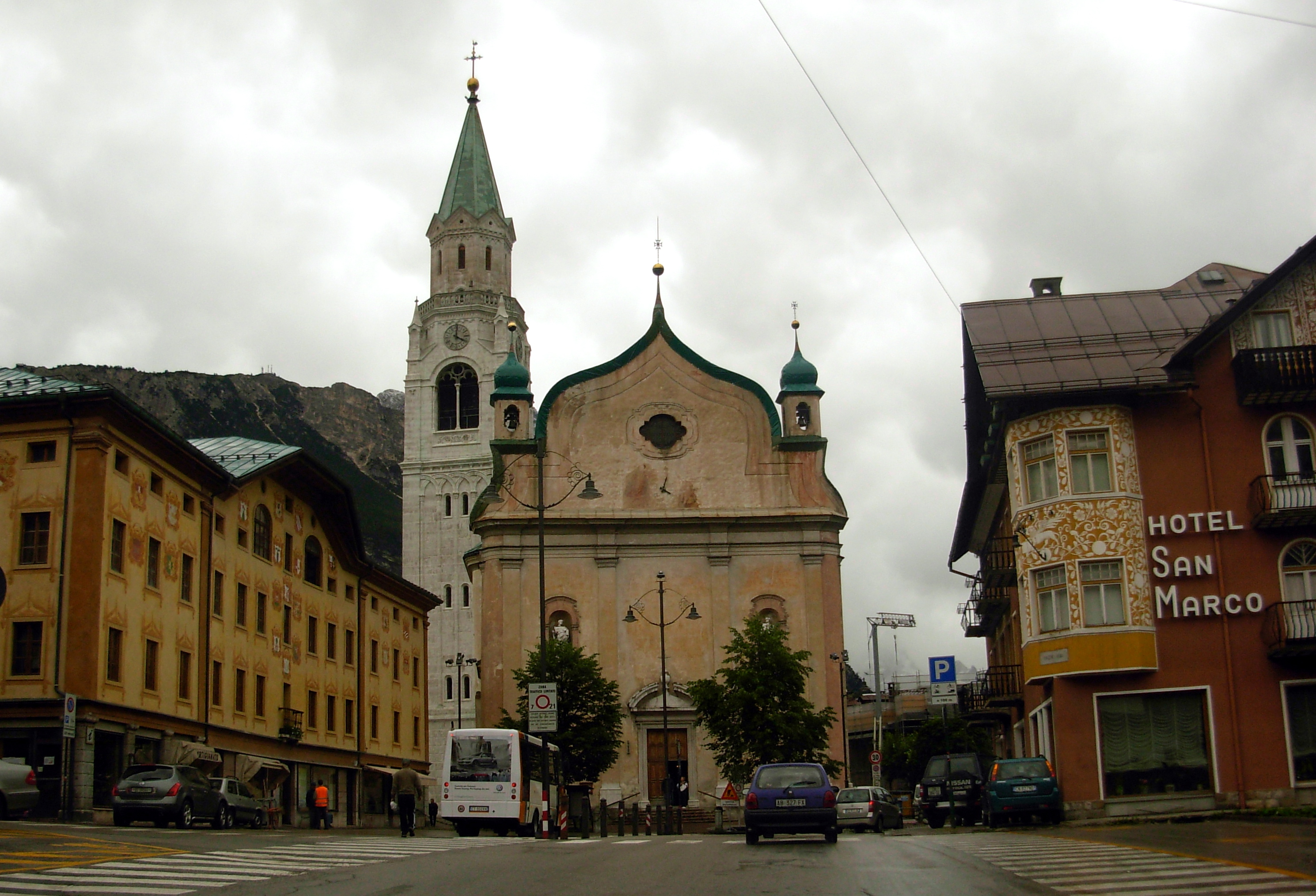
Basilica Minore dei Santi Filippo e Giacomo

The Basilica Minore dei Santi Filippo e Giacomo was built between 1769 and 1775 on the site of two former 13th and 16th-century churches; it is home to the parish and the deanery of Cortina d'Ampezzo. Its high wooden altar, crowned by a figure of Christ the Redeemer, was carved by Andrea Brustolon. On the ceiling are three frescoes by Luigi Ghedina: "Christ Purifying the Temple", "The Martyrdom of St. Philip", and "The Beheading of St. James".

The Chiesa della Madonna della Difesa was built in 1750 on the site of a ruined 14th-century building. Its façade features an intricate fresco depicting the Madonna della Difesa, and the interior is decorated with a wealth of statues, paintings, polychrome marble, and gold leaf.

The Cappella della Beata Vergine di Lourdes (Chapel of Our Lady of Lourdes) was completed in 1907. Decorated by artist Corrado Pitscheider of the Val Gardena, it is a small church of particular interest given the reconstruction sculpture.

The Cappella di Sant'Antonio da Padova in the village of Chiave was completed in 1791, but the interior was renovated in 1809 after serious fire damage caused by the Napoleonic troops. The furnishings include two wooden busts of Christ and St. Catherine as well as a richly designed altar.

Sacrario militare di Pocol (also known as Ossario di Pocol) is a cemetery and shrine located at an altitude of 1,535 metres (5,036 ft) towards Passo Falzarego, in the locality of Pocol. The small church and cemetery were built in 1916 as a military cemetery by the 5th Alpine group. A shrine was built in 1935 as a memorial to the thousands who lost their lives during World War I on the Dolomite front. It is a massive square tower of stone, clearly visible from the entire Ampezzo valley below. In a crypt in the centre of the structure rests the body of general Antonio Cantore, who was awarded the gold medal for military valor.

=== Castles and forts ===
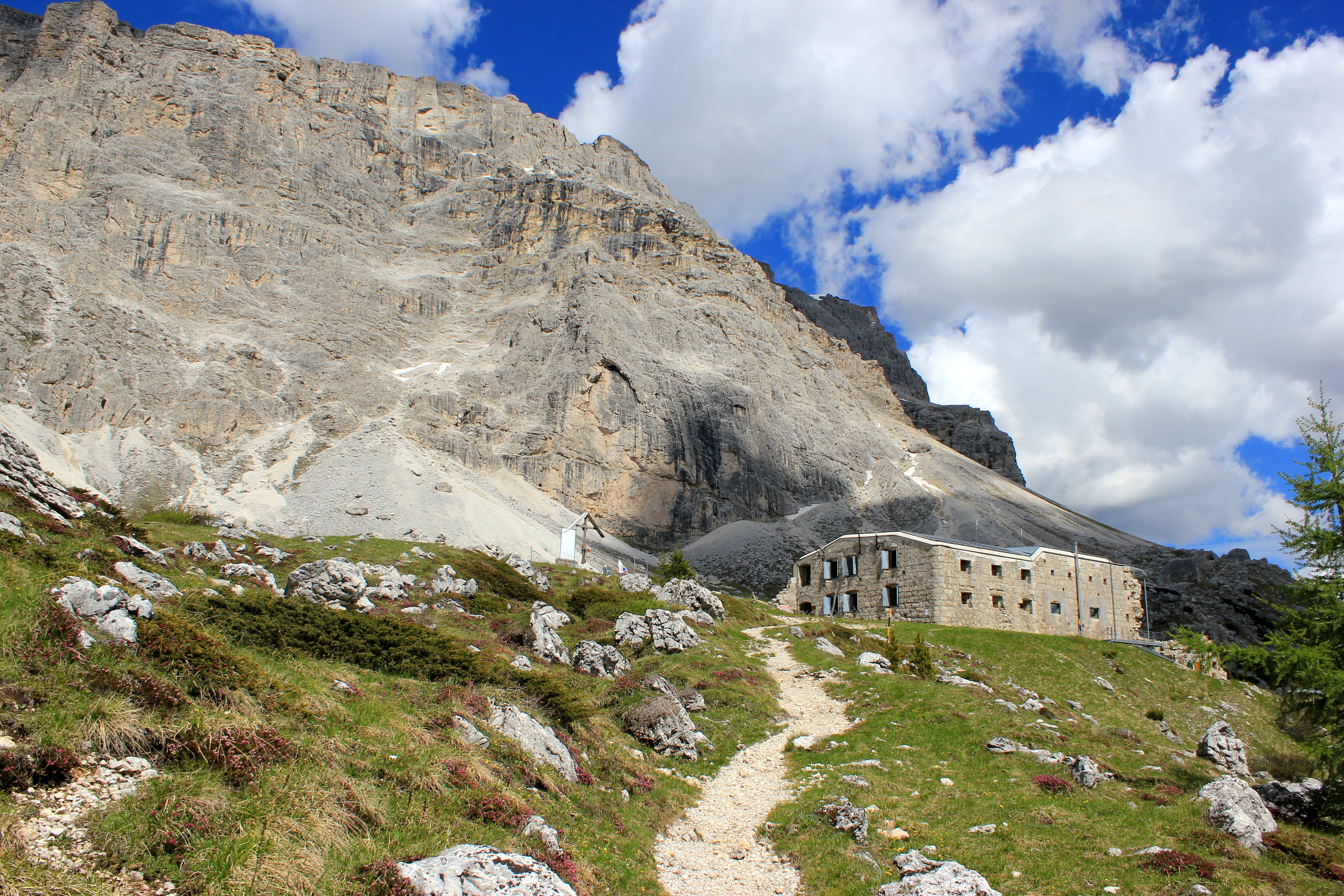
The Forte Tre Sassi

The Castello de Zanna is a small fortress, situated in the vila of Minel. It consists of low, white outer walls and two white corner towers, with a small chapel dedicated to the Holy Trinity. The construction of the castle began in 1694, but on 19 August 1696 work was interrupted; the building remained unfinished in 1809 when it was burned by French revolutionary troops who had invaded Ampezzo. Since then the castle has undergone restoration.

Forte Tre Sassi (or Forte Tra i Sassi) is a fortress constructed in 1897 during the Austro-Hungarian period on the Passo Valparola. It lies between Sass de Stria and Piccolo Lagazuoi, dominating the passage between the Passo Falzarego and Val Badia in South Tyrol (Alto Adige). It was part of the large complex of Austrian fortifications built on the Italian border in the late 19th and early 20th centuries. Rendered unusable due to a bombing by the Italians on 5 July 1915, the ruins remained in a state of disrepair until the advent of the 21st century, when it was restored by the local administration of Cortina d'Ampezzo with the assistance of the Lacedelli family. The fort houses a museum containing relics related to the First World War.

Castello di Botestagno (also known as Podestagno) was a medieval fort perched on a rock in the valley of the river Boite, a little farther north of Cortina d'Ampezzo. It is believed that it was first erected as a stakeout during conflict with the Lombards between the 7th and 8th centuries, with the aim of dominating the three valleys that converge beneath it: the Boite, the Val di Fanes, and the Val Felizon. The cornerstone probably dates to the 11th century.

It was held by the Germans until 1077, and then by the patriarchs of Aquileia (12th century) and Camino (13th century), until Botestagno became the seat of a captaincy. It then passed into Venetian hands and finally to the Habsburgs. During the 18th century the castle gradually lost importance until it was auctioned in 1782 by order of Emperor Joseph II. Today the fort has now almost completely disappeared; only the remnants of what must have been the wine cellars and the foundations remain, now weathered and largely covered up by vegetation.

== Culture ==
A travel poster for Cortina d'Ampezzo, circa 1920

Cortina d'Ampezzo has a long tradition in hosting writers, intellectuals, poets and editors from all over the world. Ernest Hemingway, Saul Bellow, Dino Buzzati, Vittorio Gassman, Leonardo Sciascia, Leonardo Mondadori and many others, spent their vacations in the town and took part in the cultural life of the city. Through the years, this led to a continuous activity of literature festivals and book presentations, like Una Montagna di Libri ("A Mountain of Books"), held twice a year since 2009. The festival attracted to Cortina d'Ampezzo writers as Azar Nafisi, Peter Cameron, and Emmanuel Carrère.

Music is important to the locals of Cortina d'Ampezzo, with a guitar found in most houses, and young musicians are often found walking the streets. Every year, from the end of July to early August, Cortina d'Ampezzo hosts the Dino Ciani Festival and Academy. It is held in honour of the celebrated Italian pianist Dino Ciani (1941–1974) who died when he was only 32. The festival attracts young pianists from around the world who are able to benefit from classes with some of the world's leading performers.

The Festival of the Bands is another annual musical event featuring brass bands from Italy and beyond during the last week of August. Cortina d'Ampezzo's own band, parading in traditional costumes, is a central attraction dating back to 1861. Cortina d'Ampezzo hosted the 1953 Miss Italia contest, won by Marcella Mariani. Traditionally, on the eves of the festivals of Ascension, Pentecost, Trinity and St Philip and St James, the youth of the town would climb the hills at sunset and light fires.

After Ernest Hemingway's wife Hadley lost a suitcase filled with Hemingway's manuscripts at the Gare de Lyon in Paris, he took a time off. He began writing that same year in Cortina d'Ampezzo, writing Out of Season.

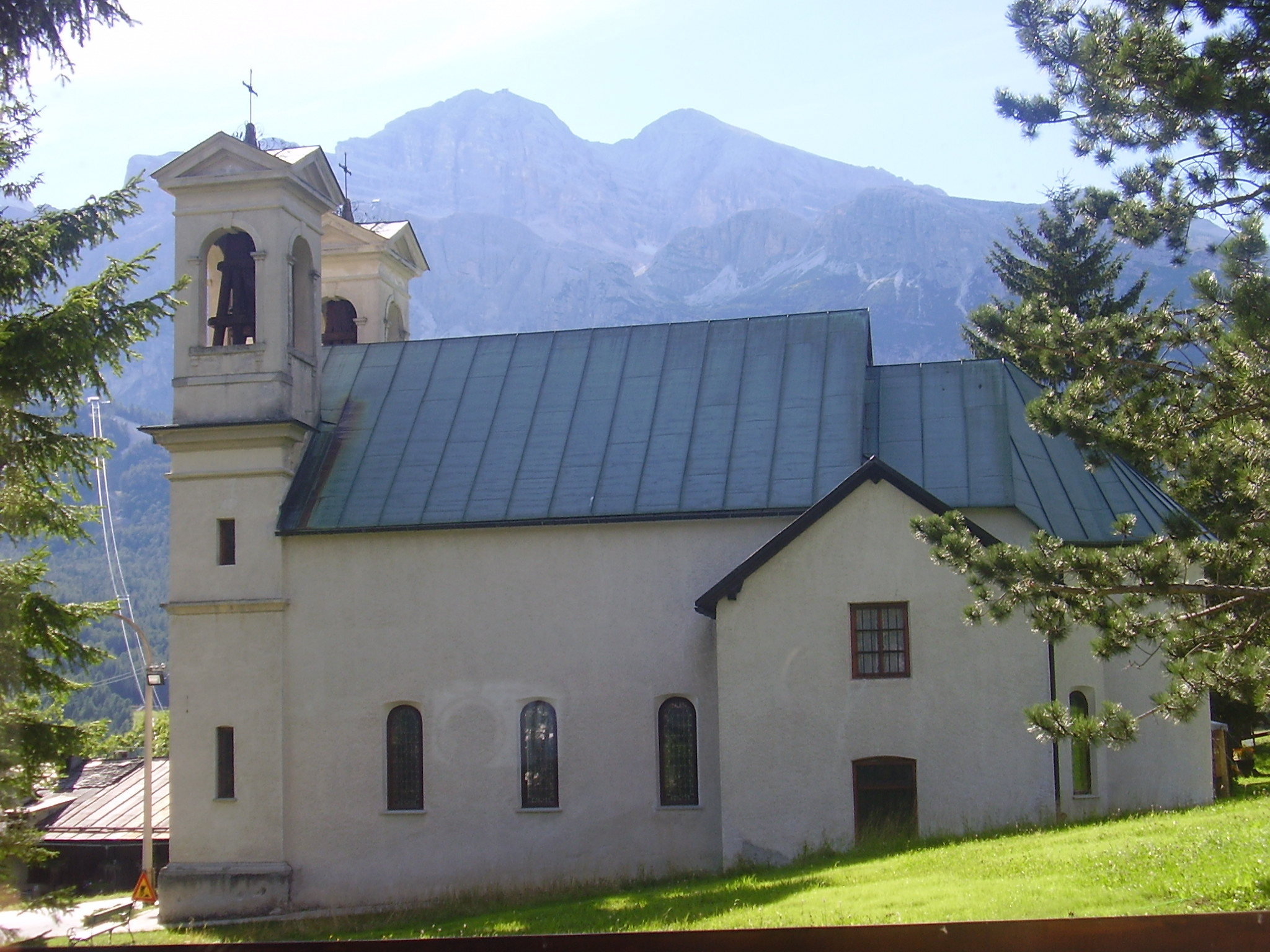
Grava Church

The dominant religion in the comune of Cortina d'Ampezzo is Roman Catholicism. Among the religious minorities, mainly a result of recent immigration, there is a small community of Eastern Orthodox Christians and Muslims. There is also a congregation of Jehovah's Witnesses, which has its headquarters in Pian da Lago.

The surroundings of Cortina have been the location for a number of movies, including mountain climbing scenes for Cliffhanger, Krull and The Pink Panther. The resort was the primary area for location shooting in Sergio Corbucci's Revisionist Spaghetti Western The Great Silence; the resort was used to represent Utah in the winter of 1898. It was a glamorous location for Elizabeth Taylor in Ash Wednesday (1973).

In 1981, Cortina was a major location for the 1981 James Bond film For Your Eyes Only. Roger Moore's James Bond meets the character Luigi Ferrara (John Moreno) at the peak of Tofana and stays at the Hotel Miramonti. A number of action sequences were shot in the town involving Bond and Erich Kriegler (John Wyman), as Kriegler competes in the biathlon. The battle culminates in one of the famous ski chase sequences in film, where Bond has to escape Kriegler and a crew of assassins on a spike-wheeled motorcycles, his route taking them all onto the bobsleigh run.

The town centre was the scene of the first attack on Bond and his partner Melina Havelock (Carole Bouquet) by two motorcyclists who attempted to run them over, only for Bond to kill them both, putting one of them through the window of a local florist. The town was the setting of the 1919 silent film Blind Husbands, directed by Erich von Stroheim.

In the Patricia Highsmith novel The Talented Mr. Ripley Cortina is where the character Dickie Greenleaf is supposed to meet up with his friend Freddie Miles, and is indeed a projected winter rendezvous for most of the books main young characters, though those plans never actually materialize.

=== Radio ===
Radio Cortina Dolomiti is a commercial radio station that has been operating since 1980. The FM reception frequencies are 7 for the provinces of Belluno, Bolzano, Pordenone, Treviso and Udine and in the car you can also listen on the Veneto Dab mux -channel 8D (201.072 MHz) for the Tri-Veneto area.

== Sports ==
Cortina d'Ampezzo

- Location within Alps
- Location: Italy
- Nearest city: Belluno
- Vertical: 1,611 meters (5,285 ft)
- Top elevation: 2,930 meters (9,610 ft)
- Base elevation: 1,224 meters (4,016 ft)
- Trails: 101 runs over 120km total; 45km (38%) easy; 59km (49%) intermediate; 16km (13%) difficult
- Longest run: 11 kilometers (6.8 mi)
- Total length: 120 km (70 mi)
- Lift system: 27 lifts and 33.5 km total; 6 aerial tramways; 19 chairlifts; 2 gondolas; 2 surface lifts
- Lift capacity: 42,212 Passengers/hour
- Website: Cortina Dolomiti

Cortina d'Ampezzo hosted the 1956 Winter Olympics, originally scheduled for 1944, but cancelled because of World War II. The 1927 Nordic, 1941 Nordic, and 1941 Alpine World Championships were held in Cortina d'Ampezzo as well, although both 1941 championships were withdrawn by the International Ski Federation (FIS) in 1946. The region lost Winter Olympics bids in 1988 to Calgary, and 1992 to Albertville, France.

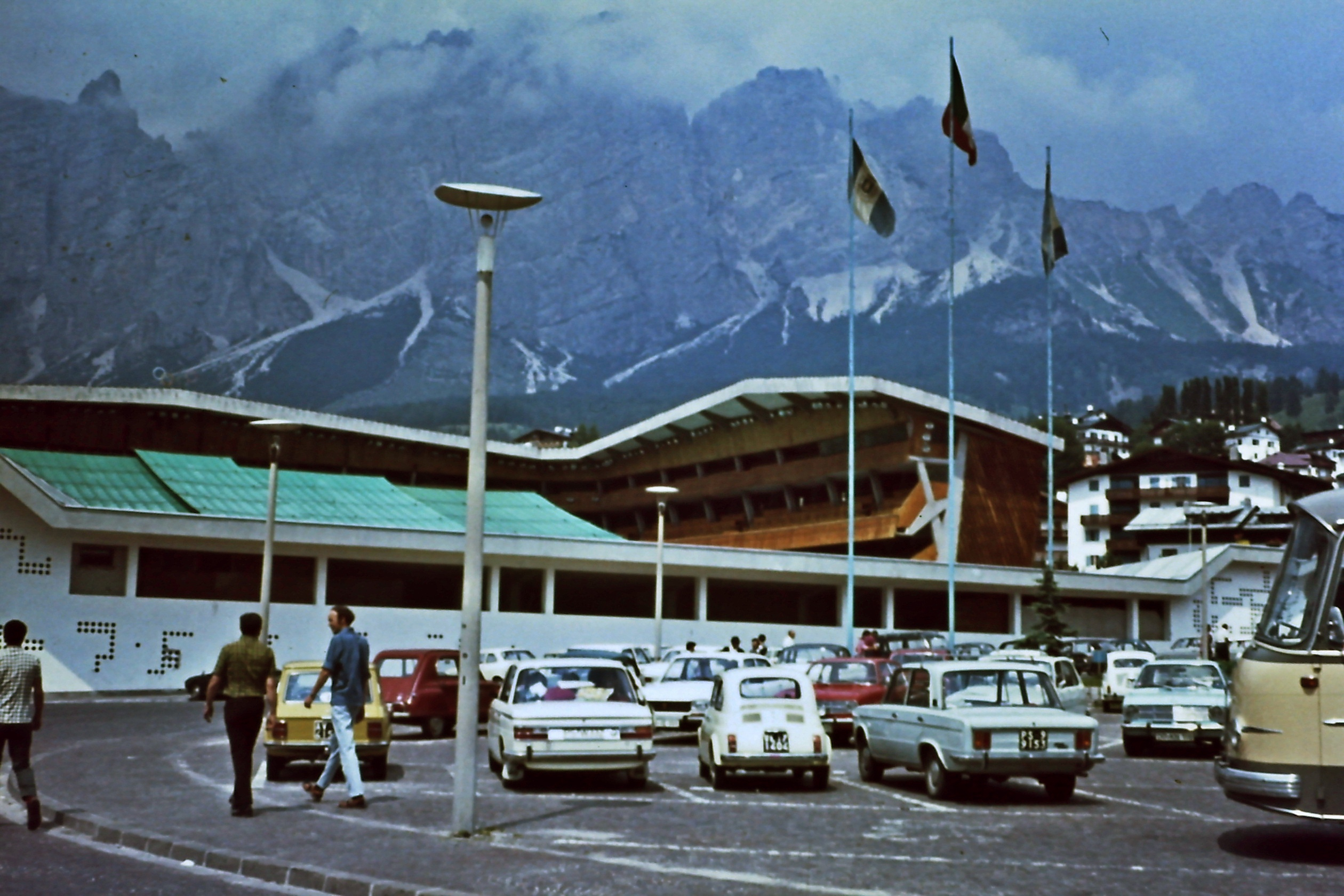
Stadio Olimpico Del Ghiaccio in summer 1971

Cortina d'Ampezzo hosted the 2021 Alpine World Championships, and jointly with Milan, hosted the 2026 Winter Olympics and the 2026 Winter Paralympics marking the second time Cortina hosted the Olympic games.

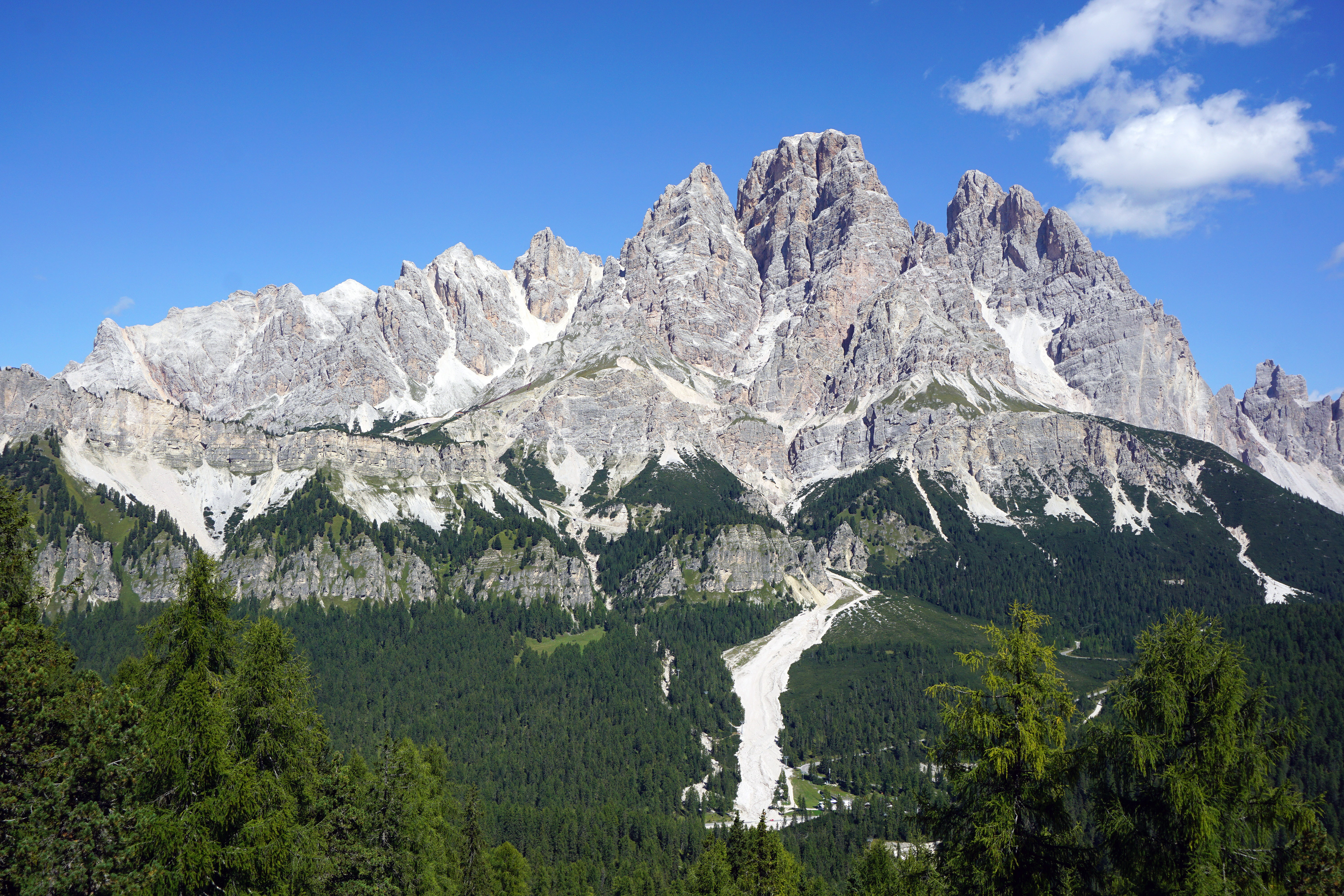
Monte Cristallo (3,221 m)

The town is home to SG Cortina, a professional ice hockey team in Serie A1, Italy's top division. Cortina d'Ampezzo is also the start and end point of the annual Dolomites Gold Cup Race, a historical re-evocation event for production cars on public roads. The town hosted the Red Bull Road Rage in 2009.

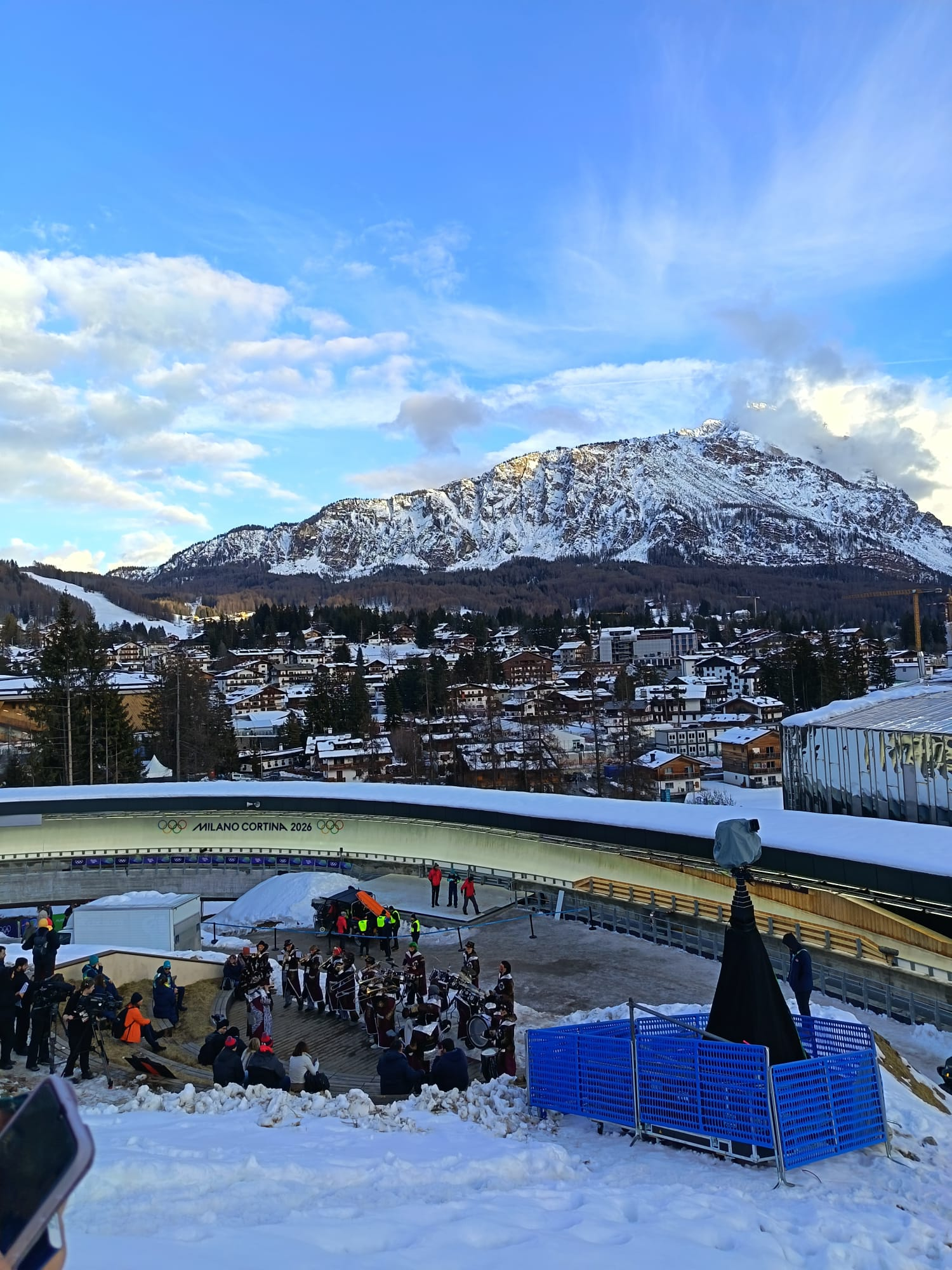
The Cortina Sliding Centre during the 2026 Winter Olympics.

Cortina d'Ampezzo also offers skiing facilities for amateurs, centrally located among the 12 resorts of the Dolomiti Superski area. Cortina d'Ampezzo itself has 115 km (71 mi) of pistes with 34 lifts and guaranteed snow coverage of over 95% from December to April. There are six ski schools (two for cross-country) and some 300 instructors.

The Faloria-Cristallo-Mietres ski area has views over the Ampezzo Valley and is suitable for all abilities, including children. The Tofane area offers more challenging opportunities from an elevation of 2,500 m (8,200 ft) with the Canalone and Schuss ski runs.

The longest run, the Armentarola piste in the Lagazuoi-5 Torri area, starts next to the Lagazuoi refuge at 2,752 m (9,029 ft) and is reached by cable car. With the Forcella Staunies (currently not in operation) and the Forcella Rossa, the ski area has one of the steepest slopes in the Dolomites. There are numerous ski freeride and tour options in the mountains around Cortina d'Ampezzo.

Facilities also exist for cross-country skiing, including a long stretch of the old railway line. In and around Cortina d'Ampezzo, there are opportunities to participate in many other winter sports such as curling, ski mountaineering, snowboarding, sledding, and extreme skiing. In the summer months, sports include trekking, trail running, biking, rock climbing, tennis, golf, swimming, and ice skiing. Cortina d'Ampezzo is known for the many via ferratas in the surrounding mountains such as the VF Ivano Dibona that was used in the movie Cliffhanger. The annual Lavaredo Ultra Trail series of international trail running races is based at Cortina d'Ampezzo.

== Gastronomy ==
Cortina d'Ampezzo provides an culinary experience that blends local traditions with Austrian influences. The region's cuisine, featuring savory entrees such as "chenedi" and "Casunziei" and hearty meat dishes like mushroom roast and "gröstl," is a testament to its cultural heritage.

== Transport ==
The new retro styled Espresso Cadore is a sleeper train and was brought back into service in 2024.

The nearest train station is Calalzo-Pieve di Cadore-Cortina, located 35 km south of Cortina d'Ampezzo. To facilitate connections to the "Queen of the Dolomites," the station is connected to the Cortina Link service, operated by Trenitalia and Dolomitibus. The service timetable valid until 13 June 2026, indicates an increase in services related to the Winter Olympic Games.

During the Milan–Cortina 2026 Winter Olympic Games, it is easy to reach the heart of the Dolomites and participate in the scheduled events with daily connections from Venice Mestre.

Cortina d'Ampezzo was the principal intermediate station on the narrow-gauge (950 mm) Dolomites Railway from Calalzo to Toblach. When the line was electrified in 1929 the only sub-station was established at Cortina d'Ampezzo. The line closed in 1964 but in February 2016 the regional governments of Veneto and Trentino-Alto Adige announced that they are to commission a feasibility study to build a new line between Calalzo, Cortina d'Ampezzo and Toblach.

The Cortina Airport was built for the 1956 Winter Olympics, but is currently closed. The nearest airports are those serving Venice. The distance to Treviso is 138 km (86 mi) while that to Venice Marco Polo Airport is 148 km (92 mi). Both can be reached in about two and a quarter hours by road.

== Notable people ==
Cortina d'Ampezzo has attracted many distinguished guests, often inspiring them in their creative work. They include the Italian novelists Dino Buzzati (1906–1972), author of The Tartar Steppe, Goffredo Parise (1929–1986) and Fernanda Pivano (1917–2009). Ernest Hemingway, author of A Farewell to Arms, also arrived in the area in 1918 as a young ambulance driver.

Other notable visitors include John Ball (1818–1889), the Irish mountaineer and naturalist who climbed Monte Pelmo in 1857, the Italian mountaineers Emilio Comici (1901–1940), Angelo Dibona (1879–1956) and Lino Lacedelli (1925–2009), the Italian skier Kristian Ghedina (born 1969), the Italian bobsledder Eugenio Monti (1928–2003), the Austrian mountaineer Paul Grohmann (1838–1908) and the Austrian skier Toni Sailer (1935–2009). Frequent visitors include the Italian businessman and former racing driver Paolo Barilla (born 1961) and the journalist and writer Indro Montanelli (1909–2001).

Among the distinguished sportsmen from Cortina d'Ampezzo itself are the skiers Enrico Colli, his younger brother Vincenzo, and Giuseppe Ghedina who competed in the 1924 Winter Olympics, Severino Menardi who participated in the 1932 and 1936 Winter Olympics, and Stefania Constantini, gold-medalist curler in the 2022 Winter Olympics. Other local citizens include the climbers Angelo Dibona (1879–1956) and Lino Lacedelli (1925–2009), and the painter Luigi Gillarduzzi (1822–1856).

== International relations ==
=== Twin towns / sister cities ===
Cortina is twinned with:

- Cattolica, Italy (since 16 March 1971)
- Skardu, Pakistan (2010)

== See also ==
- Italian front (World War I)
- White War
