= Luigi Gillarduzzi =

Austrian-Italian painter (1822–1856)

Luigi Gillarduzzi or Alois Gillarduzzi (2 February 1822 – 1856) was an Austrian-Italian painter.

== Biography ==
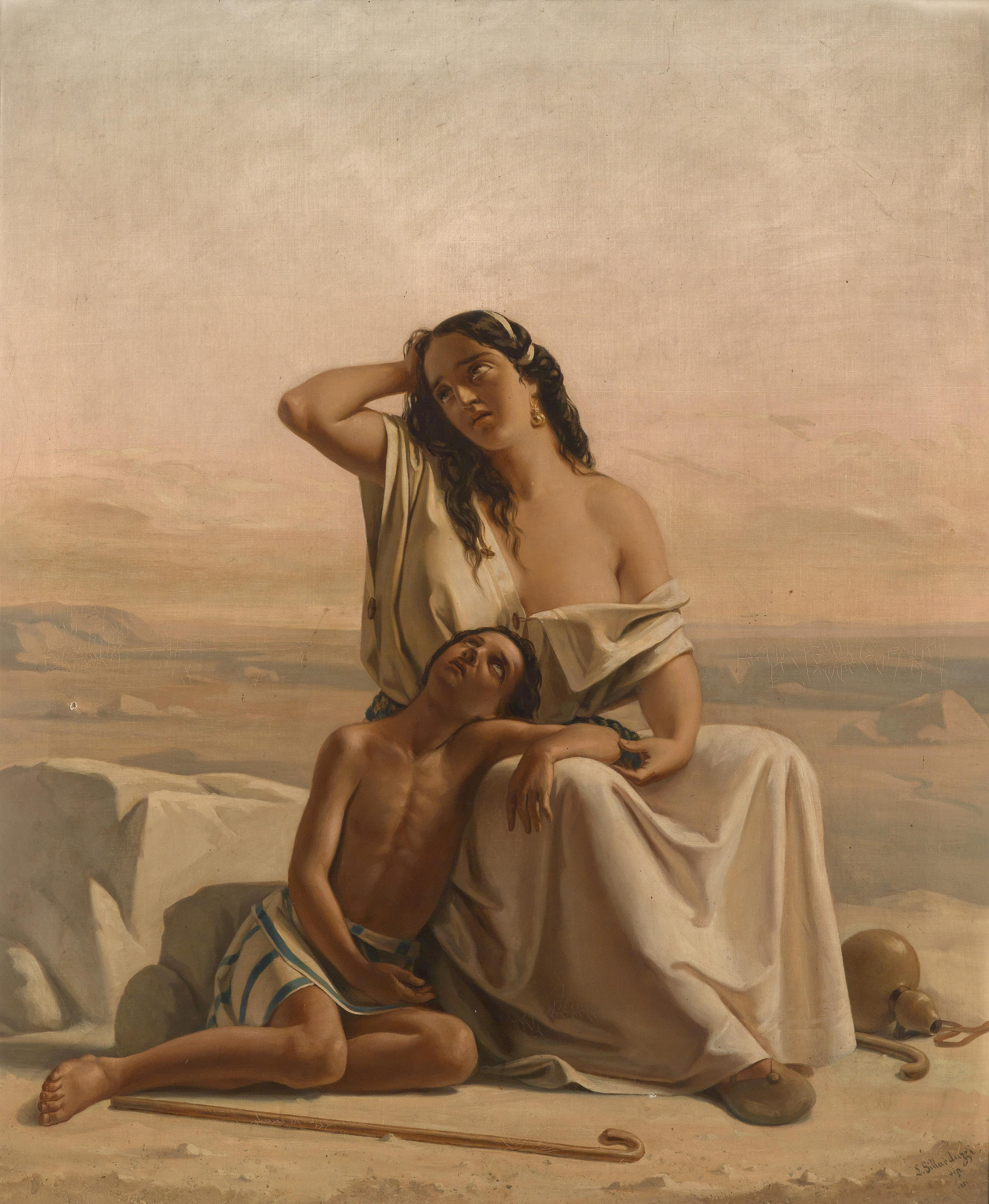
Hagar and Ishmael in the Desert (1851)

He was born in Cortina d'Ampezzo. After studying design in Innsbruck, he attended the Academy of Venice. In 1846 he moved to Vienna. There in 1853 he exhibited: a Holy Family and Angels, The Flood, and The Bells of St. Mark announce the election of the Doge Foscari. The Ferdinandeum Museum in Innsbruck has the latter painting and The Venetian fisherman. He painted a Deposition in Nazarene style for the parish church of Cortina d'Ampezzo. He died in Vienna in 1856.
