= Pocol =

- Interactive map of Pocol
- Coordinates: 46°31′34″N 12°06′57″E
- Base elevation: m
- Skiable area: km²
- Lift capacity: skiers/h

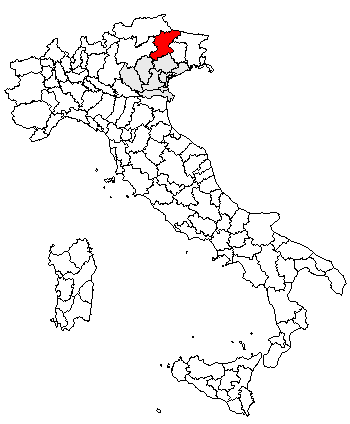
Location of the province of Belluno

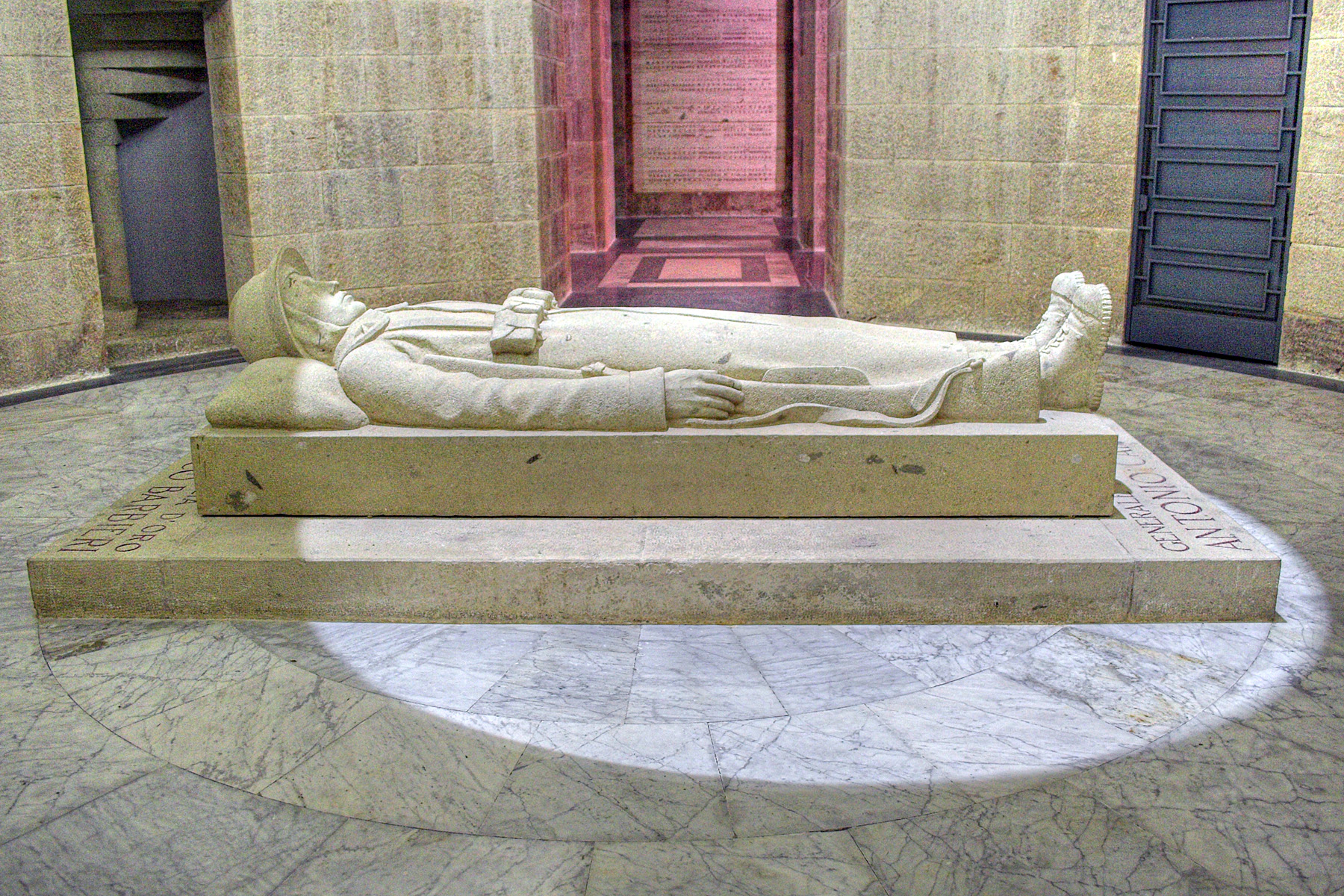
Tomb of General Antonio Cantore in Pocol cemetery

Pocol is a village and ski resort in the Veneto region of northeast Italy. The village is a località of the comune of Cortina d'Ampezzo, in the province of Belluno.

== Geography ==
Pocol lies in the Dolomites, at 1,535 meters above sea level.

== History ==
Pocol also has a war cemetery established in 1935 which contains the remains of 9,707 Italian soldiers (4,455 unknown) and 37 Austrians.

== Economy ==
Pocol is a popular area for skiing and snowboarding.
