= Castello de Zanna =

Coordinates: 46.546735°N 12.132794°E

The Castello de Zanna is a small fortress, situated in the frazione of Majon, in the comune of Cortina d'Ampezzo in the southern (Dolomitic) Alps of the Veneto region of Northern Italy. It consists of low, white outer walls and two white corner towers, with a small chapel dedicated to the Holy Trinity. The construction of the castle began in 1694, but on August 19, 1696, work was interrupted; the building remained unfinished in 1809 when it was burned by French revolutionary troops who had invaded Ampezzo. Since then the castle has undergone restoration.
