= Luigi Ghedina (painter) =

Italian decorative painter and decorator

Luigi Ghedina (1829–1900) was an Italian decorative painter and decorator. A native of Cortina d'Ampezzo, he is perhaps best known for his frescoes on the ceiling of the Basilica Minore dei Santi Filippo e Giacomo of Cortina, "Christ Purifying the Temple", "The Martyrdom of St. Philip and "The Beheading of St. James".

== Bibliography ==
- Robertson, Alexander (1896). Through the Dolomites from Venice to Toblach. London: G. Allen.
