= Basilica Minore dei Santi Filippo e Giacomo =

Catholic basilica in Cortina d'Ampezzo, Italy

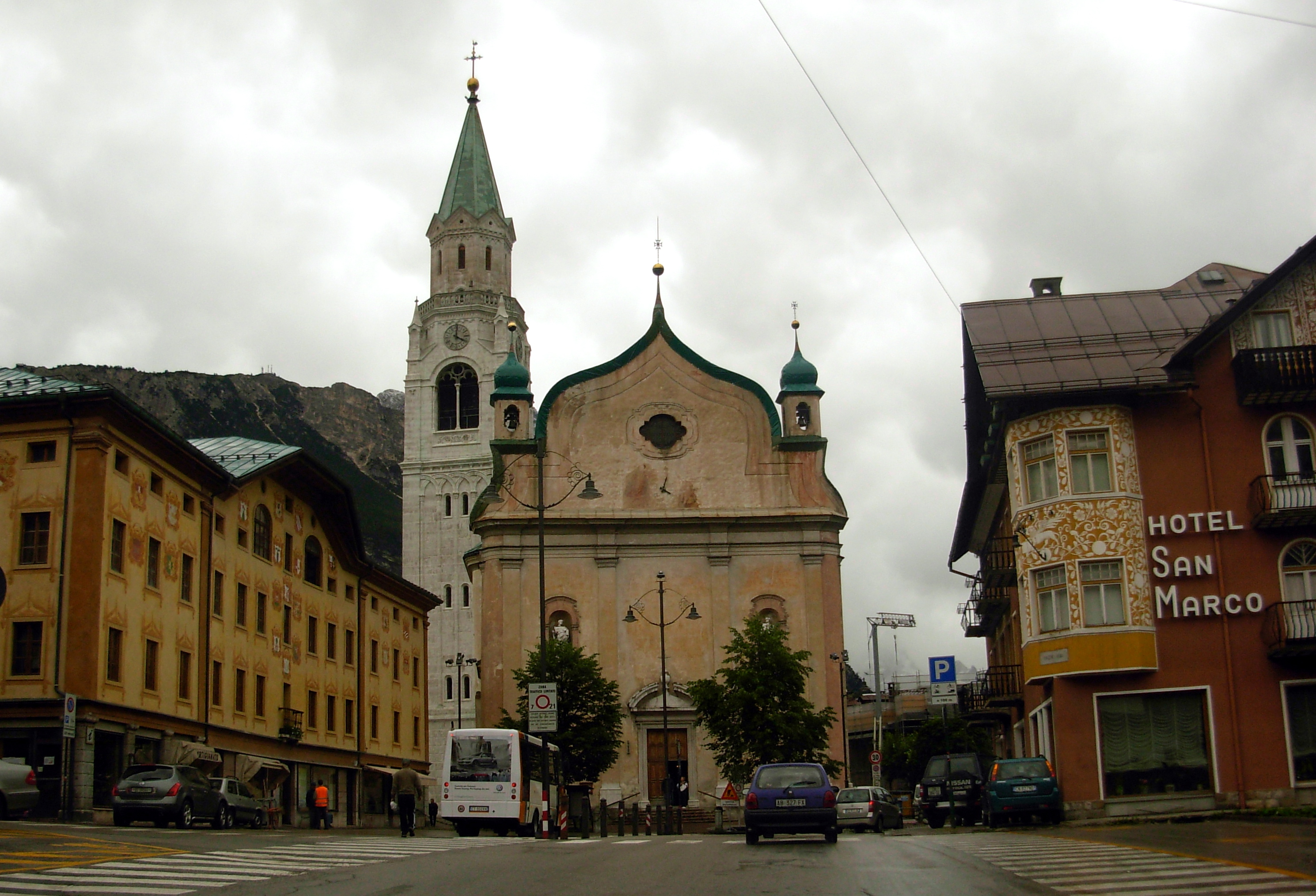
- Basilica Minore dei Santi Filippo e Giacomo
- 46°32′15″N 12°08′11″E
- Denomination: Catholic

Architecture
- Architect: Joseph Promberg
- Style: Baroque
- Years built: 1769-1775

Basilica Minore dei Santi Filippo e Giacomo is a Catholic basilica of the Diocese of Belluno-Feltre, located in Cortina d'Ampezzo, Italy. It is dedicated to the Apostles Philip and James, patron saint of Cortina d'Ampezzo. It is the home of the parish and the deanery of Cortina d'Ampezzo. Built between 1769 and 1775 in the Baroque style to a design by the architect Joseph Promperg, it sits on the site where two previous churches had existed from the 13th and 16th centuries.

== Sources ==
- AA. VV., Pietre Vive, Edizioni La Cooperativa di Cortina, Cortina d'Ampezzo, 2011. (in Italian)
- Karl Wolfsgruber, La Chiesa Parrocchiale dei SS. Filippo e Giacomo di Cortina d'Ampezzo, Foto Ghedina, Cortina d'Ampezzo, 1975. (in Italian)
