= Zanna (surname) =

Zanna is a surname. Notable people with the surname include:

- Ahmed Zanna (1955–2015), Nigerian politician
- Antonella Zanna, Italian-Norwegian mathematician
- Francesco De Zanna (1905–1989), Italian bobsledder
- Mark Zanna (1944–2020), Canadian social psychologist
- Talib Zanna (born 1990), Nigerian basketball player in the Israel Basketball Premier League
