= Luigi Ghedina (mountain climber) =

Italian mountaineer (1924–2009)

Luigi Ghedina (1924–2009) was an Italian mountain climber. A native of Cortina d'Ampezzo, he was noted for his feats at climbing the local Dolomite peaks such as Tofana, Lagazuoi and Pomagagnon in the 1940s and 1950s. He began climbing in 1939 at the age of 15, at a time when climbing without assistance had become more common. One of his first major achievements was ascending Becco di Mezzodì in 1942.
