= Sass de Stria =

Mountain in Italy

Coordinates: 46°31′16″N 11°59′49″E

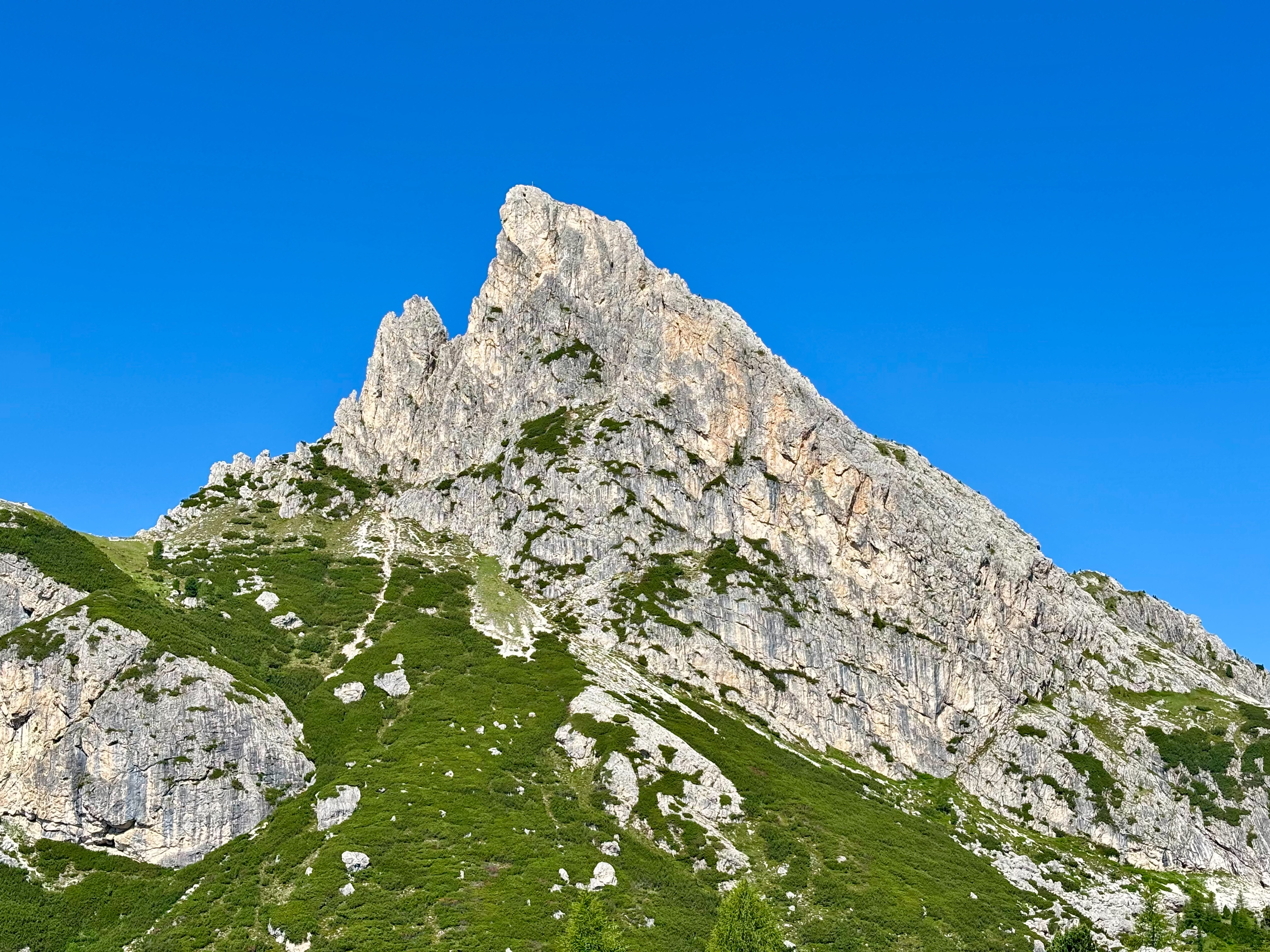

Highest point
- Elevation: 2,477 m (8,127 ft)
- Isolation: 0.89 km (0.55 mi)

Geography
- Location: Veneto, Italy

Sass de Stria is a mountain of the Veneto, Italy. It has an elevation of 2,477 meters. During the First World War, the mountain and surrounding area was the scene of fighting between Italy and Austria-Hungary.
