= Monte Formin =

Mountain in Italy

- Ponta Lastoi de Formin
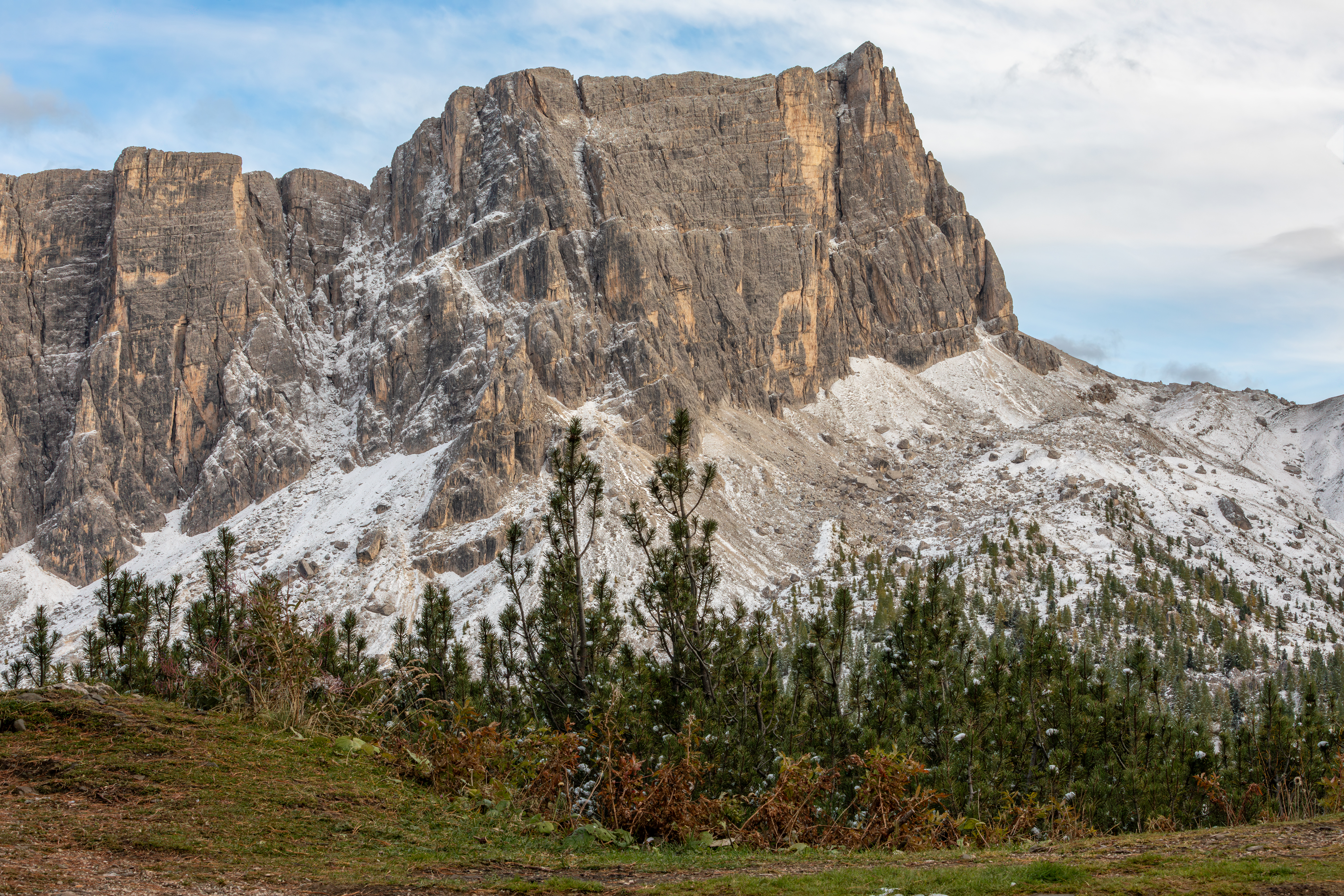
- Northwest aspect

Highest point
- Elevation: 2,657 m (8,717 ft)
- Prominence: 195 m (640 ft)
- Parent peak: Cima Ambrizzola
- Isolation: 1.54 km (0.96 mi)
- Coordinates: 46°28′27″N 12°04′46″E

Geography
- Location within Italy
- Interactive map of Monte Formin
- Country: Italy
- Province: Belluno
- Parent range: Dolomites; Ampezzo Dolomites
- Topo map: Tabacco 03 Cortina d’Ampezzo e Dolomiti Ampezzane

Geology
- Rock age: Triassic
- Rock type: Dolomite

Monte Formin is a mountain in the Province of Belluno in Italy.

== Description ==
Monte Formin, also known as Ponta Lastoi de Formin, is a 2,657-meter-elevation (8,717-foot) summit situated southeast of Giau Pass in the Dolomites. Set in the Veneto region, the peak is located eight kilometers (5 miles) south-southwest of the town of Cortina d'Ampezzo. Precipitation runoff from the mountain drains into tributaries of the Piave. Topographic relief is significant as the summit rises 1,200 meters (3,937 feet) above the hamlet of Santa Fosca in three kilometers (1.86 miles). The nearest higher neighbor is Cima Ambrizzola, 1.54 kilometers (0.96 mile) to the east-northeast.

== Climate ==
Based on the Köppen climate classification, Monte Formin is located in an alpine climate zone with long, cold winters, and short, mild summers. Weather systems are forced upwards by the mountains (orographic lift), causing moisture to drop in the form of rain and snow. The months of June through September offer the most favorable weather for visiting or climbing in this area.

== Climbing ==
Established climbing routes with first ascents:

- Gran Diedro: Spigolo West – 1974 – G. Buzzi, G. Calzi, R. Priolo, N. Zeper
- Via Bonetti-Mezzacasa – 1977 – F. Bonetti, L. Mezzacasa
- Via della Rampa – 1980 – M. Pradel, M. Savio, R. Daniele
- Spiz de Mondeval – 1986 – K. Hoi, H. Nau
- Super Tegolina – 1999 – F. Piardi, F. Tremolada
- Gente di mare – 2005 – Marco Sterni, Mauro Florit

== Gallery ==
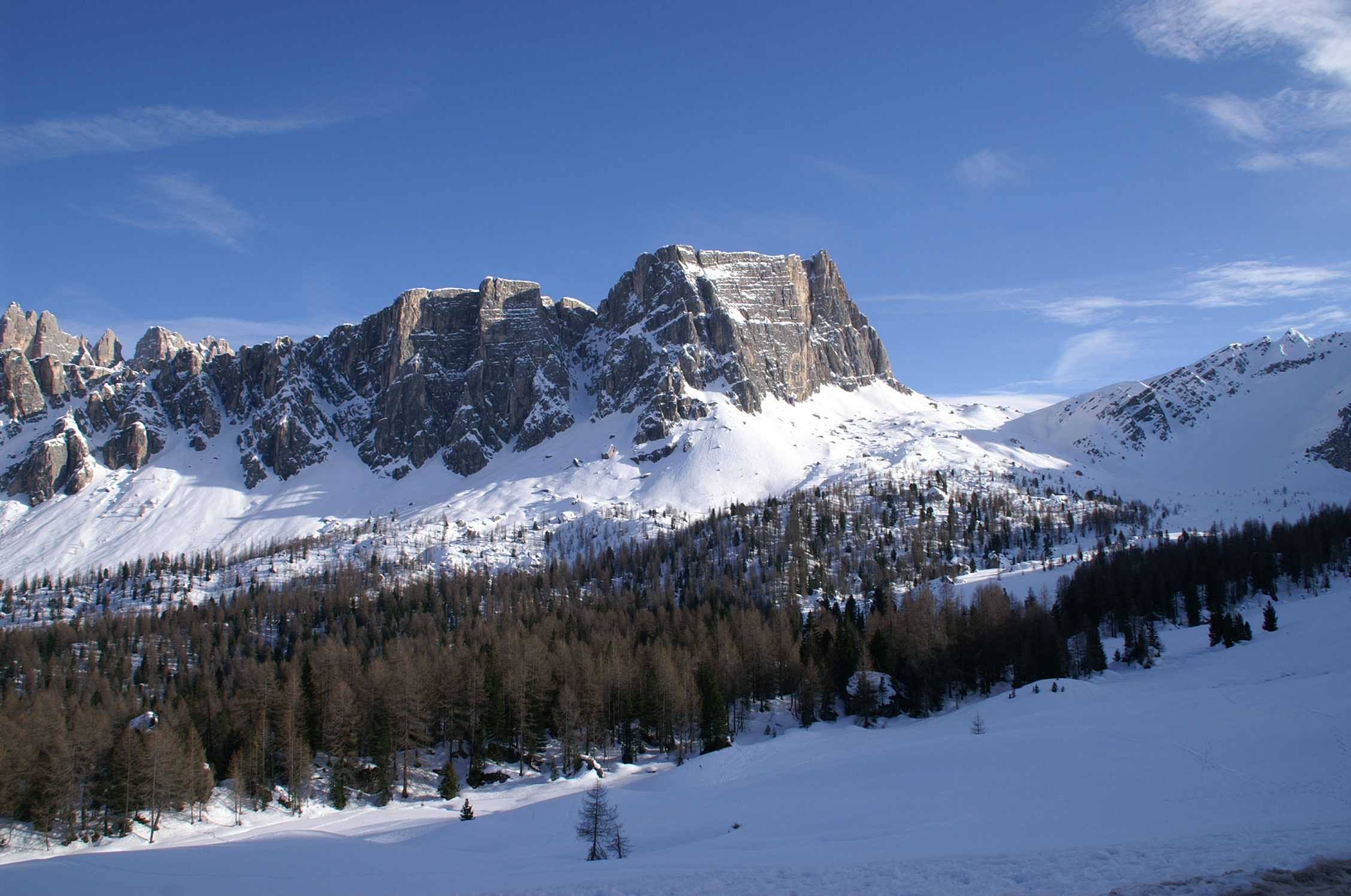

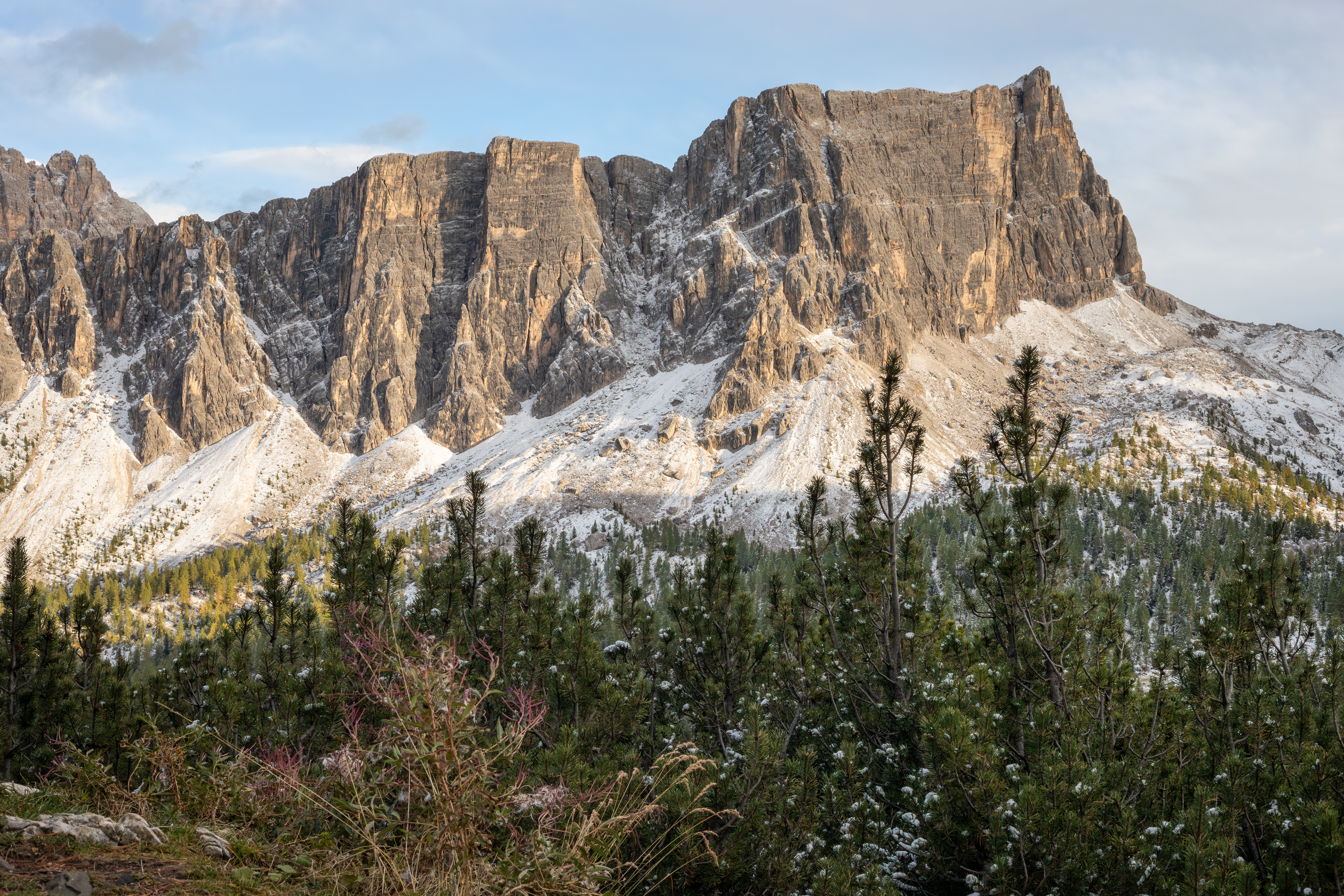
Northwest side

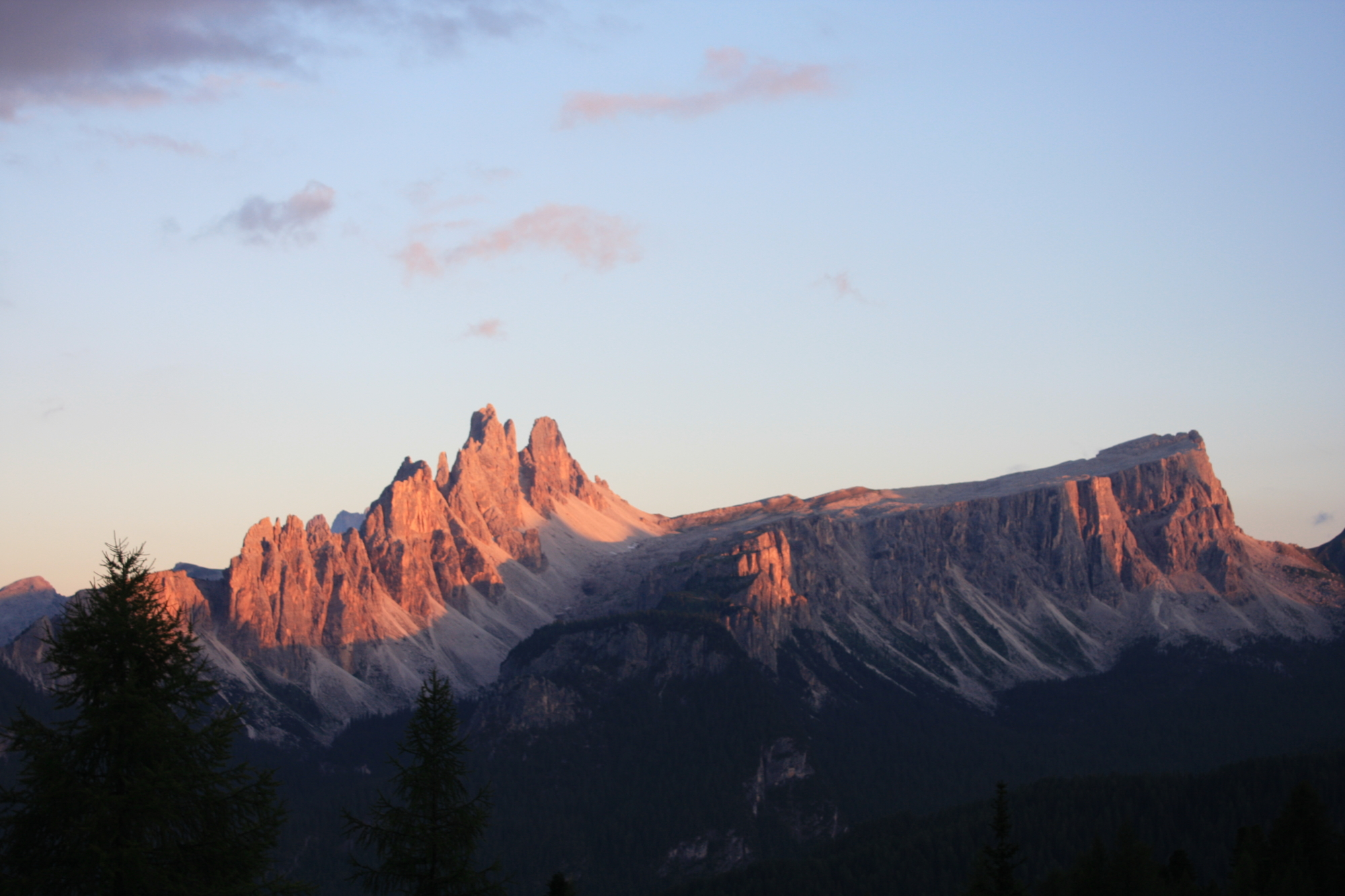
Croda da Lago / Cima Ambrizzola (left) and Monte Formin (right) from NNW

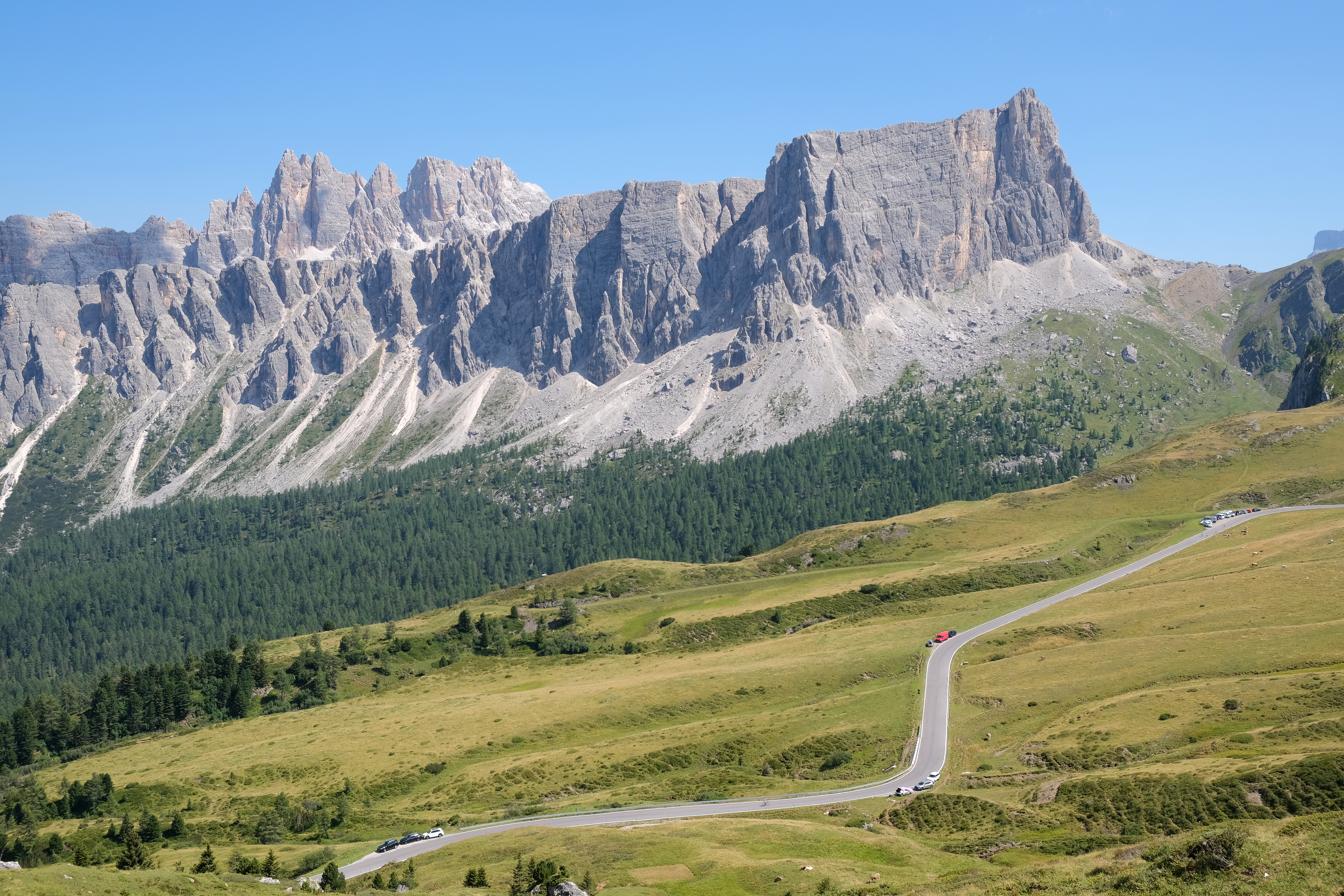
Monte Formin to the right

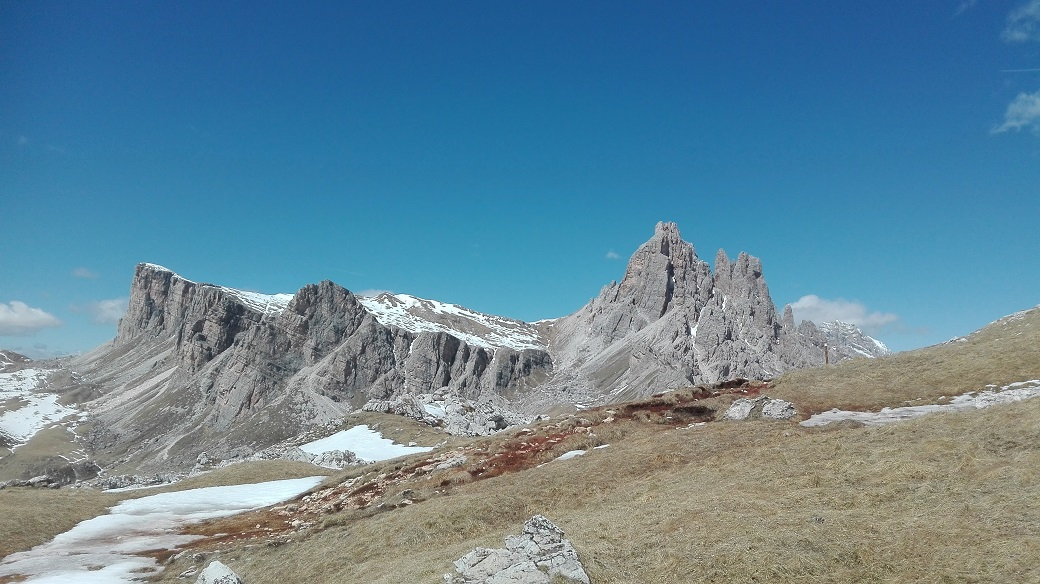
South aspect of Monte Formin (left), with Cima Ambrizzola (right)

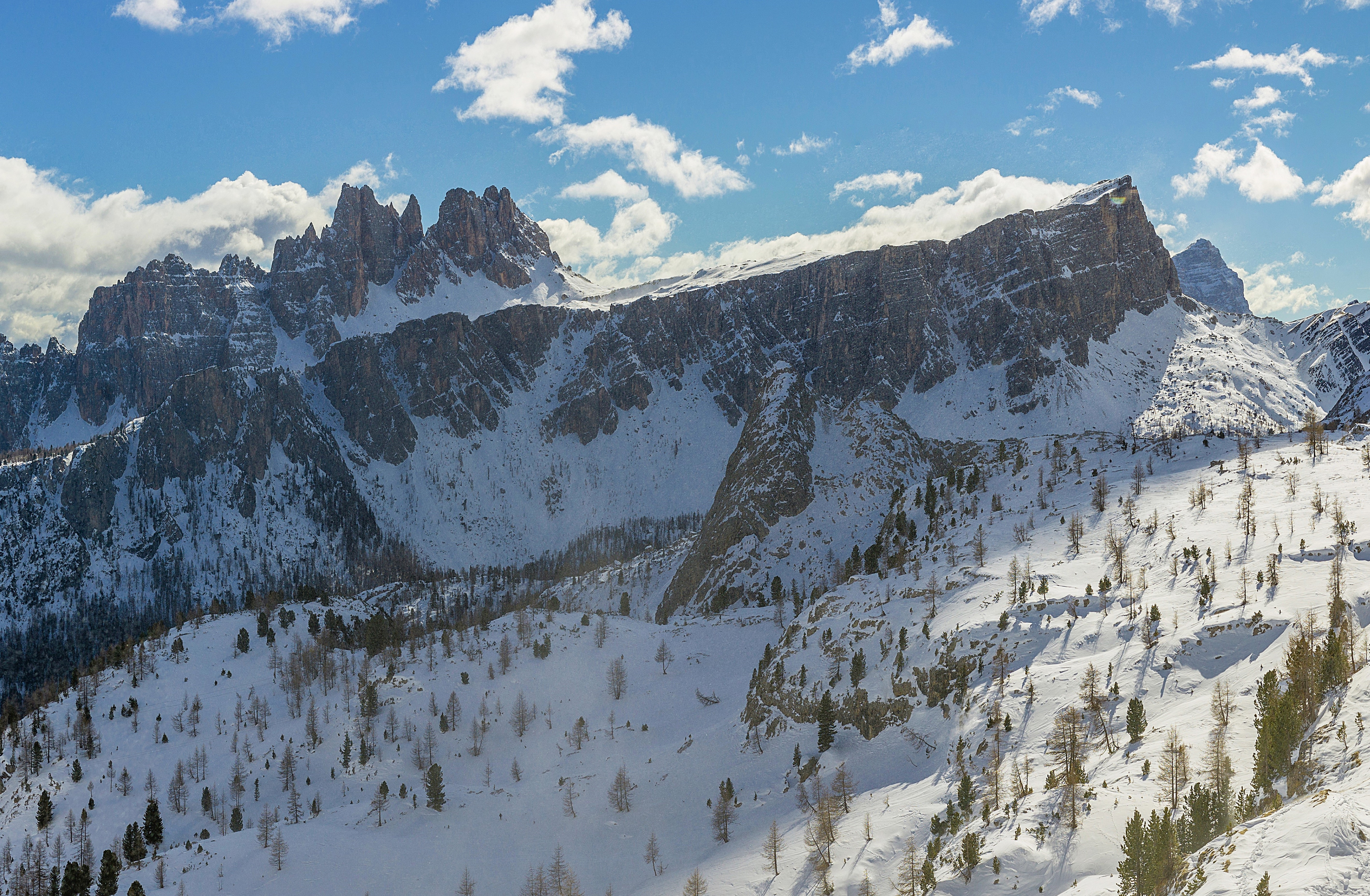
Cima Ambrizzola / Croda da Lago (left) and Monte Formin (right) from NNW

== See also ==
- Southern Limestone Alps
