= Cinque Torri =

Mountain in Italy

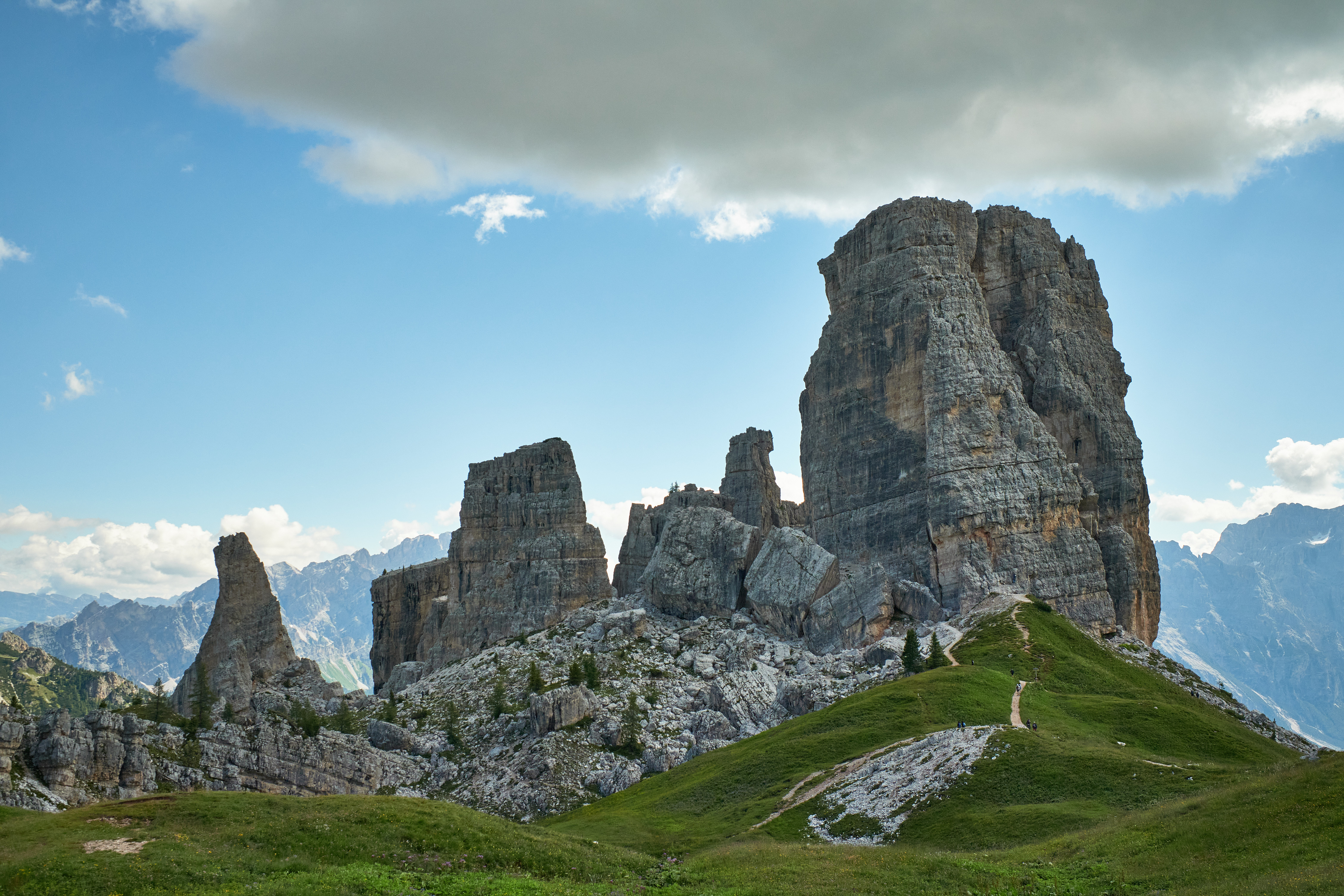

Highest point
- Elevation: 2,361 m (7,746 ft)
- Coordinates: 46°30′37″N 12°03′07″E

Geography
- Location within Alps
- Location: Province of Belluno, Italy
- Parent range: Dolomites

Climbing
- First ascent: July 15, 1930 by P. Dallamano and R. Ghirardini

Cinque Torri ("Five Towers", sometimes named also Cinque Torri di Averau; German: Fünf Türme) comprise a small rock formation belonging to Nuvolao group in the Dolomiti Ampezzane (part of the Eastern Dolomites) northwest of San Vito di Cadore and southwest of Cortina d'Ampezzo.

== Description ==
Cinque Torri, as all the other mountains in the area, are made of dolomite, with a particular pale grey colour. The group is formed by five towers (which give the name to the mountain) with a maximum elevation of 2,361 m (Torre Grande). Every "tower" has its own name:

- Torre Grande, the highest one has three very appealing peaks for rock climbers: Cima Nord, Cima Sud e Cima Ovest;
- Torre Seconda, also named Torre del Barancio or Torre Romana;
- Terza Torre, or Torre Latina;
- Quarta Torre, formed by two blocks of rock with different height, respectively called then Torre Quarta Bassa and Torre Quarta Alta;
- Quinta Torre, or Torre Inglese.

They are located in the southwest area of the valley of Cortina d'Ampezzo, north of the Averau mountain, of which Cinque Torri can be considered a part.

== Summer and winter activities ==
In the Cinque Torri area there are the following rifugi (mountain huts):

- Rifugio Cinque Torri, 2,137 m
- Rifugio Scoiattoli, 2,255 m

During summer it is possible to make excursions in the woods and on paths, among which are the Alta Via 1 of the Dolomites, the "Muraglia di Giau" (along the border between comuni of Cortina and San Vito di Cadore, with itineraries toward Nuvolau and Passo Giau, and the historical path in the trenches of the World War I – "Sentiero delle Trincee".

The towers also provide good and popular rock climbing with various routes at a range of grades up all of the towers.

In winter, Cinque Torri belong to an important ski area, whose tracks are part of the wider Dolomiti Superski area. They are thus linked to the nearby mountains Lagazuoi and Col Gallina. Until a few years ago it was possible to ski only towards Lagazuoi – Col Gallina – Cinque Torri, but beginning in the winter season of 2008–2009, it has been also possible to ski downhill from the Cinque Torri area to the higher area of Falzarego Pass by means of the "Croda Negra" lift and the corresponding track beyond Averau mountain.

== History ==
This area was theater of conflict between Italian and Austro-Hungarian troops during World War I; countless testimonies of the fighting and of the war shelters built by the Italian army are present and have been recently rebuilt, to create an open-air museum with historical itineraries.

== See also ==
- Dolomites
- Cortina d'Ampezzo
- Italian front (World War I)
- Nuvolau
