= Monte Cernera =

Mountain in Italy

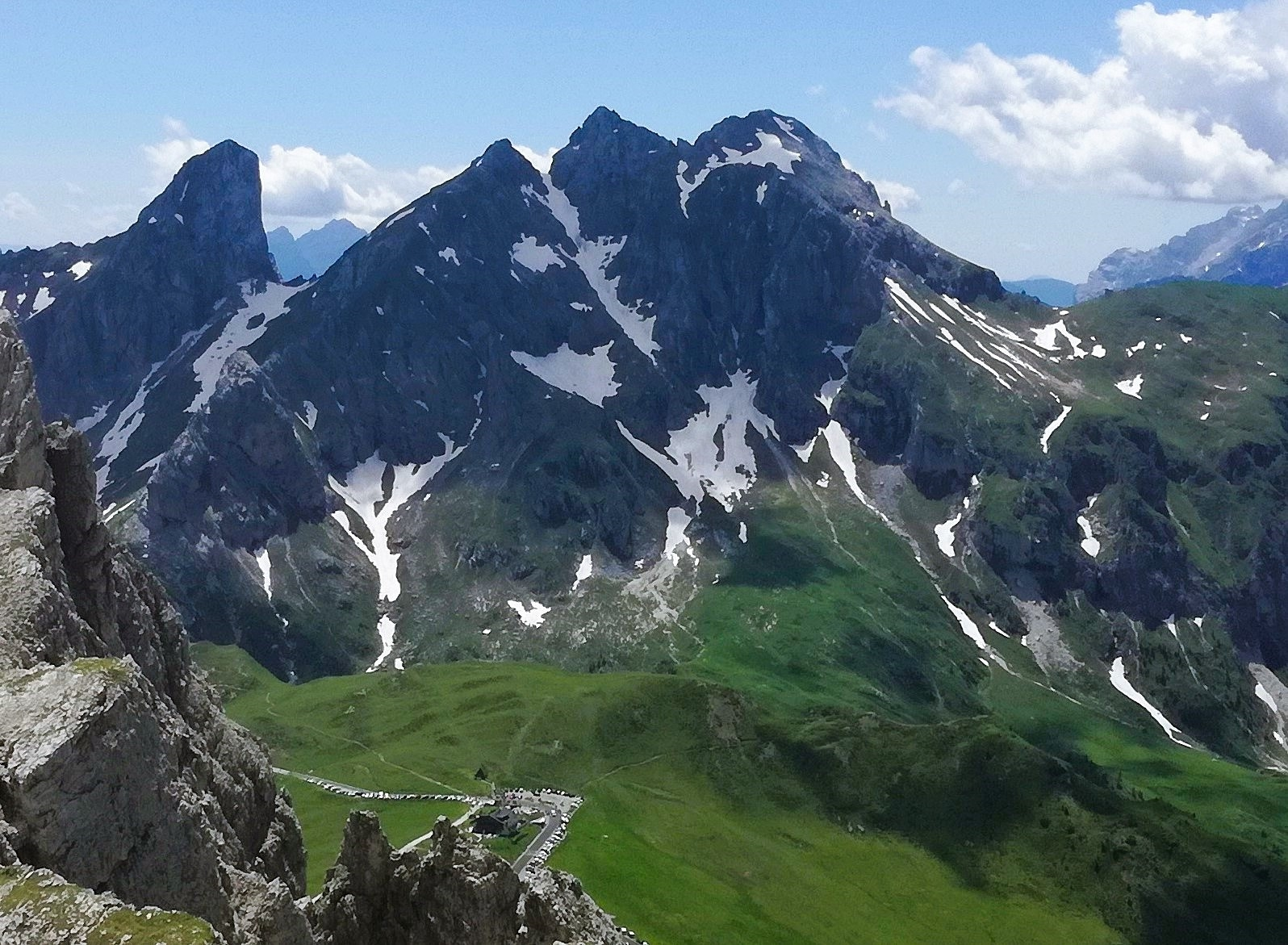
- North aspect

Highest point
- Elevation: 2,664 m (8,740 ft)
- Prominence: 307 m (1,007 ft)
- Parent peak: Cima Ambrizzola
- Isolation: 3.38 km (2.10 mi)
- Coordinates: 46°28′05″N 12°03′29″E

Geography
- Location within Italy
- Interactive map of Monte Cernera
- Country: Italy
- Province: Belluno
- Parent range: Dolomites; Ampezzo Dolomites
- Topo map: Tabacco 03 Cortina d’Ampezzo e Dolomiti Ampezzane

Geology
- Rock age: Triassic
- Rock type: Dolomite

Monte Cernera is a mountain in the Province of Belluno in Italy.

== Description ==
Monte Cernera is a 2,664-meter-elevation (8,740-foot) summit situated south of Giau Pass in the Dolomites. Set in the Veneto region, the peak is located nine kilometers (5.6 miles) southwest of the town of Cortina d'Ampezzo. Precipitation runoff from the mountain drains chiefly into Torrente Cordevole which is a tributary of the Piave, however the northeast slope drains into tributaries of the Boite. Topographic relief is significant as the summit rises 1,300 meters (4,265 feet) above the municipality of Selva di Cadore in two kilometers (1.24 miles). The nearest higher neighbor is Cima Ambrizzola, 3.38 kilometers (2.1 miles) to the east-northeast.

== Climate ==
Based on the Köppen climate classification, Monte Cernera is located in an alpine climate zone with long, cold winters, and short, mild summers. Weather systems are forced upwards by the mountains (orographic lift), causing moisture to drop in the form of rain and snow. The months of June through September offer the most favorable weather for visiting or climbing in this area.

== Gallery ==
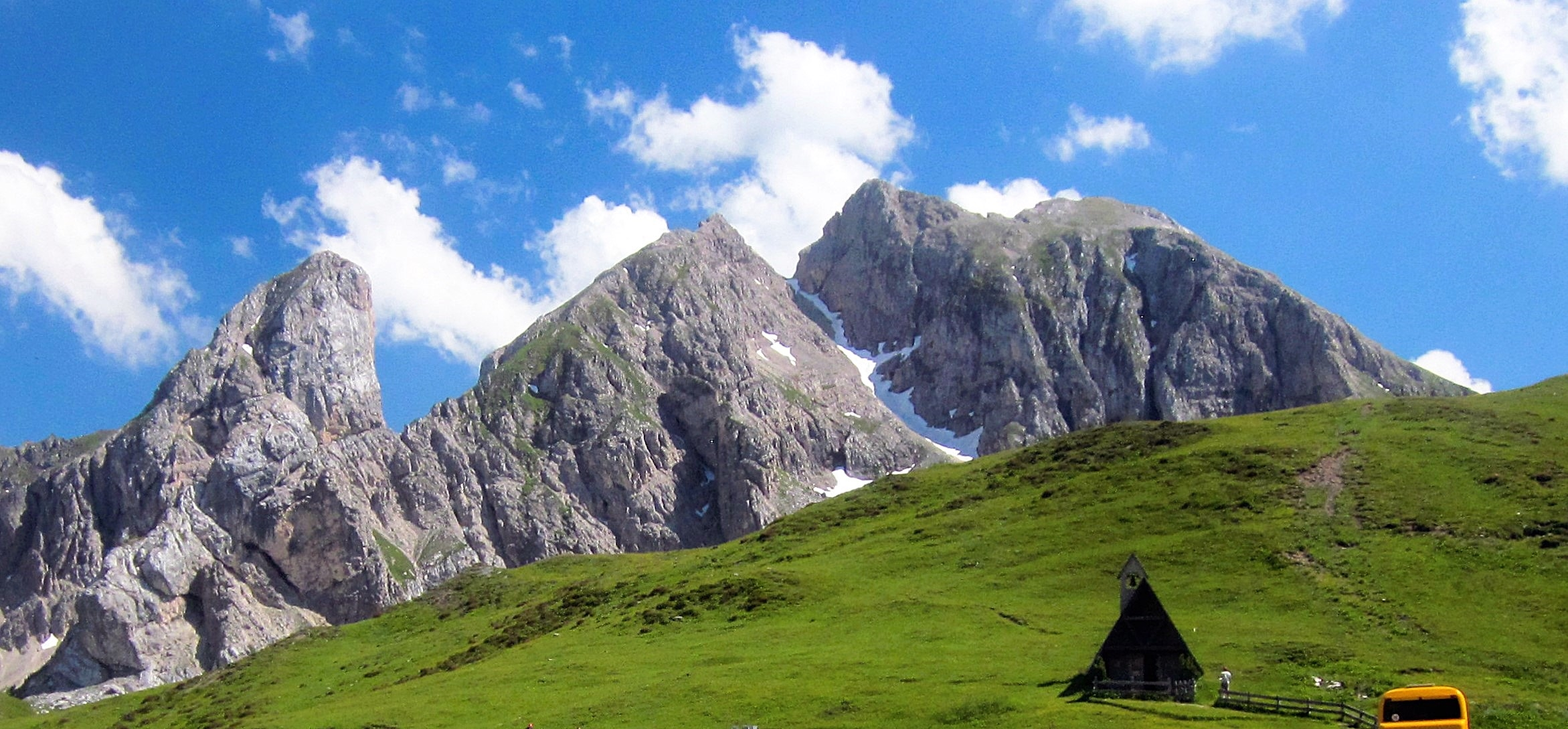
Monte Cernera from Giau Pass

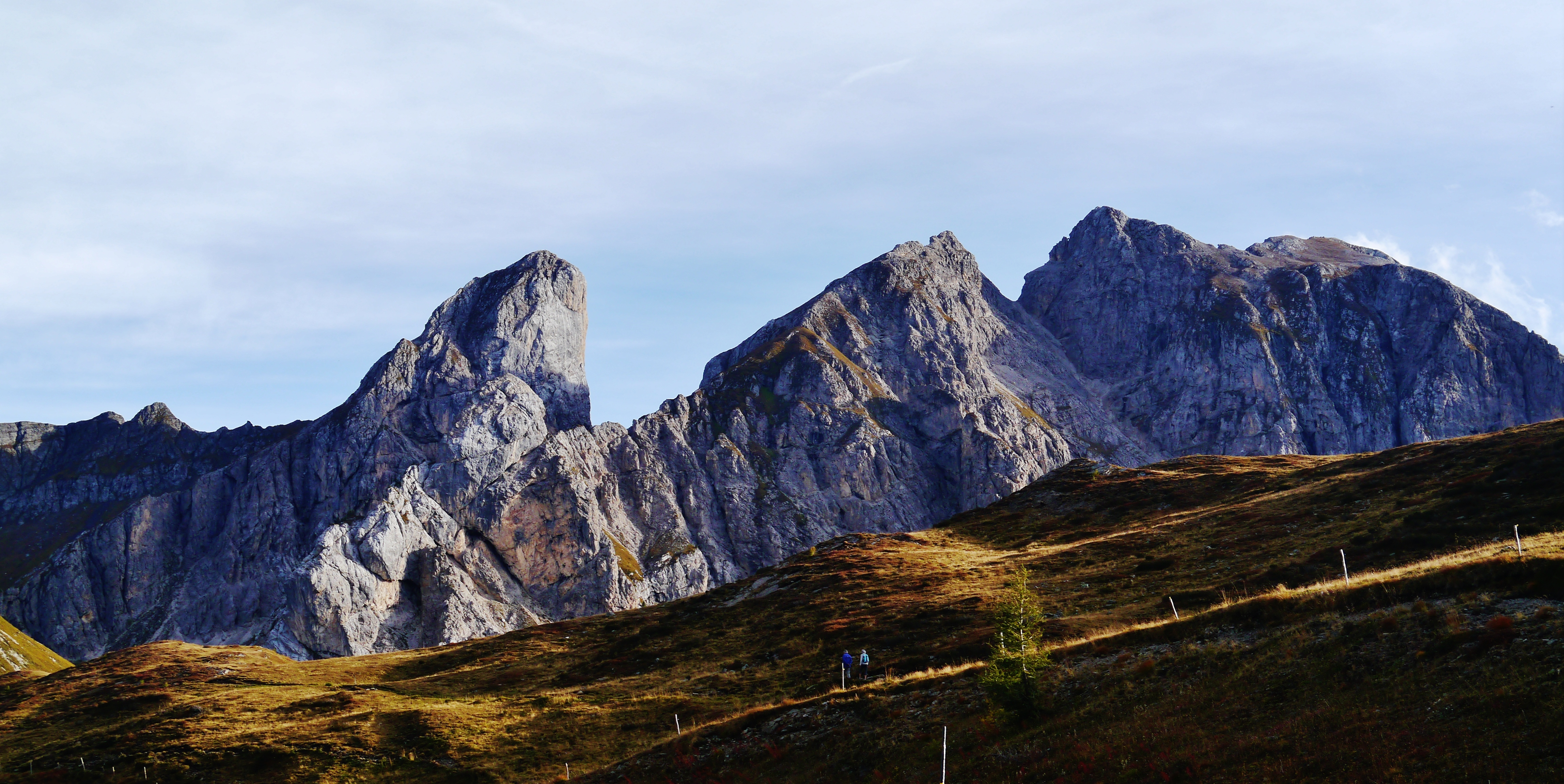

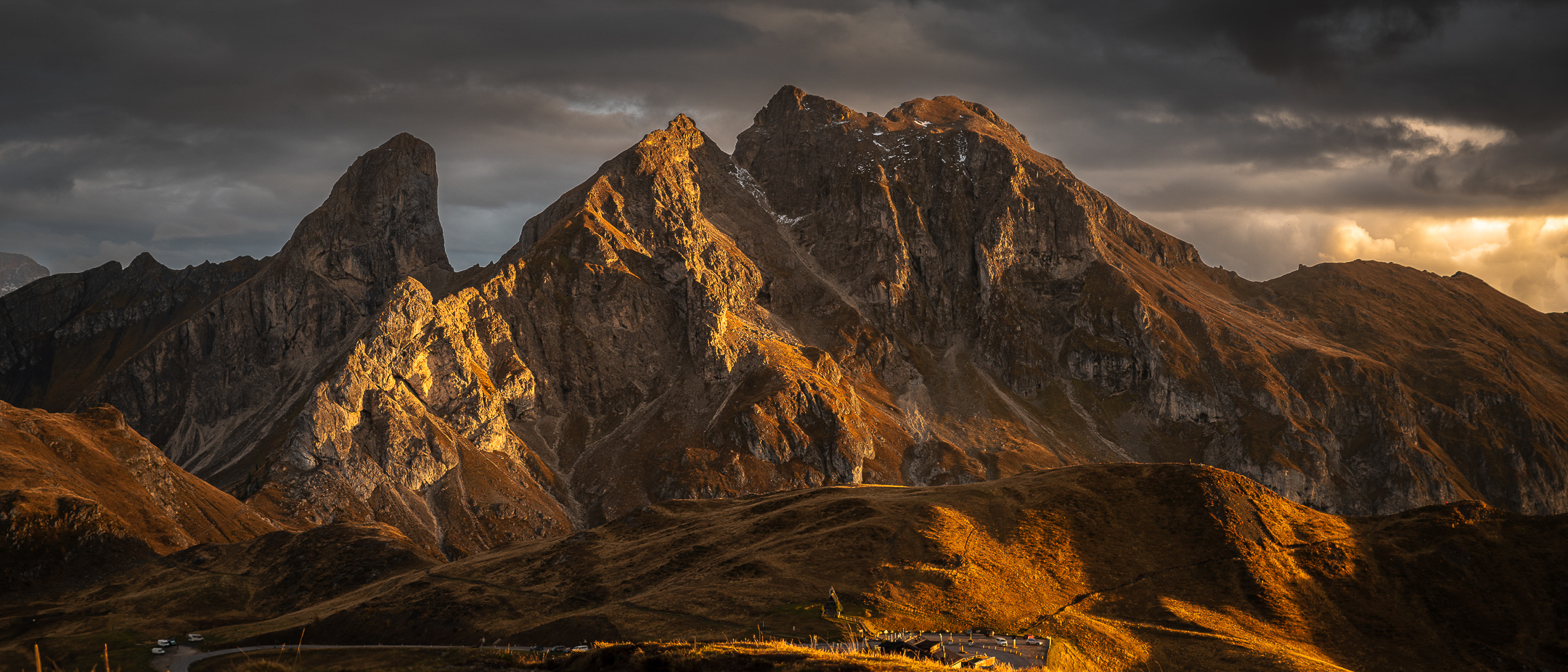

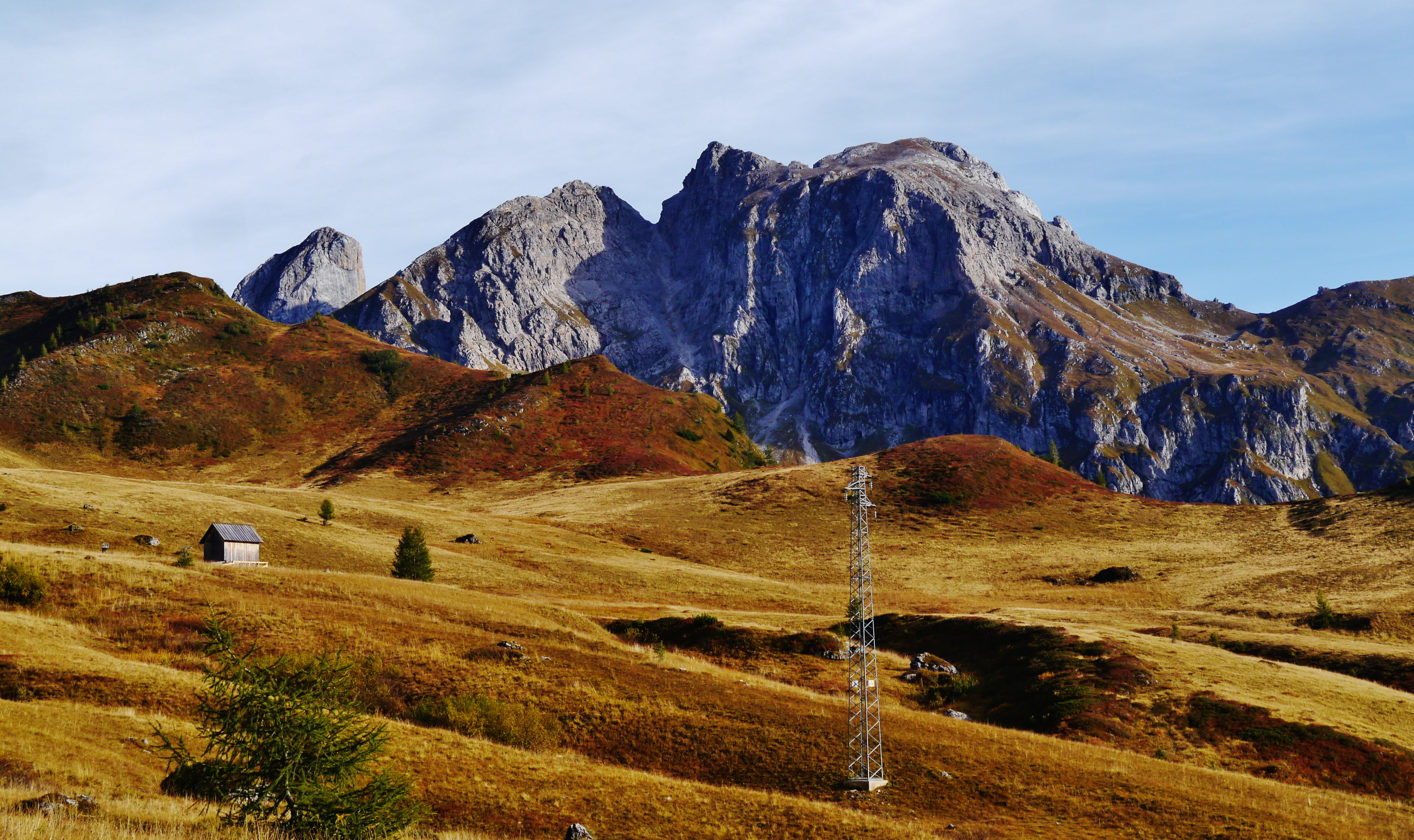

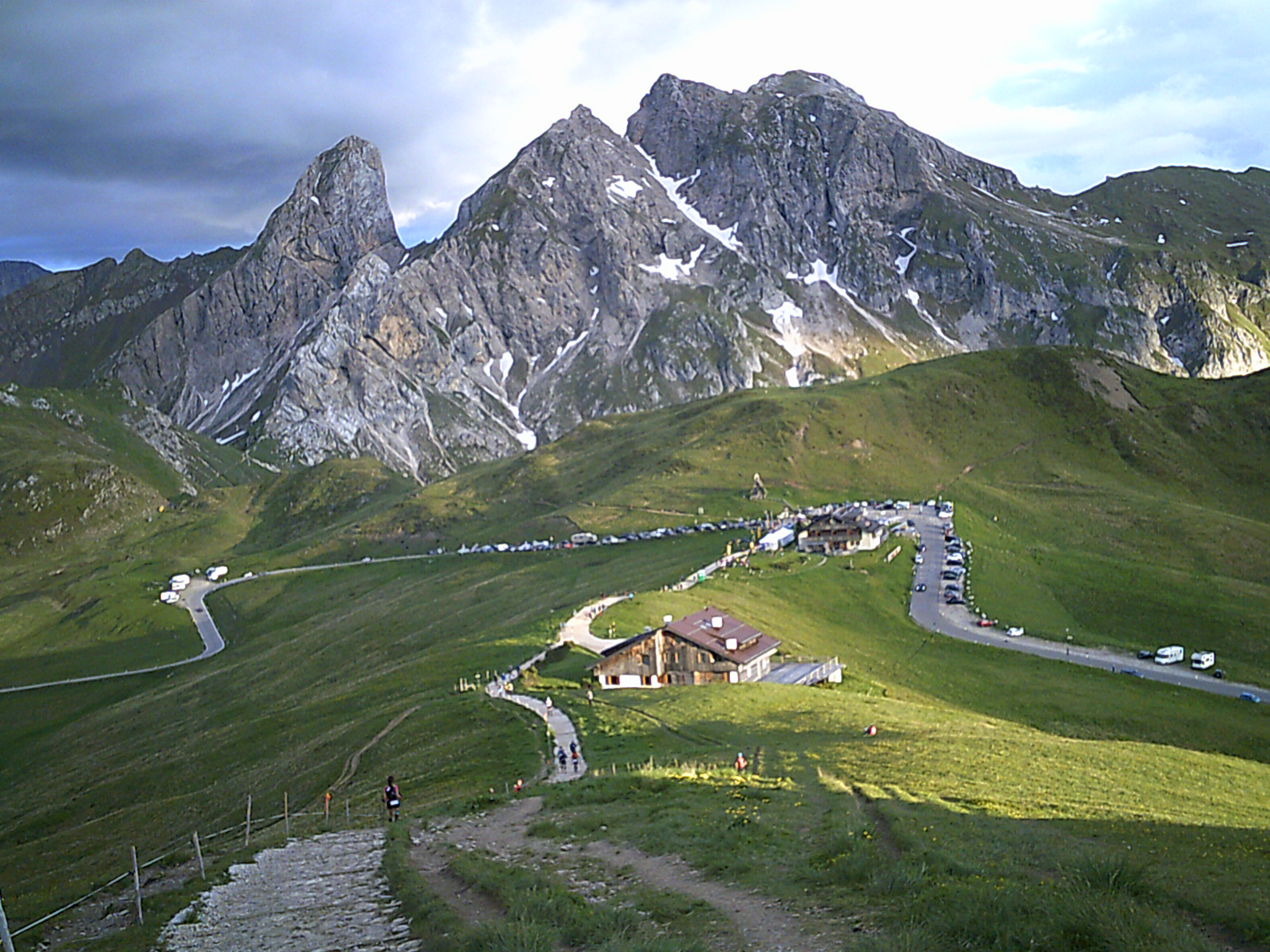
Monte Cernera behind Giau Pass

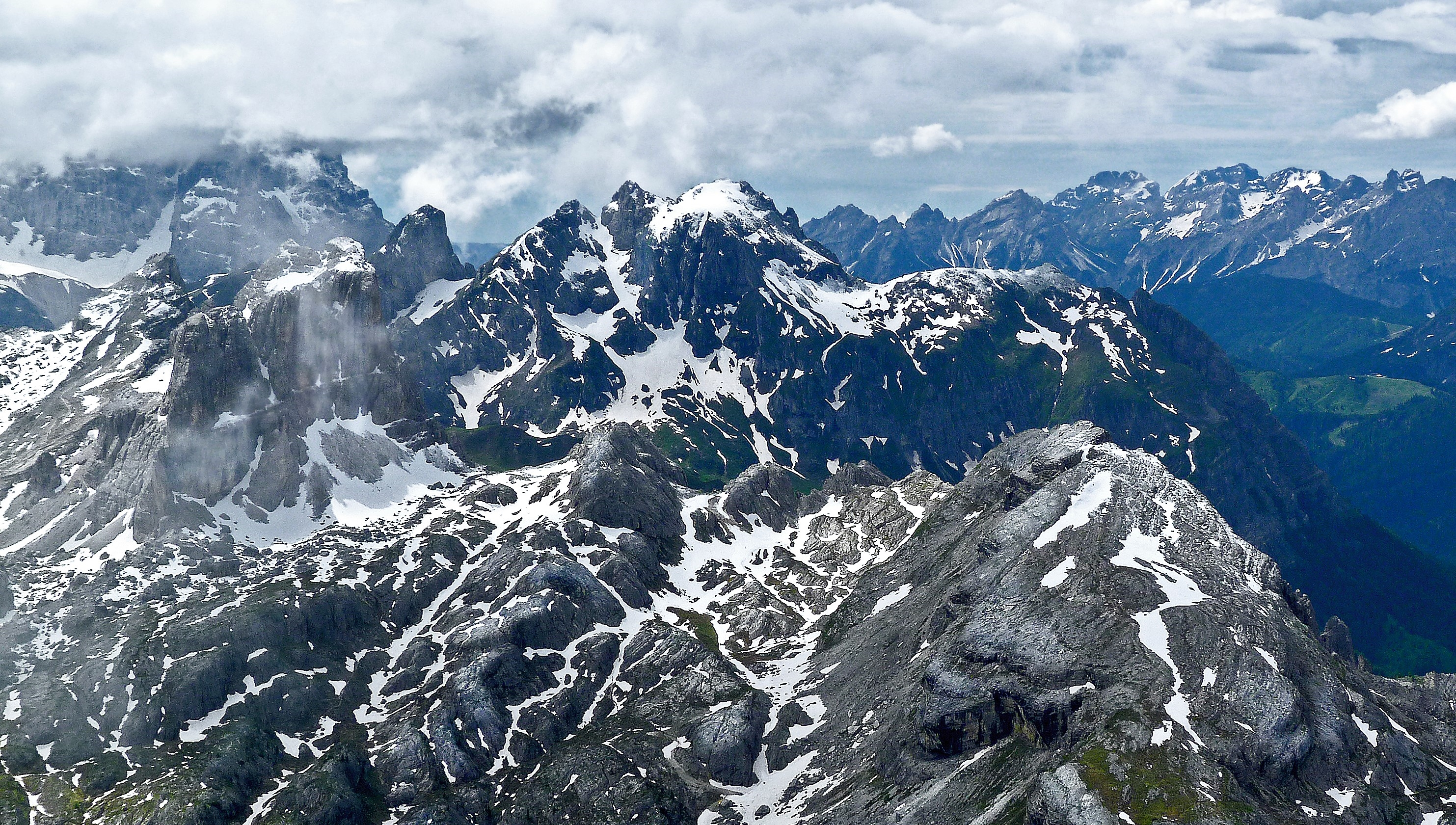
Monte Cernera centered

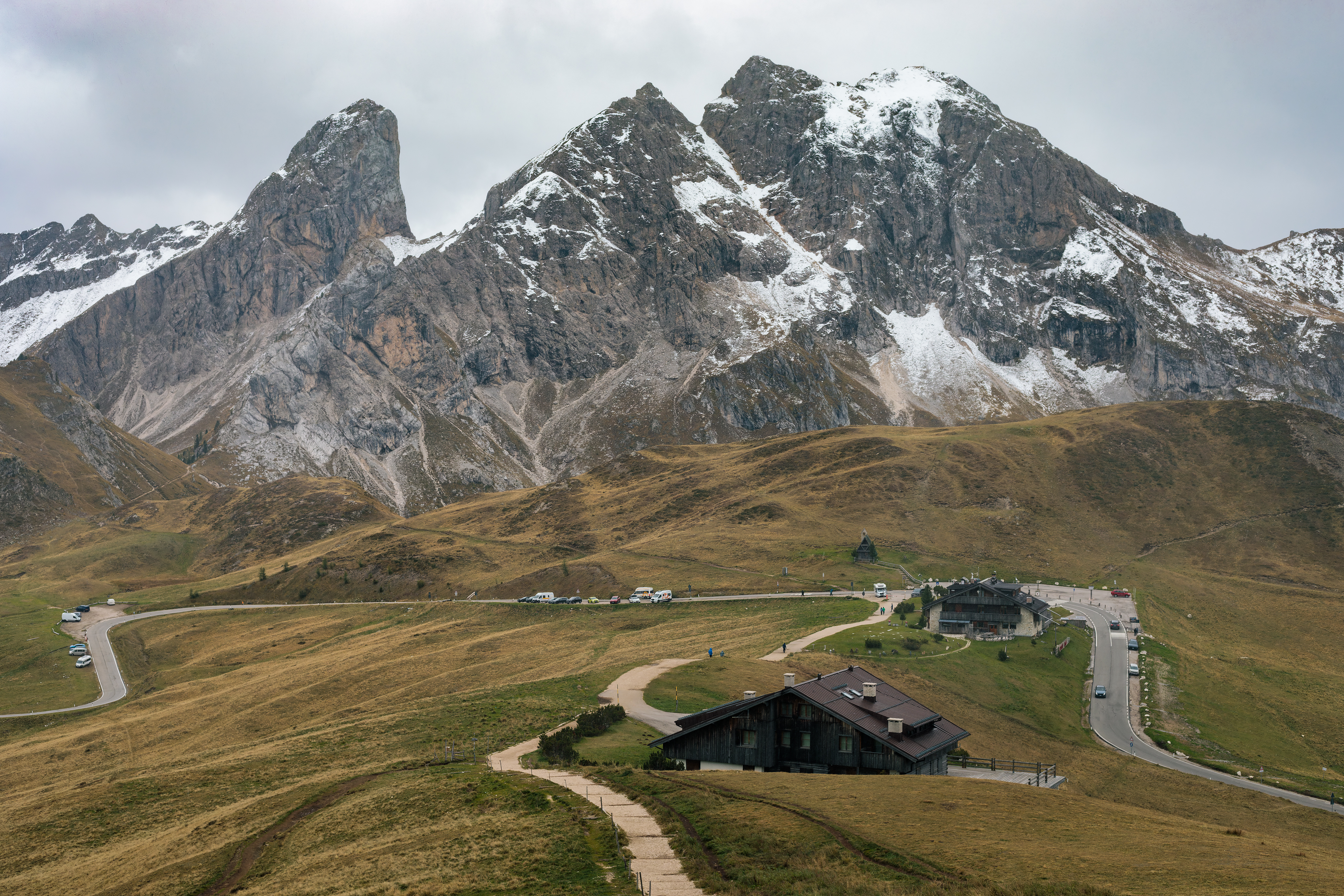

== See also ==
- Southern Limestone Alps
- Croda da Lago
