= Ra Gusela =

Mountain in Italy

- Gusela
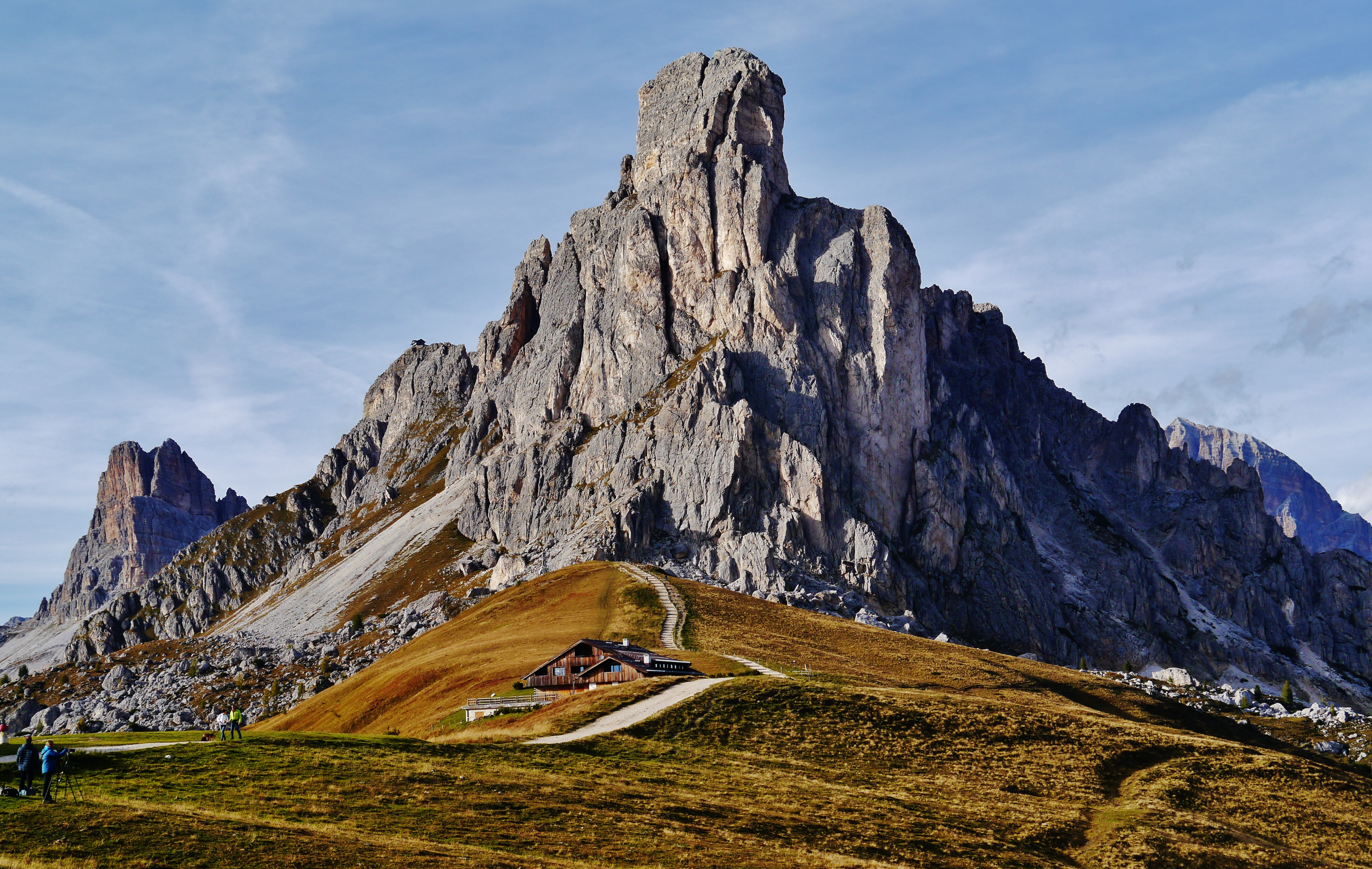
- South aspect

Highest point
- Elevation: 2,595 m (8,514 ft)
- Prominence: 182 m (597 ft)
- Parent peak: Averau
- Isolation: 1.474 km (0.916 mi)
- Coordinates: 46°29′27″N 12°03′02″E

Naming
- Etymology: The Spindle

Geography
- Location within Italy
- Interactive map of Ra Gusela
- Country: Italy
- Province: Belluno
- Parent range: Dolomites; Nuvolau Group
- Topo map: Tabacco 03 Cortina d’Ampezzo e Dolomiti Ampezzane

Geology
- Rock age: Triassic
- Rock type: Dolomite

Ra Gusela is a mountain in the Province of Belluno in Italy.

== Description ==
Ra Gusela is a 2,595-meter-elevation (8,514-foot) summit which ranks as the second-highest peak in the Nuvolau Group of the Dolomites. Set in the Veneto region, the peak is located eight kilometers (5 miles) southwest of the town of Cortina d'Ampezzo. Gusela is the photogenic landmark that towers above Giau Pass. Precipitation runoff from the mountain drains southwest into Torrente Cordevole which is a tributary of the Piave, whereas the northeast slope drains into tributaries of the Boite. Topographic relief is significant as the summit rises 800 meters (2,625 feet) along the southwest slope in 1.5 kilometers (0.93 mile). The nearest higher neighbor is Averau, 1.474 kilometers (0.916 mile) to the northwest. The mountain's descriptive toponym translates from Ladin language as "the spindle." In the 1800s, the peak was known as "Monte Gusella."

== Climate ==
Based on the Köppen climate classification, Ra Gusela is located in an alpine climate zone with long, cold winters, and short, mild summers. Weather systems are forced upwards by the mountains (orographic lift), causing moisture to drop in the form of rain and snow. The months of June through September offer the most favorable weather for visiting or climbing in this area.

== Gallery ==
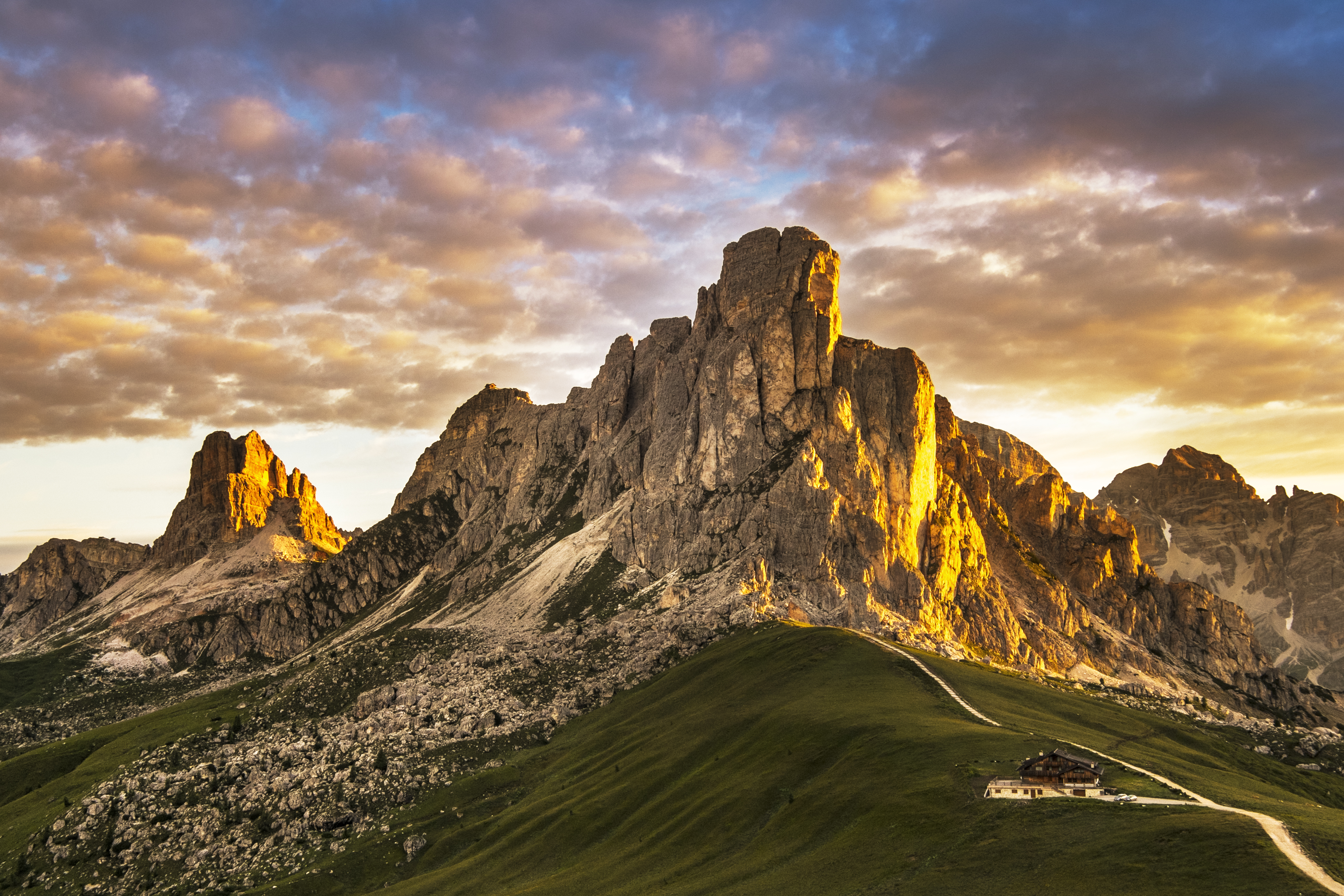

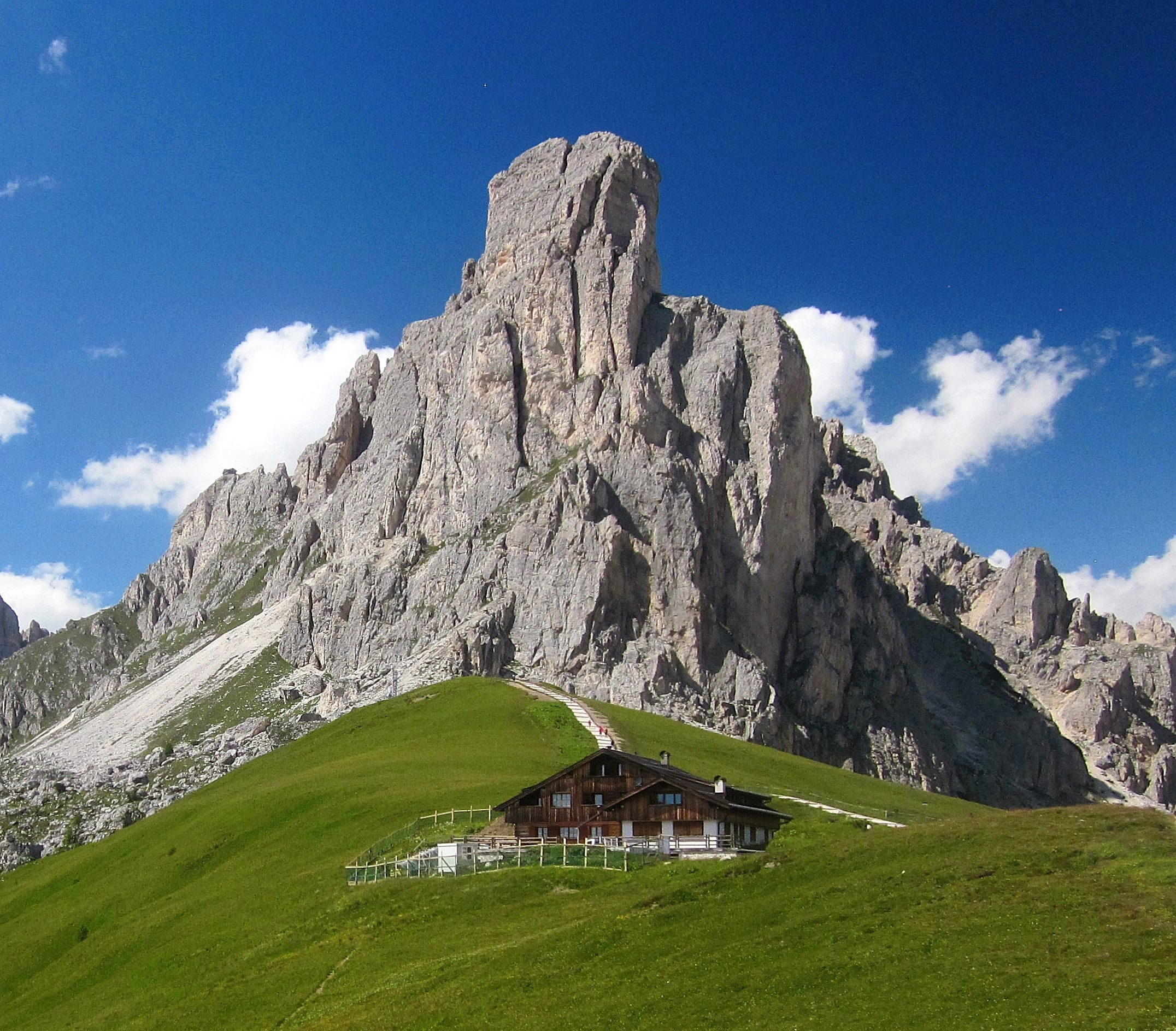

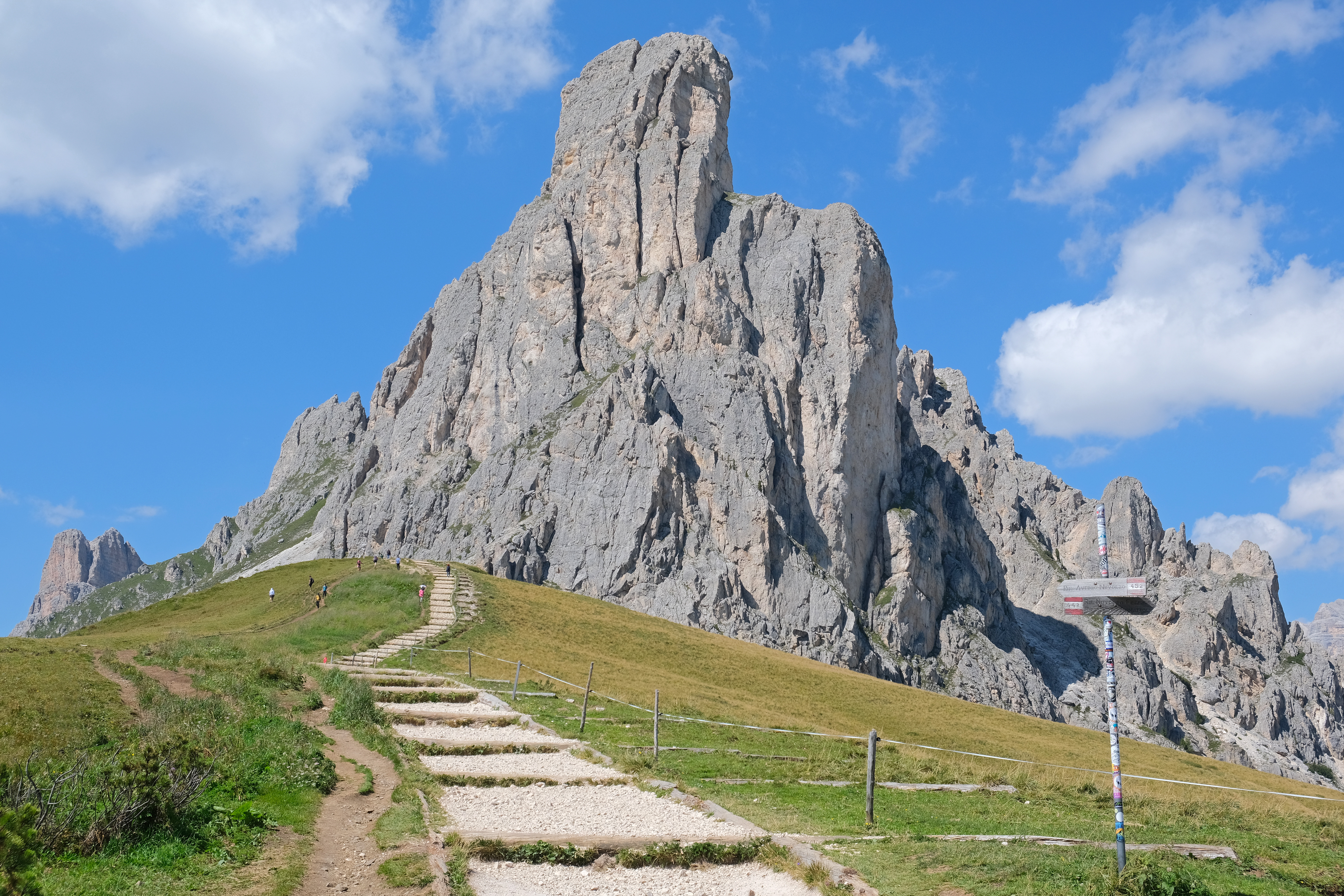

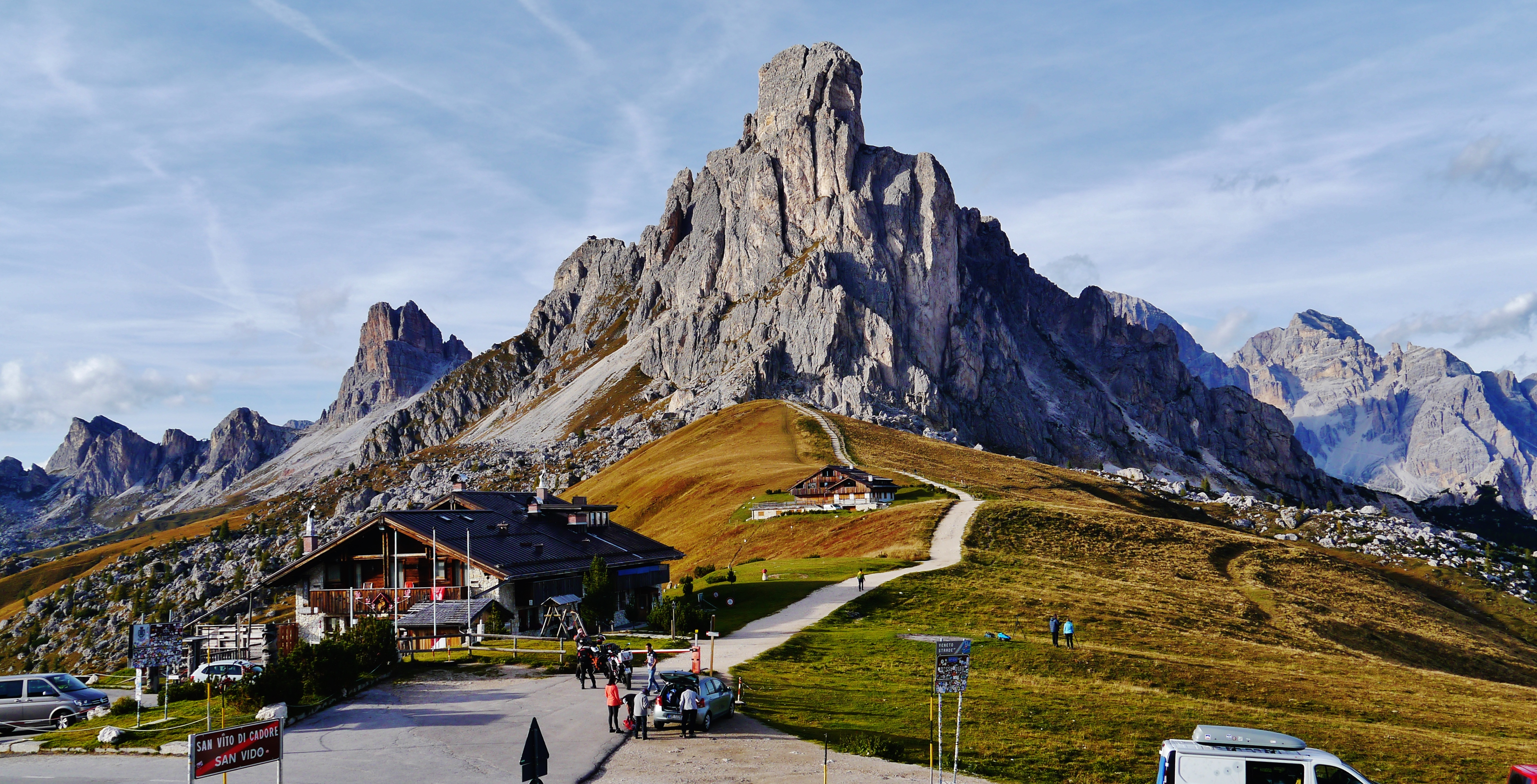

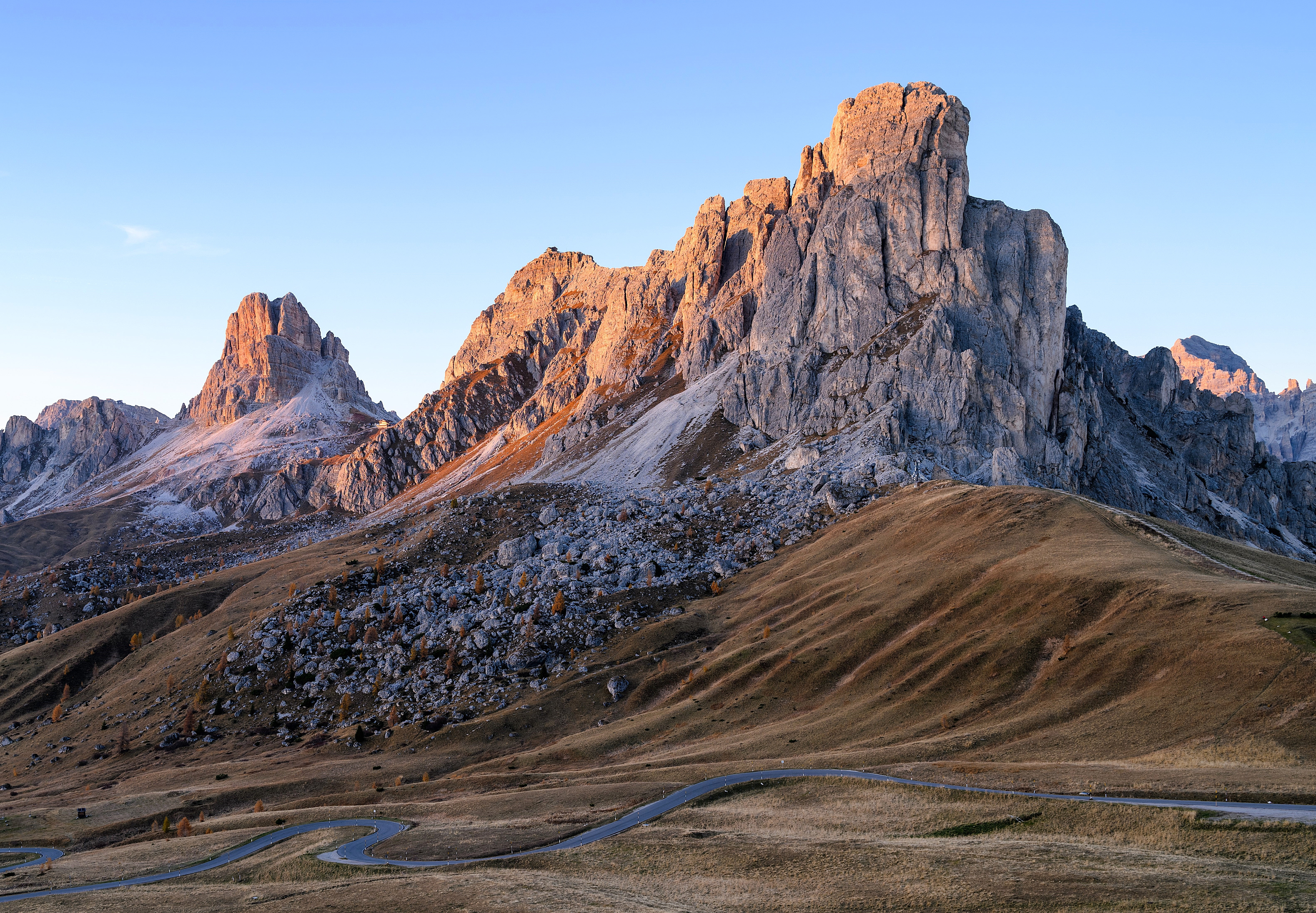
Averau (left) and Gusela (right)

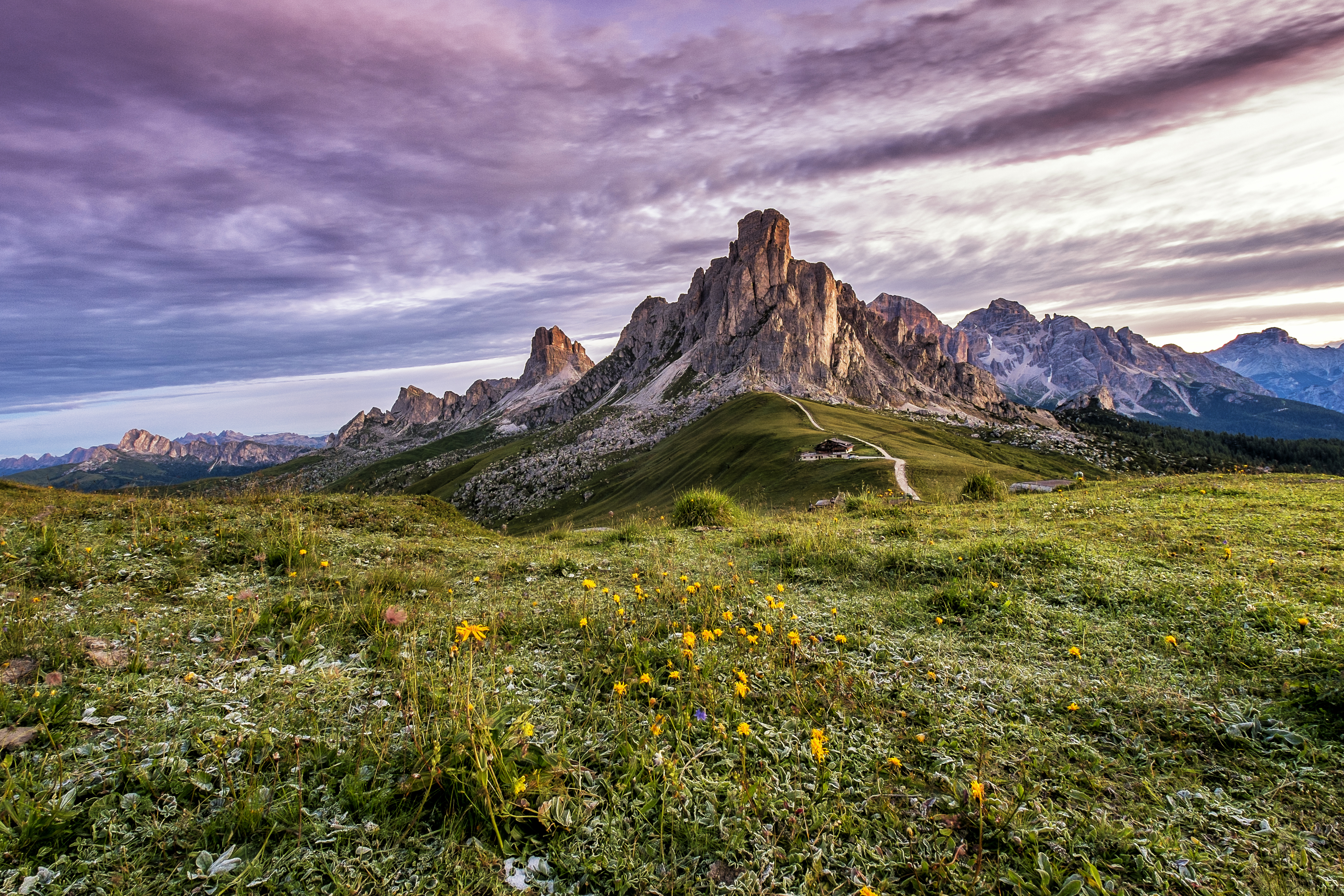

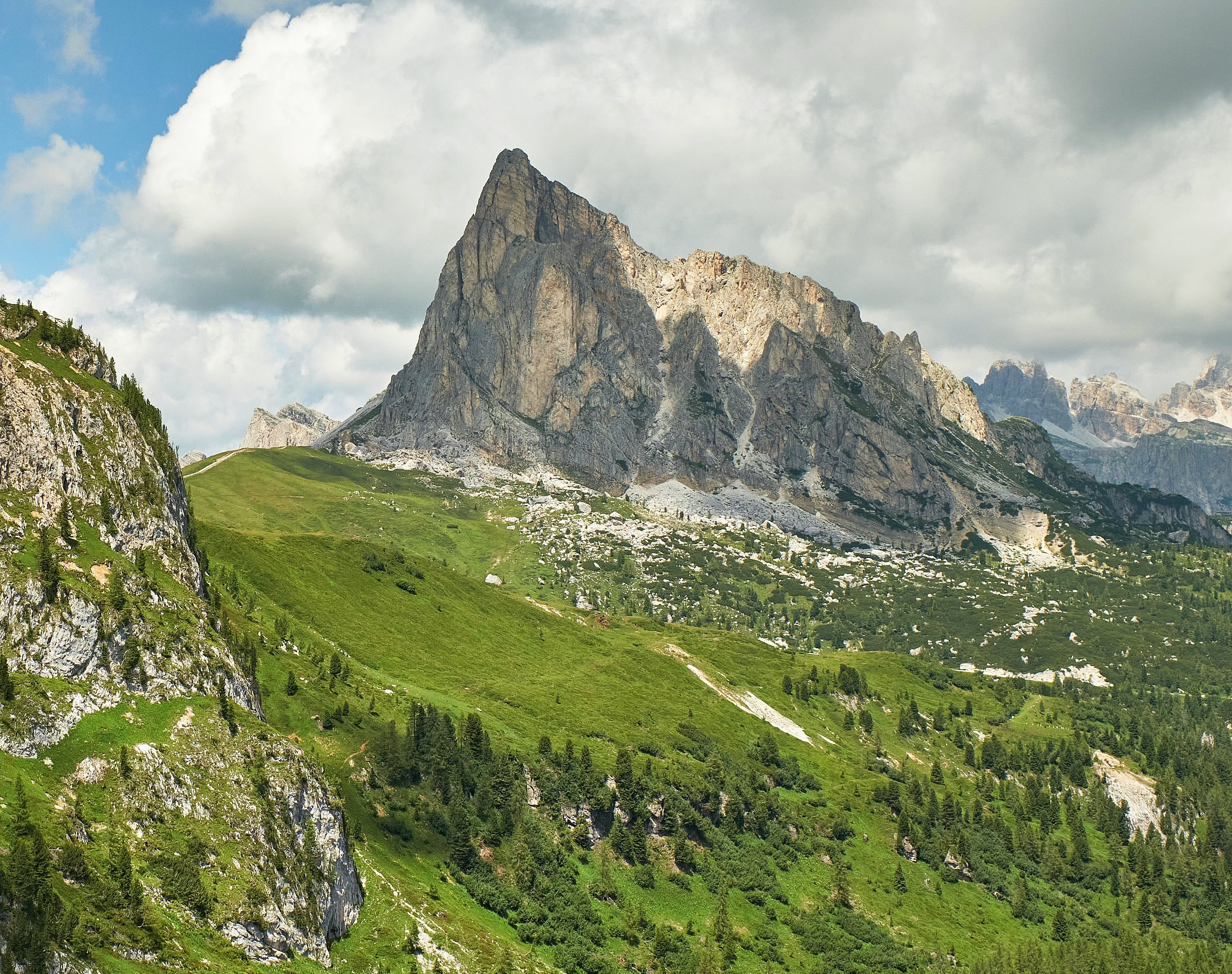
Southeast aspect

== See also ==
- Southern Limestone Alps
