= Five Towers =

Five Towers, or 5 Towers, may refer to:

- Cinque Torri (Five Towers), rock formation in Dolomites
- San Gimignano, Italian town known as Town of Five Towers
- 5 Towers (residential complex), skyscraper complex in Moscow
- 5 Towers, outdoor concert venue on Universal CityWalk Hollywood
