= Becco di Mezzodì =

Mountain in Italy

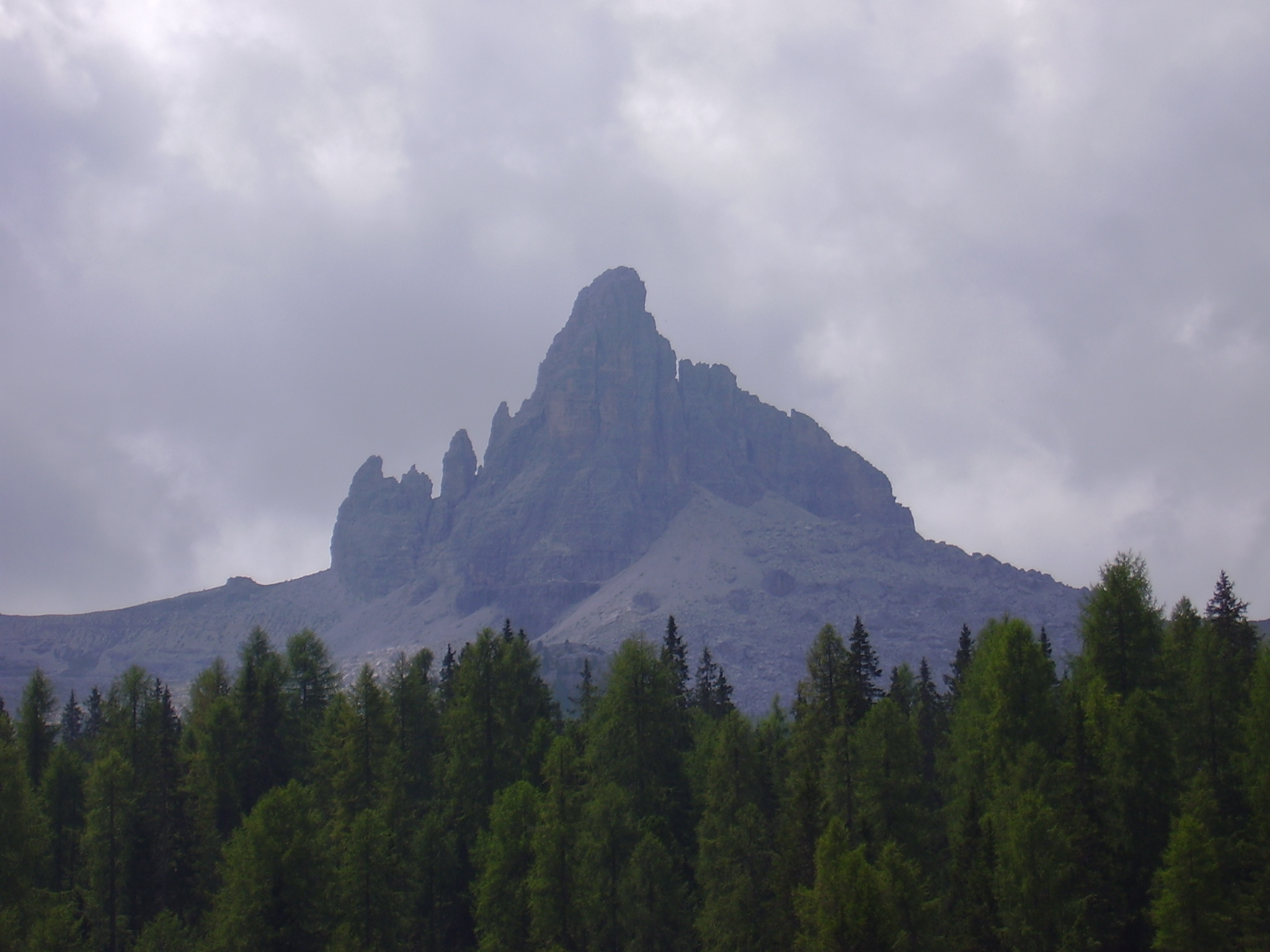
- Becco di Mezzodì

Highest point
- Elevation: 2,603 m (8,540 ft)
- Coordinates: 46°27′37″N 12°04′51″E

Geography
- Location within Alps
- Location: Veneto, Italy
- Parent range: Dolomites

Climbing
- First ascent: 1872

Becco di Mezzodì (2,603m) is a mountain of the Croda da Lago chain, a small mountain group in the central Dolomites. It is located above the resort of Cortina d'Ampezzo in Belluno, northern Italy. The mountain's name means Midday Peak in the local dialect, as the sun appears directly above the peak at midday from Cortina. The climb usually starts from the Refuge Croda da Lago on the road to the Giau Pass. Climbing gear and slings are required.
