= Croda da Lago =

Mountain in Italy

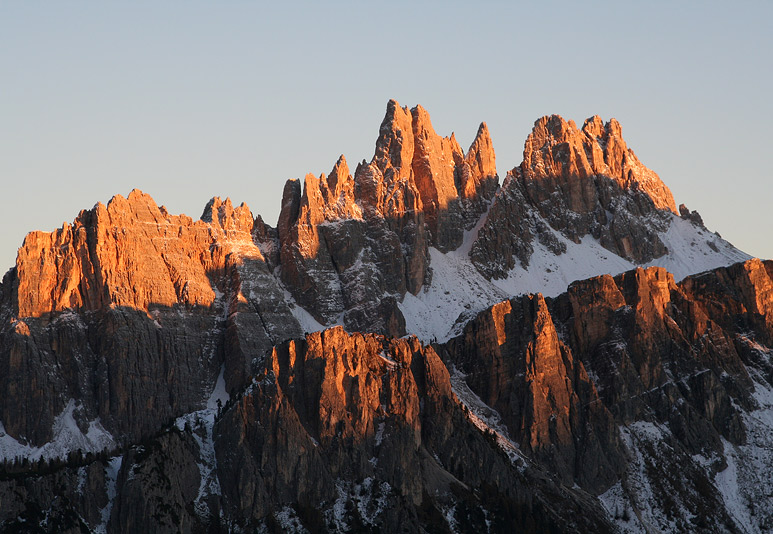

Highest point
- Peak: Cima d'Ambrizzola
- Elevation: 2,715 m (8,907 ft)
- Coordinates: 46°29′N 12°6′E

Geography
- Location within Alps
- Location: Veneto, Italy
- Parent range: Dolomites

Croda da Lago is a small mountain chain in the central Dolomites in Veneto, northern Italy, just east of the Giau Pass. The highest peak of the group, the Cima d'Ambrizzola has an elevation of 2,715 metres. The range is very popular with hikers and mountain cyclists.

== Main Summits ==
  1. Cima Ambrizzola, 2715 m
  2. Croda da Lago, 2701 m
  3. Monte Cernera, 2664 m
  4. Cima de Lastoi, 2657 m
  5. Becco di Mezzodì, 2603 m
