= Cima Ambrizzola =

Mountain in Italy

- Cima d'Ambrizzola
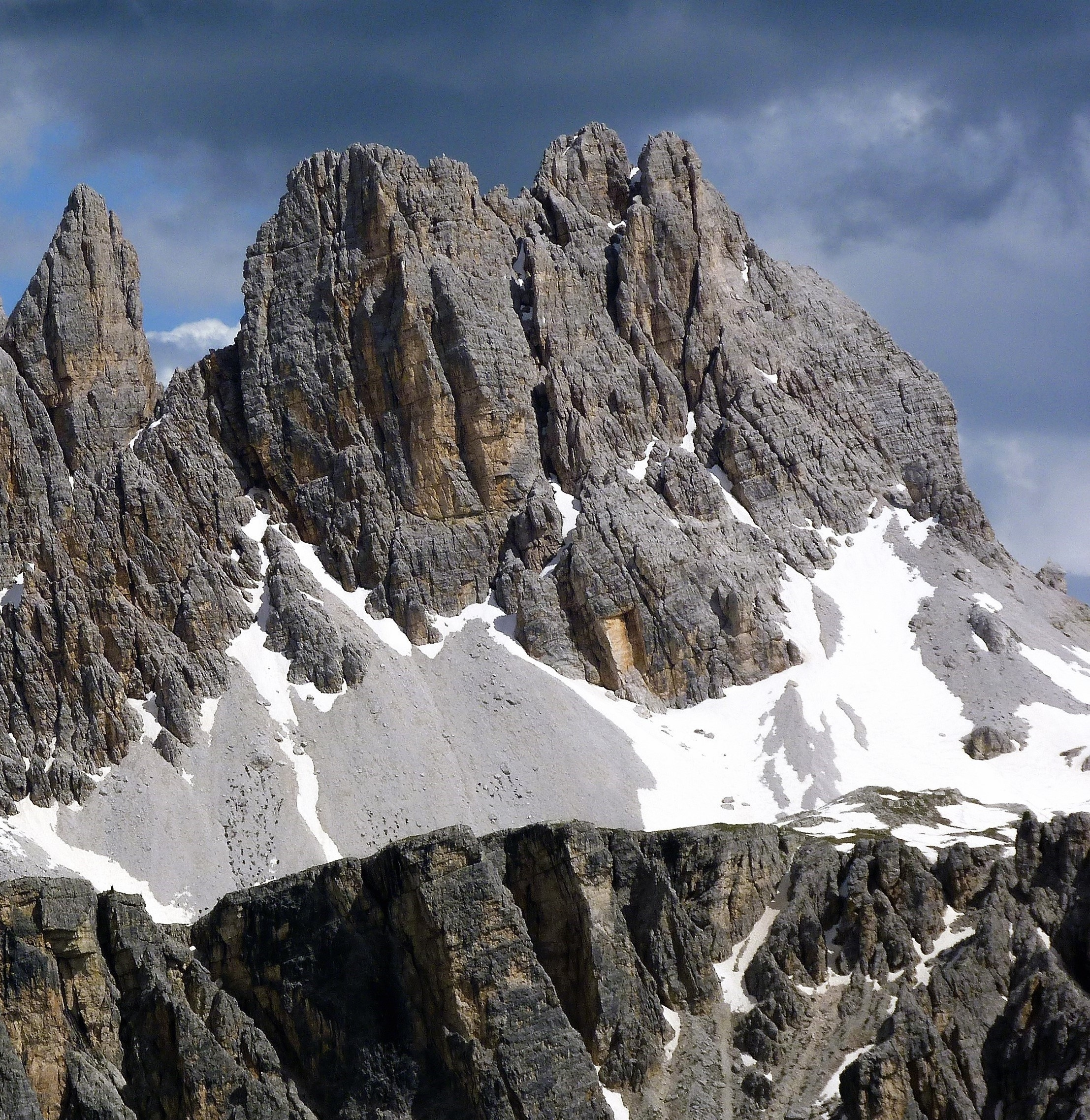
- West aspect

Highest point
- Elevation: 2,715 m (8,907 ft)
- Prominence: 610 m (2,001 ft)
- Parent peak: Tofana di Mezzo
- Isolation: 6.92 km (4.30 mi)
- Coordinates: 46°28′45″N 12°05′53″E

Geography
- Location within Italy
- Interactive map of Cima Ambrizzola
- Country: Italy
- Province: Belluno
- Parent range: Dolomites; Ampezzo Dolomites; Croda da Lago
- Topo map: Tabacco 03 Cortina d’Ampezzo e Dolomiti Ampezzane

Geology
- Rock age: Triassic
- Rock type: Dolomite

Climbing
- First ascent: 1878

Cima Ambrizzola is a mountain in the province of Belluno in Italy.

== Description ==
Cima Ambrizzola is a 2,715-meter-elevation (8,907-foot) summit situated east of Giau Pass in the Dolomites. It is the highest peak of the Croda da Lago group. Set in the Veneto region, the peak is located seven kilometers (4.35 miles) south-southwest of the town of Cortina d'Ampezzo. Precipitation runoff from the mountain drains chiefly to the Boite, except the south slope which drains into a tributary of the Piave. Topographic relief is significant as the summit rises 665 meters (2,181 feet) above Lago Fedèra in one kilometer (0.6 mile). The nearest higher neighbor is Cime di Forca Rossa, 6.92 kilometers (4.3 miles) to the southeast. The first ascent of the Ambrizzola summit was accomplished on August 23, 1878, by Angelo and Pietro Dimai, P. Fröschels, and Fr. Silberstein via the east side. The west side was first climbed on August 27, 1895, by Giuseppe Colli, Alberto De Falkner, Zaccaria Pompanin, and Leone Sinigaglia.

== Climate ==
Based on the Köppen climate classification, Cima Ambrizzola is located in an alpine climate zone with long, cold winters, and short, mild summers. Weather systems are forced upwards by the mountains (orographic lift), causing moisture to drop in the form of rain and snow. The months of June through September offer the most favorable weather for visiting or climbing in this area.

== Gallery ==
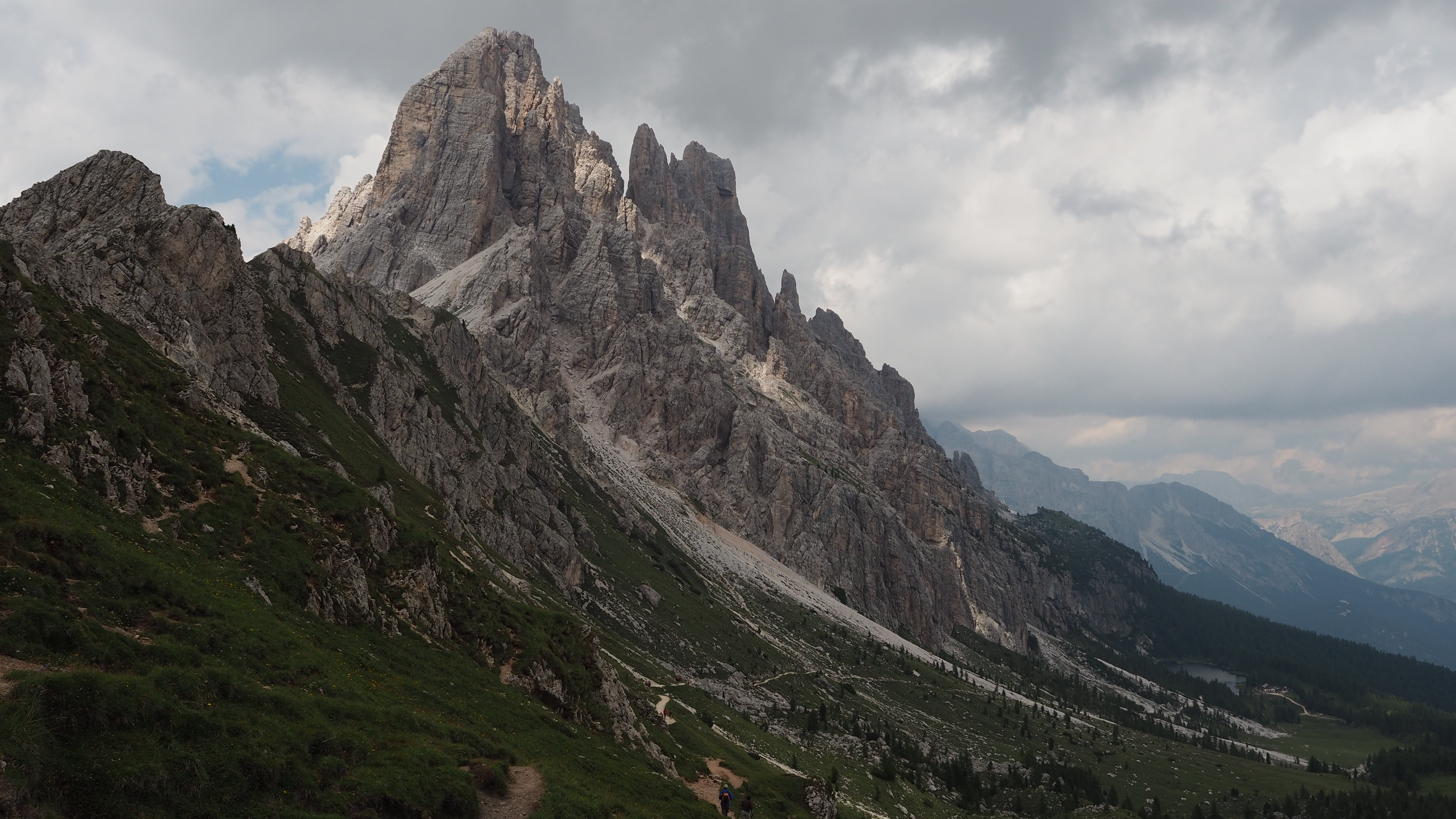
Southeast aspect

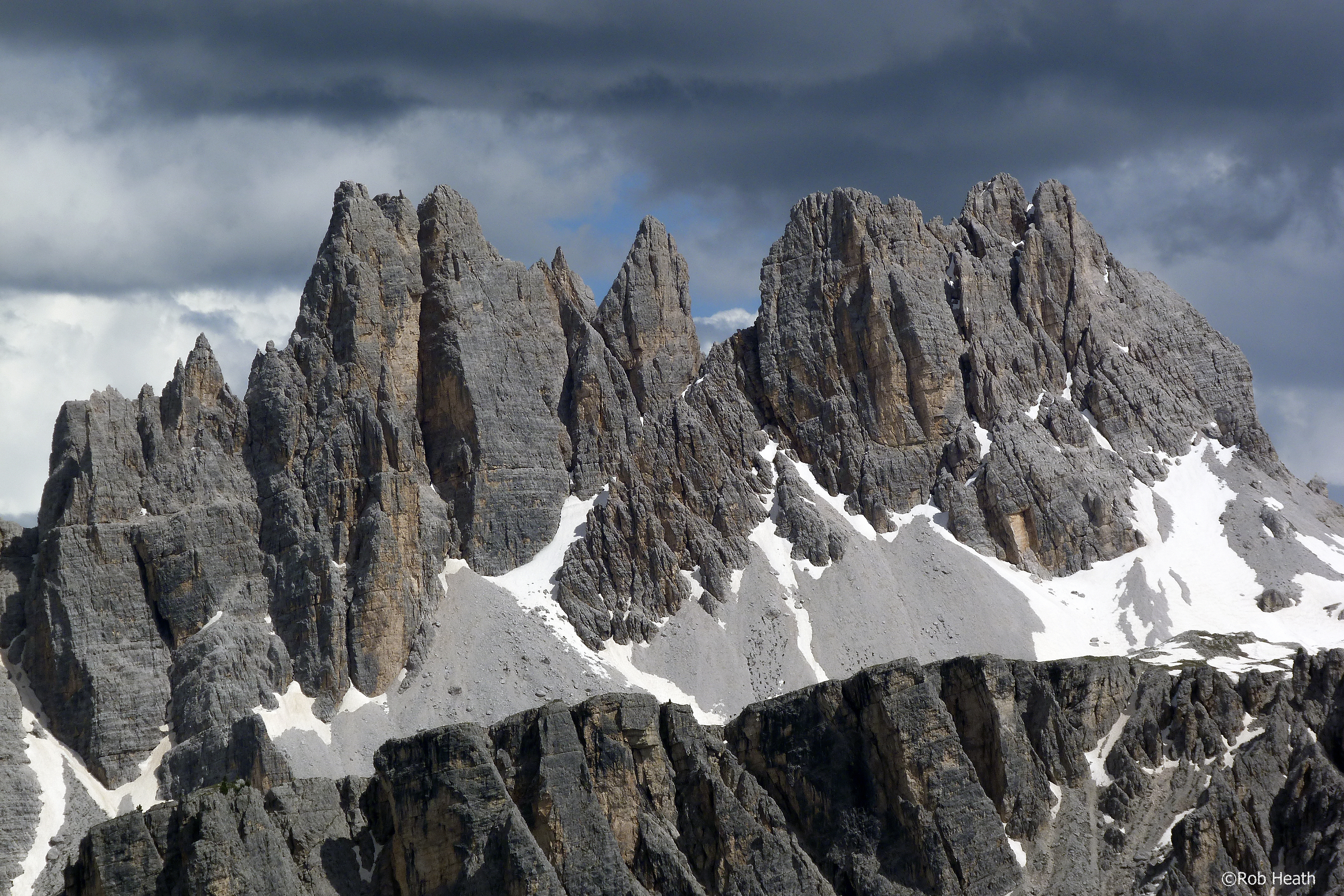
Croda da Lago, with Cima Ambrizzola furthest to right

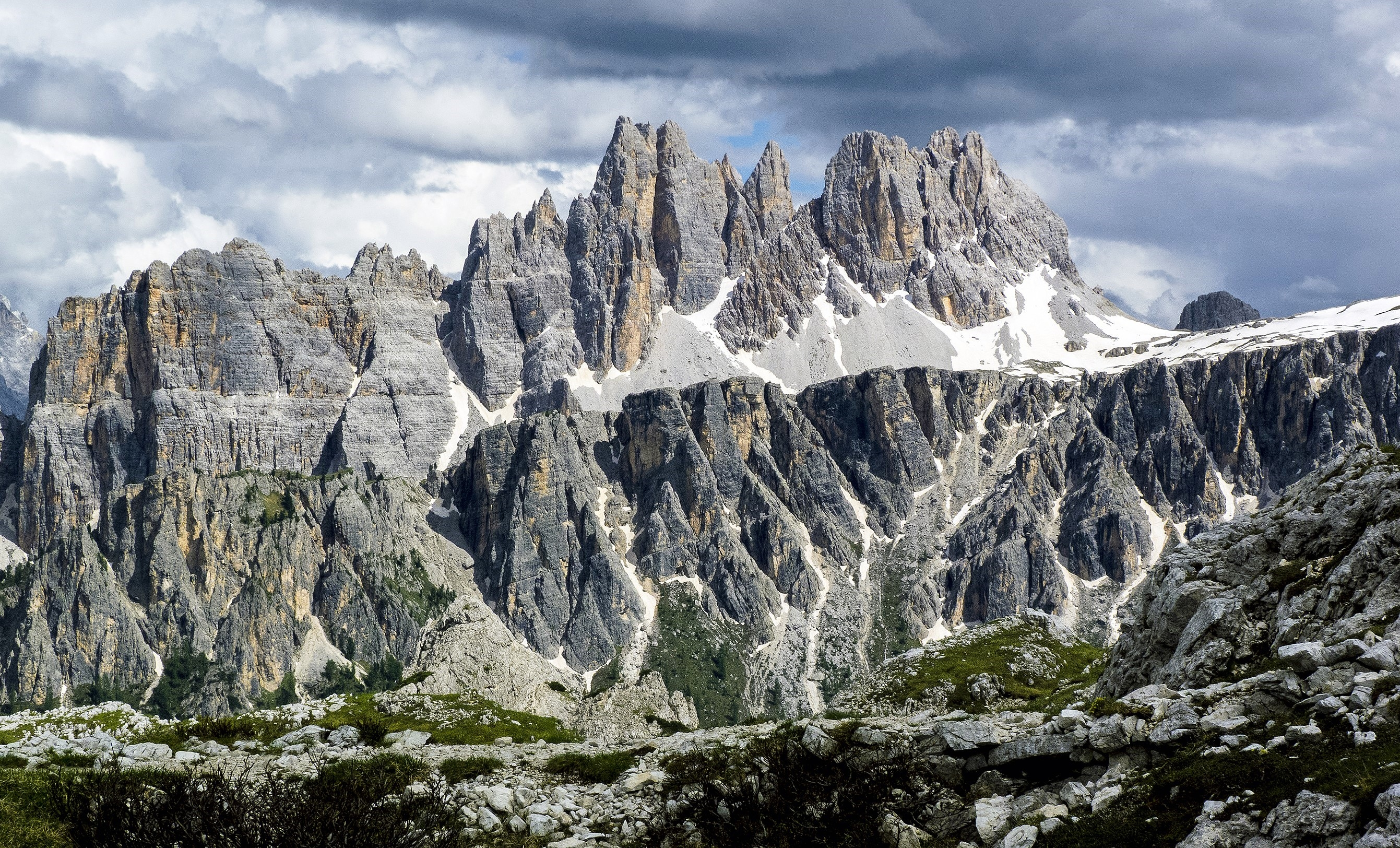
Croda da Lago, with Cima Ambrizzola furthest to right

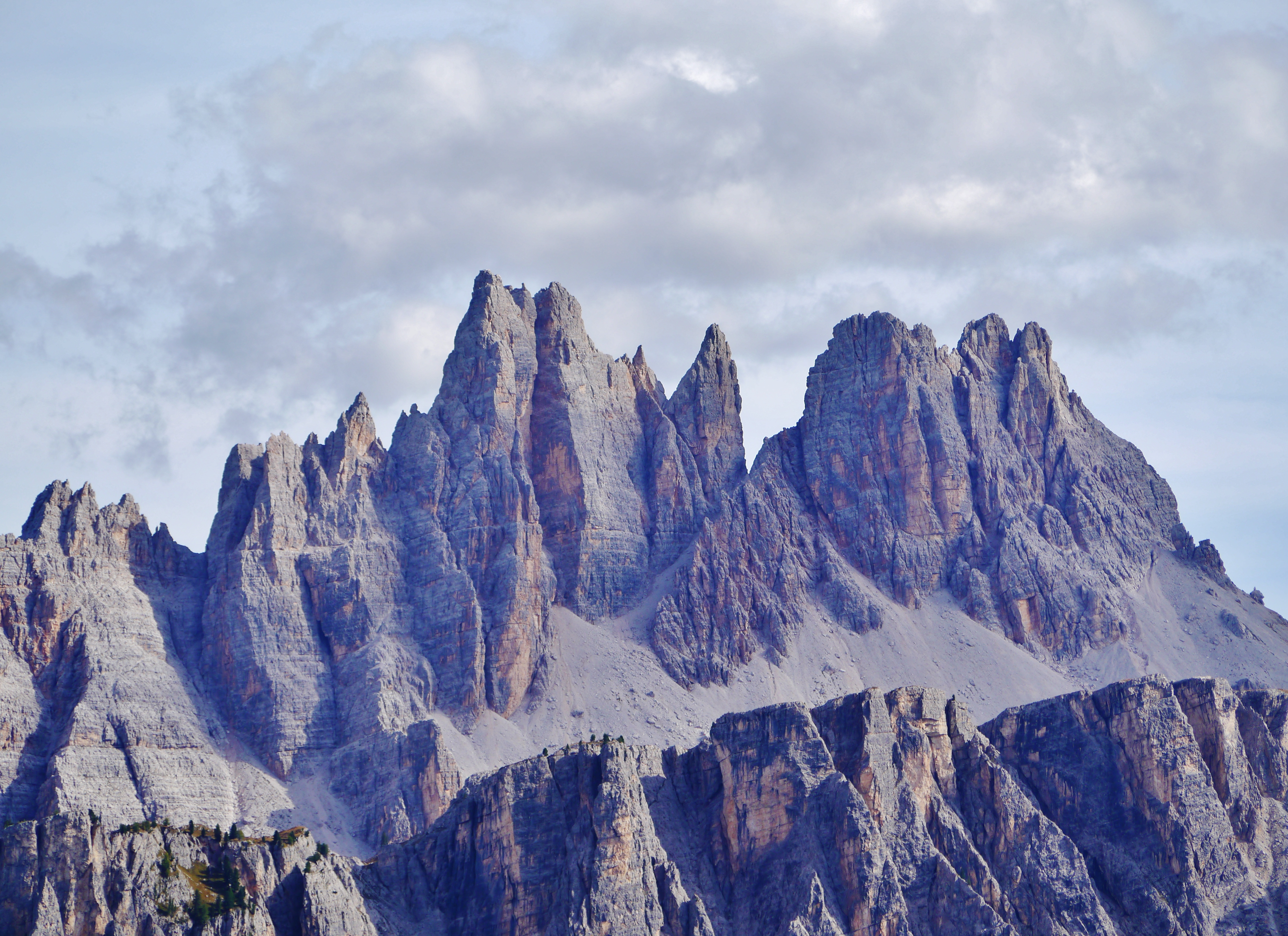
Cima Ambrizzola furthest to right

== See also ==
- Southern Limestone Alps
