= Setsas =

Mountain in Italy

- Settsass
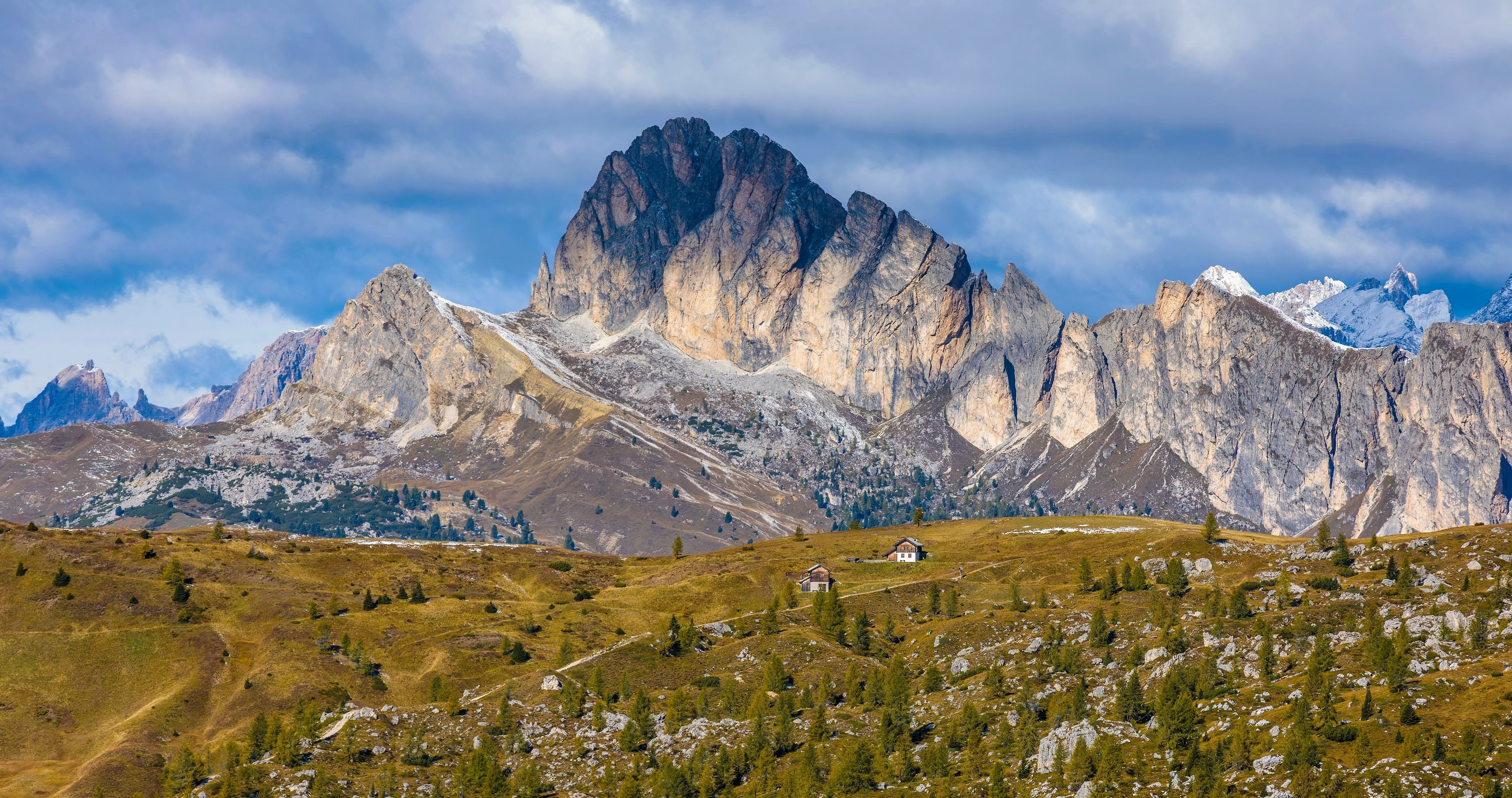
- Southeast aspect

Highest point
- Elevation: 2,571 m (8,435 ft)
- Prominence: 403 m (1,322 ft)
- Parent peak: Tofana di Mezzo
- Isolation: 3.54 km (2.20 mi)
- Coordinates: 46°31′10″N 11°57′26″E

Geography
- Location within Italy
- Country: Italy
- Province: Belluno
- Parent range: Dolomites; Fanes Group
- Topo map: Tabacco 07 Alta Badia - Arabba - Marmolada

Geology
- Rock age: Triassic
- Rock type: Dolomite

Climbing
- Easiest route: Hiking

Setsas is a mountain in the Province of Belluno in Italy.

== Description ==
Setsas, labeled as Settsass on the official IGM map, is a 2,571-meter-elevation (8,435-foot) summit in the Fanes Group of the Dolomites. Set in the Veneto region, the peak is located 13 kilometers (8.1 miles) west of the town of Cortina d'Ampezzo. Precipitation runoff from the mountain drains south into Torrente Cordevole which is a tributary of the Piave, whereas the north slope drains into tributaries of the Gran Ega. Topographic relief is significant as the summit rises 720 meters (2,362 feet) along the north slope in 1.6 kilometers (1 mile). The nearest higher neighbor is Spinarac, 3.54 kilometers (2.2 miles) to the east-northeast. The mountain's toponym translates from Ladin language as Seven Stones, wherein "sett" means seven, and "sass" means rock or stone. The mountain is notable as the location where Ferdinand von Richthofen first correctly postulated in 1860 that the Dolomites were composed of the remnants of ancient Triassic coral reefs.

== Climate ==
Based on the Köppen climate classification, Setsas is located in an alpine climate zone with long, cold winters, and short, mild summers. Weather systems are forced upwards by the mountains (orographic lift), causing moisture to drop in the form of rain and snow. The months of June through September offer the most favorable weather for visiting or climbing in this area.

== Gallery ==
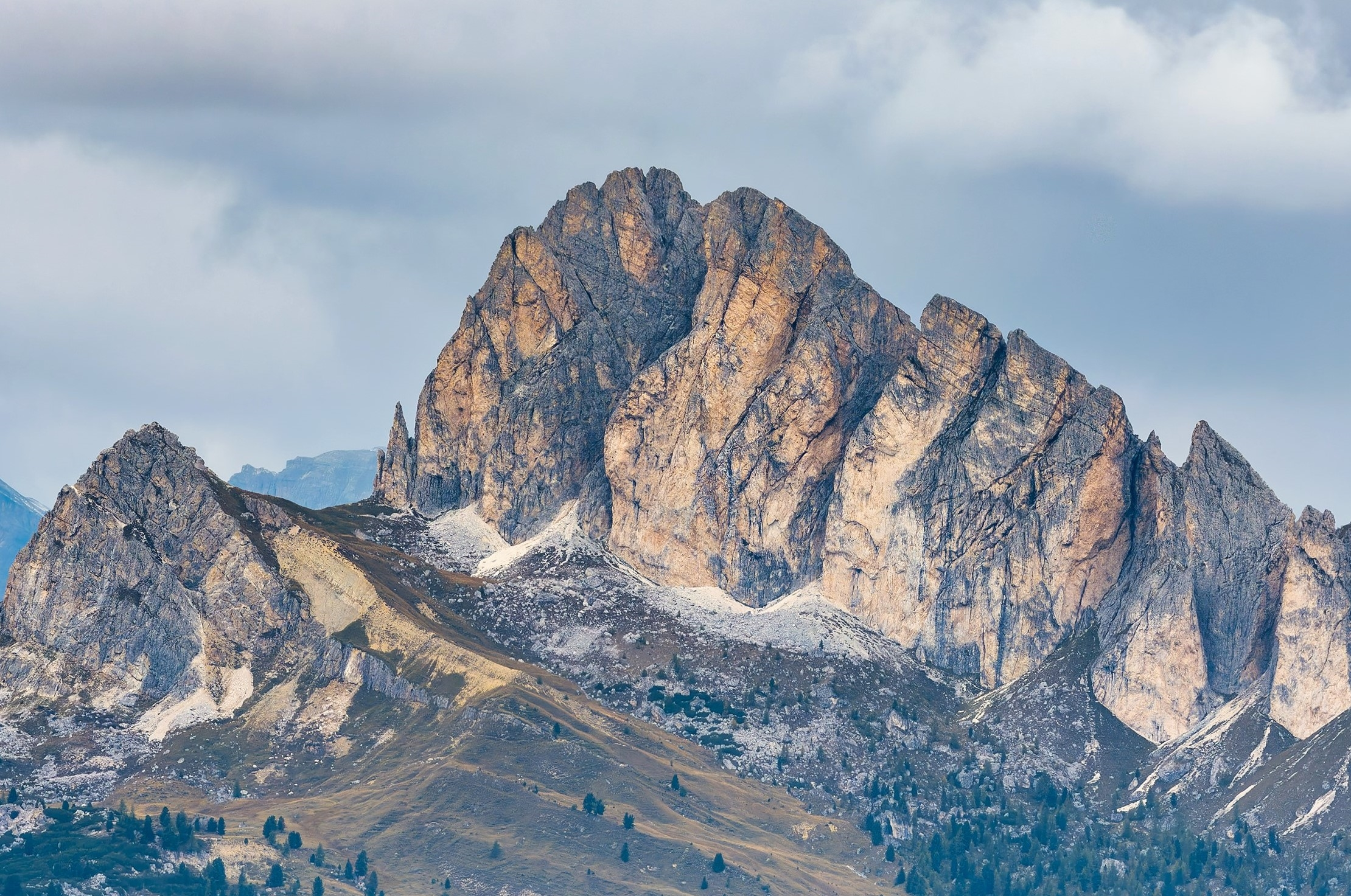
Southeast aspect.

== See also ==
- Southern Limestone Alps
