= Averau =

Mountain in Italy

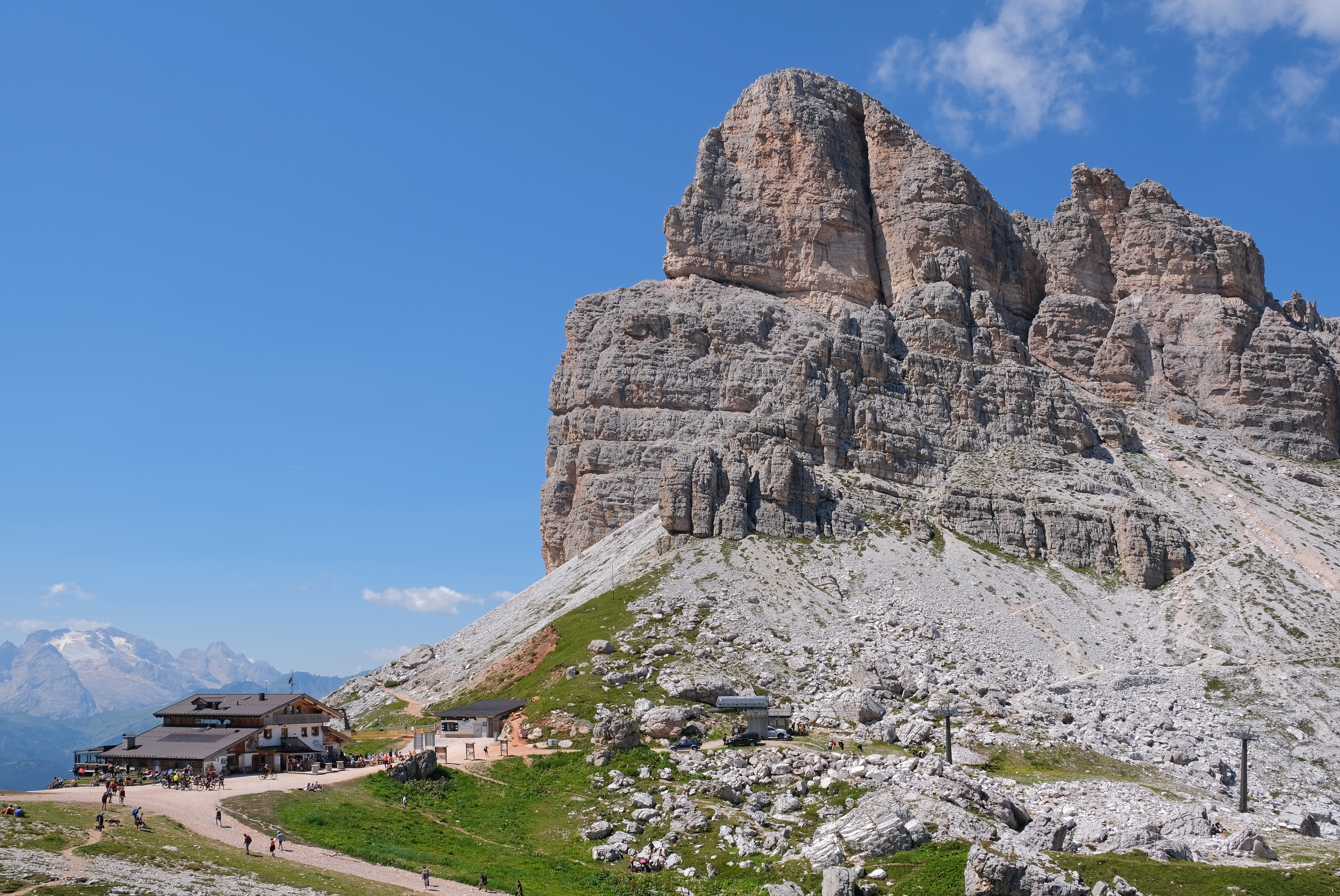
- Rifugio Averau and Averau

Highest point
- Elevation: 2,649 m (8,691 ft)
- Prominence: 413 m (1,355 ft)
- Isolation: 3.5 km (2.2 mi)
- Coordinates: 46°30′04″N 12°02′14″E

Geography
- Location within Alps
- Location: Veneto, Italy
- Parent range: Dolomites

Averau (2,649m) is the highest mountain of the Nuvolau Group in the Dolomites, in the Province of Belluno, northern Italy. It lies between the Falzarego Pass and the Giau Pass. The mountain is usually climbed from its northern face, which is less steep than its other faces, by the Averau via ferrata. The view from the summit takes in many of the Dolomitic giants, including Monte Civetta, Monte Pelmo, Antelao and Punta Sorapiss.
