= San Vito di Cadore =

- Comune
- Comune di San Vito di Cadore
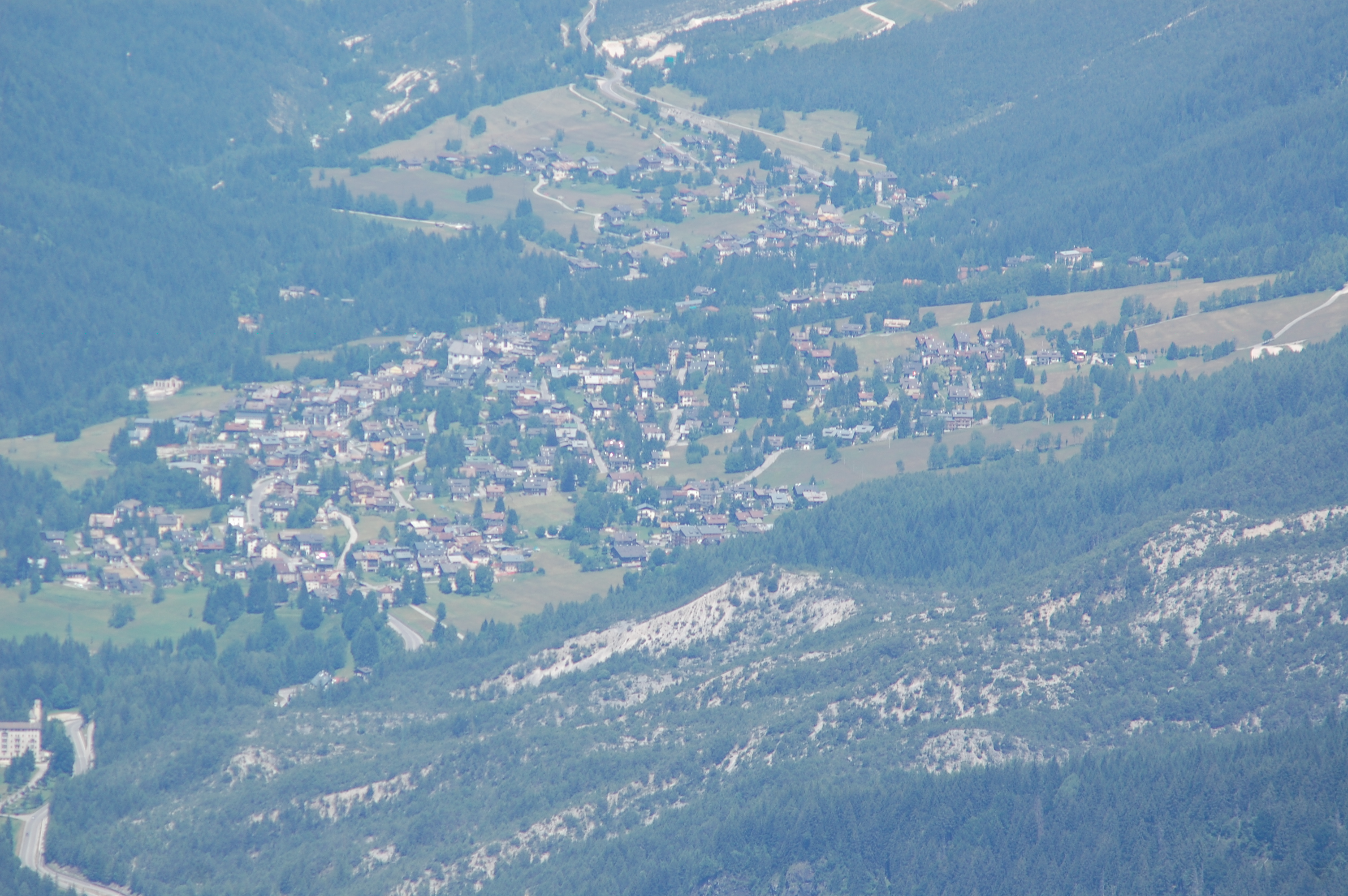

- Coat of arms

- Location within Italy Location within Veneto
- Coordinates: 46°27′N 12°13′E
- Country: Italy
- Region: Veneto
- Province: Belluno (BL)

Government
  - Mayor: Emanuele Caruzzo

Area
  - Total: 61 km^{2} (24 sq mi)
- Elevation: 1,011 m (3,317 ft)

Population (2018-01-01)
  - Total: 1,718
  - Density: 28/km^{2} (73/sq mi)
- Demonym: Sanvitesi
- Time zone: UTC+1 (CET)
  - Summer (DST): UTC+2 (CEST)
- Postal code: 32046
- Dialing code: 0436
- Patron saint: St. Vitus
- Saint day: June 15
- Website: Official website

San Vito di Cadore is a small town and comune in the province of Belluno in the Italian region of Veneto in the Dolomites. The distance to Cortina d'Ampezzo measures 9 kilometres (6 mi). The nearest mountain is Monte Antelao.

The town is a year-round tourist destination. It is the last town before Cortina d'Ampezzo on the SS51 Alemagna State Road that connects Belluno to Toblach.

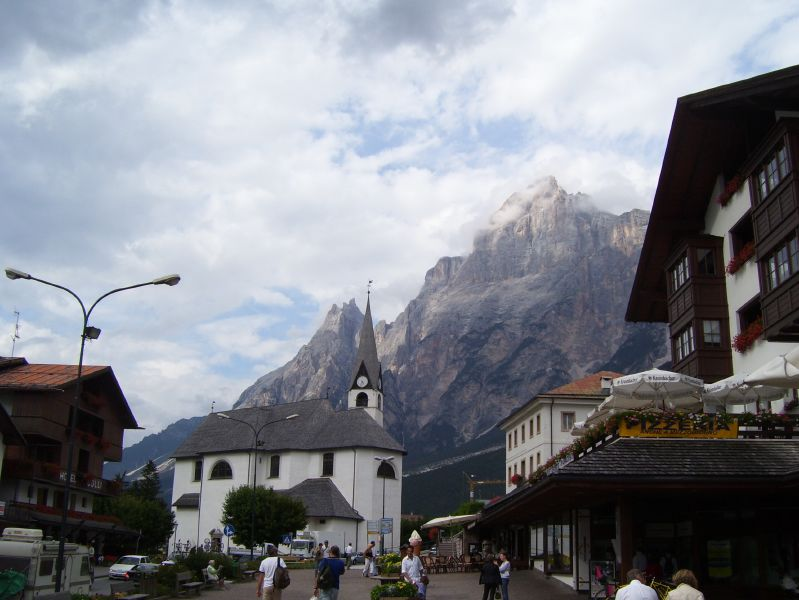
view of the town

== Twin towns / Sister cities ==
- Alfonsine, Italy
