= Giau Pass =

Mountain pass in the Dolomites, Italy

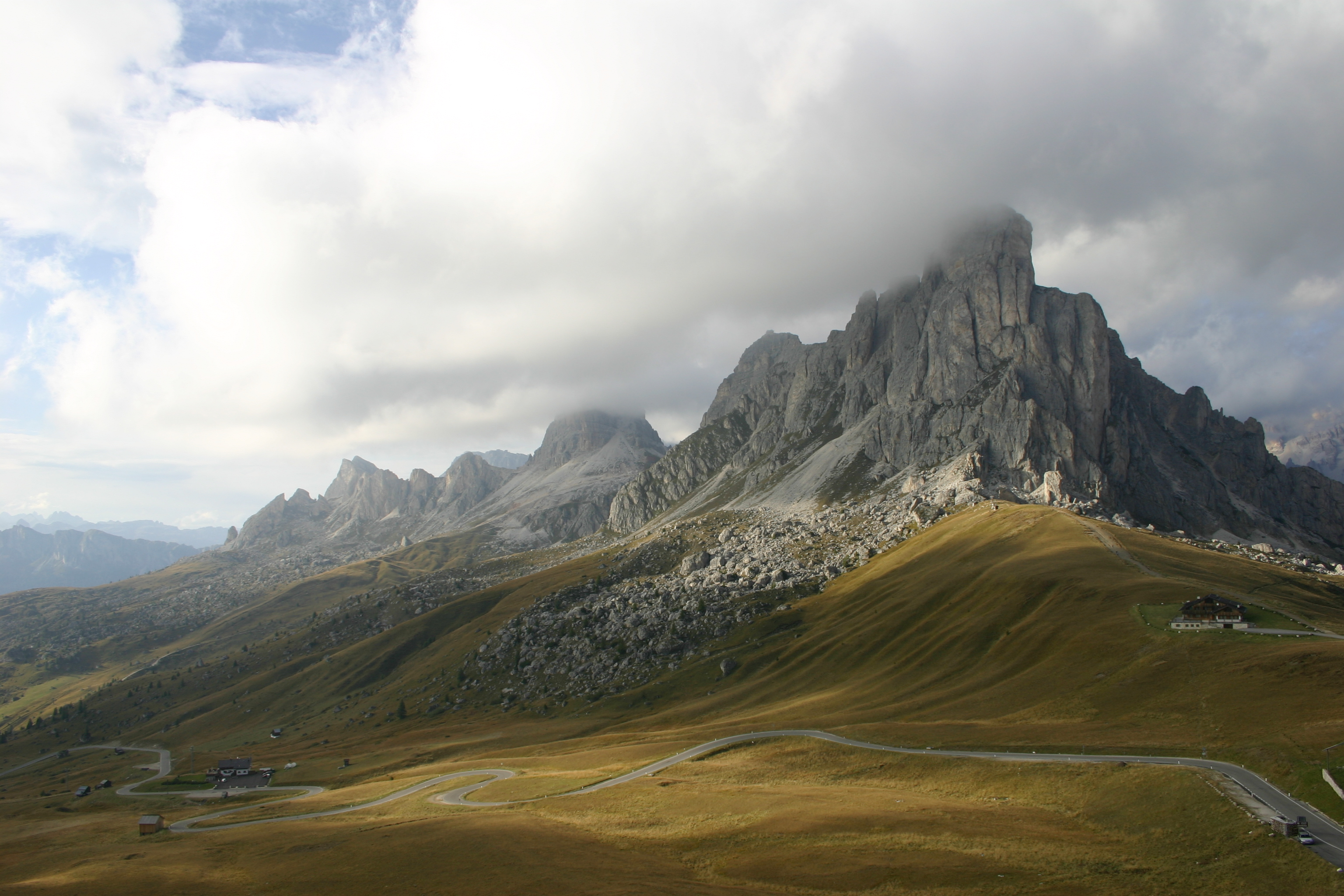
- Giau Pass with Ra Gusela

- Location within Alps
- Elevation: 2,236 m (7,336 ft)
- Traversed by: SP638

Location
- Location: Colle Santa Lucia, San Vito di Cadore (Italy)
- Range: Dolomites
- Coordinates: 46°28′57″N 12°3′14″E

The Giau Pass (Italian: Passo di Giau) (Ladin: Jof de Giau) (el. 2236 m.) is a high mountain pass in the Dolomites in the province of Belluno in Italy. It connects Cortina d'Ampezzo with Colle Santa Lucia and Selva di Cadore. It is located at the center of a vast mountain pasture at the foot of Nuvolau (2,574 m) and dell'Averau (2,647 m) from which you can reach the Monte Pore (2,405 m).

The view from the mountain is west towards Colle Santa Lucia with the Pale di San Martino, Cime D'Auta, Marmolada, Piz Boe and Setsas, north to Ra Gusela, and just to the east towards the valley of Cortina d'Ampezzo, with Tofane, Croda Rossa, Pomagagnon, Cristallo, and Croda da Lago. Archaeologists have discovered lithic scatter dating to the Mesolithic period in the Giau Pass and the surrounding area.

== Accessibility and territory ==
Passo Giau is comprised in the territories of Colle Santa Lucia, San Vito di Cadore, Cortina d'Ampezzo, and Selva di Cadore. The road that goes up from Selva di Cadore has 29 tornanti and 3 tunnels for protection against avalanches, while the side towards Cortina is more easily passable. It is an interesting alternative to get to Cortina from Agordino area also because the road of Passo Giau, unlike the Passo Falzarego road is passable by trucks and coaches. However, despite the efforts made over the years, the winter season is often compromised by the avalanches that come down to block the uncovered parts of the road.

== Mountain huts ==
- Rifugio Passo Giau (2236 m) - Colle Santa Lucia
- Rirugio Da Aurelio (2175 m) - Colle Santa Lucia
- Rifugio Fedare (2000 m) - Colle Santa Lucia
- Malga Giau (1900 m) - San Vito di Cadore

== Cycling ==
=== Maratona dles Dolomites bicycle race ===
Since 1988 the Giau Pass is the sixth and steepest of seven Dolomites mountain passes riders cross in the annual Maratona dles Dolomites single-day bicycle race.

=== Appearances in Giro d'Italia (since 1953) ===
Year	Stage	Category	Start	Finish	Leader at the summit	Winner of the stage
1973	19	Cima Coppi	Andalo	Auronzo di Cadore	José Manuel Fuente (ESP)	
1989	14		Misurina	Corvara in Badia	Henry Cárdenas (COL)	
1992	13		Bassano del Grappa	Corvara in Badia	Bruno Cornillet (FRA)	
2007	15		Trento	Tre Cime di Lavaredo	Leonardo Piepoli (ITA)	
2008	15		Arabba	Passo Fedaia	Emanuele Sella (ITA)	
2011	15	Cima Coppi	Conegliano	Gardeccia/Val di Fassa	Stefano Garzelli (ITA)	
2012	17		Falzes	Cortina d'Ampezzo	Domenico Pozzovivo (ITA)	
2016	14		Alpago (Farra)	Corvara	Darwin Atapuma (COL)	
2021	16	Cima Coppi	Sacile	Cortina d'Ampezzo	Egan Bernal (COL)	
2023	19		Longarone	Tre Cime di Lavaredo	Derek Gee (CAN)	
2026	19	Cima Coppi	Feltre	Alleghe	Giulio Ciccone (ITA)	

== See also ==
- List of highest paved roads in Europe
- List of mountain passes
