= List of museums in Veneto =

This is a list of museums in Veneto, Italy.

Name	Image	Description	Address	City	Coordinates
Albino Luciani Diocesan Museum		Christian art museum	Via Largo del Seminario, 2	Vittorio Veneto	45.97644°N 12.29311°E
Altinum		Ancient Venetic site and national archaeology museum		Quarto d'Altino	45.54639°N 12.39889°E
Bassano Civic Museum		Town art and architecture museum housed in a former Franciscan convent		Bassano del Grappa	45.76642°N 11.7352°E
Biblioteca Marciana		Public library	St Mark's Square	Venice	
Burano Lace Museum		Museum on the art and history of Italian lace, managed by the Fondazione Musei Civici di Venezia	Piazza Galuppi, 187	Burano	45.48434°N 12.41923°E
Ca' d'Oro		Venetian Gothic palace that houses the Galleria Giorgio Franchetti alla Ca' d'Oro, an art museum	Cannaregio 3932 (Calle Ca' d'Oro)	Cannaregio	45.44056°N 12.33389°E
Ca' Loredan Vendramin Calergi		15th-century palace that houses the Venice Casino and Wagner Museum		Venice	
Ca' Pesaro		17th-century Baroque palace and museum	Santa Croce 2076, 30135	Venice	45.44098°N 12.33171°E
Ca' Rezzonico		Art museum housed in an 18th-century Venetian and Baroque style palace	Dorsoduro 3136, 30123	Dorsoduro	45.43342°N 12.32682°E
Carlo Goldoni's House		Writer's house museum for playwright Carlo Goldoni	San Polo 2794, 30125	San Polo	
CastelBrando		Medieval castle and museum		Cison di Valmarino	
Castelvecchio Museum		Museum housed in Castelvecchio	Corso Castelvecchio, 2	Verona	45.44°N 10.98778°E
Diocesan Museum		Religious art and artifact museum	Palazzo Vescovile, 12	Piazza Duomo, Padua	45.40690°N 11.87227°E
Doge's Palace		Former residence of the Doge of Venice	Piazza San Marco 1, 30124	Venice	
Forte Tre Sassi		World War I fortress		Cortina d'Ampezzo	
Gallerie dell'Accademia		Pre-19th-century art museum	Campo della Carità – Sestiere Dorsoduro 1050	Venice	45.43113°N 12.32816°E
Jewish Museum of Venice		Museum on the history of Jews in Venice	Campo di Ghetto Nuovo, 2902, b, 30121	Venice	
Le stanze del vetro		Rotating exhibits of Venetian glass		Venice	
Loggia and Odeo Cornaro		16th-century Renaissance buildings built for Alvise Cornaro	Via Cesarotti 37	Padua	
Mario Rimoldi Modern Art Museum		Contemporary and modern art museum	Corso Italia, 69	Cortina d'Ampezzo	46.53704°N 12.1375°E
Murano Glass Museum		Museum on the history of glass	Fondamenta Giustinian 8, 30121	Murano	45.4566°N 12.35686°E
Museo Archeologico Nazionale, Venice		Archaeology museum	Piazza San Marco 52, 30124	Piazza San Marco, Venice	12.3393°N 45.4336°E
Museo Canova		Art museum dedicated to sculptor Antonio Canova	Via Antonio Canova 74	Possagno	
Museo Correr		Art museum, managed by the Fondazione Musei Civici di Venezia	San Marco, 52	San Marco	45.43360°N 12.33716°E
Museo di Storia Naturale di Venezia		Natural history museum, located in the Fondaco dei Turchi, managed by the Fondazione Musei Civici di Venezia	Santa Croce, 1730	Venice	45.4418°N 12.3286°E
Museo Fortuny		Art museum located in the Palazzo Pesaro Orfei	San Marco 3958	Venice	45.43556°N 12.3323°E
Museo Nazionale Atestino		Archaeology museum located in the Palazzo Mocenigo	Via Guido Negri, 9/c	Este	45.22917°N 11.65663°E
Museo provinciale di Torcello		Archaeology and art museum	Piazza Torcello	Torcello	45.4985°N 12.4187°E
Museo Rossimoda della calzatura		Shoe museum, located in the Villa Foscarini Rossi	Villa Foscarini Rossi, via Doge Pisani 1/2	Stra	45.40903°N 12.00692°E
Museo Storico Navale		Naval history museum		Castello, Venice	45.43256°N 12.35005°E
Musei Civici di Padova		Complex of museums dedicated to a former Augustinian order	Piazza Eremitani 8	Padua	
Museum of Byzantine Icons		Museum of Byzantine icons and manuscripts, operated by the Hellenic Institute of Byzantine and Post-Byzantine Studies in Venice		Venice	
Museum of Precinema		Museum dedicated to precinema	Prato della Valle 1/A	Padova	
Palazzo Chiericati		Renaissance palace designed by Andrea Palladio		Vicenza	
Palazzo Crepadona		Medieval palace and library		Belluno	
Palazzo Grassi		Palace and art museum	Campo San Samuele, 3231	Venice	45.43361°N 12.32778°E
Palazzo Grimani di Santa Maria Formosa		Palace	Castello Ramo Grimani, 4858	Venice	45.43695°N 12.34225°E
Palazzo Leoni Montanari, Vicenza		Late Baroque palace and art museum	Contrà Santa Corona, 25	Vicenza	45.5501°N 11.547°E
Palazzo Loredan Cini		Gothic-style palace and art museum	Campo San Vio 864, Dorsoduro	Venice	
Palazzo Miniscalchi		Late-Gothic style palace and museum	Via San Mammaso, 2/A	Verona	45.44520°N 10.99597°E
Palazzo Roverella		Renaissance-style palace and art museum	Via Laurenti 8/10	Rovigo	
Peggy Guggenheim Collection		Modern art museum	Calle S.Cristoforo, 701, Dorsoduro	Venice	45.43083°N 12.33154°E
Pinacoteca Querini Stampalia		Art collection and museum, managed by the Fondazione Querini Stampalia		Venice	45.43642°N 12.34107°E
Poli Grappa Museum		15th-century palace and museum on the production of grappa		Bassano del Grappa	
Punta della Dogana		Art museum		Venice	45.4308°N 12.33618°E
Regole of Ampezzo Ethnographic Museum		Ethnographic museum		Cortina d'Ampezzo	
Rinaldo Zardini Paleontology Museum		Palaeontological museum		Cortina d'Ampezzo	
San Maurizio		Former church, location of the Museo della Musica		Venice	
Scuola del Santo		Former headquarters of the Confraternity of Saint Anthony of Padua, located within the Basilica of Saint Anthony of Padua complex		Padua	45.40105°N 11.88017°E
St Mark's Clocktower		Renaissance clock tower, managed by the Fondazione Querini Stampalia	St Mark's Square	Venice	
Treasury of St Mark's Basilica		St Mark's Basilica's collection of sacred objects and reliquaries		Venice	
Villa Badoer		Villa designed by Andrea Palladio		Fratta Polesine	
Villa Barbaro		Villa designed by Andrea Palladio		Maser	
Villa Contarini		Baroque-style palace		Piazzola sul Brenta	
Villa Emo		Villa designed by Andrea Palladio	Vedelago	Piazzola sul Brenta	
Villa Foscari		16th-century villa		Mira	
Villa Godi		16th-century villa		Lugo di Vicenza	
Villa La Rotonda		Renaissance villa designed by Andrea Palladio		Vicenza	
Villa Pisani		Late-Baroque palace	Via Doge Pisani 7 – 30039	Stra	
Villa Saraceno		16th-century villa		Agugliaro	
