= Castello Roganzuolo Altarpiece =

Painting by Titian

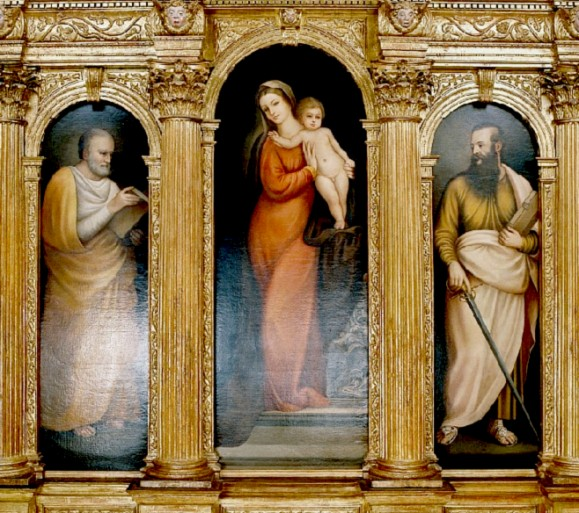
Castello Roganzuolo Altarpiece

The Castello Roganzuolo Altarpiece, Castello Roganzuolo Polyptych or Madonna and Child with Saint Peter and Saint Paul is a painting by Titian, commissioned in 1543 by the leading citizens of Castello Roganzuolo, Province of Treviso, Veneto, Italy. It is now in the Albino Luciani Diocesan Museum in Vittorio Veneto.

The painting is a triptych with three narrow round-topped sections holding the standing figures, which was by then a rather old-fashioned format.

== History ==
All records of payment to the artist (including building a villa for the artist on Col di Manza) survive in the parish accounts. It was completed and installed on the high altar of the church of St Peter and St Paul in the town in 1549, under a set of 1530s frescoes by the local painter Francesco da Milano.

During the First World War the area was invaded by the Austrian Empire and monsignor Giovanni Pizzinato, the town's parish priest, hid the work from them in the church's attic - he was interrogated and arrested but did not reveal its hiding place. The humidity in the attic damaged it colours and it was rediscovered after the war in poor condition. Badly restored, it was moved to the Diocesan Museum. Much of the work is irretrievably damaged and its fourth cymatium panel showing the dead Christ with angels is still lost. A copy of all four panels now stands in the church, in the original elaborate frame.

== See also ==
- List of works by Titian

== Bibliography ==
- Image of the copy of the painting
- Baldissin, M.; Soligon, A. (2002). Chiese a San Fior. Alla scoperta del patrimonio artistico. San Fior. pp. 98–100.
- Sartori, B. (1998). Sacerdoti a Castello Roganzuolo dal 1534 al 1998. Vittorio Veneto: Tipse.
- Svalduz, E. (2007). "Tiziano, la casa in Col di Manza e la Pala di Castello Roganzuolo". Studi Tizianeschi. Annuario della Fondazione Centro studi Tiziano e Cadore. Vol. V. pp. 97–111.
- Tagliaferro, G. (2007). "Tiziano Vecellio e bottega. Madonna con Bambino [...]". Lungo le vie di Tiziano. I luoghi e le opere di Tiziano, Francesco, Orazio e Marco Vecellio tra Vittorio Veneto e il Cadore. Skira. pp. 49–51.
- Tagliaferro G., La pala di Serravalle e la congiuntura degli anni '40 (publication on the Ca' Foscari site).
