= Foscarini =

Foscarini is a surname. Notable people with the name include:

- Antonio Foscarini (1570–1622), Venetian diplomat
- Claudio Foscarini (born 1958), Italian football coach
- Giacomo Foscarini (1523–1603), Venetian statesman
- Giovanni Paolo Foscarini (fl. 1600–1647), Italian guitarist, lutenist, theorist and composer
- Marco Foscarini (1696–1763), Venetian poet, writer and statesman
- Michele Foscarini (1632–1692), Venetian historian
- Paolo Antonio Foscarini (1575–1616), Carmelite priest and scientist

== See also ==
- 8076 Foscarini, an asteroid
- Foscari (disambiguation)
- Villa Foscarini Rossi a Stra
