= Foscari (disambiguation) =

The Foscari were an ancient Venetian patrician family.

Foscari may also refer to:

== People ==
- Alvise Foscari (1724–1783), Venetian admiral and administrator
- Francesco Foscari (1373–1457), the 65th Doge of the Republic of Venice
- Girolamo Foscari (1505–1563), Roman Catholic Bishop of Torcello
- Guarino Foscari, Saint (c. 1080- 1158), Italian Roman Catholic Augustinian canon regular and also Cardinal-Bishop of Palestrina
- Paolo Foscari (died 1393/4), Venetian noble, Bishop of Castello, and later Latin Archbishop of Patras
- Pietro Foscari (died 1485), Italian Roman Catholic cardinal

== Buildings ==
- Palazzo Foscari (disambiguation)
- Villa Foscari, a patrician villa in Mira, near Venice
- Villa Widmann – Foscari, an 18th-century villa located in Mira, owned by the families of Sceriman, Donà, Foscari

== See also ==
- I due Foscari, an opera by Giuseppe Verdi
- Foscarini (disambiguation)
