= Serravalle Altarpiece =

Painting by Titian

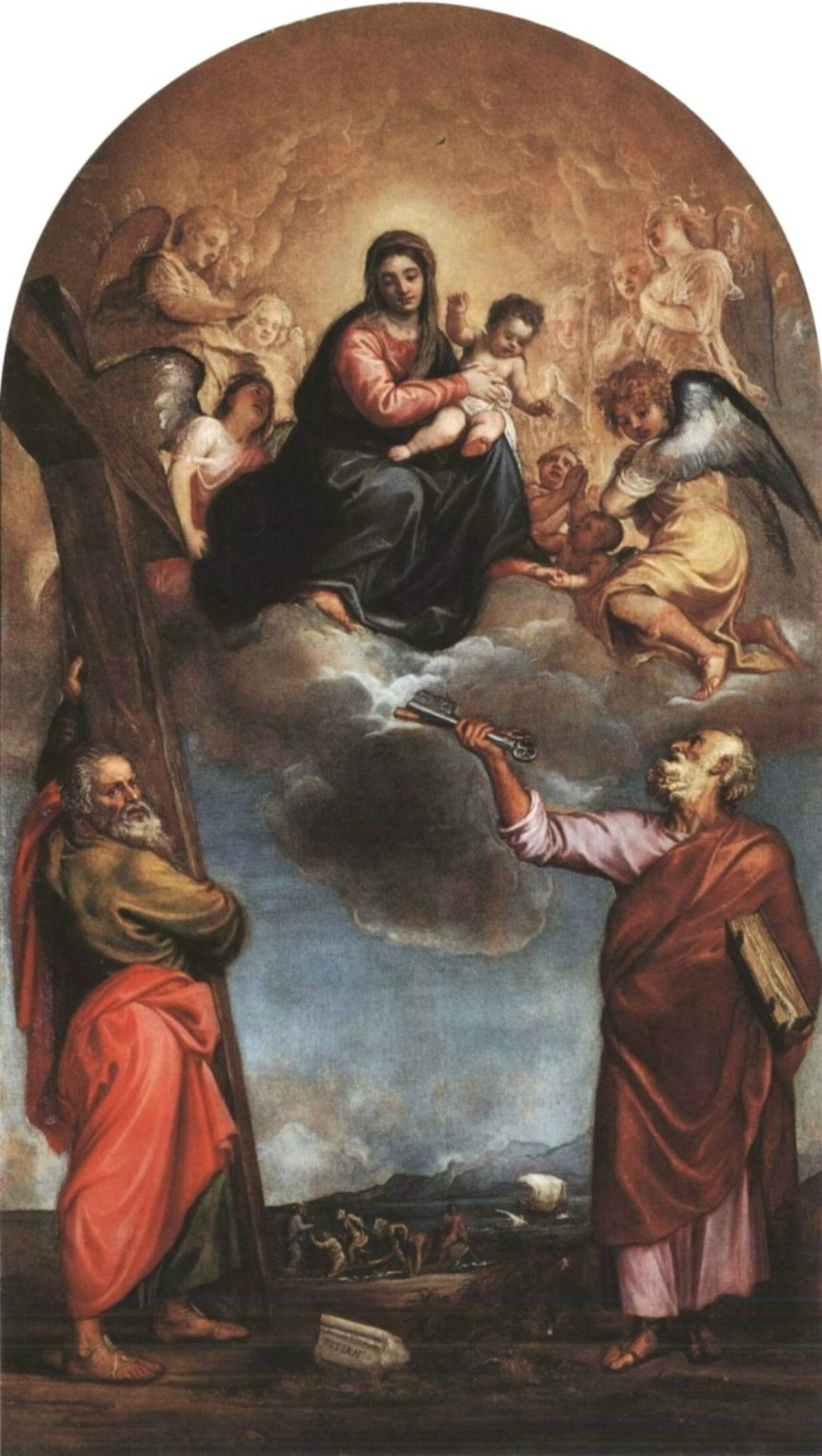
The Serravalle Altarpiece

The Serravalle Altarpiece or Madonna and Child in Glory with Saint Andrew and Saint Peter is an oil on wood painting by Titian, from c. 1542–1553. It is, in the church of Santa Maria Nova in Serravalle, for which it was commissioned.

== History ==
The town council of Serravalle commissioned the painting for the church in spring 1542, initially choosing the local painter Francesco da Milano but later voting to replace him with Titian, who was also commissioned to paint the Castello Roganzuolo Altarpiece that year. The contract with Titian was drawn up in autumn 1512 and total payment eventually amounted to 250 ducats. Probably completed between 1547 and 1548, the work was only delivered in the 1550s thanks to problems over the final payment to the artist - legal disputes over payment continued even after the work's delivery.

The work's condition was already deteriorating in the 17th century and this was worsened by several failed restorations, such as that of 1865. Its original colours were restored by two successful conservation efforts between 1991 and 2000.

== See also ==
- List of works by Titian

== Bibliography ==
- Giorgio Tagliaferro, Tiziano Vecellio. Madonna col Bambino in gloria e santi Andrea e Pietro, in Lungo le vie di Tiziano. I luoghi e le opere di Tiziano, Francesco, Orazio e Marco Vecellio tra Vittorio Veneto e il Cadore, a. c. di M. Mazza, Skira, 2007, pp. 54–65.
- Giorgio Tagliaferro, La pala di Serravalle e la congiuntura degli anni '40
