= Col di Manza =

Hill in Treviso, Italy

Coordinates: 45.9282°N 12.3287°E

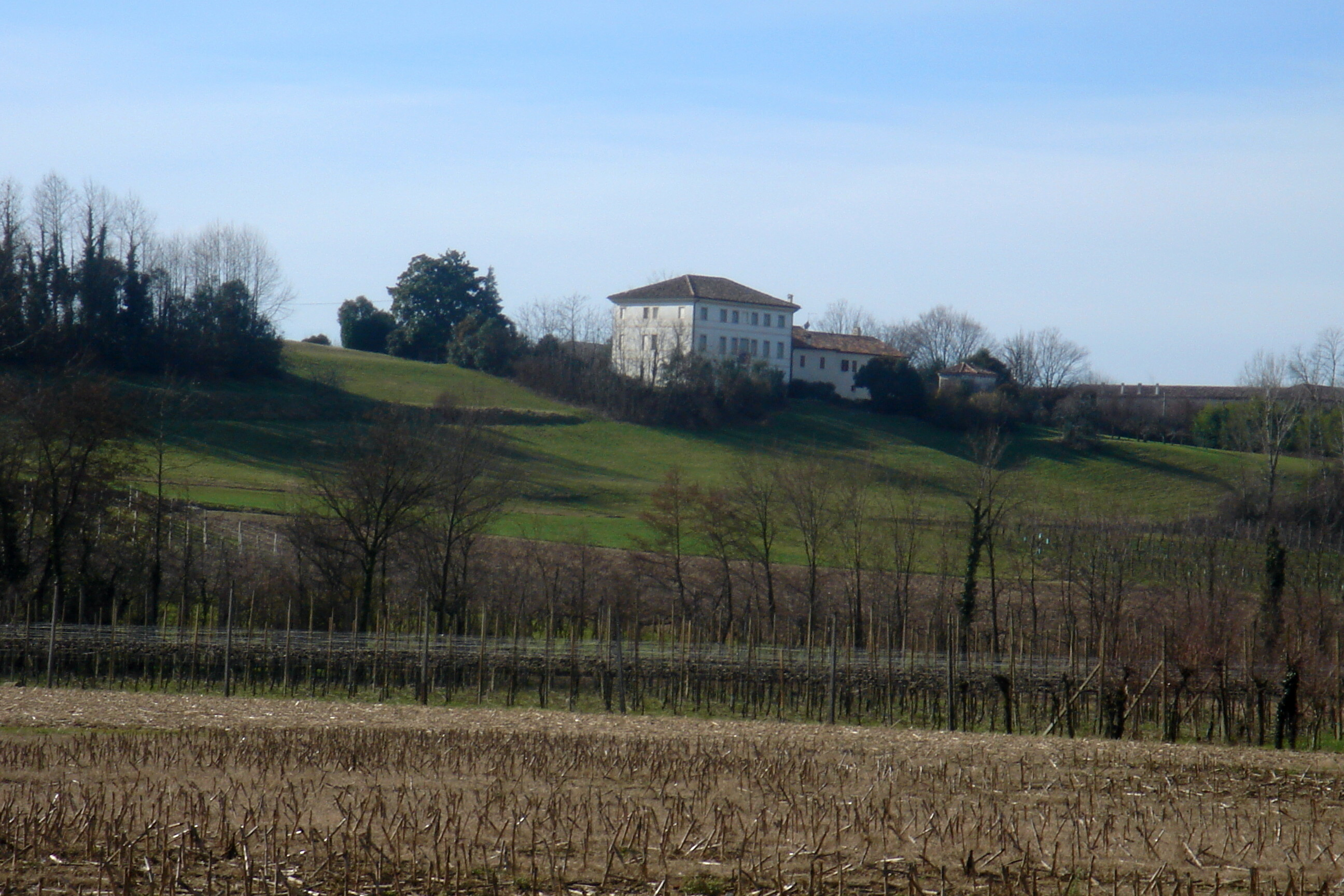
View of Col di Manza from Colle Umberto with Tiziano Vecellio's caséta (Villa Fabris).

Col di Manza (Venetian language - Col de Manzha) is a hill between the towns of Colle Umberto and San Fior in the province of Treviso in Italy, facing the higher hill of Castello Roganzuolo. It is notable as the site of a villa built for the painter Titian.
