= Tullio India il Vecchio =

Italian painter

Tullio India il Vecchio or Tullio India the Elder (after 1550 – 1624) was an Italian painter of the late-Renaissance period active mainly in Verona.

Zannandreis describes him as a fresco artist of non-mediocre talents, able to paint grotteschi and portraits, and respected for his copies of other works. His style is described as Raphaelesque. It is unclear who was his master, and what his relationship was to Bernardino India (1528–1590). He painted the exterior chiaroscuro frescoes of Palazzo Miniscalchi, Verona. He also painted for the churches of Santa Croce di Cittadella and San Felice di Centro in Verona.
