= Palazzo Miniscalchi =

Palace in italy

Coordinates: 45°26′42.73″N 10°59′44.58″E

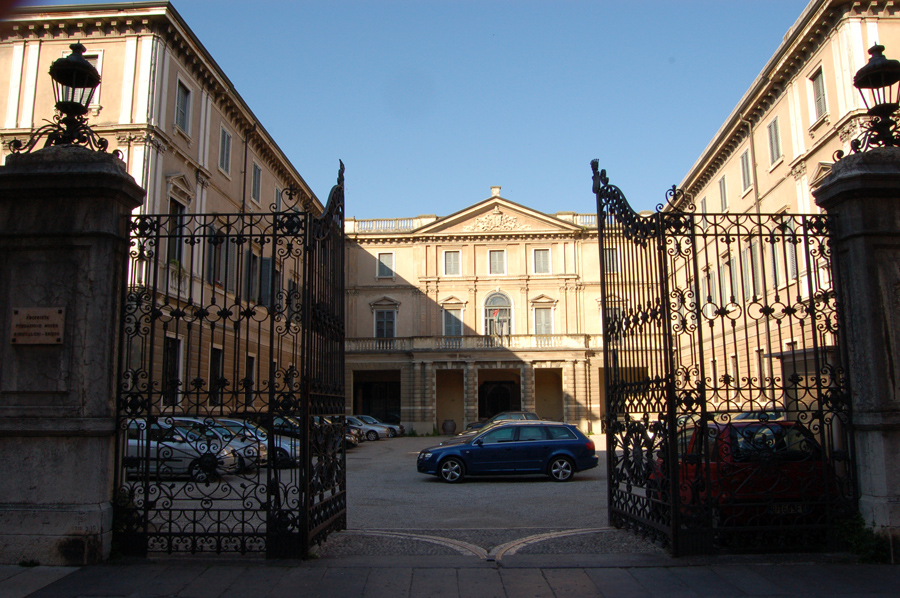
Photograph of the building of the Miniscalchi Erizzo foundation in Verona

The Palazzo Miniscalchi, adjacent to the 19th-century, Neoclassic style Palazzo Miniscalchi-Erizzo located on via Garibaldi, is a late-Gothic style palace with a facade on Via San Mamaso in central Verona, region of Veneto, Italy. The palace presently houses a museum and the Foundation for the Miniscalchi-Erizzo Museum. Access to the museum is through the Via San Mamaso entrance.

The museum displays an eclectic collection of artworks including small Renaissance bronzes, archeological finds from the region, weapons and armor, sacred works and utensils, maiolica, porcelain, tapestries, furniture, and paintings. It also displays the 17th-century Wunderkammer of Ludovico Moscardo.

The design of the 15th-century Palazzo Miniscalchi, with the elegant portal and second story mullioned windows is attributed to Angelo di Giovanni. His workshop was also active in the churches of San Tomaso Cantuariense and Sant’Eufemia. The faded façade frescoes were painted in the 16th century by Michelangelo Aliprandi and Tullio India il Vecchio. The palace was inhabited until 1977 by the Miniscalchi family. By 1990, the museum was inaugurated.
