= Rinaldo Zardini Palaeontology Museum =

Italian palaeontological museum

Rinaldo Zardini Palaeontology Museum (Italian, Museo Paleontologico "Rinaldo Zardini") is a palaeontological museum in Cortina d'Ampezzo, Italy. It is one of three museums administered by Le Regole d'Ampezzo, the other two being the Mario Rimoldi Modern Art Museum and the Regole of Ampezzo Ethnographic Museum. It is also a member of "DOMUS, the Network of Science Museums of the Veneto Dolomites". The paleontology museum opened in August 1975, exhibits Dolomite fossils. The museum bears the name of Rinaldo Zardini, a local researcher, who collected the materials and catalogued them. Thousands of his findings are part of the collections, though he collected over 1,000,000 articles in his lifetime.
