= Museo Rossimoda della calzatura =

Shoe museum in Stra, Venice, Italy

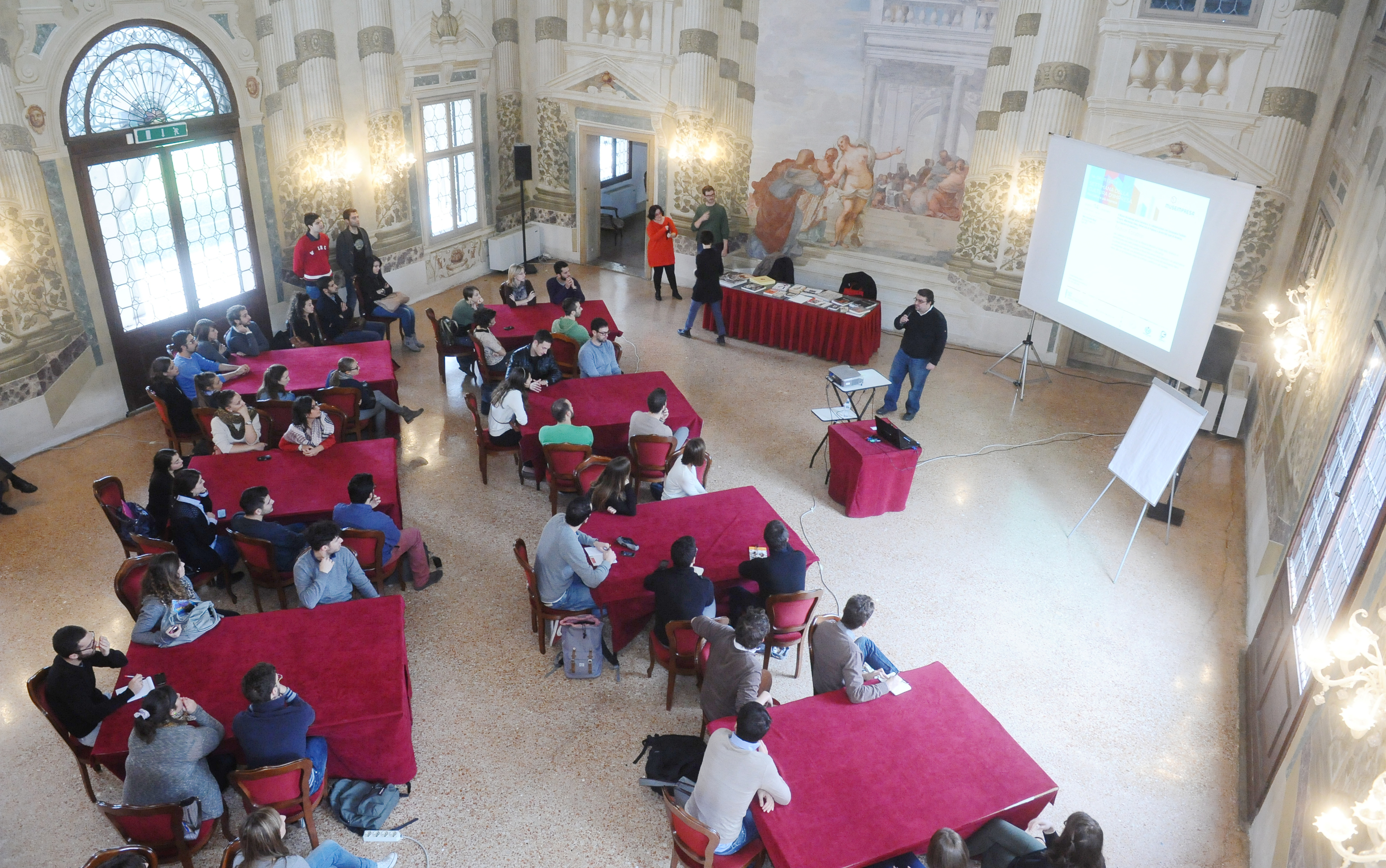
- Europeana Fashion Editathon in Museo Rossimoda della calzatura
- Location: Stra, Province of Venice, Italy
- Website: www.museodellacalzatura.it

The Museo Rossimoda della calzatura trans. Rossimoda Museum of the Shoe is located in Villa Foscarini Rossi at Stra, which lies along the Riviera del Brenta in the mainland portion of the province of Venice, Italy.

== History ==
The Museum was founded in 1995 under the will of Luigino Rossi, founder of the shoe company Rossimoda footwear. Originally conceived to document the history of the business of the company, the Museum has taken on a larger role to document the traditional footwear of the Riviera del Brenta, in addition to exhibiting footwear of the ancient Venetian tradition and of internationally recognized designers.

== Collections ==
The Museum houses more than 1,500 models from fashion designers all over the world. Along the exhibition, there are also works of art, and shoe models by contemporary artists such as Andy Warhol and Allen Jones.

In an exhibition area of 700 square meters, on two floors in the prestigious halls seventeenth century, there are the prototypes of the company of Vigo collaborations with leading fashion houses in the world. The ground floor includes American designers such as Donna Karan, Marc by Marc Jacobs, Porsche and upstairs are rooms with European and Mediterranean designers including Emilio Pucci, Yves Saint Laurent, Givenchy, Dior, Roger Vivier, Fendi, Christian Lacroix, Céline, Kenzo who have been devoted more space.

The museum also includes prints, drawings and sculptures from the private collection of art by Luigino Rossi: the original sketches of Lacroix and Karl Lagerfeld, the reproductions of prints by Andy Warhol, and sculptures by Allen Jones and Daniel Spoerri.

== Gallery ==
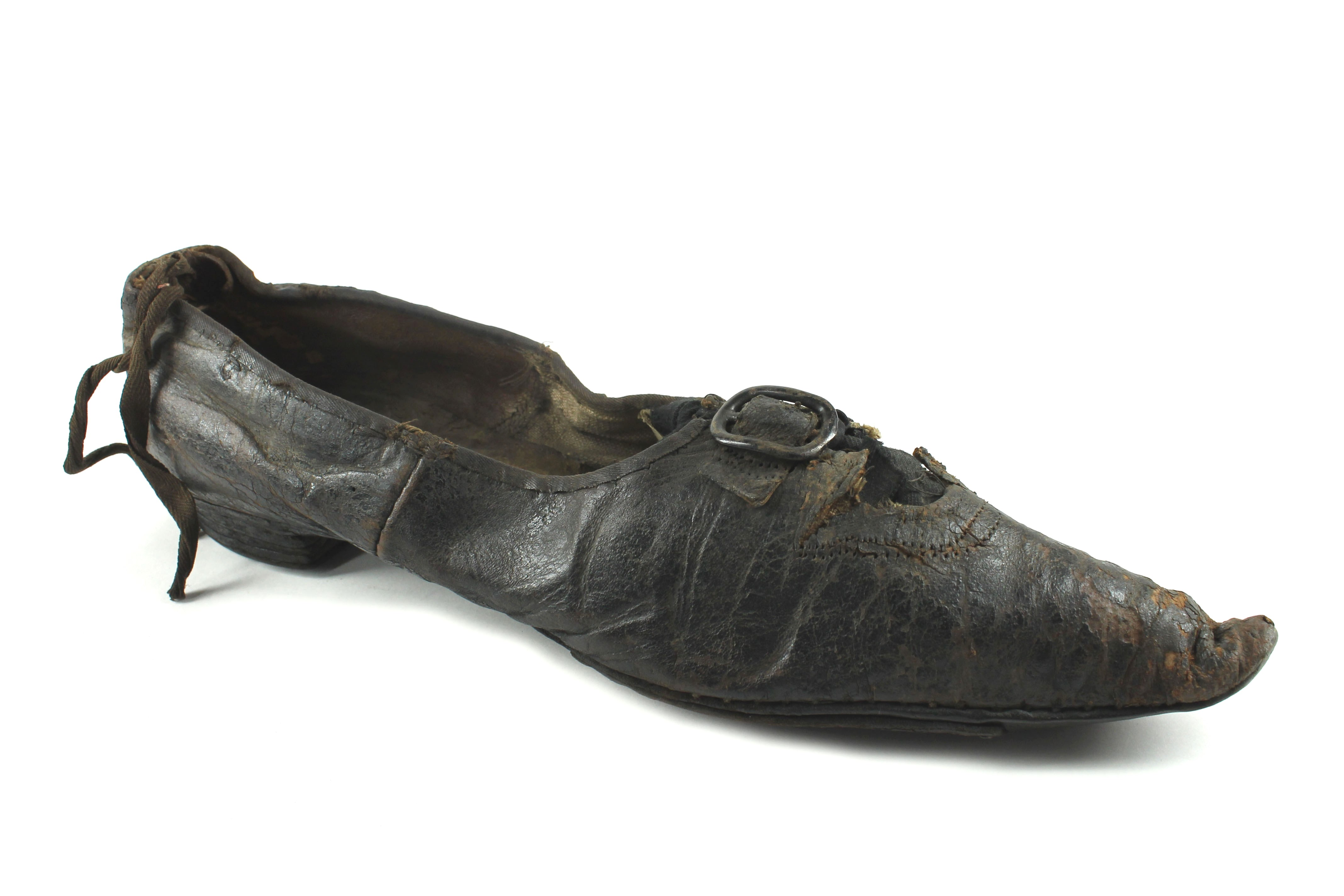
17th century man shoe

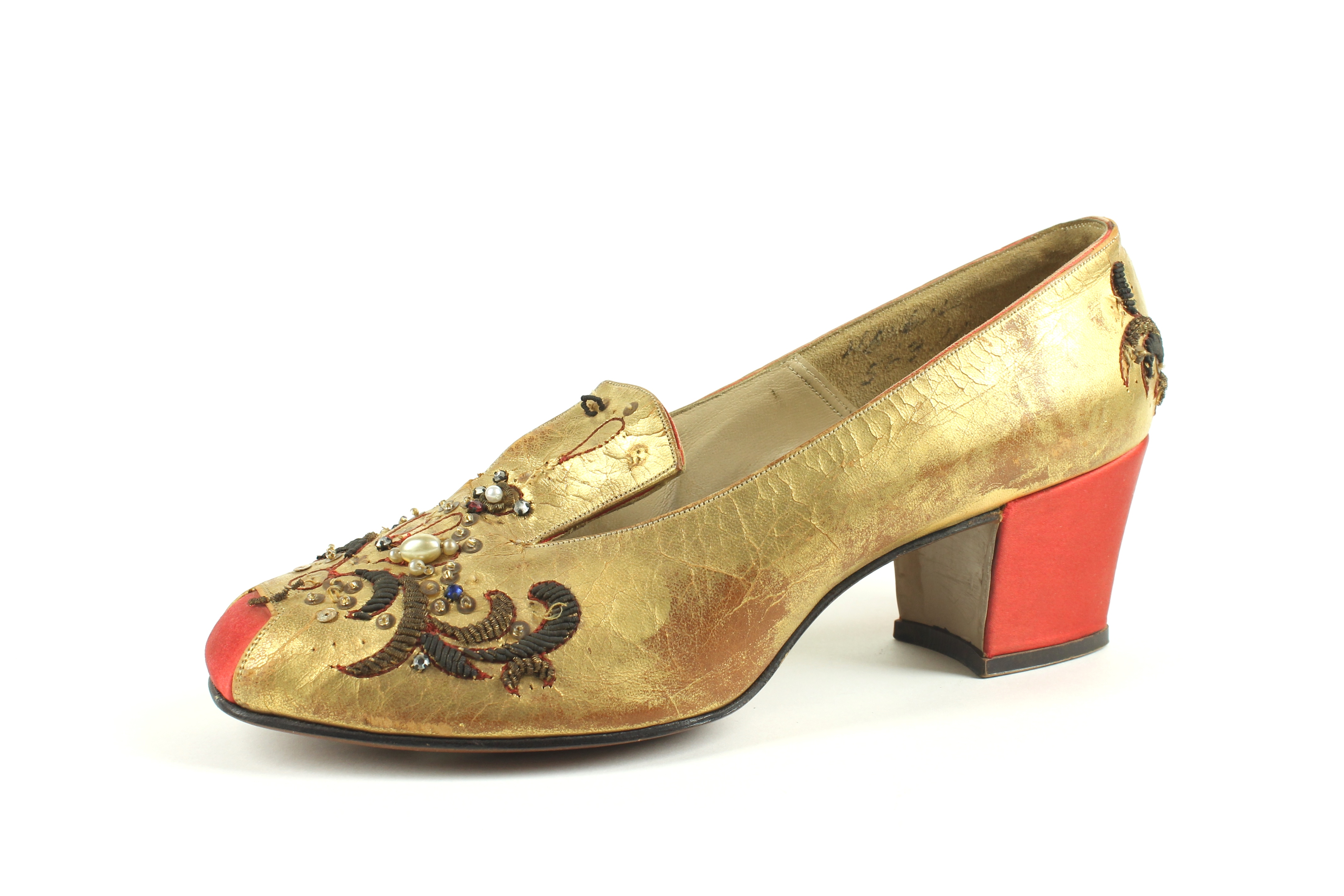
18th century shoe

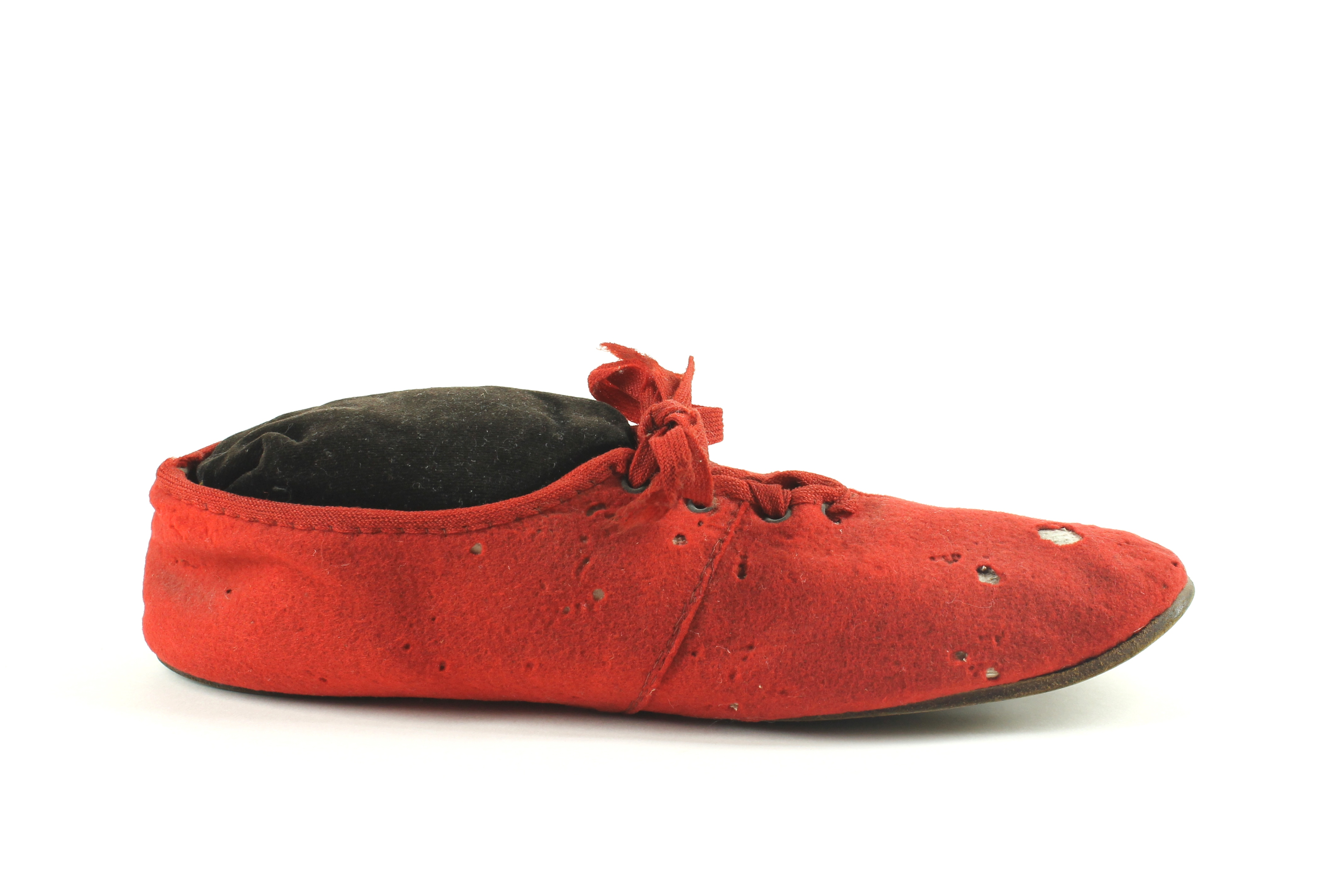
19th century clerical shoe

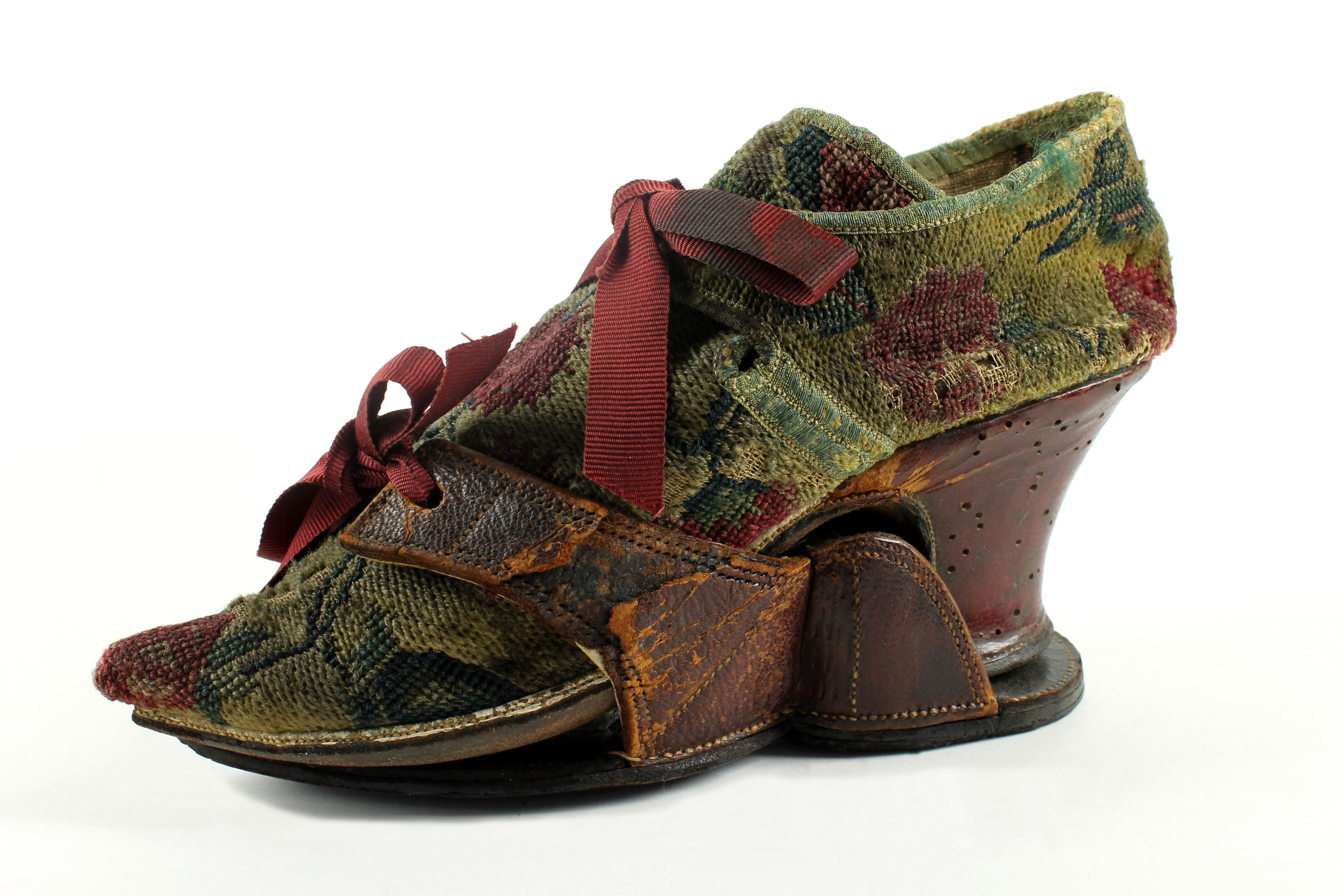
Venetian woman shoe
