= Mario Rimoldi Modern Art Museum =

Museum in Italy

Coordinates: 46.5370°N 12.1374°E

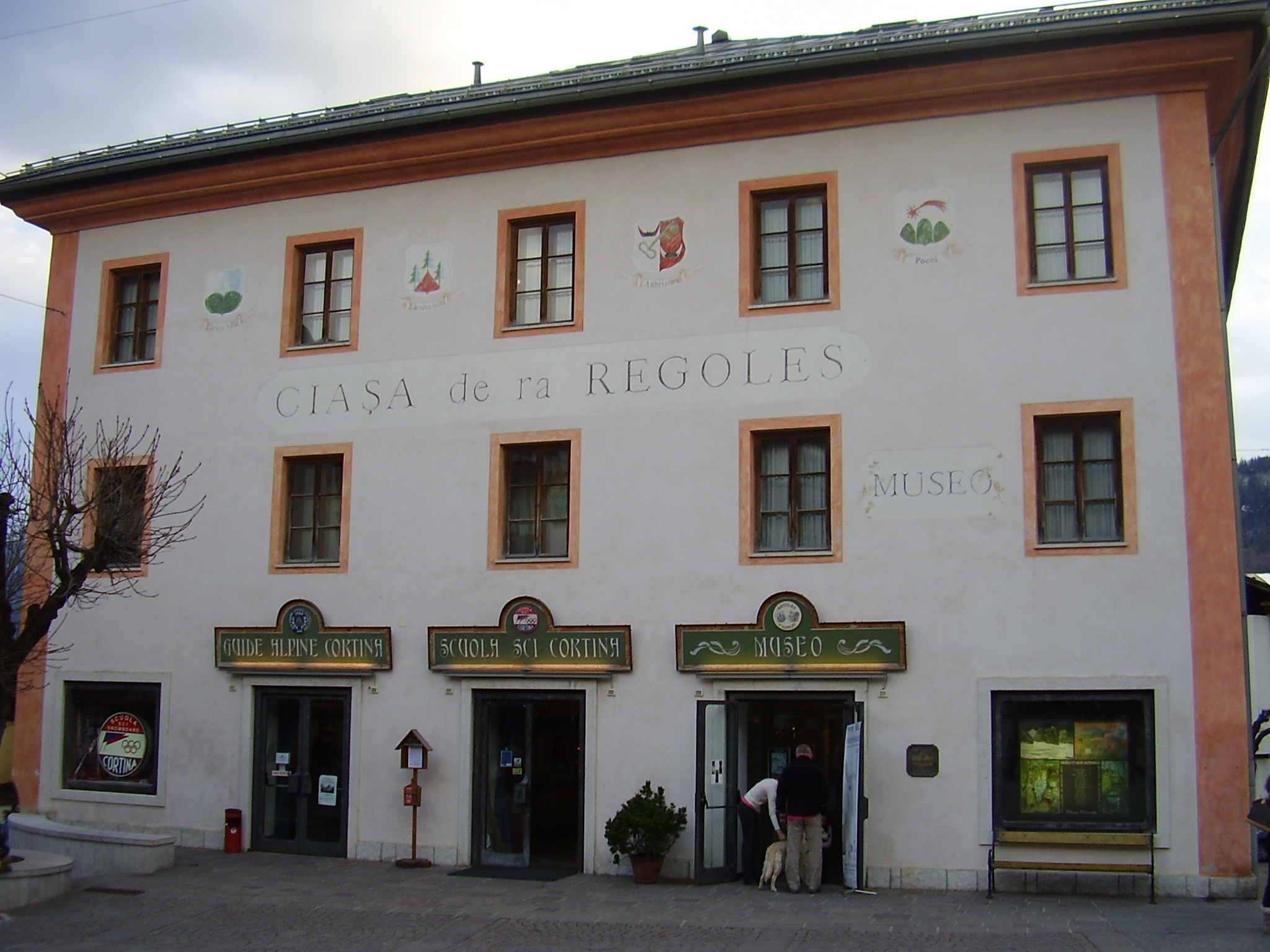
La Ciaṣa de ra Regoles ("House of the Rules") in Cortina d'Ampezzo, Italy.

Mario Rimoldi Modern Art Museum (Museo d'Arte Moderna "Mario Rimoldi") is a contemporary and modern art museum in Cortina d'Ampezzo, Italy. It is one of three museums administered by Le Regole d'Ampezzo, the other two being the Rinaldo Zardini Palaeontology Museum and the Regole of Ampezzo Ethnographic Museum. It opened in 1974 after a donation from Rosa Braun, the widow of Mario Rimoldi. Rimoldi's collection was displayed in 1941, it moved to the Regole d'Ampezzo in 1963, and by 1995, the collection contained 364 works of art. The collection is said to contain some of the most influential Italian art produced between World War I and World War II, and provides a perspective of the modern art movement in Veneto, Italy pre-1940. The museum's permanent exhibition includes works by Filippo De Pisis, Felice Carena, Pio Semeghini, Renato Guttuso, Tullio Garbari, and Massimo Campigli. The museum is also used as a venue for live music performances.
