= House of Carlo Goldoni =

Casa di Carlo Goldoni
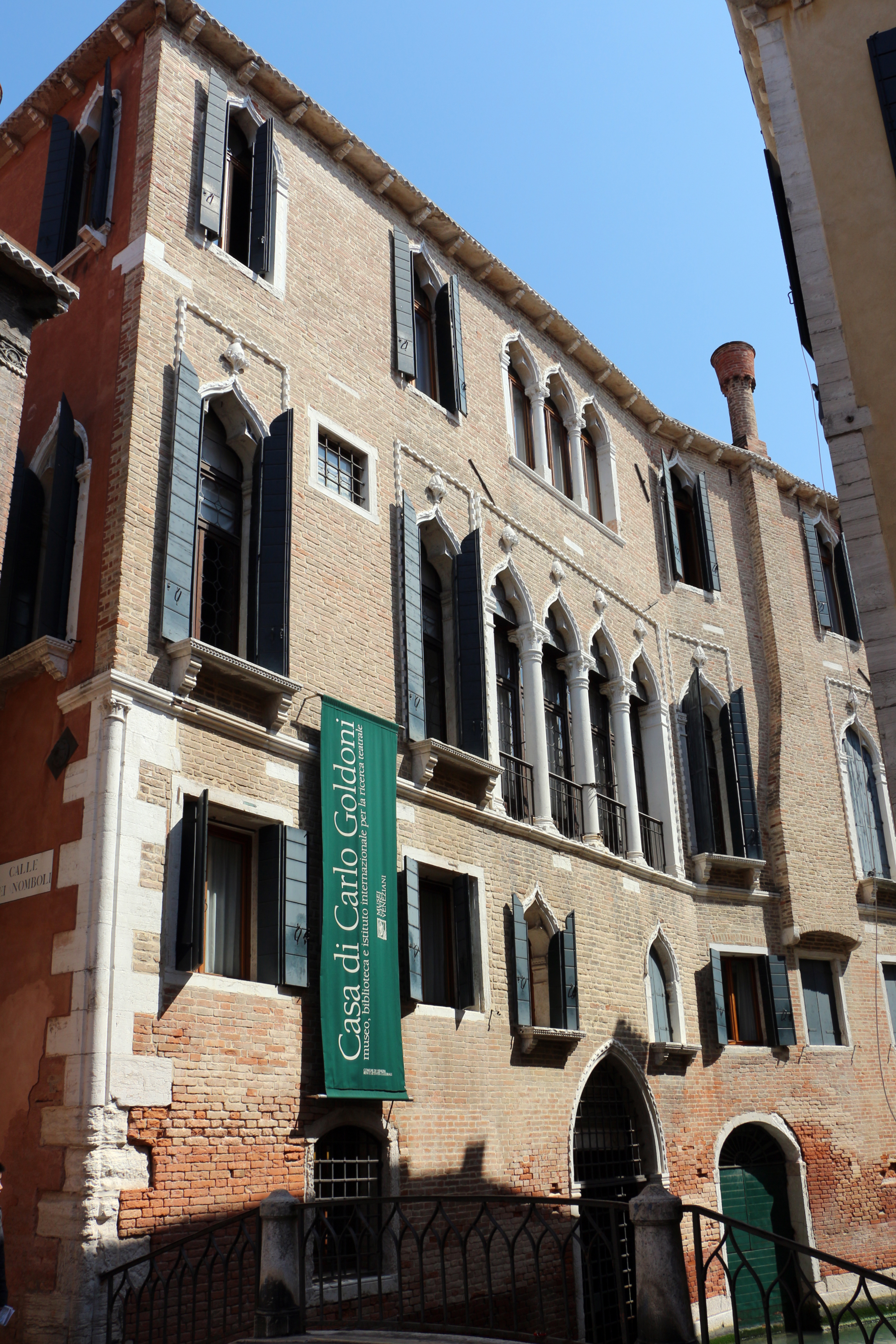
- Established: 1931
- Location: San Polo 2794, 30125 Venice, Italy
- Coordinates: 45°26′10″N 12°19′42″E
- Type: Museum, Historic site, Theatre Studies Library
- Director: Chiara Squarcina
- Website: carlogoldoni.visitmuve.it

The House of Carlo Goldoni, or in Italian, Casa di Carlo Goldoni is a writer's house museum located in a small palace or palazzetto, that served as the residence of the Italian playwright Carlo Goldoni. Located in San Polo, Venice, it is now a museum and library of theater studies.

== History ==
The small Gothic style palace is located on Calle dei Nomboli 2793. Originally property of the Rizzi family, it was bought in the 17th century by the grandfather of Carlo Goldoni.

The House of Carlo Goldoni and Library of Theatre Studies (Casa di Goldoni e Biblioteca di Studi Teatrali) a museum managed by the Fondazione Musei Civici di Venezia which exhibits collections on Goldoni's life and works, as well as artefacts relating to Venetian theatre.
