= Fondaco dei Turchi =

Historical building in Venice

Coordinates: 45°26′30.78″N 12°19′43.34″E

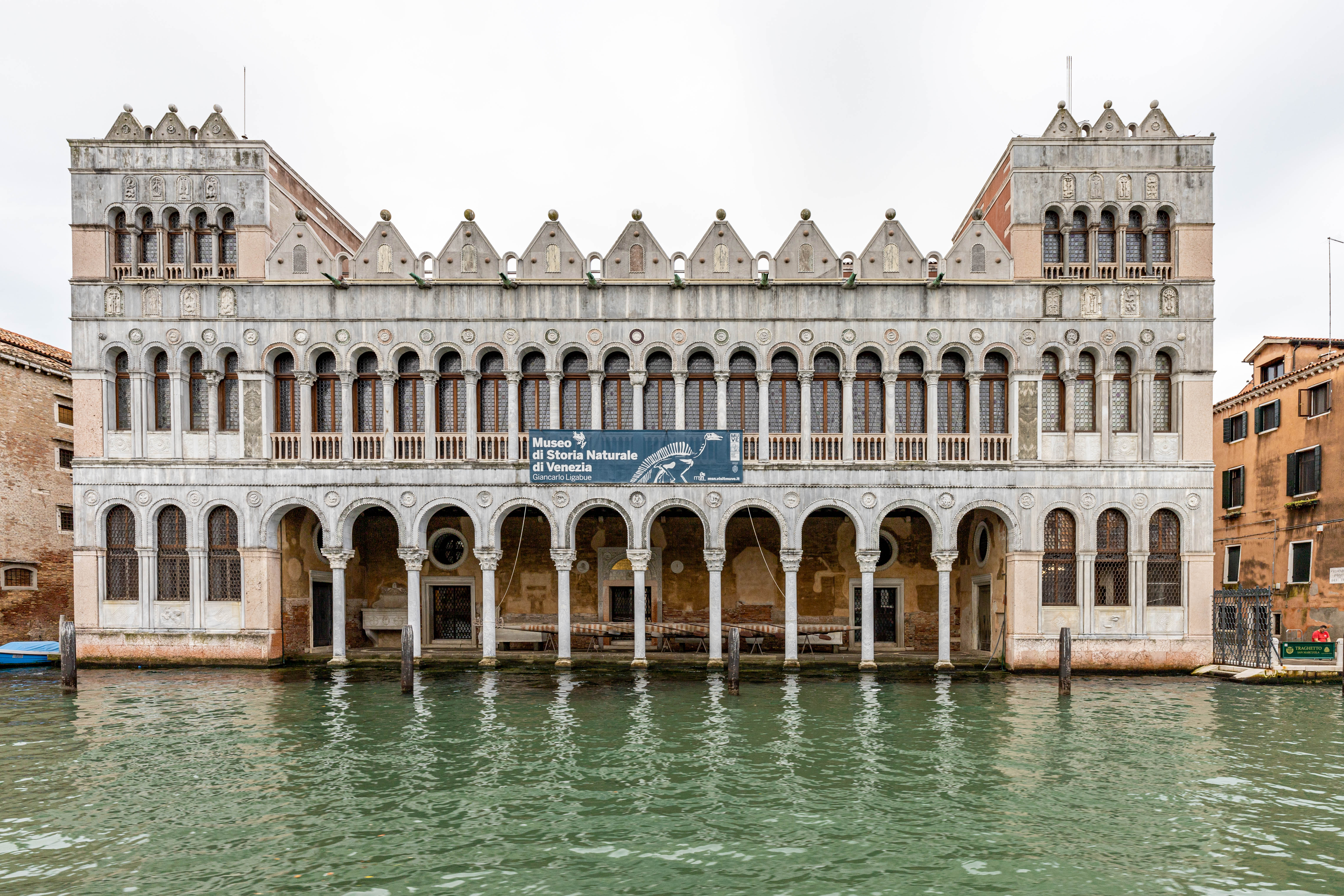
Modern-day Fondaco dei Turchi

The Fondaco dei Turchi (Venetian: Fontego dei Turchi, Turkish: Türk Hanı) is a palazzo in classical Venetian style, later referred to as the Turks' Inn, on the Grand Canal of Venice, northeastern Italy.

Since the early 17th century until the 19th century, the Fondaco Dei Turchi served as a residence for Venice's Ottoman Turkish population (hence "dei Turchi"). The fondaco (from Arabic: fonduk) functioned as a combination home, warehouse, and market for the Turkish traders. The structure, commissioned by Giacomo Palmier, took inspiration from Islamic, renaissance and Byzantine architecture. It was rebuilt by the government in 1869. Today it houses Venice's Natural History Museum.

== History and function ==
Scholars are unsure of the patron and architect of this building, but it is known that the fondaco originated as a private palace. In 1381, the Republic of Venice acquired the palace and granted it to the Marquis of Ferrara, Nicolò II d'Este (r. 1361–1388). For over two centuries, the palace was known as the Palace of the Dukes of Ferrara, where it served as a residence for ambassadors from the city of Ferrara, Italy, and an occasional stopping place for rulers of the d'Este family.

In 1597, the Duke of Ferrara, Alfonso II d'Este (r. 1559–1597), died without an heir. In turn, Alfonso II's cousin Cesare d'Este (r. 1557–1628) inherited the Duke's estate but faced opposition by Alfonso's sisters, Anna d'Este and Lucrezia d'Este, who contested Cesare's inheritance. To complicate matters, Pope Clement VIII (r. 1592–1605) seized the city of Ferrara and sent his nephew, Pietro Aldobrandini, who had become a cardinal in 1593, to occupy the palace, which he did in 1598. Ultimately, Anna d'Este won her suit, and transferred her share of Alfonso II's property to Cardinal Aldobrandini, while Lucrezia d'Este died before her suit had been settled. Although the situation was complex with claims and counter claims, in the end Cesare sold the Fondaco dei Turchi in March 1602 to the Venetian senator (and later, Doge of Venice) Antonio Priuli. This sale marked the transition from private ownership to local Venetian control, in essence to the Republic of Venice. Some sources say the sale took place in 1621.

Under Priuli's control, the building was leased to an operator who transformed it into a hospice and trading hub, known as a fondaco. The space catered to merchants from the Ottoman Empire, collectively referred to by the Venetians as "Turks." Part of the decision to supply housing to Ottoman merchants was because for most of the sixteenth century, the merchants occupied multiple residences and many were "houses of ill repute." The Ottoman imported much needed supplies, like wheat, but also goods like cotton, raw silk, leather, spices, and calcined ashes, a core ingredient for the glass makers of Murano.

After the building's use as a fondaco for Ottoman traders, the building became dilapidated and was completely restored between 1860 and 1880.

=== Ottoman quarters ===
Venice was pivotal in Mediterranean trade as textiles and other luxury goods were exchanged with the Ottoman Empire. Venetian merchants opened extensive trade networks, importing spices, silk, and other commodities from the East in return for fine textiles manufactured to Ottoman tastes.

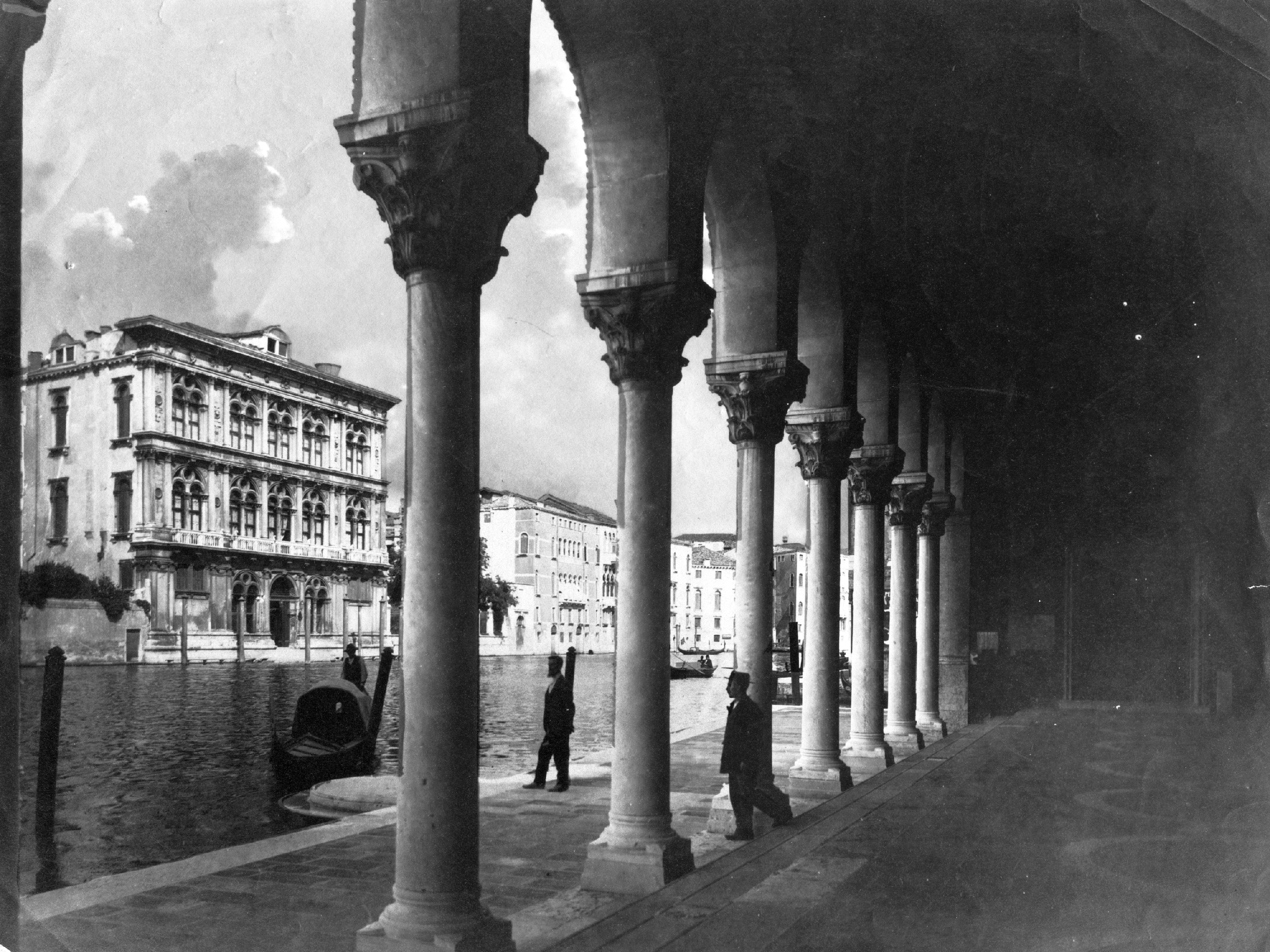
Fondaco's access to the Grand Canal

From the early 17th century until 1838, the fondaco served as a residence for Venice's Ottoman Turkish population (hence "dei Turchi"). The fondaco (from Arabic: fonduk) functioned as a combination home, warehouse, and market for the Turkish traders, much like the Fondaco dei Tedeschi served as headquarters and restricted living quarters for German foreigners.

A number of restrictions were placed on the fondaco and its residents, including certain times one was able to enter and leave the fondaco, as well as on trading. Ottoman merchants, including Jews, Armenians, and Greeks were central to Venice commerce. They served as intermediaries who imported essential raw materials like silk and spices into Venice while exporting Venetian textiles to the Ottoman Empire. Their involvement not only strengthened trade networks, but also highlighted Venice's cosmopolitan identity and reliance on Ottoman markets. Ottoman influence shaped Venetian production, ensuring goods aligned with Eastern preferences, which further cemented Venice's role as a dynamic trading hub in the Mediterranean. After the Venetian Republic was conquered and abolished by Napoleon Bonaparte in 1797, the Turkish traders continued to live in the palazzo until 1838.

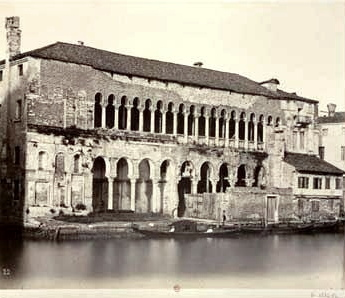
Fondaco dei Turchi 1860, before "restoration"

=== Partial demolition ===
The Fondaco dei Turchi was mostly rebuilt by the government in 1869. Only the original canal-side façade survives, with everything else behind it was demolished, therefore surviving the architectural floor plans, provided a good idea of the purpose and layout of the original palace. A set of early floor plans in the d'Este archives of Modena provides a clue to what was lost in the nineteenth-century demolition. The inscriptions on the ground-floor plan identify surrounding streets and waterways, allow scholars to identify the structure as the Fondaco dei Turchi. With notations such as Fondamenta Sopra il Rio, Canal Grand and the Cale del Traghetto a San Marcuola on the plans helps to understand the precise boundaries today. The undated drawings were signed by Cesare Torello (known as Franco), a draftsman, stonemason, architect, and surveyor who is document in both Venice and Padua between 1578 and 1606. Scholars believe that the drawings were made in 1600 or 1601.

=== Present-day function ===
Today, Fondaco dei Turchi houses the Natural History Museum of Venice Giancarlo Ligabue. The museum is not dedicated to the history of the building itself, but it provides information and history related to fossils and paleontology. The Natural History Museum of Venice Giancarlo Ligabue promotes scientific research, organizes educational activities for schools, offers educational services in the scientific-naturalistic field, and opens to the public naturalistic library.

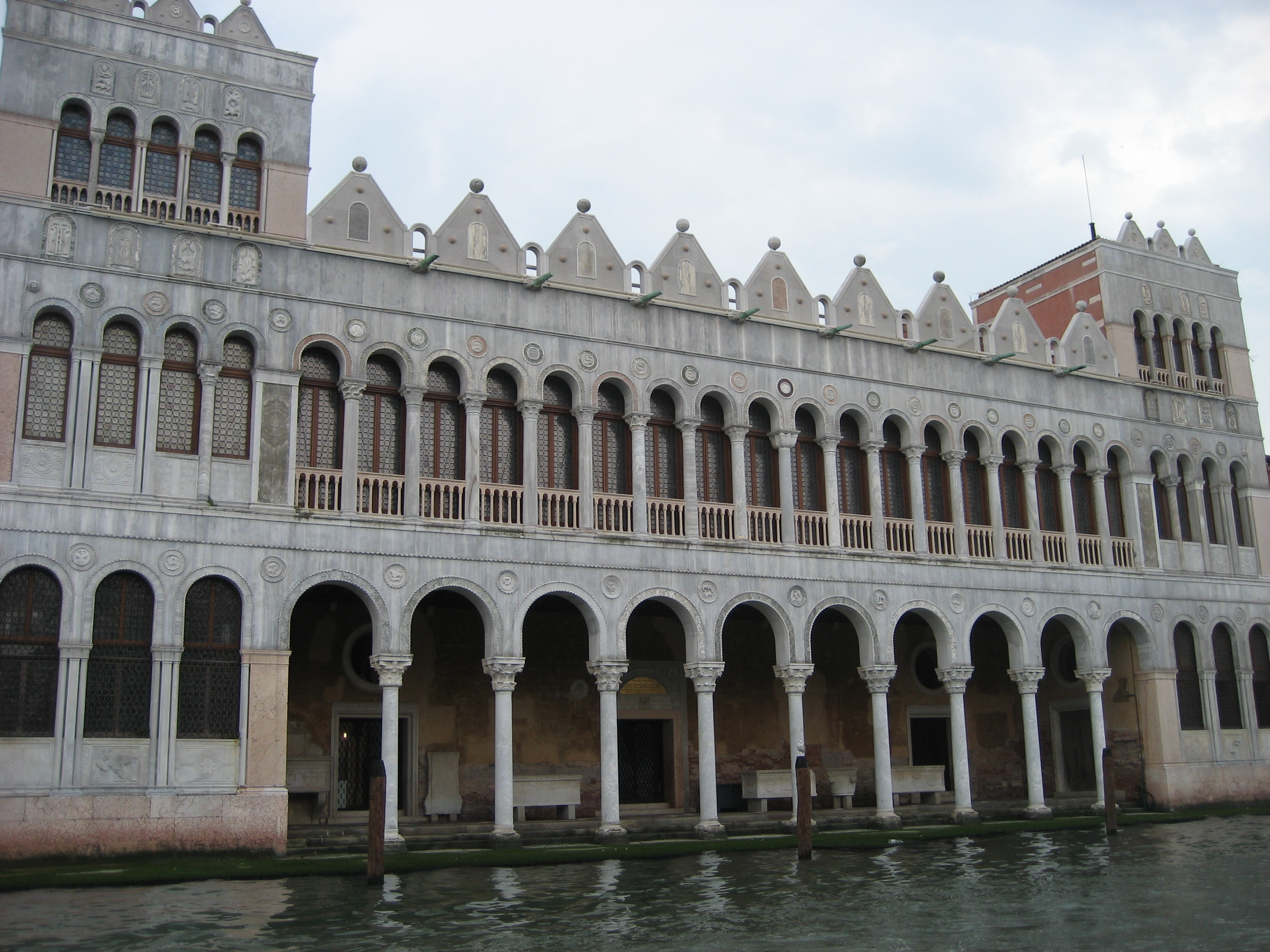
Fondaco dei Turchi façade

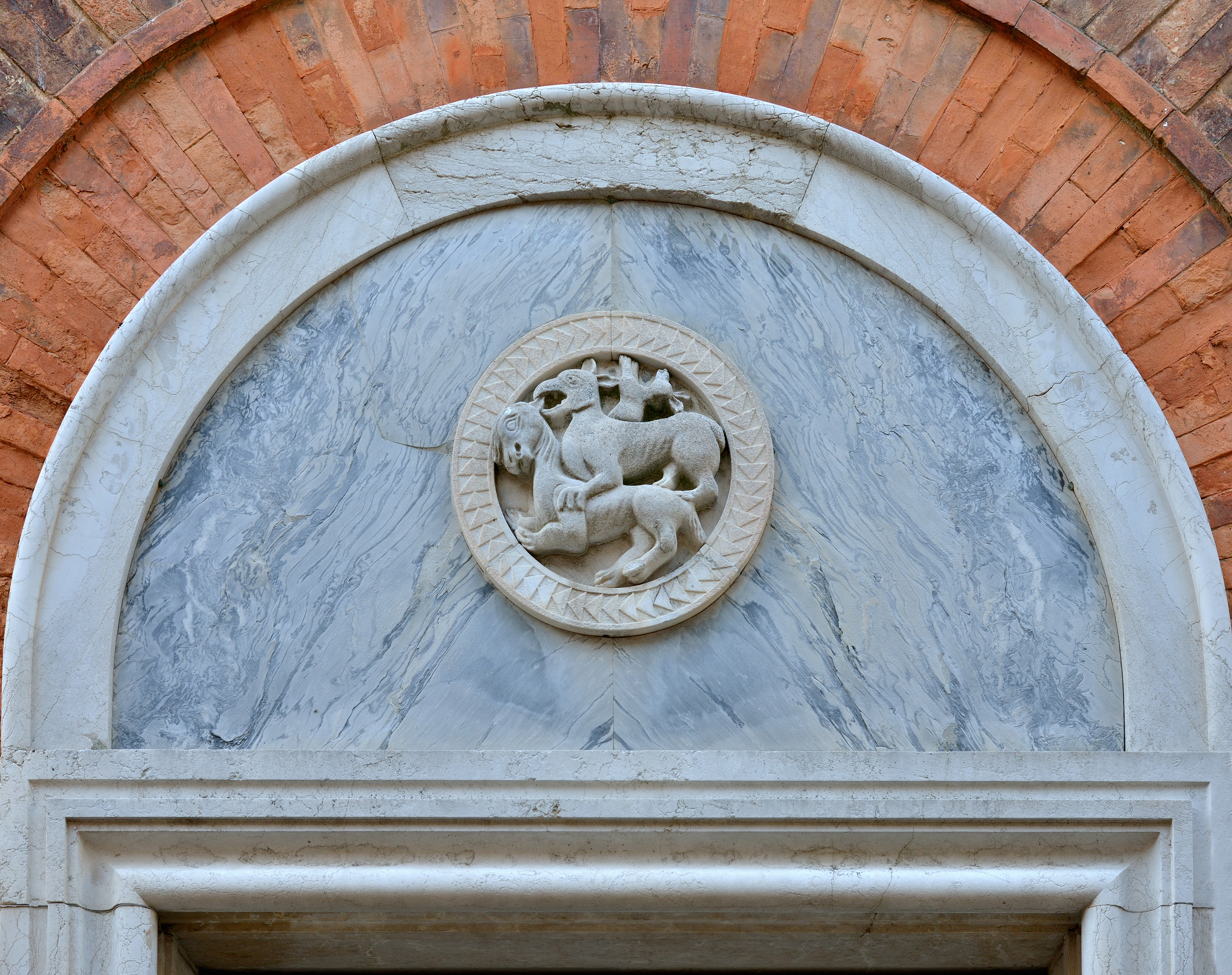
Medallion on entrance

== Style of the façade ==
Venice, was a major center for cultural exchange, with its trade routes spanning sub-Saharan Africa and Asia. Venice connected the major powers at the time; the Byzantine Empire, Ottoman Empire and the Mamluk Sultanate. Long term relations with the East through trade and shared cultural interests, are reflected in its Islamic influenced architecture.

Venice was founded after Rome's fall and lacked ancient Roman ruins, found in other modern day Italian cities. Hence, Venetian architecture, with no stylistic history, Venice took inspiration from various cultures. Venetian architecture was also distinct due to its marsh terrain. Unlike most other cities in Europe, Venice has not changed much due to its lack of roadways. In Jacopo de' Barbari, Bird's-Eye View Map of Venice, from 1500, most buildings are still recognizable today, including the Fondaco dei Turchi. In the print, the building is found in its original state, albeit in miniature and out of proportion.

In early the Renaissance, Venetian architecture drew upon a variety of architectural elements from different cultures, including classical and Roman, Gothic, and Islamic. Gothic architecture such as quatrefoils, pointed arches, trefoils, and bar tracery were combined with Islamic inspired elements, such as ogee arches. These influences created a unique style found on many iconic structures, such as the façades of Ca' d'Oro and Fondaco dei Turchi.

Classical and Roman architectural elements, on the façade of the Fondaco dei Turchi, include medallions, such as found on the entrance, and columns. These emphasized harmony, visual clarity and uniformity. Renaissance elements include an arcades and a balustrade railing on the second floor.

The horseshoe arches on the façade of Fondaco dei Turchi, along with crested rooflines (merlons) are distinctively Islamic. Furthermore, the Fondaco consists of axial plan, which has roots in from the Islamic world. Another element found is Islamic architecture and an essential focus of the plan of the Fondaco dei Turchi is its central courtyard. Hallways for pedestrians on the upper floors followed a circuit, with the courtyard in the center. as a focal point.
