= Museo di Storia Naturale di Venezia =

Coordinates: 45.4418°N 12.3286°E

Venice Museum of Natural History
- Museo di Storia Naturale di Venezia
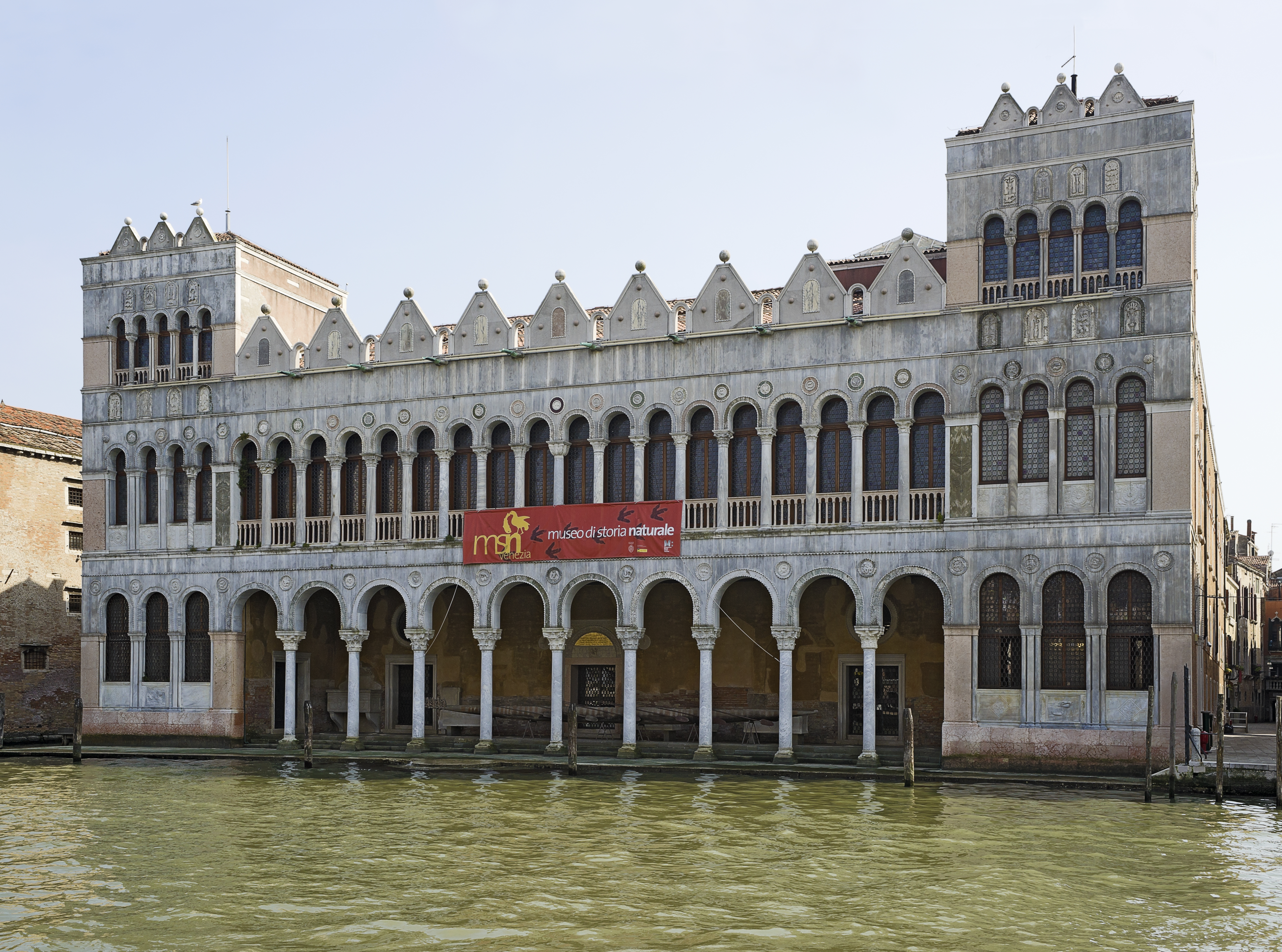
- View of the museum building from the Grand Canal.
- Established: 1923
- Location: Santa Croce 1730, 30135 Venice, Italy
- Type: Natural history museum, Historic site
- Directors: Luca Mizzan and Mauro Bon
- Website: www.msn.visitmuve.it

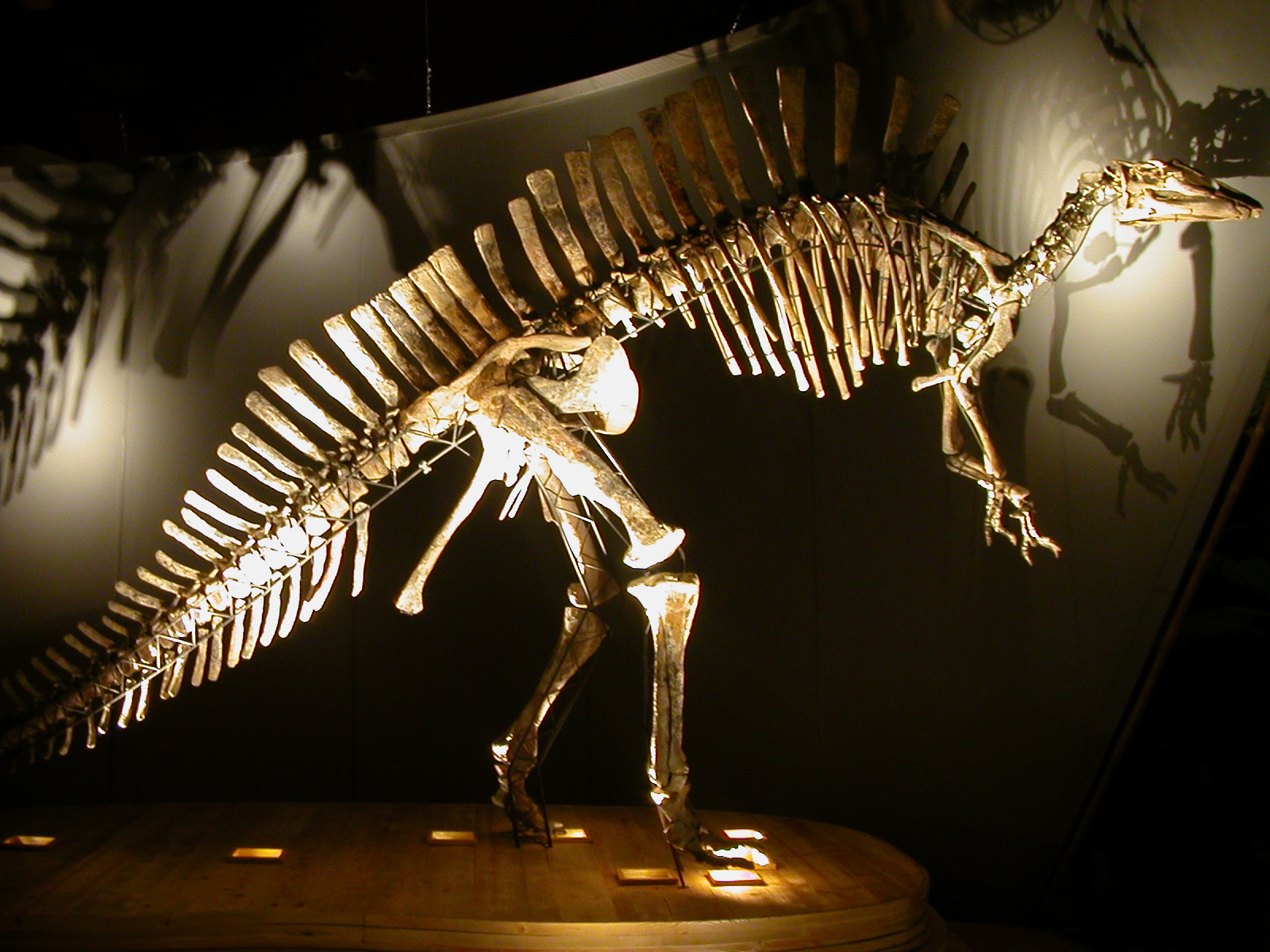
Fossilized Ouranosaurus nigeriensis dinosaur skeleton at the museum.

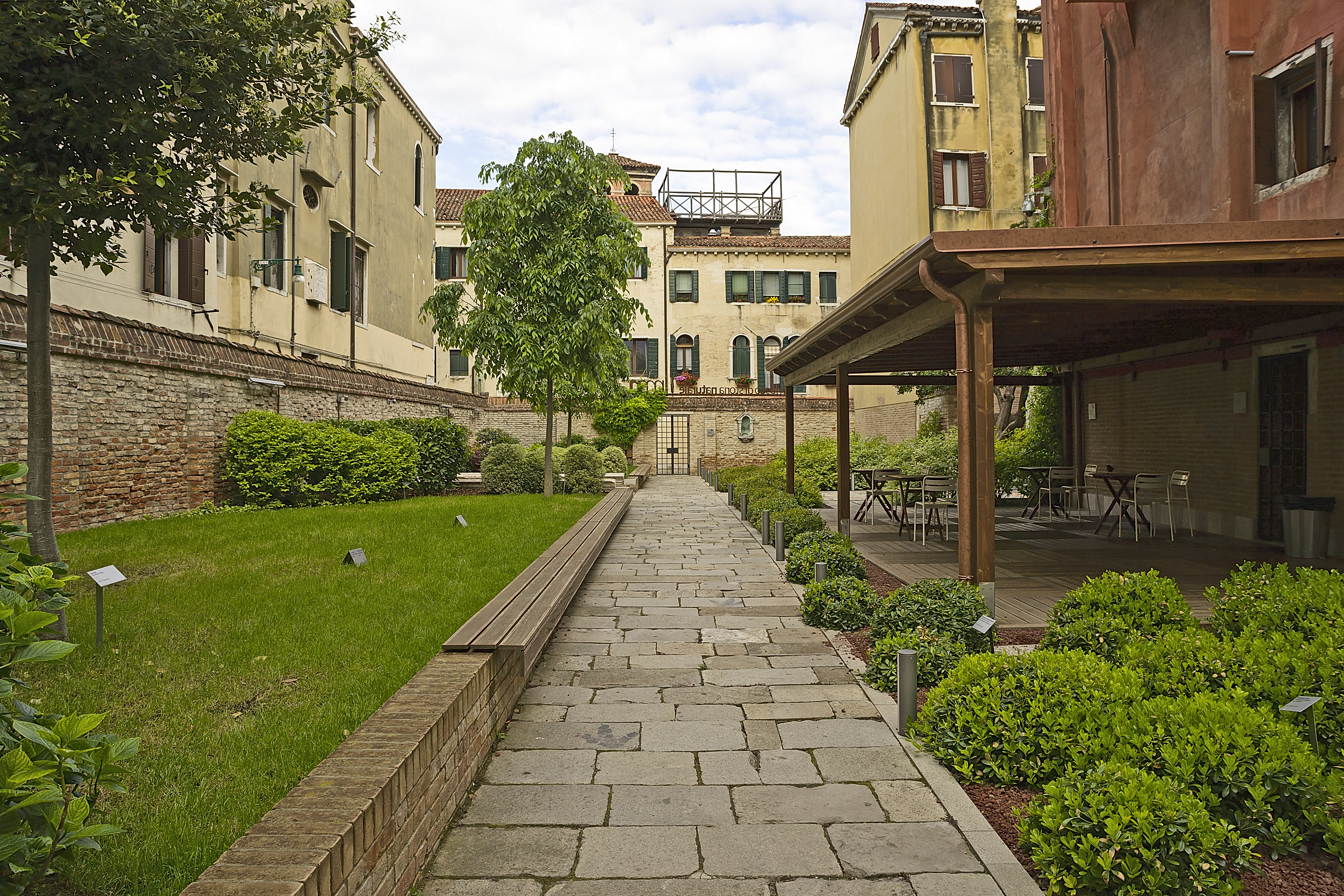
Museum garden

Museo di Storia Naturale di Venezia (English: Natural History Museum of Venice) is a museum of natural history housed in Fondaco dei Turchi, located on the Grand Canal, Venice, Italy. Its collections relate mainly to the natural history of the Venetian lagoon that surrounds the city. Today it is one of the 11 venues managed by the Fondazione Musei Civici di Venezia. It is rated the best natural history museum in Italy by TripAdvisor.

== Building and history ==
The museum is located in the Fondaco dei Turchi, originally built in the 13th century as a palazzo for the Pesaro family. It is built in the Venetian Byzantine style, being originally used as a trading depot for goods from the East.

In 1381, the building was given to the lord of Ferrara, Niccolò II d'Este. In 1621, it became the fondaco (or fontego) for Turkish merchants, a place for them to live and do business, until 1838. From 1865, the building was extensively restored. After this work, it housed the Museo Correr and then the Natural History Museum from 1969.

== Museum ==
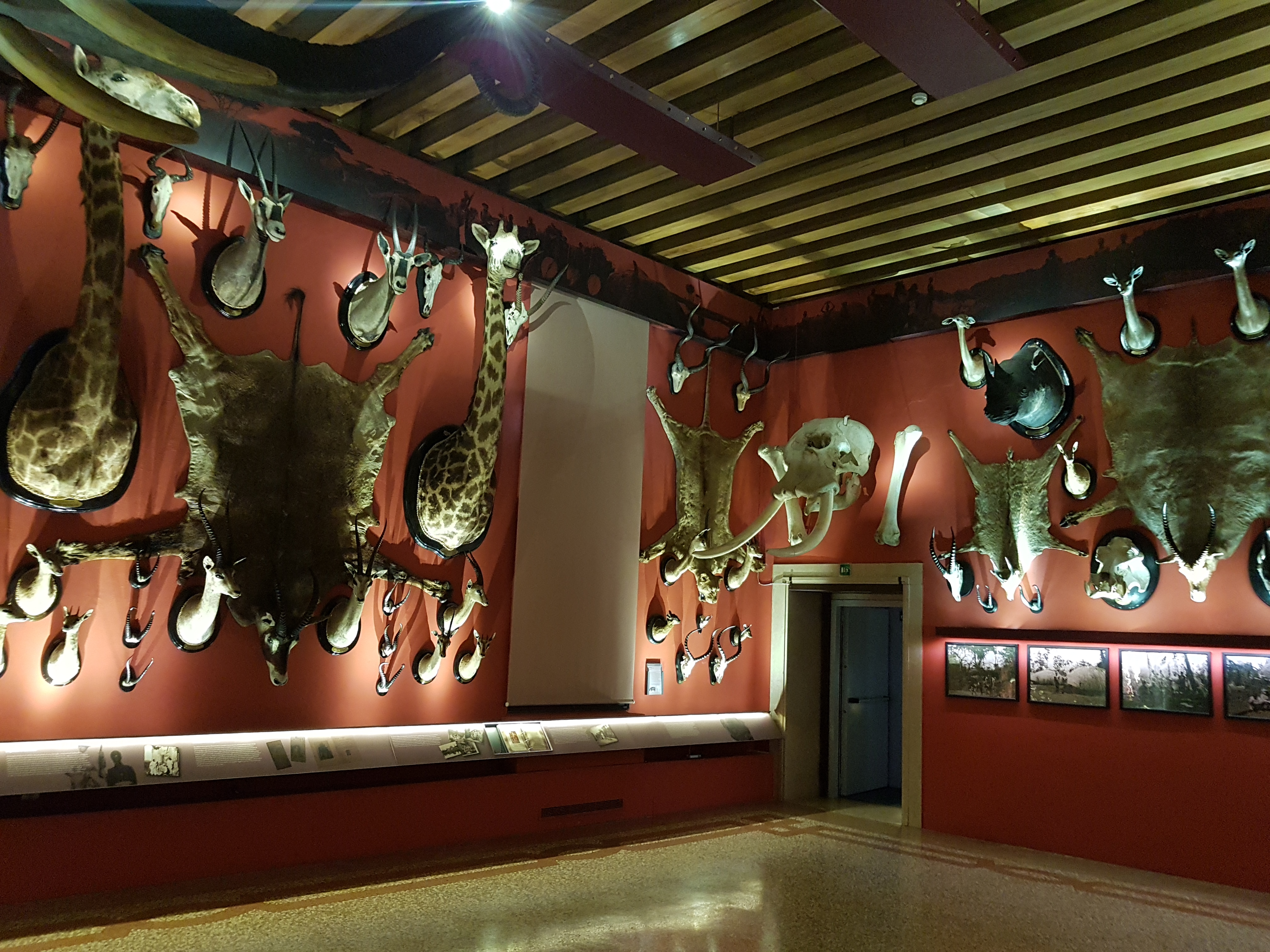

The Natural History Museum in Venice was founded in 1923 to hold and display a number of scientific collections from the Museo Correr and the Istituto Veneto di Scienze, Lettere ed Arti, among others. This has subsequently been expanded, with around two million objects in the collection. These cover botanical, entomological, and zoological specimens, fossils, and ethnographic collections. The library has over 40,000 books.

The museum is run by the Fondazione Musei Civici Venezia (MUVE).

== Directors ==
Michelangelo Minio – (1923–1946)

Antonio Giordani Soika – (1946–1978)

Enrico Ratti – (1983–2008)

Luca Mizzan – (2008–present)

== See also ==
- Fondaco dei Turchi
- MUVE
