= Albino Luciani Diocesan Museum =

Coordinates: 45.9764°N 12.2931°E

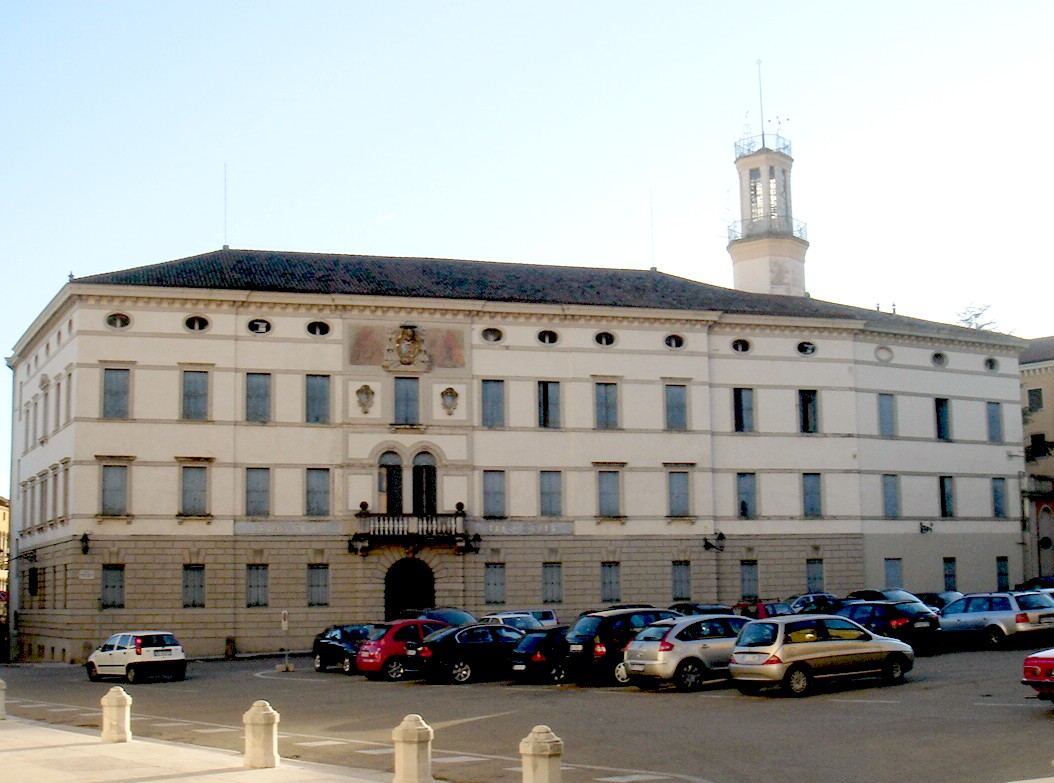
Facade of the seminary in which the museum is housed.

The Albino Luciani Diocesan Museum (Museo diocesano Albino Luciani) is a museum of Christian art in the Ceneda district of Vittorio Veneto in northern Italy, located on the top floor of the episcopal seminary in the piazza Giovanni Paolo I.

It houses works from several churches in the Roman Catholic Diocese of Vittorio Veneto, including paintings by Titian, Cima da Conegliano, Il Pordenone, Pomponio Amalteo, Palma il Giovane, and Francesco da Milano.

== Bibliography ==
- Giacomini Miari Erminia e Mariani Paola, Musei religiosi in Italia, Milano 2005, pp. 326 – 327
- Zuffi Stefano, I Musei Diocesani in Italia. Primo volume, Palazzolo sull'Oglio (BS) 2003, pp. 74 – 77
