= Lace Museum =

- Museo del merletto
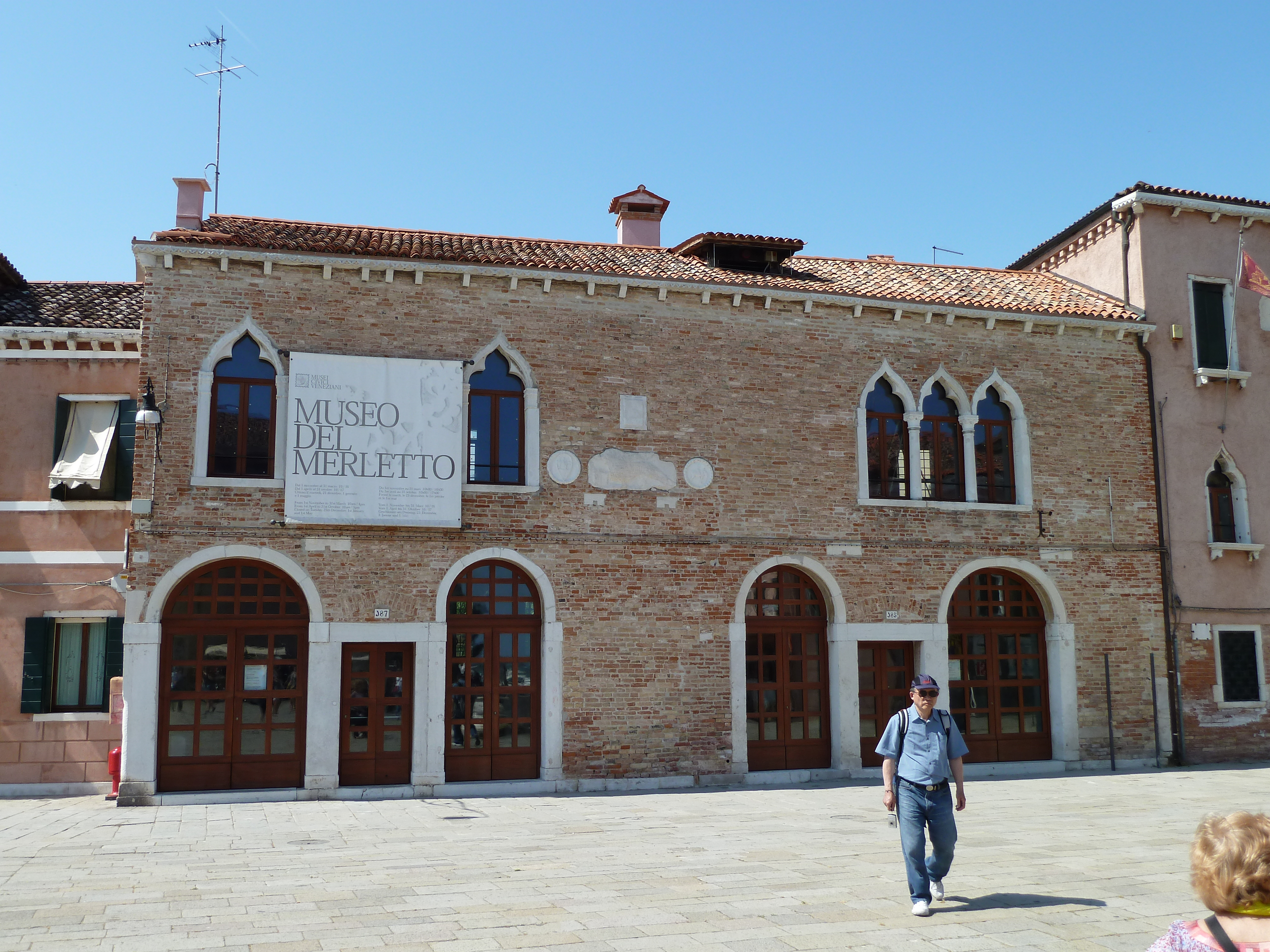
- The Lace museum
- Established: 1978
- Location: Piazza Galuppi 187, 30012 Burano, Italy
- Coordinates: 45°29′5″N 12°25′7″E
- Type: Museum, Historic site
- Accreditation: Musei Civici di Venezia
- Collections: Laces
- Collection size: 200
- Director: Chiara Squarcina
- Website: museomerletto.visitmuve.it/en/home/

The Lace Museum (in Italian: Museo del merletto) is located at the historic palace of Podestà of Torcello, in Galuppi square, on the island of Burano, near Venice, Italy.

The palace was seat of the famous Burano Lace School from 1872 to 1970.

Rare and precious pieces offer a complete overview of the history and artistry of the Venetian and lagoon's laces, from its origins to the present day are on display, in a picturesque setting decorated in the typical colors of the island.

Re-opened to the public in June 2011 after extensive restoration works, the Lace Museum offers a complete overview of the laces of Venice and islands and is one of the 11 civic museums managed by the Fondazione Musei Civici di Venezia.
