= Regole of Ampezzo Ethnographic Museum =

Regole of Ampezzo Ethnographic Museum is an ethnographic museum in Cortina d'Ampezzo, Italy. It is one of three museums administered by Le Regole d'Ampezzo, the other two being the Mario Rimoldi Modern Art Museum and the Rinaldo Zardini Palaeontology Museum. It is situated in the renovated and redesigned sawmill of Pontechiesa covering two floors and a basement, which includes a classroom. The space was designed by Studio Gellner, 2006–2011, with lighting design by iGuzzini.
