= Palazzo Foscari =

Palazzo Foscari can refer to:

- Ca' Foscari University of Venice, a university in Venice, Italy
- Ca' Foscari, a Gothic-style palace in the sestiere of Dorsoduro
- Palazzo Foscari (Giudecca 795), a Gothic-style palace on the Giudecca island, Venice, Italy
- Palazzo Foscari Contarini, a Renaissance-style palace in the sestiere of Santa Croce, Venice, Italy
- Palazzo Foscari del Prà, a Gothic-style palace in the sestiere of Cannaregio, Venice, Italy
