= Fondazione Musei Civici di Venezia =

- Formation: March 3, 2008
- Type: Museums
- Purpose: Heritage conservation and exhibition
- Headquarters: Piazza San Marco, 52 – 30124 Venice, Italy
- Coordinates: 45°26′01″N 12°20′19″E
- Region served: Italy
- Official language: Italian
- President: Mariacristina Gribaudi
- Website: www.visitmuve.it/en

Founded following the resolution passed by the Municipal Council Board of Venice on March 3, 2008, the Fondazione Musei Civici di Venezia (MUVE) manages and develops the cultural and artistic heritage of Venice and islands. Formed as a participatory foundation, it has only one founding member, the City of Venice.

== Museums ==
- Doge's Palace
- Museo Correr
- Clock Tower
- Ca' Rezzonico
- Palazzo Mocenigo Museum
- Carlo Goldoni's House
- Ca' Pesaro
- Palazzo Fortuny
- Glass Museum
- Lace Museum
- Natural History Museum
