= Francesco da Milano (painter) =

Italian painter

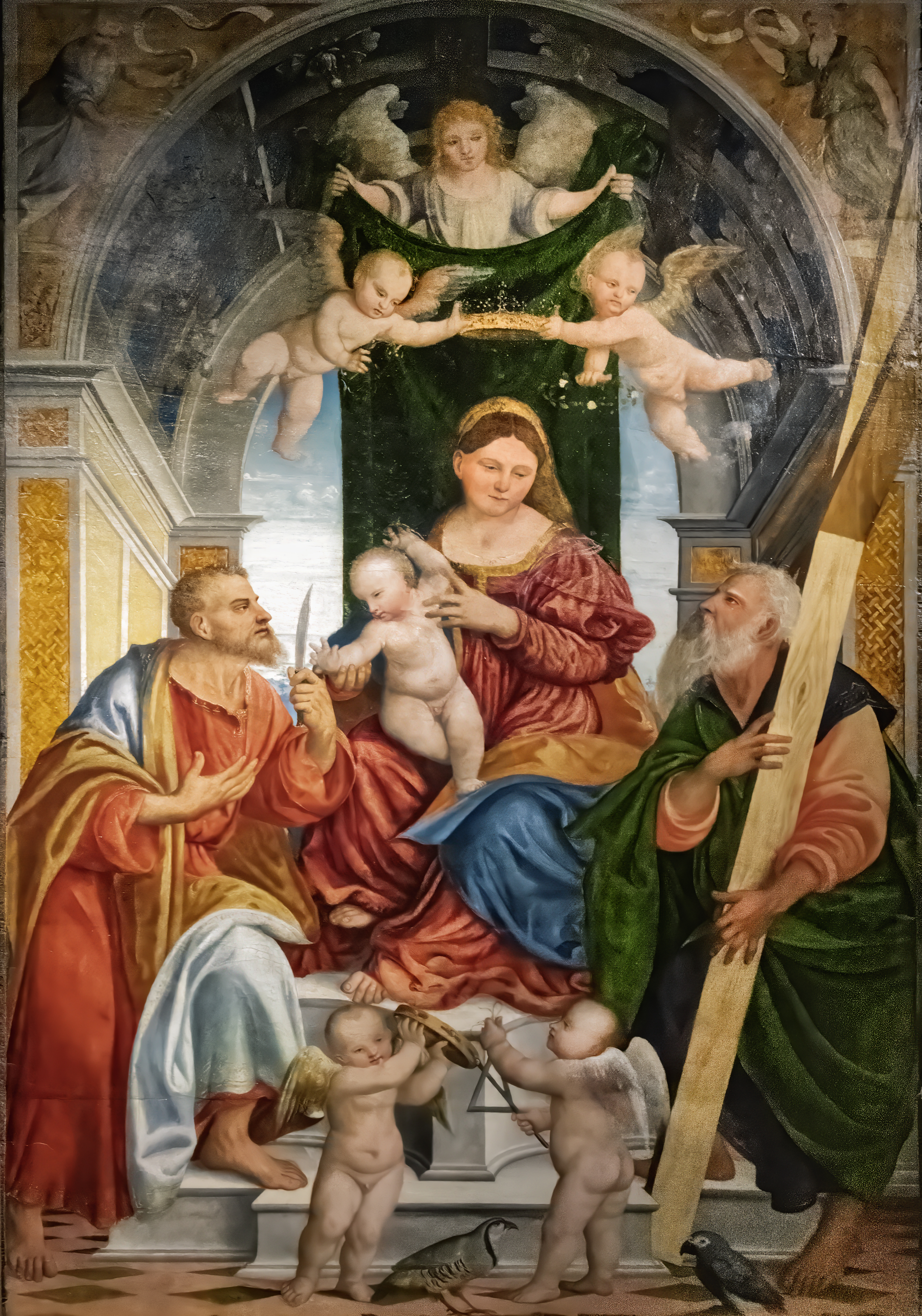
Madonna on the throne with the Child between St. Andrew and St. Bartholomew in Treviso

Francesco da Milano (born Francesco Pagani) was an Italian painter from Lombardy. He was active between 1502 and 1548 and twenty of his works in oil-on-canvas and fresco survive in the hill-country of Treviso and Friuli, including a fresco cycle at Castello Roganzuolo. As a Lombard, some aspects of his style were influenced by Bernardo Zenale and Vincenzo Civerchio, though he was also influenced by Titian, who like him lived and worked in the "contrada de Piai" in Serravalle. Titian was preferred to Francesco by Serravalle's town council – Francesco had been the initial choice to paint the Serravalle Altarpiece.
