= Villa Foscarini Rossi a Stra =

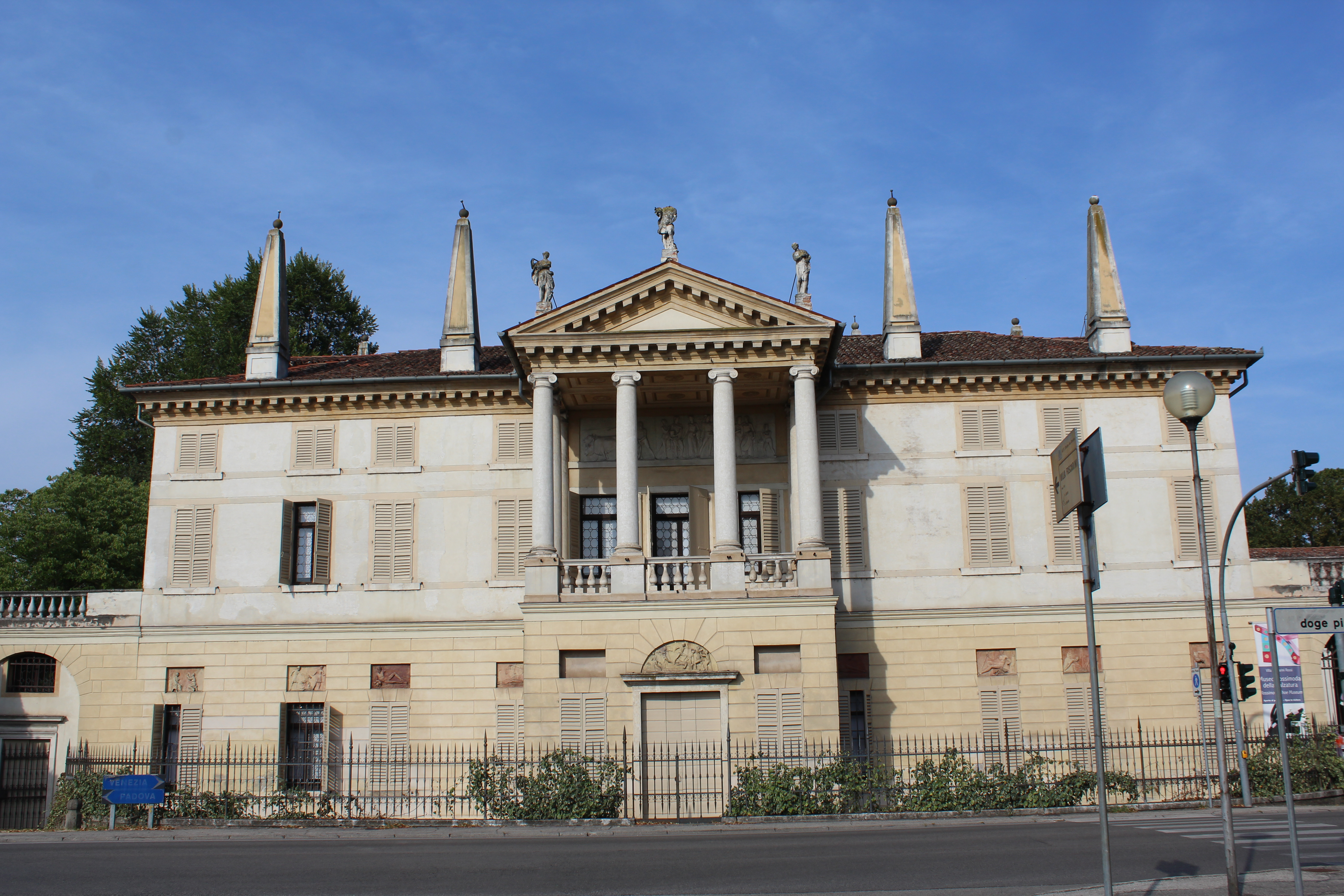
Villa Foscarini Rossi

Villa Foscarini Rossi is a Baroque-style aristocratic rural palace located at Via Doge Pisani 1/2, along the Riviera del Brenta, at Stra on the mainland of the Veneto, northern Italy. The Villa now houses a museum of shoes (Museo Rossimoda della Calzatura).

== History ==
Construction was begun in 1602, commissioned by the Venetian admiral Jacopo Foscarini. An additional block was built later, called the Foresteria, to house visiting guests. The house is notable for the frescoes in the main salon, painted in 1652 by Domenico de’ Bruni and Pietro Liberi to celebrate the wedding (a year before) of Giambattista Foscarini and Chiara Soranzo. With the fall of the Venetian republic, the villa was sold to various owners. In the 19th century, the shoe manufacturer, Luigino Rossi, pursued a refurbishment. In 1995, the complex was open to visitors. The main building houses the Museo della Calzatura, while the Foresteria is used for cultural events and meetings.

== See also ==
- Palladian villas of the Veneto
- Riviera del Brenta
