= Castello Roganzuolo =

- Frazione
- Location of Castello Roganzuolo in Italy
- Coordinates: 45°55′N 12°20′E
- Country: Italy
- Region: Veneto
- Province: Province of Treviso (TV)
- Comune: San Fior
- Elevation: 119 m (390 ft)

Population (2001)
  - Total: 235
- Demonym: Roganzuolani
- Time zone: UTC+1 (CET)
  - Summer (DST): UTC+2 (CEST)
- Dialing code: 0438
- Patron saint: Peter and Paul
- Saint day: 29 June

Castello Roganzuolo (Castél in Venetian language) is a frazione of San Fior comune (municipality) in the Province of Treviso in the Italian region Veneto, located on Conegliano hills (famous for productions of wine, especially prosecco) about 50 km north of Venice and about 30 km northeast of Treviso.

== SS. Peter and Paul Church ==
In this place Titian worked and lived, during the Renaissance, painting a triptych for SS. Peter and Paul Church. Also Pomponio Amalteo, 15th century painter, and Sante Cancian, 20th century painter, worked in Castello Roganzuolo.

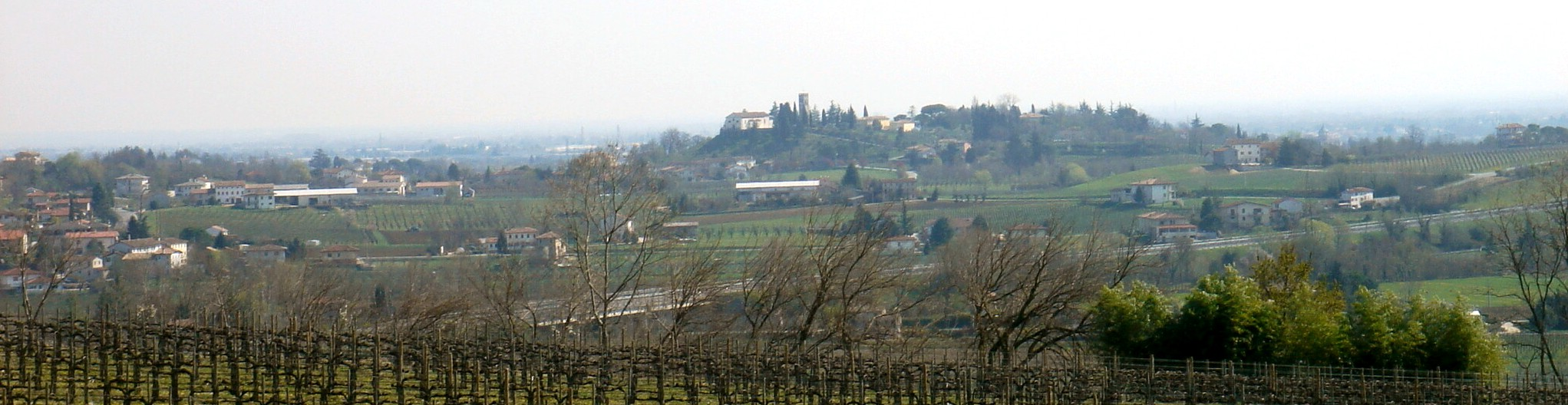
A panoramic view of Castello Roganzuolo from Ogliano, frazione of Conegliano

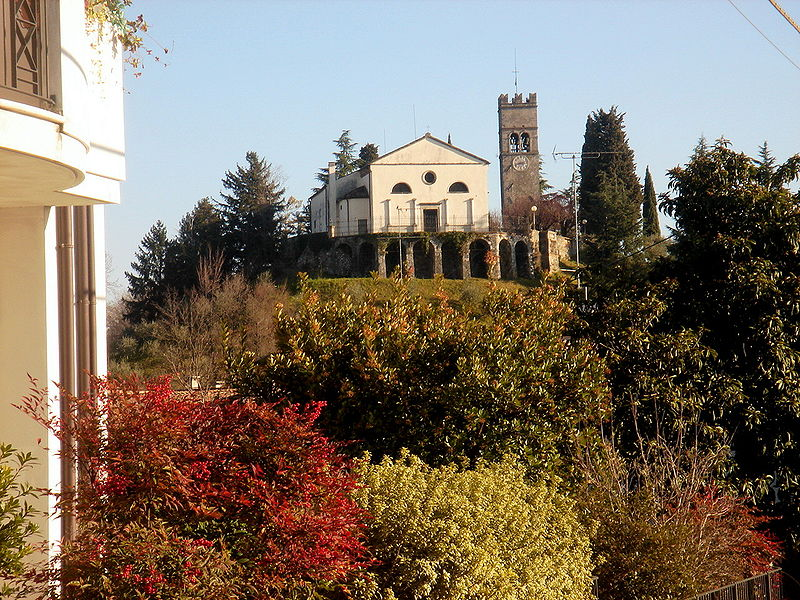
Monumental Church of SS. Peter and Paul

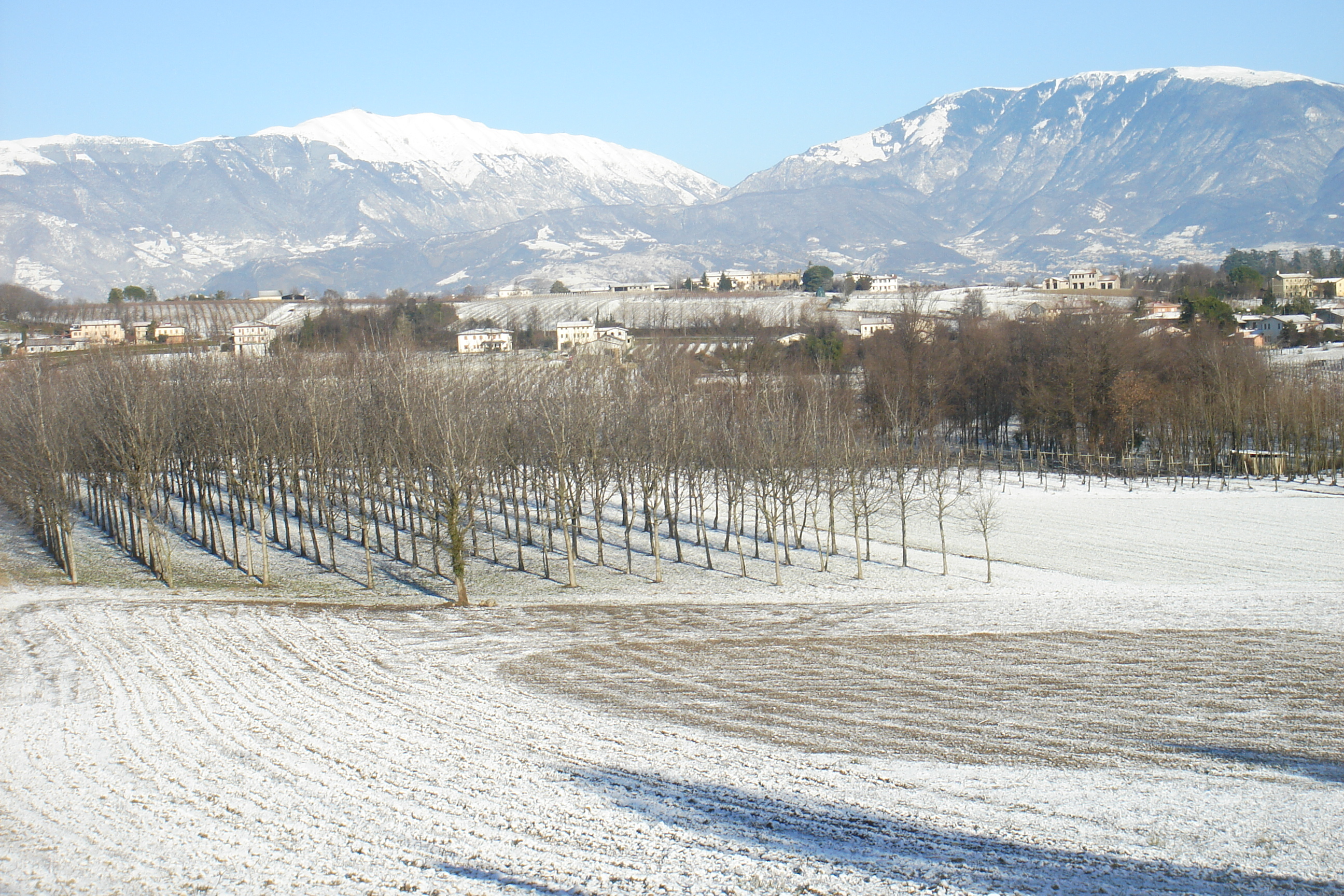
Winter view

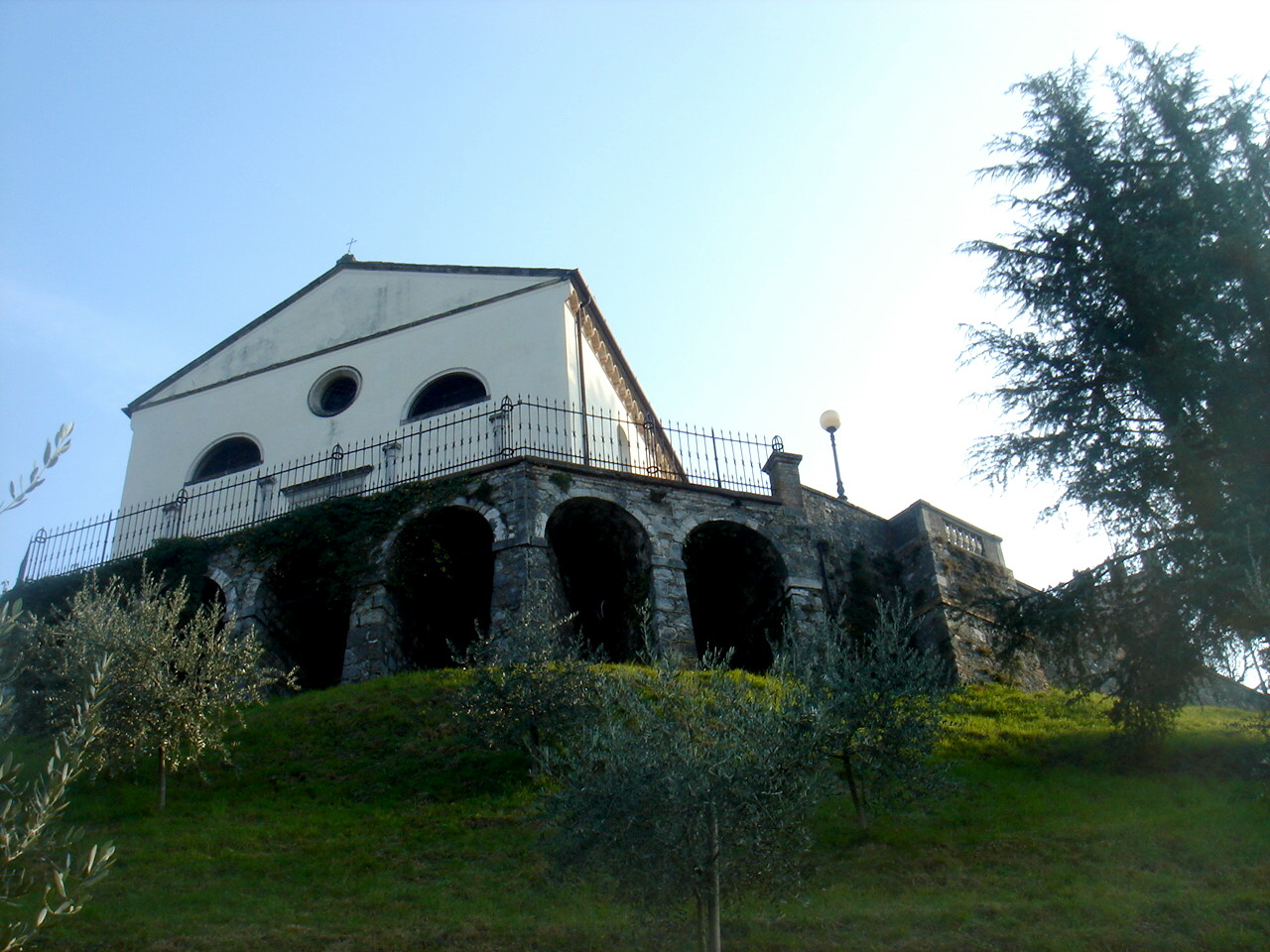
The church

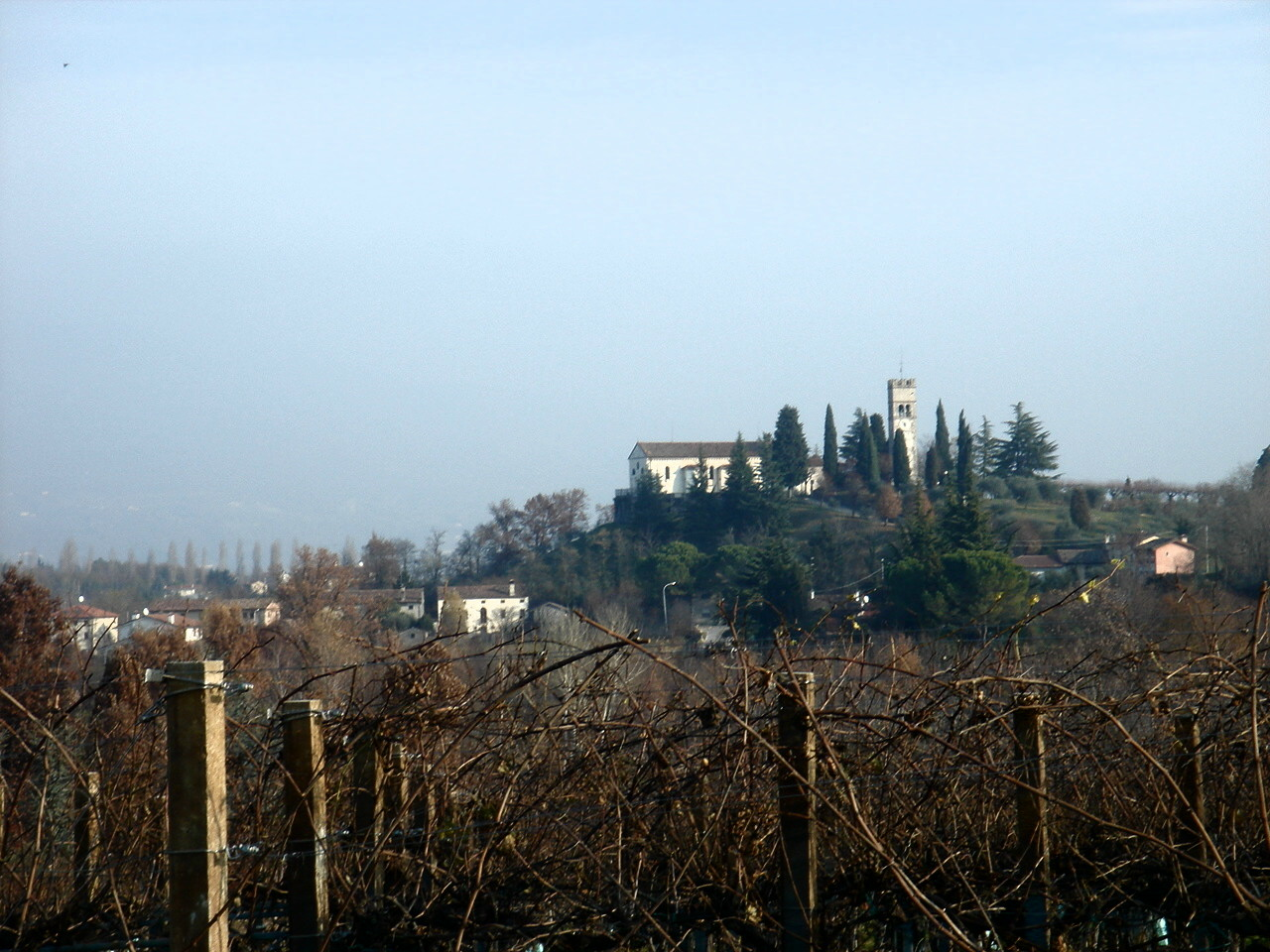
Autumn view

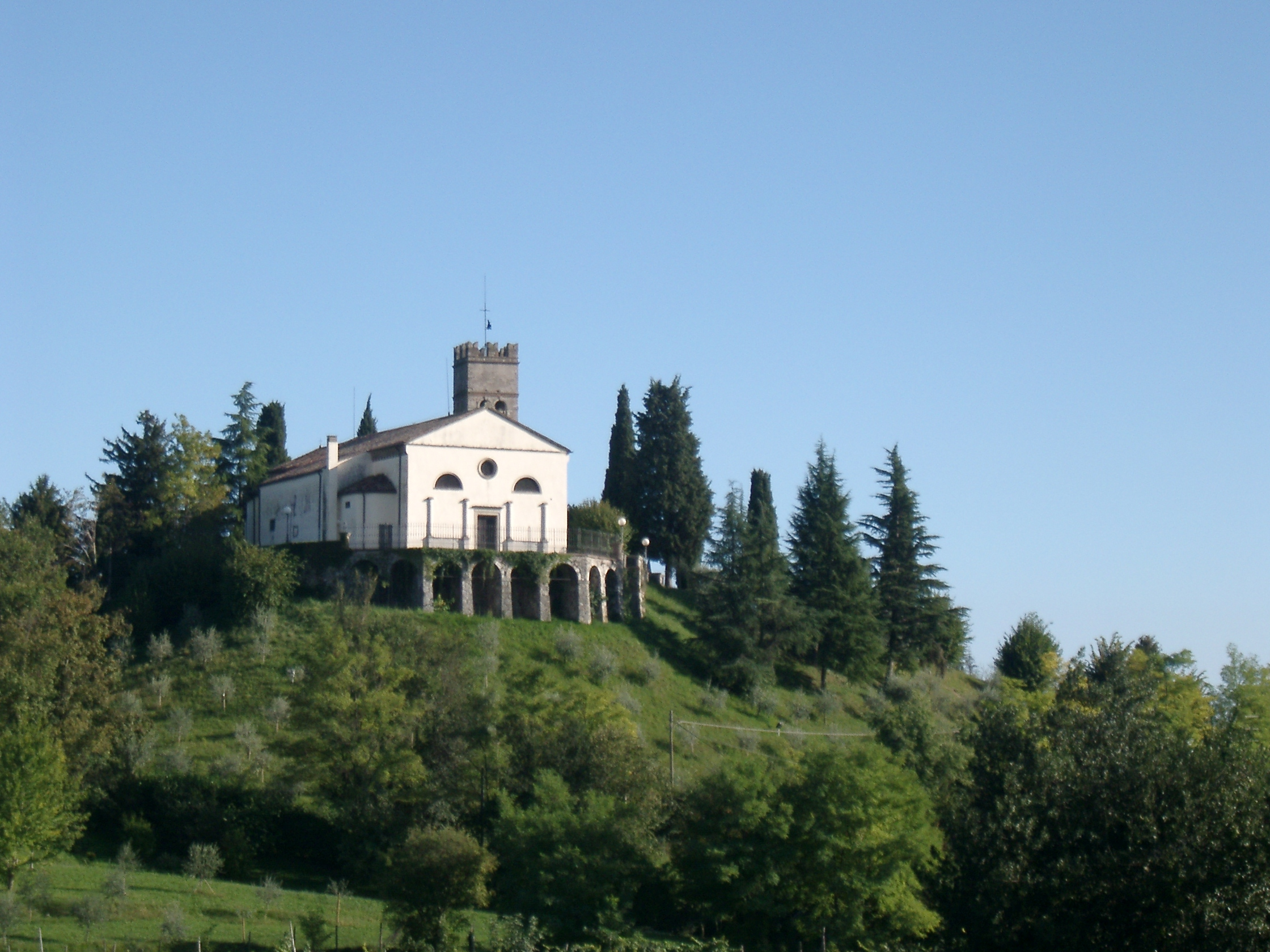
Spring view

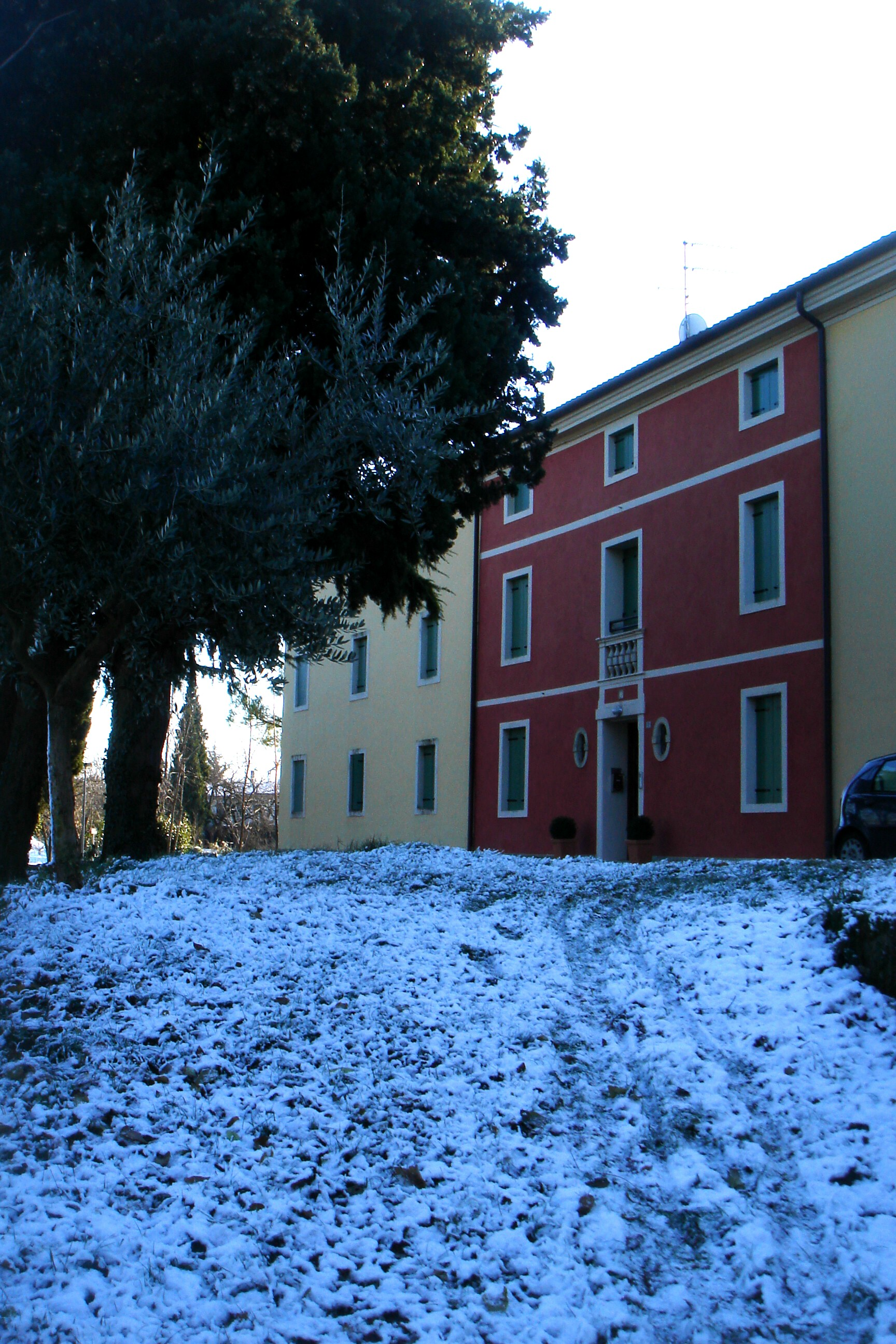
Canonica

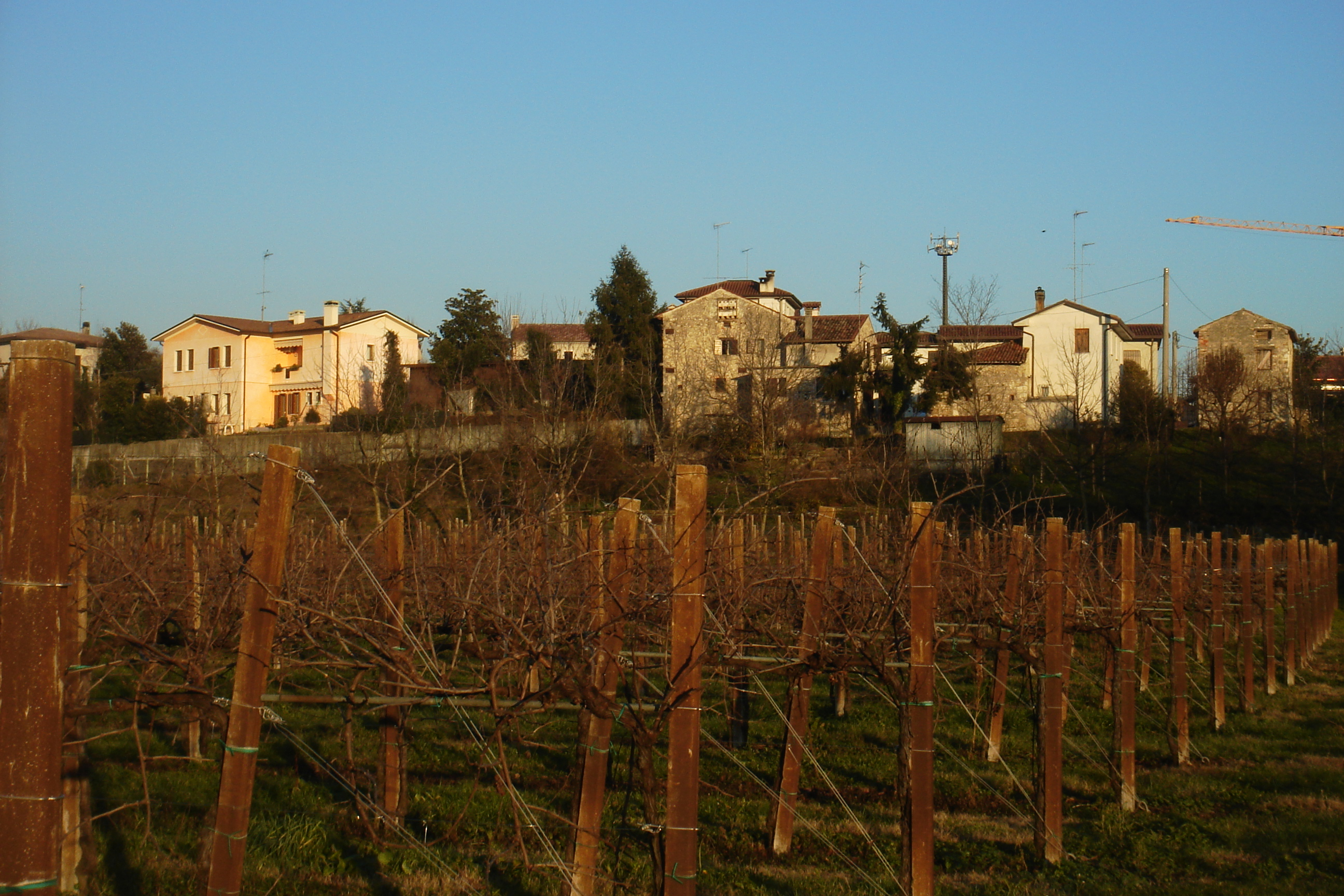
Borgo Generai

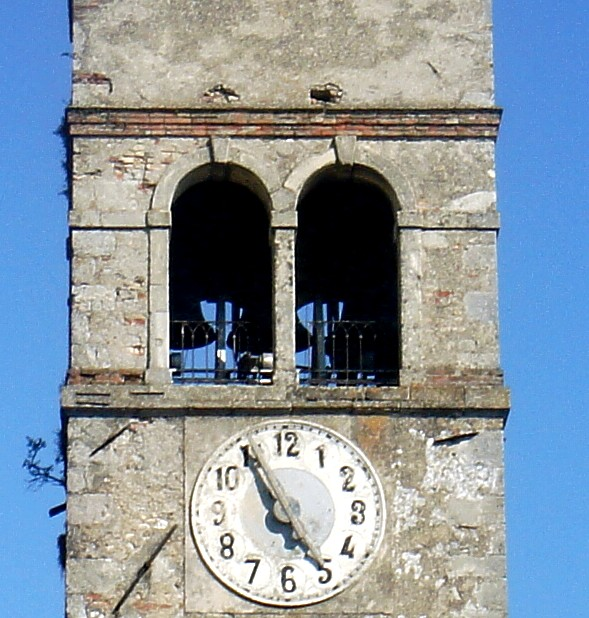
The campanile
