= Kingdom of Fanes =

Ladin national epic

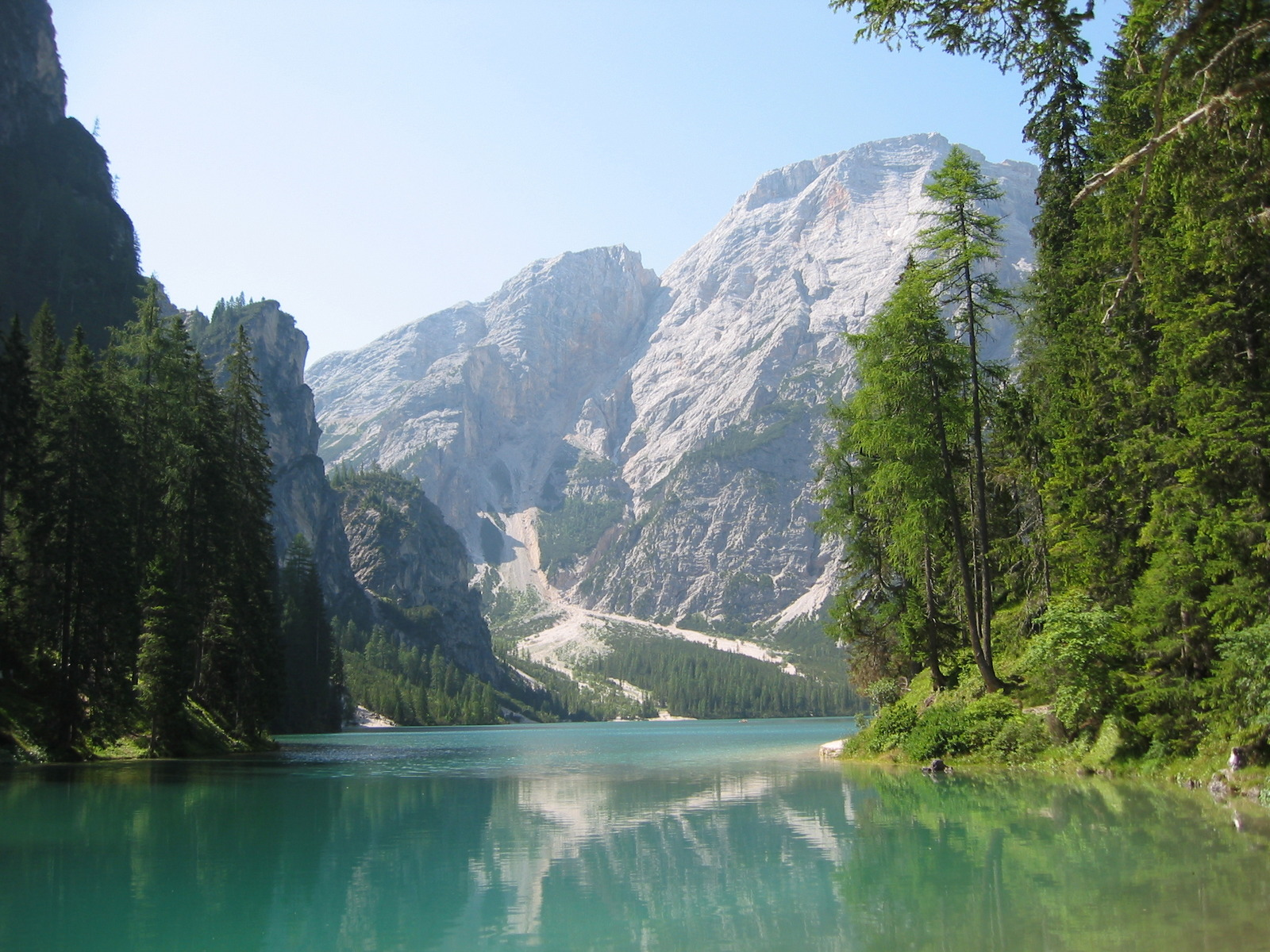
View of Lake Braies and the Seekofel (Ladin Sass dla porta) behind. According to the legend, the Fanes, survivors of the battle against the southern people would live inside the mountain, waiting for the rebirth of their kingdom. It is an example of the King asleep in mountain folklore motif

The Kingdom of Fanes (Ladin: Rëgn de Fanes) is the national epic of the Ladin people in the Dolomites and the most important part of the Ladin literature. Originally an epic cycle, today it is known through the work of Karl Felix Wolff in 1932, gathered in his book Dolomitensagen. Until that time, this material was transmitted orally among the Ladin people. This legend is part of the larger corpus of the South Tyrolean sagas, whose protagonists are the Fanes themselves.

== Synopsis ==
Initially, the Fanes lived in peace and allied themselves with the peaceful marmots. Some generations later, the queen decided to marry a foreign prince, who took control of the kingdom and replaced the marmot in the emblem of the Fanes with an eagle, allied himself with the eagles and prepared to wage war to expand the kingdom. He made his daughter Dolasilla a fierce fighter. Dolasilla received an impenetrable silver armour and unfailing arrows from the dwarves, after she helped them. The dwarves tell her she will be invincible until marriage and advise her not to enter the battlefield should the silver armour change colour. Under Dolasilla's command, invincible on the battlefield, the kingdom grows in size, until she meets a servant of the sorcerer Spina de Mul, the enemy warrior Ey de Net, and falls in love with him. Due to the dwarves' prophecy, the king opposes the marriage. Dolasilla and Ey de Net pledged not to fight ever again. Foreseeing the end of his kingdom, the king banishes Ey de Net and bargained his people and kingdom for the entrance to the legendary underground land of plenty, Aurona with the enemy kingdom of the southern people and flees. To defend her people. Dolasilla broke her oath and joined the battle, even though her armour is turning dark. She dies fighting, killed by her unfailing arrows, which Spina de Mul stole from her. The traitor king is turned into stone and the survivors of the Fanes find shelter with the marmots in the mountain, where they wait for the silver trumpets that will mark the rebirth of the kingdom.

== The Kingdom of Fanes according to Wolff ==
=== Wolff's view ===
The preservation of such material about Ladin legends is due mainly to Karl Felix Wolff, Austrian journalist and anthropologist. His passion for folklore and the oral traditions of the people of the Dolomites started during his stay in Fiemme Valley. Then Wolff dedicated his time to the purpose of gathering these oral traditions. He was convinced these stories were distinct and distant from the Romance and Germanic lore most stories in the Alps came from. The motifs of these stories led him to think they came from more ancient times, due to the presence of totemism, the anthropomorphisms for the sun, the moon and death and an underlying conflict between patriarchal and matrilinear societies. The reconstruction of the epic cycle took a long time, between 1907 and 1932.

=== Wolff's errors ===
Since the material was very fragmented, Wolff stated he had to make additions some rework so to produce a complete text. However, he was not very precise at stating which parts of his work were his own. Ulrike Kindl, germanologist at the University of Venice, analysed Wolff's method and the sagas extensively, in order to backtrack to the original material. According to her work, Wolff's book could be separated in three different parts, initially independent: a corpus of stories from the Val Badia and Cortina d'Ampezzo revolving around the character of Dolasilla and the Fanes, a Fodom one about Aurona, the underground land of plenty, and Lidsanel's saga from Fassa Valley.

== Mentioned places and underlying events ==
The dating of the cycle is uncertain, likely from a pre-Roman period. Some themes suggested Wolff, Kindl and various scholars that the original story may date back to the beginning of the Iron Age, around 900 BCE.

Following such dating, if the story were to be somewhat based on historical events, the southern people the Fanes are at war with might be, then, the Palaeo-Venetics.

Initially such dating was supposed implausible, as it was believed that humans did not populate the dolomitic valleys until Roman times, but such hypothesis was proved wrong by various archaeological discoveries, like the Mesolithic burial in Mondeval (San Vito di Cadore).

The events take place mostly on the Fanes plateau. Some of the mentioned places are Plan de Corones, lake Braies, the Averau, the Falzarego Pass.

== Legacy ==
When Wolff started to gather these oral stories, the available material was scarce and almost forgotten. However his work stimulated a rebirth in the interest towards this legend and Alpine folklore in general. After Wolff, many other versions of these stories followed, like those of Staudacher and Angel Morlang or the re-elaborated version of Brunamaria Dal Lago. In 2005, from the idea of Susy Rottonara, Roland Verra and Hans-Peter Karbon produced a film about the saga produced, titled “Le Rëgn de Fanes”, which won Best International Score prize at Garden State Film Festival in 2008. The legacy of the legend could also be found in the various shops, hotels and commercial activities named after the characters or the events of the story.

== Sources ==
- (in Italian) Bruna Dal Lago Veneri, Storie di magia. Errabonda cultura lunare fra le custodi del tempo promesso nelle valli ladine, con una prefazione di Luigi Granetto, Lato Side, 1979.
- (in Italian) Giuliano Palmieri e Marco Palmieri, I regni perduti dei monti pallidi. Cierre Edizioni, 1996 Verona.
- (in German) Ulrike Kindl, Kritische Lektüre der Dolomitensagen von Karl Felix Wolff, Bd. I. Istitut Ladin Micura de Rü, 1983, San Martin de Tor.
- (in German) Ulrike Kindl, Kritische Lektüre der Dolomitensagen von Karl Felix Wolff, Bd. II. Istitut Ladin Micura de Rü, 1983, San Martin de Tor.
- (in German) Karl Felix Wolff, Dolomitensagen, Selbstverlag, 1913, Bolzano.
- (in Italian) Karl Felix Wolff, Il regno dei Fanes, Cappelli, 1951, Bologna.
- (in German) Karl Staudacher, Das Fanneslied, Ed. Tyrolia, 1994 (1937), Innsbruck.
- (in Ladin) Angel Morlang, Fanes da Zacan, Istitut ladin Micurá de Rü, 1978, San Martin de Tor.
- (in Italian) Bruna Dal Lago Veneri, Elmar Locher, Leggende e racconti del Trentino-Alto Adige: vagabonde fantasie, miti e incantesimi erranti tra valli, boschi e castelli misteriosi; un intreccio affascinante e sorprendente di storie a cavallo tra due culture di antichissima tradizione, Roma: Newton Compton, 1983.
- (in Italian) Bruna Dal Lago Veneri, Il regno dei Fanes, Giunti 2008

== See also ==
- Parco naturale Fanes - Sennes e Braies
