= Ampezzo Dolomites Natural Park =

Nature reserve in Veneto, Italy

Parco naturale delle Dolomiti d'Ampezzo
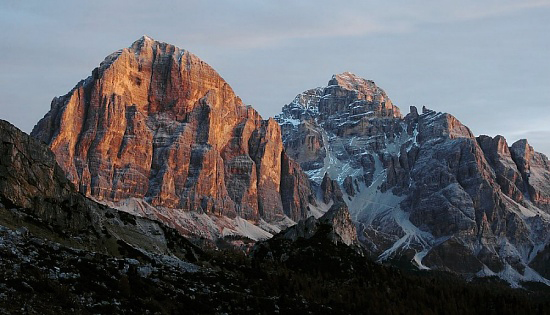
- Interactive map of Parco naturale delle Dolomiti d'Ampezzo
- Location: Veneto, Italy
- Coordinates: 46°37′N 12°06′E
- Area: 11,200 hectares
- Established: 1990
- Website: www.dolomitiparco.com

The Ampezzo Dolomites Natural Park (Italian: Parco naturale delle Dolomiti d'Ampezzo) is a nature reserve in Veneto, Italy. Established in 1990, it is entirely located in the territory of Cortina d’Ampezzo, in the Province of Belluno, and encompasses some of the most famous Dolomitic groups, such as the Tofane, Monte Cristallo, the Croda Rossa d'Ampezzo, Lagazuoi, Pomagagnon and Col Bechei. Together with the adjacent Naturpark Fanes-Sennes-Prags in the Province of Bolzano, it forms a protected area of 37,000 hectares in the heart of the Dolomites. The park has been designated as a Site of Community Importance, and about one quarter of its territory is afforded further protection through twenty smaller reserves.

The flora includes 68 species of trees and shrubs, 32 species of ferns and over 1,000 species of flowers, including 35 species of orchids. At lower elevations, tree species include European beeches and European yews, whereas between 1,300 and 1,900 metres the sides of the valleys are covered with forests of Norway spruces. Silver firs and Scots pines are also present; at higher elevations they are replaced by larches and Swiss pines, then by mountain pines, and finally by grasslands.

The fauna includes 31 species of mammals, 113 species of birds and 16 species of amphibians, reptiles and fish. Mammals include red deer, roe deer, chamois (the most widespread large mammal in the park, with about 1,500 specimens), Alpine ibexes (reintroduced in the early 2000s and now numbering between 50 and 100 specimens), foxes, marmots, squirrels, European hares, mountain hares, European badgers, stoats, beech martens, and European pine martens. Predators such as the brown bear, the European lynx and the golden jackal, long extinct in the region, have recently started to move back in from other Alpine areas where they have been preserved or reintroduced.

Bird species include Western capercaillie, black grouse, rock ptarmigan, hazel grouse, Eurasian eagle-owls, golden eagles, Tengmalm's owls, Eurasian pygmy owls, Eurasian goshawks, black woodpeckers, great spotted woodpeckers, Eurasian hoopoes, bearded vultures, wallcreepers, Eurasian crag martins, and the rare Eurasian three-toed woodpeckers. Snakes include the horned viper and the European asp, and fish include River trout and Arctic char.

Two visitor centres and eleven mountain huts are located in the park, which is crossed by over 300 kilometres of hiking paths, including eight vie ferrate.
