= Fanis =

Mountain in Italy

- German: Mittlere Fanesspitze
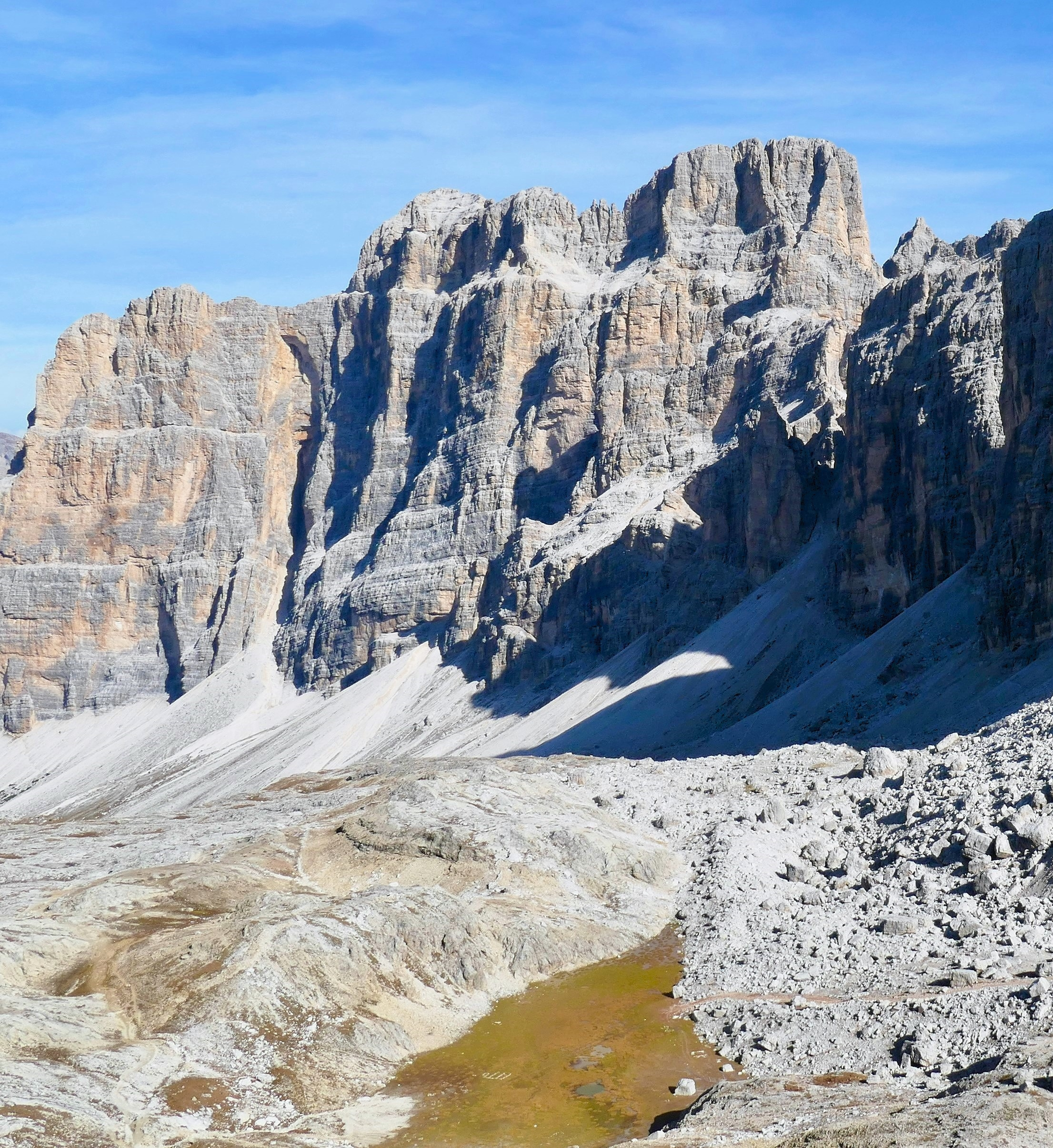
- Southwest aspect

Highest point
- Elevation: 2,989 m (9,806 ft)
- Prominence: 674 m (2,211 ft)
- Parent peak: Tofana di Mezzo
- Isolation: 3.22 km (2.00 mi)
- Coordinates: 46°33′05″N 12°00′51″E

Naming
- Etymology: Kingdom of Fanes

Geography
- Location within Italy
- Interactive map of Fanis
- Country: Italy
- Province: South Tyrol / Belluno
- Protected area: Ampezzo Dolomites Natural Park / Fanes-Sennes-Prags Nature Park
- Parent range: Dolomites; Fanes Group
- Topo map: Tabacco 03 Cortina d’Ampezzo e Dolomiti Ampezzane

Geology
- Rock age: Triassic
- Rock type: Dolomite

Climbing
- First ascent: 1898

Fanis is a mountain on the boundary shared by the provinces of South Tyrol and Belluno in northern Italy.

== Description ==
Fanis, also known as Mittlere Fanesspitze in German, is a 2,989-meter-elevation (9,806-foot) massif in the Fanes Group of the Dolomites, a UNESCO World Heritage Site. Set on the boundary shared by the Trentino-Alto Adige/Südtirol and Veneto regions, the mountain is located nine kilometers (5.6 miles) west of the town of Cortina d'Ampezzo, and the peak is situated on the common boundary that Ampezzo Dolomites Natural Park shares with Fanes-Sennes-Prags Nature Park. The highest summit of the massif is called Punta Di Mezzo (Middle Peak). The south peak rises to 2,980 meters, the north peak is 2,969 meters, and Torre Fanis (Fanis Tower) is 2,922 meters. Precipitation runoff from the west slope drains into tributaries of the Gran Ega, whereas the east slope drains into tributaries of the Boite. Topographic relief is significant as the summit rises 1,000 meters (3,280 feet) above the west slope in one kilometer (0.6 mile) and 1,000 meters above the east slope in less than two kilometers (1.2 miles). The Italian toponym derives from the Fanes Group subrange of the Dolomites, in turn named after the Kingdom of Fanes (Ladin: Rëgn de Fanes) which is the national epic of the Ladin people and the most important part of the Ladin literature. The nearest higher neighbor is Tofana di Rozes, 2.84 kilometers (1.76 miles) to the east-southeast.

== Climbing ==
The first ascent of the South Peak was made on July 19, 1897, by Josef Appenbichler and Victor Wolf von Glanvell. The first ascent of Torre Fanis was made on August 12, 1898, by Karl Günther von Saar and Victor Wolf von Glanvell. The first ascent of the Middle Peak is unknown, but it was climbed on August 13, 1898, by Karl Günther von Saar and Victor Wolf von Glanvell.

== Climate ==
Based on the Köppen climate classification, Fanis is located in an alpine climate zone with long, cold winters, and short, mild summers. Weather systems are forced upwards by the mountains (orographic lift), causing moisture to drop in the form of rain and snow. The months of June through September offer the most favorable weather for visiting or climbing in this area.

== Gallery ==
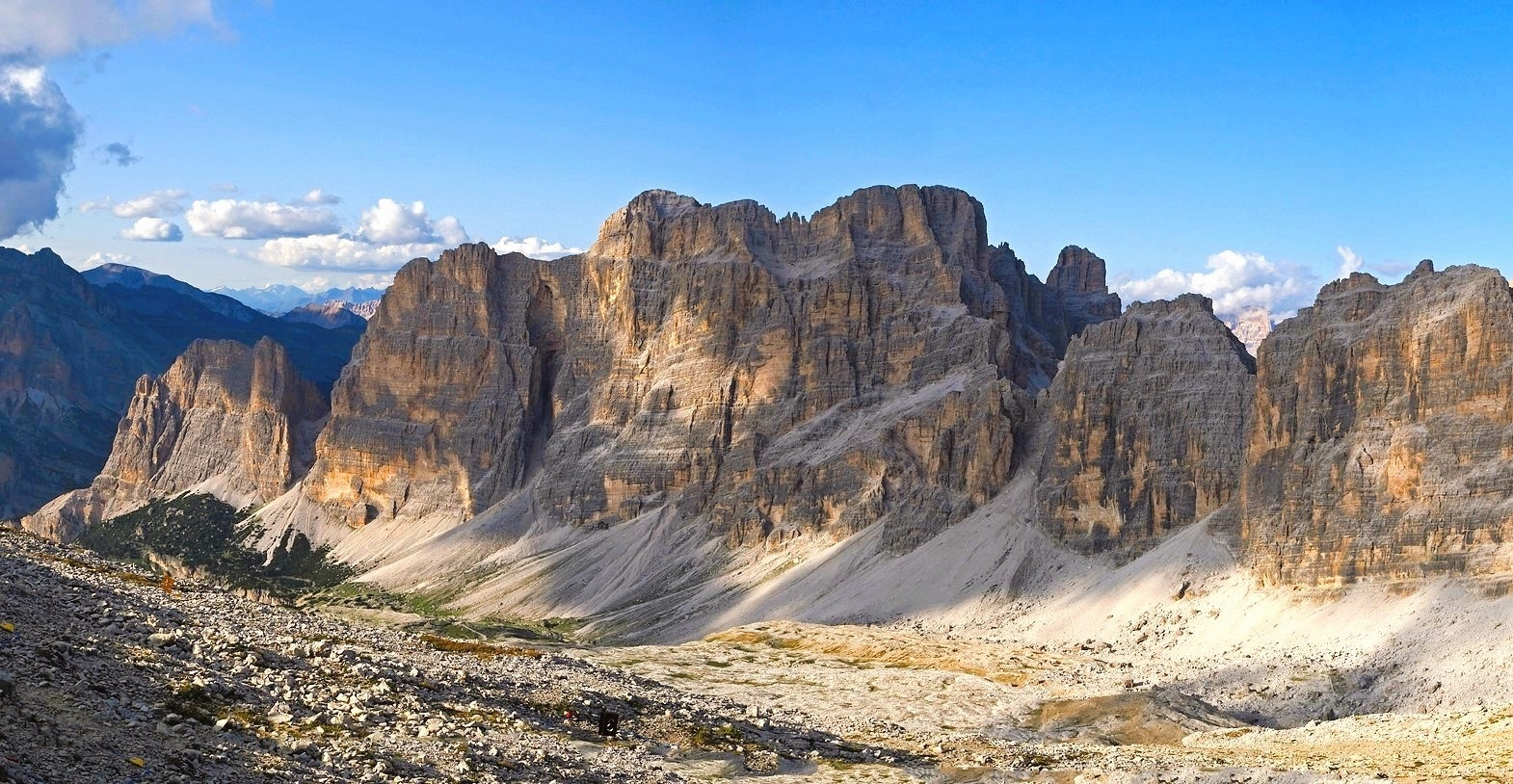
West aspect

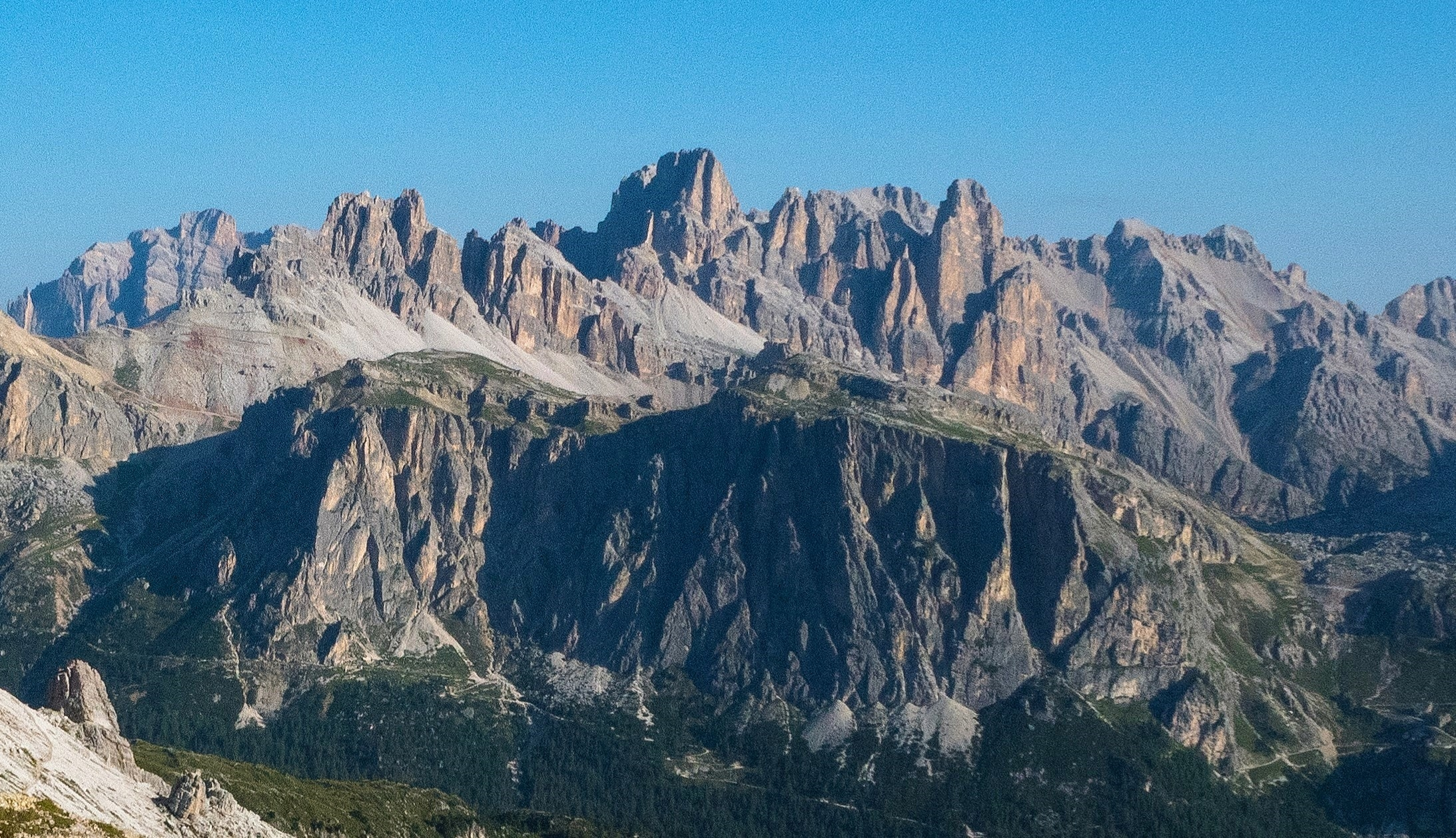
South-southeast aspect centered on skyline

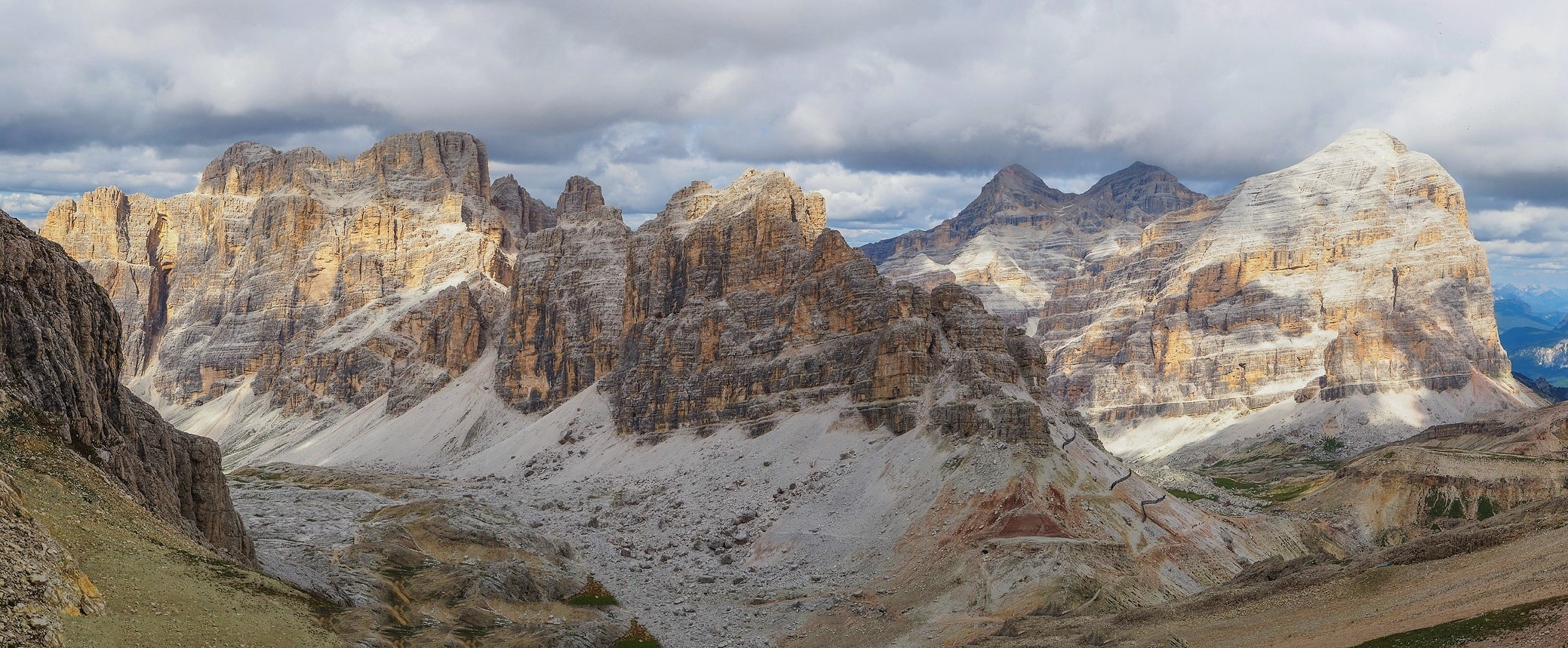
Fanis (left) and Tofane (right) viewed from west.

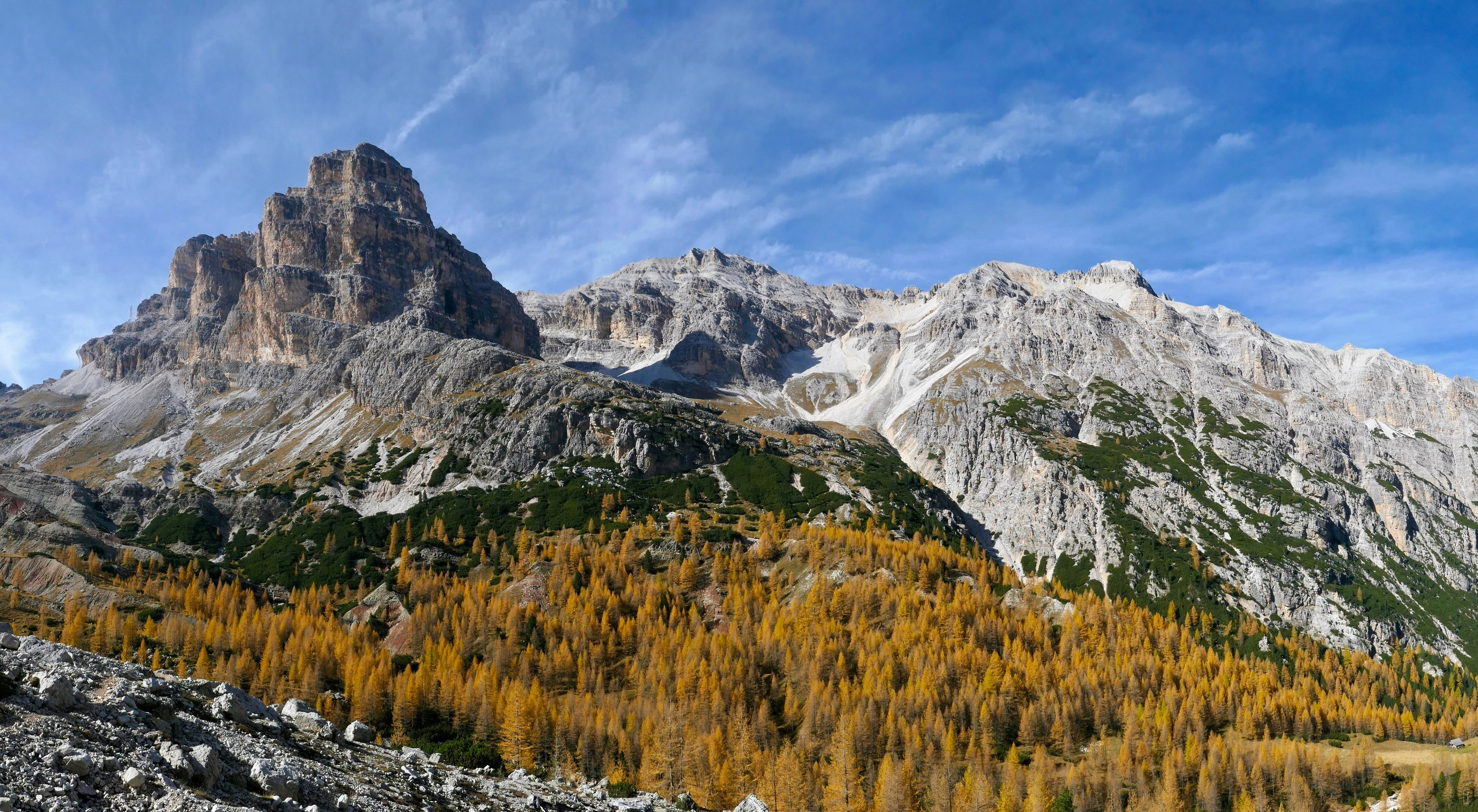
Torre Fanis (left) and the North Peak (center) from the east

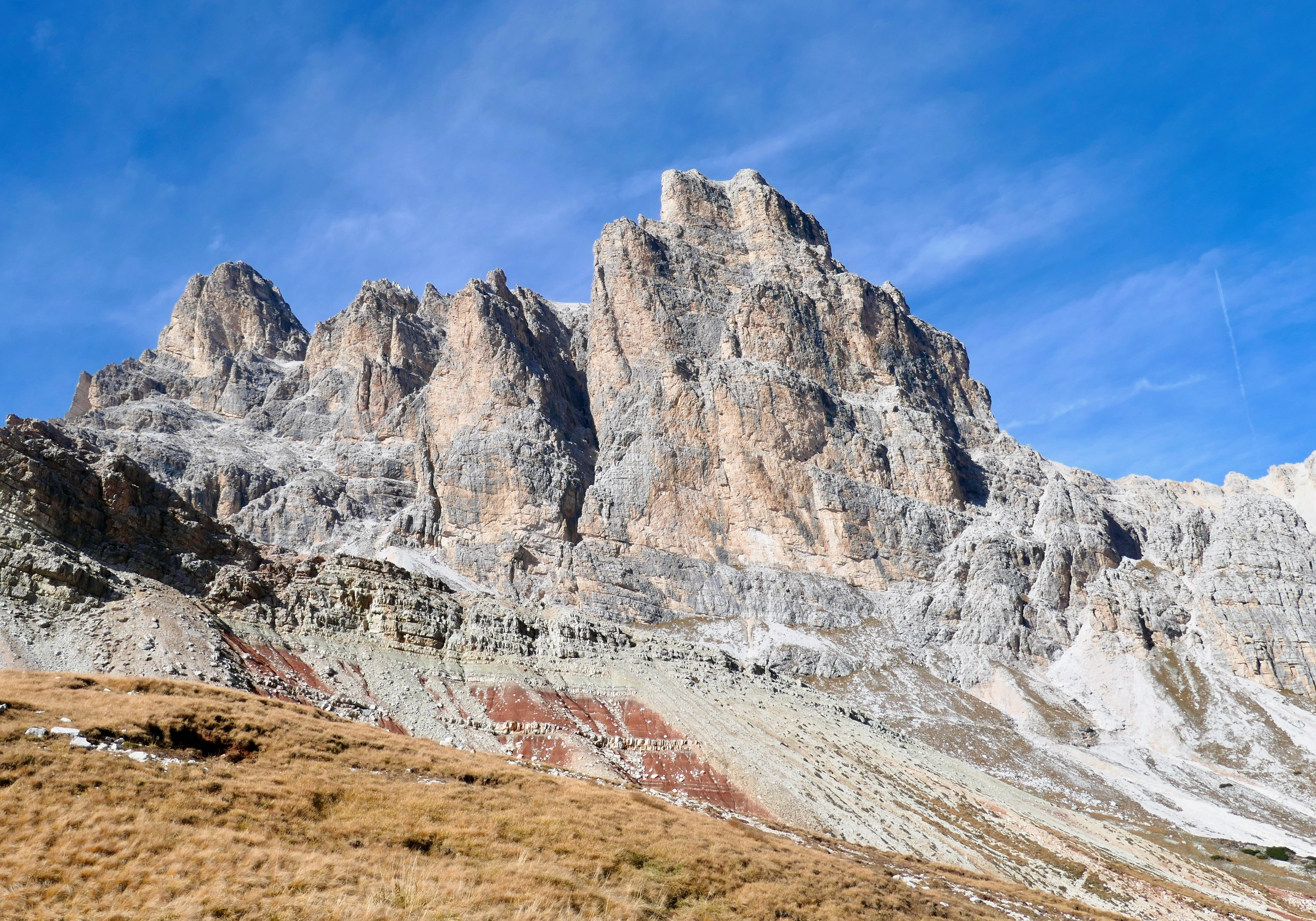
Southeast aspect of Torre Fanis

Piza dl Lech (2,654 m) and Piza Scotoni-Cima Scotoni (2,874 m) of the northwest ridge of Fanis

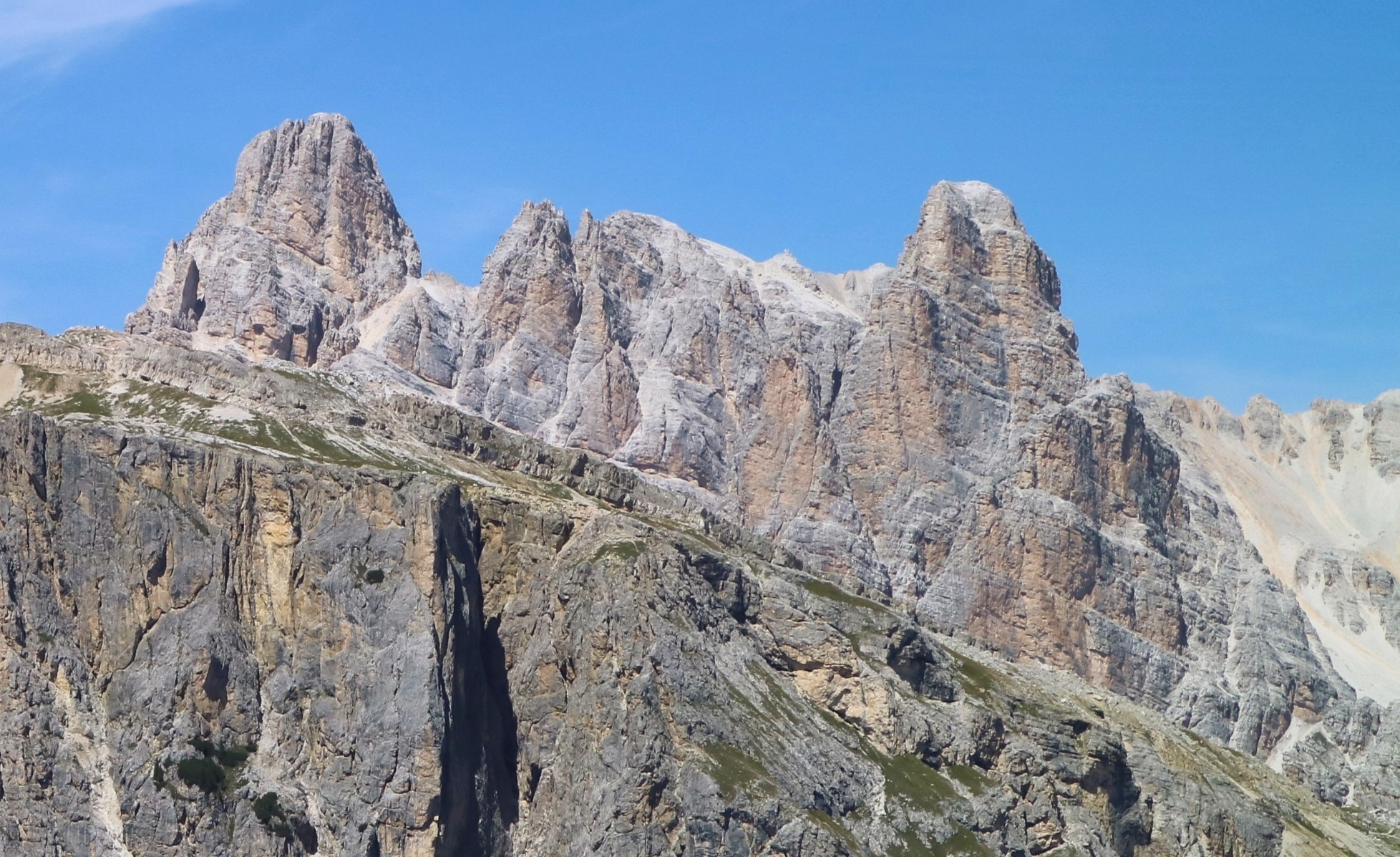
Fanis south peak (left) and Torre Fanis (right)

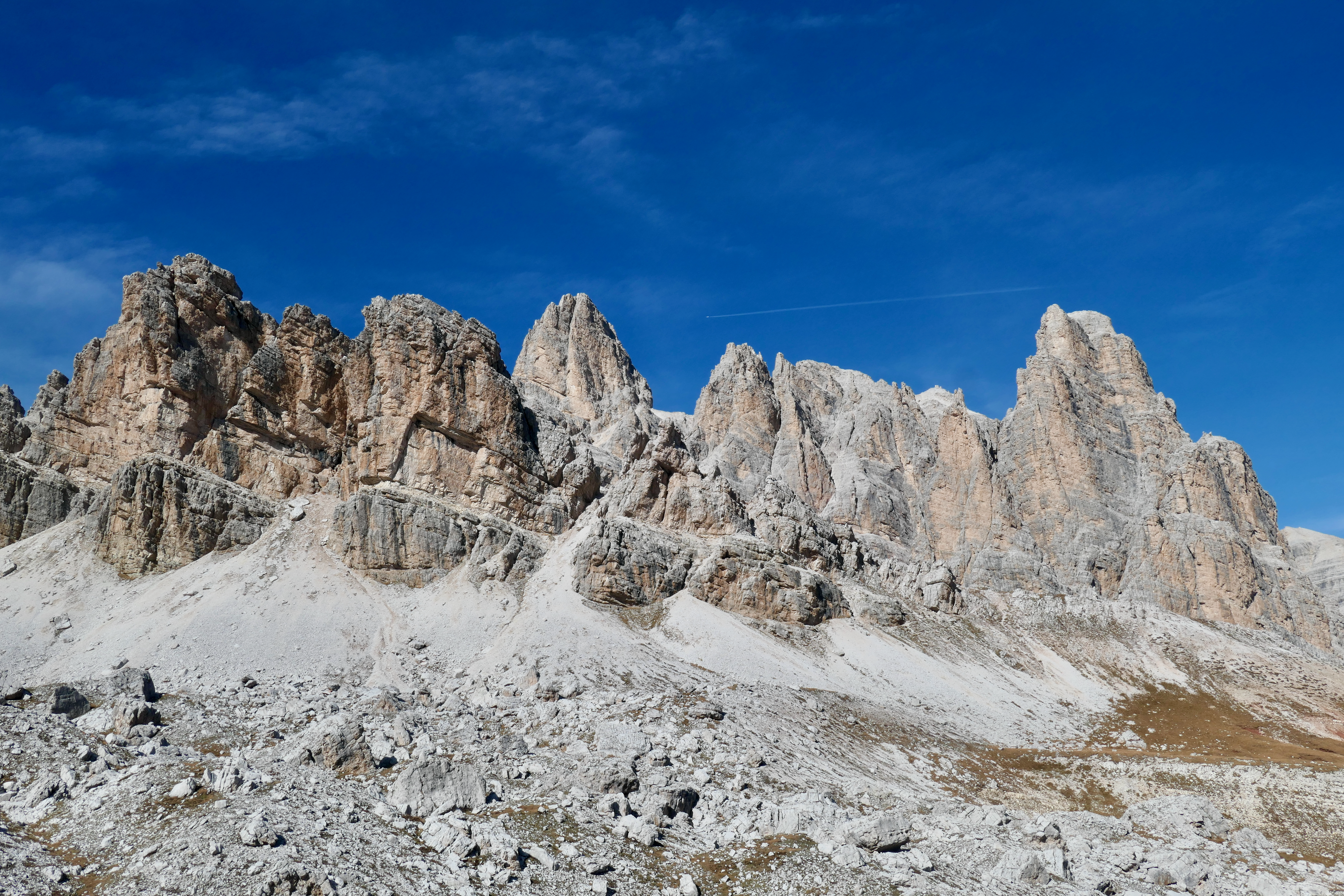
Fanis south peak (left of center) and Torre Fanis (right)

== See also ==
- Southern Limestone Alps
