= Valparola Pass =

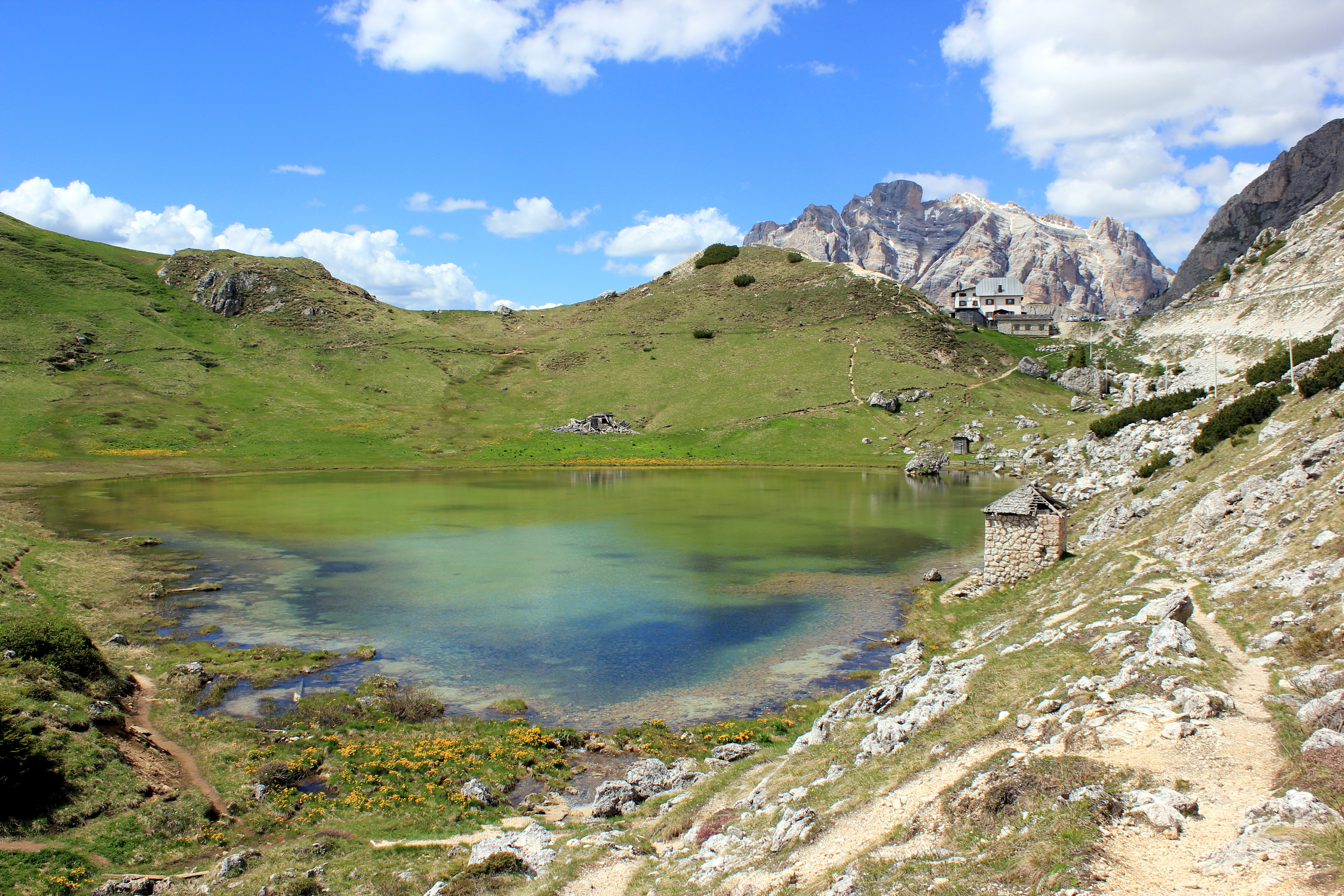
- Valparola Pass with hut and with Lake Valparola in the foreground. In the background Piz Cunturines. To the left of the lake is the Edelweiss position.

- Location within Alps
- Elevation: 2,168 metres (7,113 ft)

Third Approach
- Location: Belluno, Italy
- Coordinates: 46°32′36″N 11°58′25″E

The Valparola Pass (Italian: Passo di Valparola) (el. 2,168 m, in Ladin : "Ju de Valparola") is a high mountain pass in the Dolomites in the province of Belluno in Italy.

The pass lies a little west of Falzarego Pass. The hut "Rifugio Passo Valparola" (bar, restaurant) is located directly on the pass. From the pass there are numerous hiking trails as well as to the Col di Lana, the Lagazuoi (Kaiserjäger path), the Fanes Plateau and towards the Pralongia mountain inn. North of the pass in the east of the old pass road is the source (Italian: Fontana) Valparola.

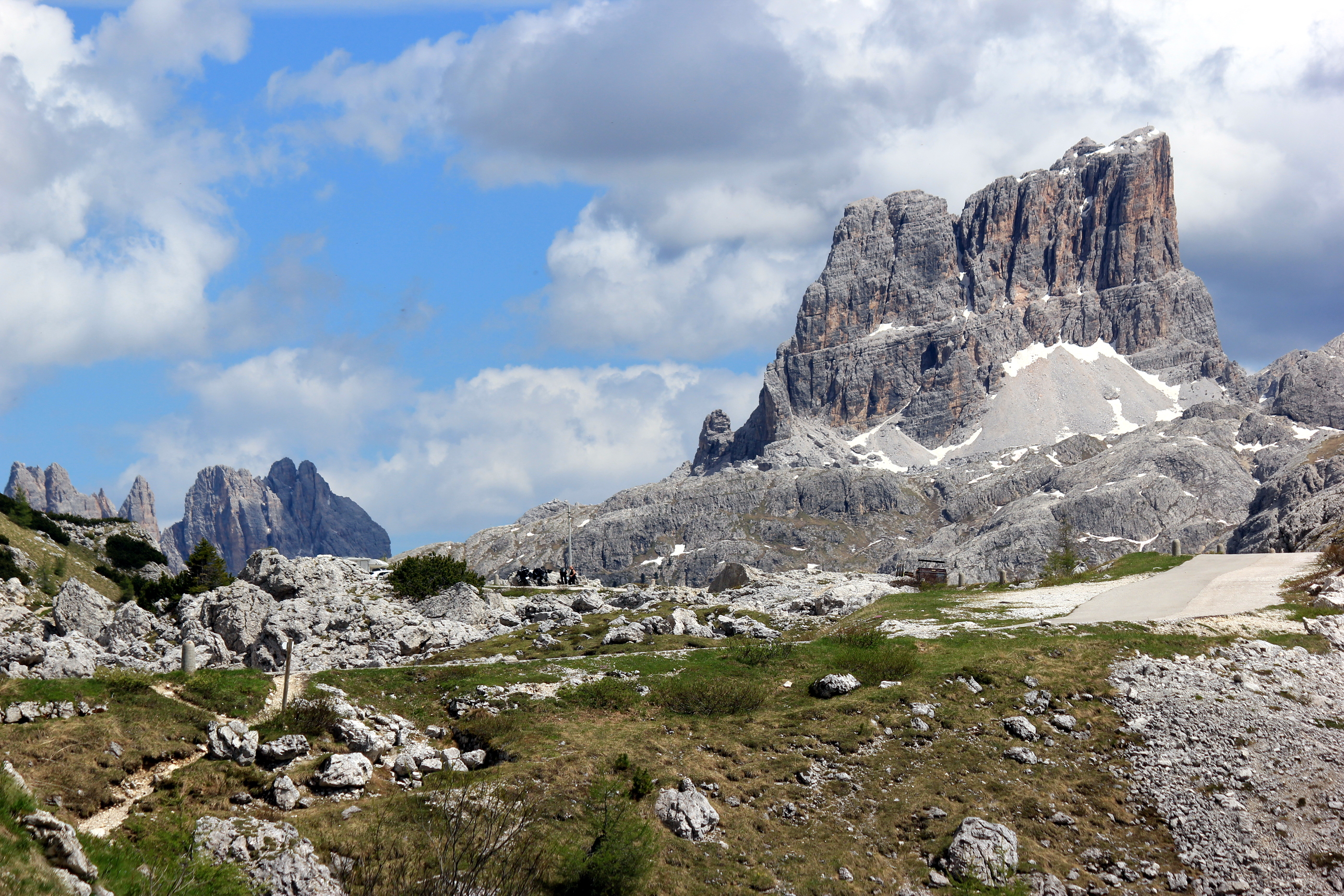
View to the east to the Monte Averau

The Valparola got its name from the ironworks that were once near the pass. Valparola is the Latin translation of the word iron furnace valley. Ruins of these ovens, which were still in use into the 16th century, are said to have been visible in 1860. Even the Stone Age people knew the pass, as has been proven by isolated finds at Lake Valparola. It can be assumed that the smelting of metal there also goes back at least to the Iron Age.

Before World War I, there was only a trail over the pass, but the area was heavily contended during the war. Between 1897 and 1900, the Austro-Hungarian army built the Forte Tre Sassi fortification on the top of the pass. In 1915, the fort was partially destroyed by Italian artillery attacks. Although the fortification could no longer be used afterwards, the Austrians continued to illuminate the fort to give the impression that it was still in operation. The fortress ruins have now been restored and now houses a museum. The Edelweiss position of the Austro-Hungarian army was located directly next to the Valparola Pass during World War I. These are the positions in the flat area, called Le Laste, on a 600 meter wide point between the Hexenstein (Italian: Sasso de Stria, 2,477m), which was heavily fortified during the war, and the eastern flank of the Sestas (2,571m). The Austro-Hungarians therefore built the Edelweiss position, which can still be seen today, on the open flank, consisting of trenches, bunkers and casemates.

The pass is the divide between the watersheds of the Adige, which flows west into the Adriatic Sea and the Piave, which flows east.

== Sports ==
The pass was first tackled in 1976 at the Giro d'Italia and has often been part of the route since then.

The Valparola Pass is the last of seven Dolomites mountain passes riders cross in the annual Maratona dles Dolomites single-day bicycle race.

== See also ==
- Dolomites
- Italian front (World War I)
- List of highest paved roads in Europe
- List of mountain passes
- White War
