= Pomagagnon =

Mountain in Italy

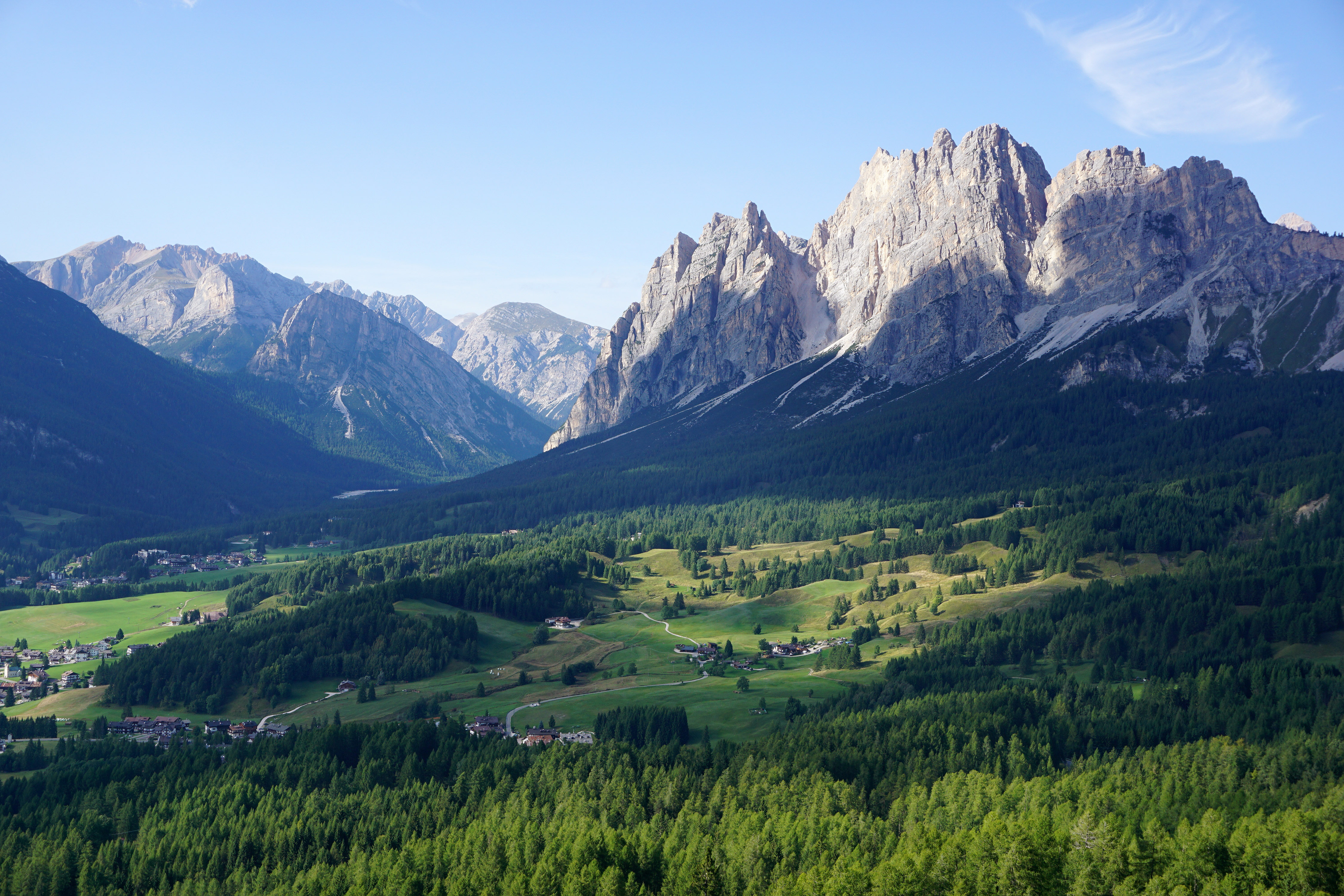
- Pomagnon seen from Faloria cable car, Cortina d'Ampezzo.

Highest point
- Elevation: 2,450 m (8,040 ft)
- Coordinates: 46°34′18″N 12°08′36″E

Geography
- Location within Alps
- Location: Veneto, Italy

Pomagagnon is a mountain of the Dolomites in Belluno, northern Italy. It has an elevation of 2,450 metres (8,038 ft) and is the southernmost mountain of the Cristallo Group, towering 1,200 metres (3,937 ft) over the resort of Cortina d'Ampezzo. The mountain is part of the Ampezzo Dolomites Natural Park.

== Gallery ==
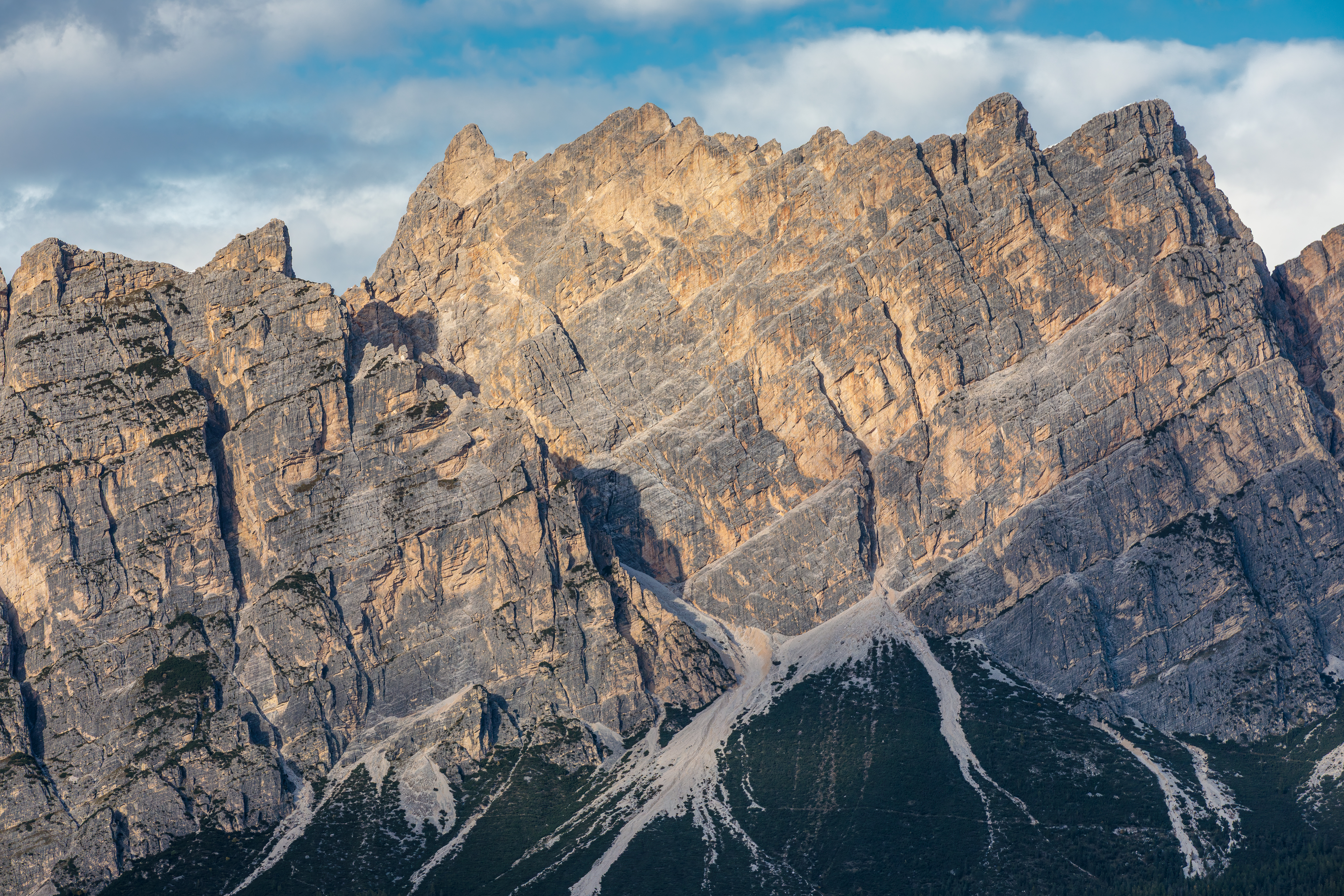
South face
