= Col Bechei =

Mountain in Italy

- Pareispitze
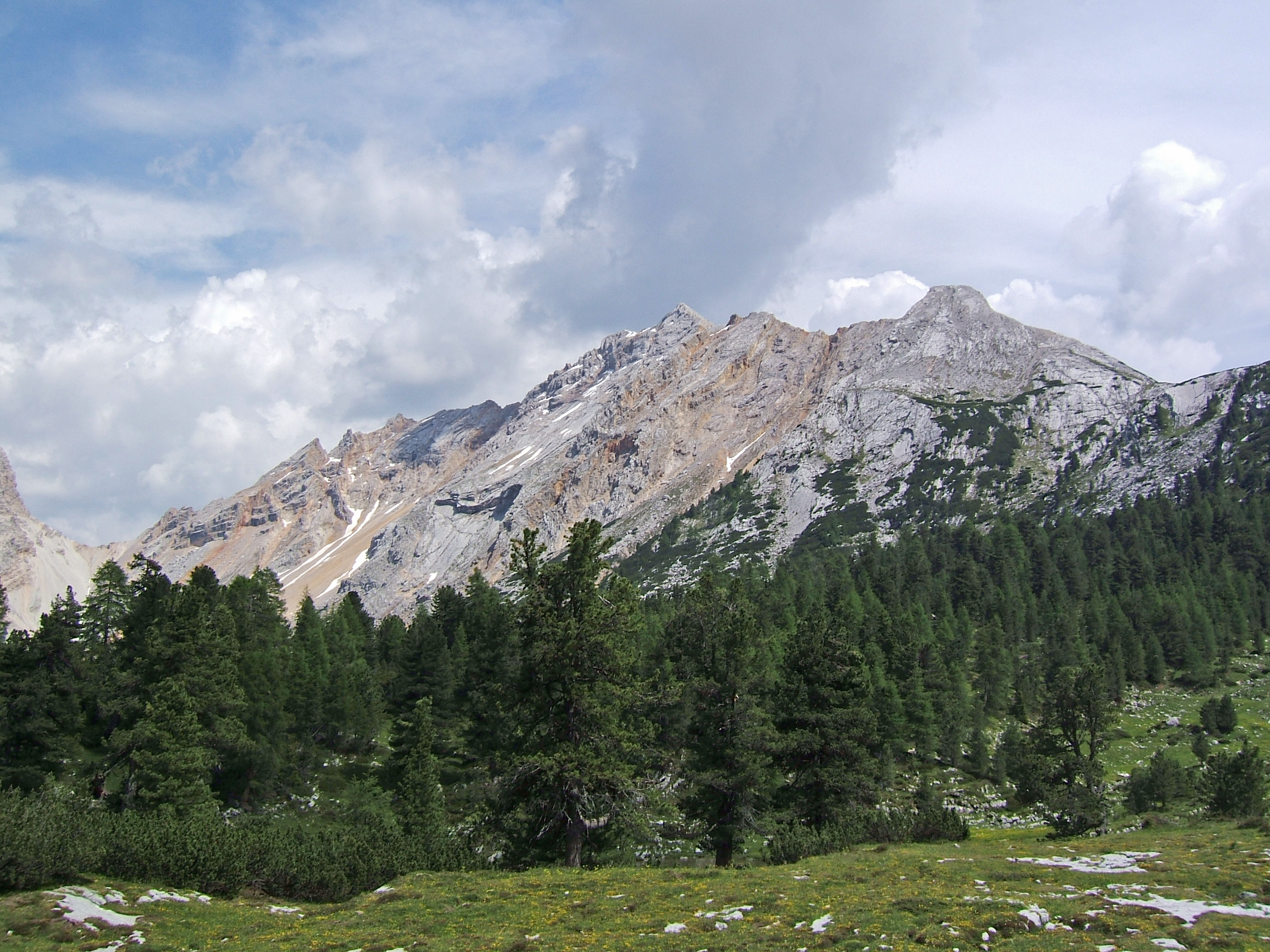
- Col Bechei from the NW

Highest point
- Elevation: 2,794 m (9,167 ft)
- Prominence: 622 m (2,041 ft)
- Coordinates: 46°36′29″N 12°02′38″E

Geography
- Location within Alps
- Location: South Tyrol, Italy
- Parent range: Dolomites

Col Bechei (2,794 m) is a mountain of the Dolomites, located between South Tyrol and Veneto, Italy. It lies in the Fanes group, northwest of Cortina d'Ampezzo. It is located in the Fanes-Sennes-Prags Nature Park in an area somewhat less frequented by tourists than other Domomite peaks.
