= Lagazuoi =

Mountain in the Dolomites

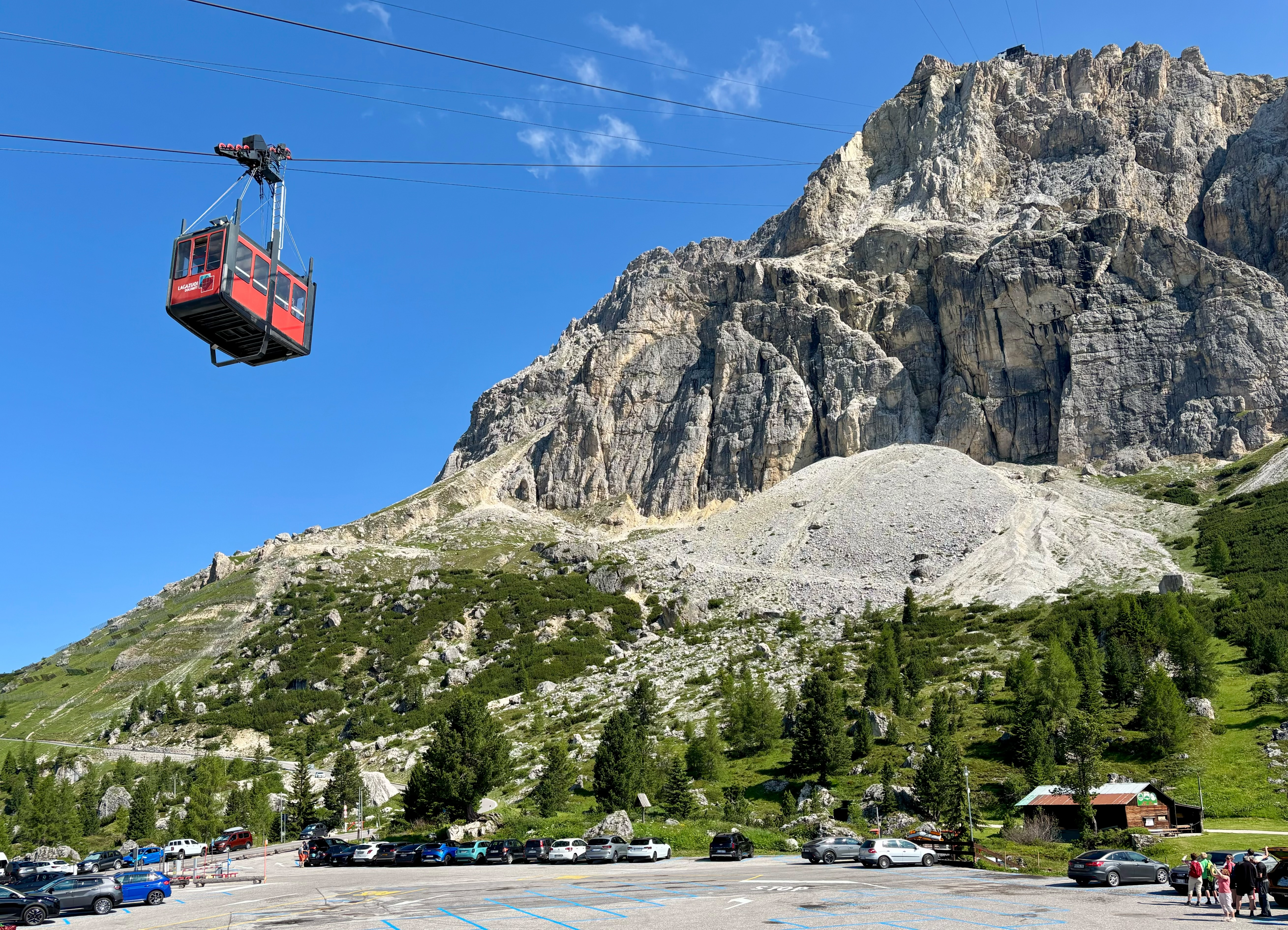
- Lagazuoi cable car takes passengers from Falzarego Pass (2,117 metres (6,946 ft)) to Rifugio Lagazuoi 2,752 metres (9,029 ft)

Highest point
- Elevation: 2,835 m (9,301 ft)
- Prominence: 183 m (600 ft)
- Parent peak: Fanis
- Isolation: 1.12 km (0.70 mi)
- Coordinates: 46°31′47″N 12°0′11″E

Geography
- Location within Alps
- Location: Province of Belluno, Italy
- Parent range: Dolomites

Lagazuoi is a mountain in the Dolomites of northern Italy, lying at an elevation of 2,835 metres (9,301 ft), about 18 kilometres (11 mi) southwest by road from Cortina d'Ampezzo in the Veneto Region. The mountain is part of the Ampezzo Dolomites Natural Park.

It is accessible by cable car and contains the Rifugio Lagazuoi, a mountain refuge situated beyond the northwest corner of Cima del Lago.

The mountain range is well known for its wartime tunnels and First World War mine warfare. The extensive tunnels were built by the Italian troops trying to wrest control from Austro-Hungarian troops who also built tunnels. The tunnels are now open as a de facto museum.

== See also ==
- Alta Via 1
- Italian front (World War I)
- White War
