= Ulrike Kindl =

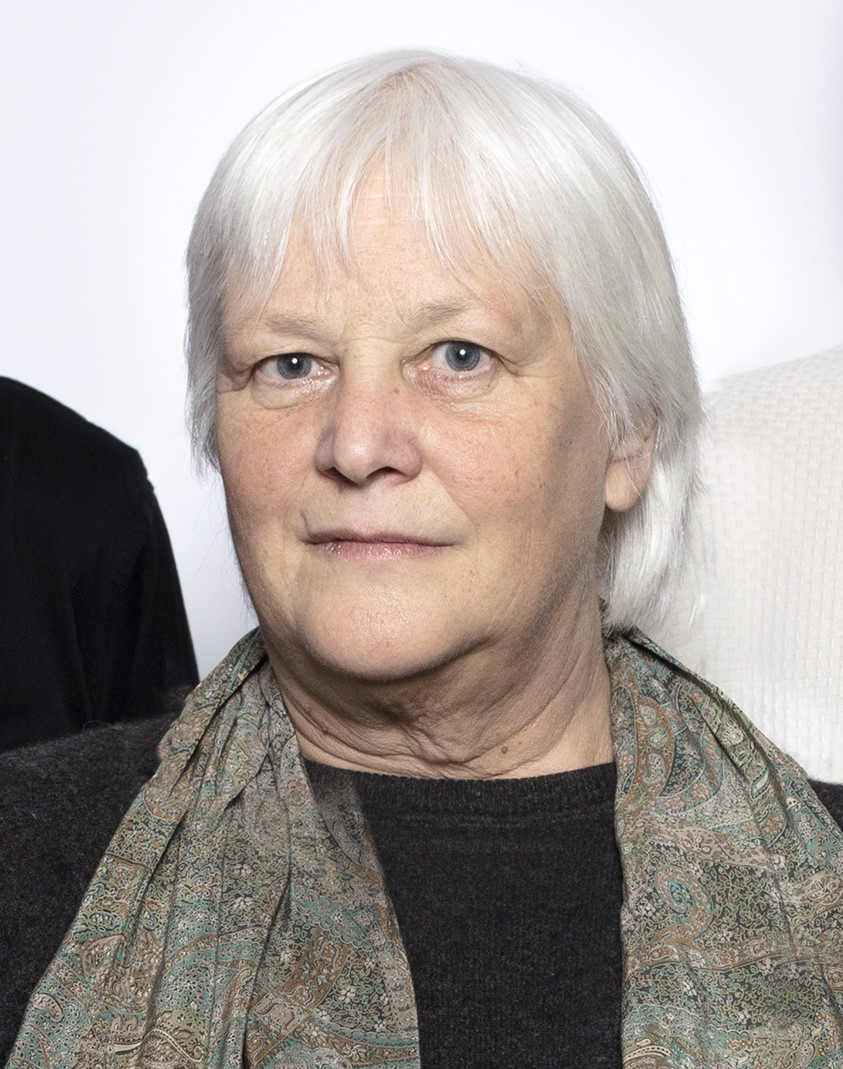
Ulrike Kindl in 2021

Ulrike Kindl (born 16 October 1951 in Merano) is an Italian folklorist and professor at the University Ca' Foscari in Venice, Dipartimento di Scienze del Linguaggio.

== Career ==
Kindl studied German Studies, Medieval Studies and Linguistics at Ca' Foscari University of Venice, LMU Munich and the Humboldt University of Berlin. In 1974, she graduated in foreign literature from Ca' Foscari University of Venice. She stayed there and in December 1974 was offered a position as an assistant at the university's Institute for German Language and Literature. At the same time, she deepened her German studies and worked on problems and methods of didactics. Between 1978 and 1986, she studied at the Humboldt University of Berlin and at the Institute for German as a Foreign Language at LMU Munich.

Since 1980, her research has focused on the field of folkloristic narrative research, fairy tales and legends of the Alpine region, as well as the points of contact between folk and art fairy tales.

In 1986, Ulrike Kindl became associate professor of German Language and Literature at Ca' Foscari University of Venice.

In addition to her university work, she is a research assistant in the field of folkloristics at the Ladin cultural institutes "Majon di Fascegn" (Vigo di Fassa, Trentino) and "Micurá de Rü" (St. Martin in Thurn, South Tyrol).

== Publications (selection) ==
- Kritische Lektüre der Dolomitensagen von Karl Felix Wolff. Volume I: Individual legends, St. Martin in Thurn: Istitut Ladin "Micurá de Rü", 1983
- Märchen aus den Dolomiten, München: Diederichs, 1992, ISBN 3-424-01094-4
- Kritische Lektüre der Dolomitensagen von Karl Felix Wolff. Volume II: Legend Cycles - The Tales of the Kingdom of Fanes, St. Martin in Thurn: Istitut Ladin "Micurá de Rü", 1997, ISBN 88-8171-003-X
- with Alessandro Baccin (ed.): Der Codex Brandis. The castles in the Burggrafenamt, the Vinschgau and the Oberinntal. Tangram: Merano, Osiride: Rovereto 2018, ISBN 978-88-7498-288-2.
- with Hannes Obermair, ed. (2020), The time in between. South Tyrol 1918-1922: From the end of the First World War to the Fascist regime / Il tempo sospeso. L'Alto Adige nel periodo tra la fine della Grande Guerra e l'ascesa del fascismo (1918-1922), Meran: Edizioni alphabeta Verlag, ISBN 978-88-95523-16-3

== List of publications ==
- Patrick Rina, Paolo Anvidalfarei: Ulrike Kindl: Werke und Aufsätze / Opere e saggi / Publicazions y articuli. In: Leander Moroder, Hannes Obermair, Patrick Rina (eds.): Lektüren und Relektüren - Leggere, riflettere e rileggere - Nrescides letereres y letures critiches. Studia Prof. Ulrike Kindl septuagenariae die XVI mensis Oct. anni MMXXI dicata. Istitut Ladin "Micurá de Rü", San Martin de Tor 2021, ISBN 978-88-8171-141-3, pp. 59–68.

== Literature ==
- Hans Heiss (2021-10-28), The cosmopolitan Merano, ff - Südtiroler Wochenmagazin, pp. 52–55
- Leander Moroder, Hannes Obermair, Patrick Rina (eds.): Lektüren und Relektüren - Leggere, riflettere e rileggere - Nrescides letereres y letures critiches. Studia Prof. Ulrike Kindl septuagenariae die XVI mensis Oct. anni MMXXI dicata. Istitut Ladin "Micurá de Rü", San Martin de Tor 2021, ISBN 978-88-8171-141-3.
