= Falzarego Pass =

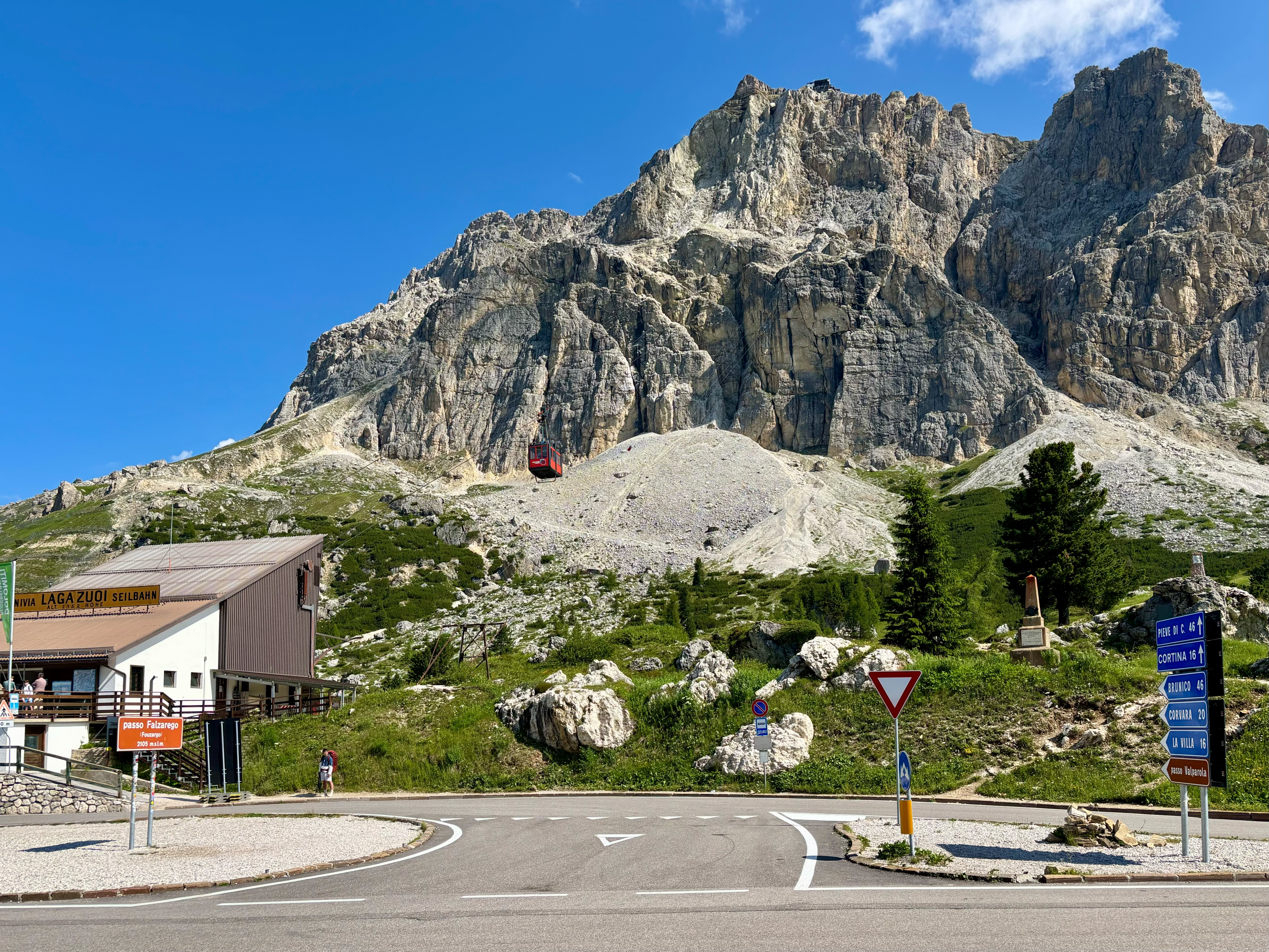
- Lagazuoi cable car starts from Falzarego Pass

- Location within Alps
- Elevation: 2,105 metres (6,906 ft)
- Length: 15 km (9.3 mi)
- Traversed by: SS48

Third Approach
- Location: Belluno, Italy
- Range: Dolomites
- Coordinates: 46°31′8″N 12°0′34″E

The Falzarego Pass (Italian: Passo di Falzarego, Ladin: Jou de Fauzare) (el. 2,105 m) is a high mountain pass in the province of Belluno in Italy.

It mainly connects the territory of Agordo and Cortina d'Ampezzo. From the pass, starts also SP24 (Strada provinciale del Passo di Valparola) directed northbound to Val Badia passing below Sass de Stria and through Valparola Pass.

A gondola rises to the Lagazuoi (2,762 m), which was the object of heavy combat and mine warfare in World War I. The tunnel that the Italians built under the Austro-Hungarian lines is open to the public.

== Etymology ==
The name probably derives from Ladin fóuze, scythe. A popular folk etymology claims that it supposedly comes instead from Faúza Règo, which would mean false king in Ladin, but is not attested in this form in the language. It would refer to the king of the Fanes, who was supposedly turned to stone for betraying his people.

== Sports ==
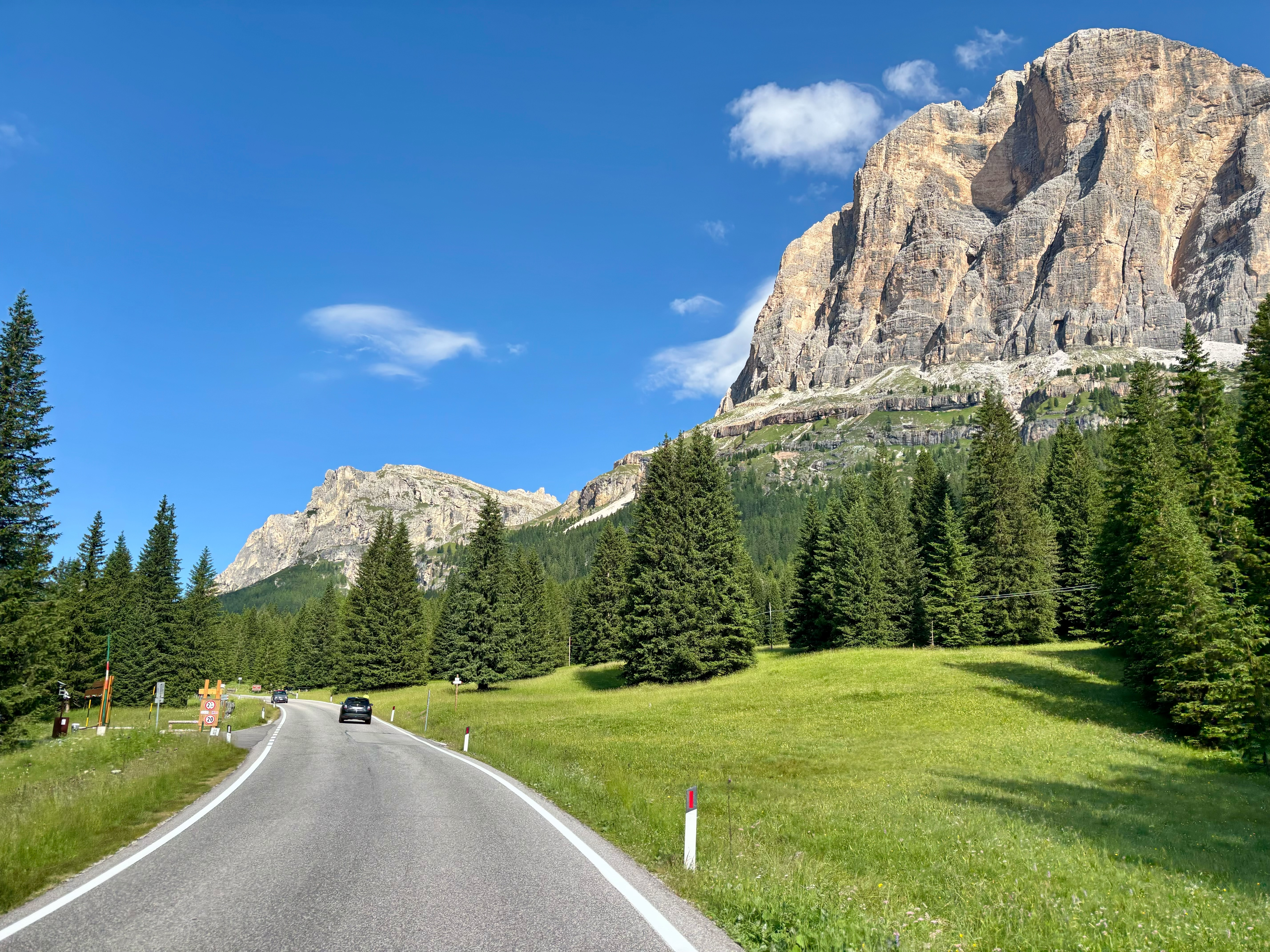
The eastern ramp of Falzarego Pass

The pass is occasionally in the program of the Giro d'Italia race.

The Falzarego Pass is one of the Dolomites mountain passes riders cross in the annual Maratona dles Dolomites single-day bicycle race. As riders proceed directly from the Falzarego Pass to the higher Valparola Pass the Falzarego is not counted as one of the canonical seven Maratona passes.

== See also ==
- Alta Via 1
- Dolomites
- Italian front (World War I)
- List of highest paved roads in Europe
- List of mountain passes
- White War
