= Hohe Gaisl =

Mountain in Italy

- Croda Rossa d'Ampezzo
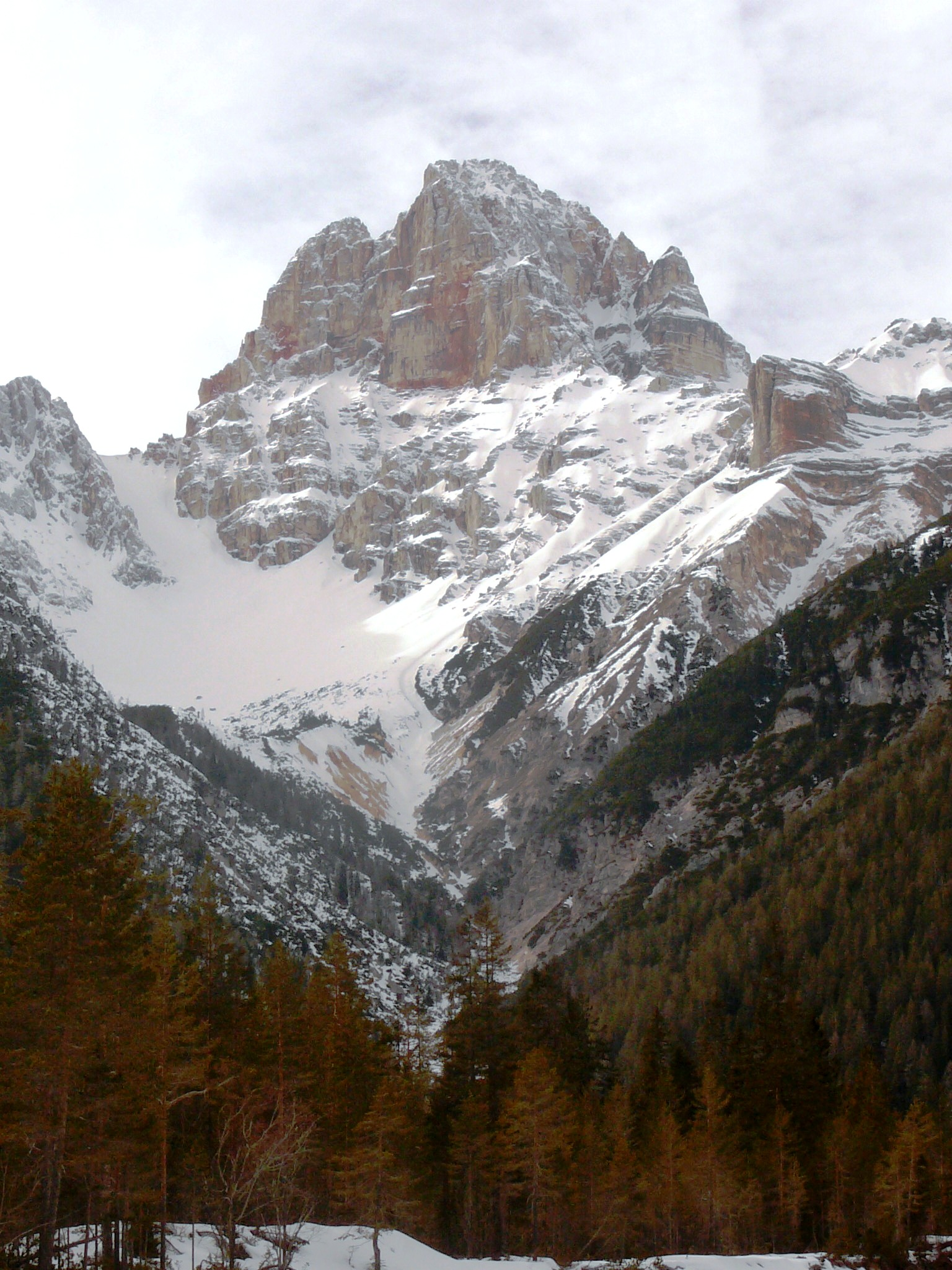
- Hohe Gaisl

Highest point
- Elevation: 3,146 m (10,322 ft)
- Prominence: 1,133 m (3,717 ft)
- Isolation: 7.46 km (4.64 mi)
- Listing: Alpine mountains above 3000 m
- Coordinates: 46°38′N 12°09′E

Geography
- Location within Alps
- Location: South Tyrol and Veneto, Italy
- Parent range: The Dolomites

Climbing
- First ascent: 1870
- Easiest route: from the northwest

Hohe Gaisl (Croda Rossa d'Ampezzo in Italian), (3,146m) is a mountain in the northern Dolomites, on the border of South Tyrol and Veneto, in northern Italy, located between the Braies Valley and the Val di Landro.

It lies as an imposing and prominent mountain, dominating the valleys underneath it. Its summit has a pyramid shape, and the mountain's slopes glow a deep red colour, a feature it has in common with many Dolomite peaks. The mountain is rarely climbed as it is particularly prone to rockfall. It is more appreciated for its beauty.
