= Cristallo (mountain) =

Mountain range in the Dolomites

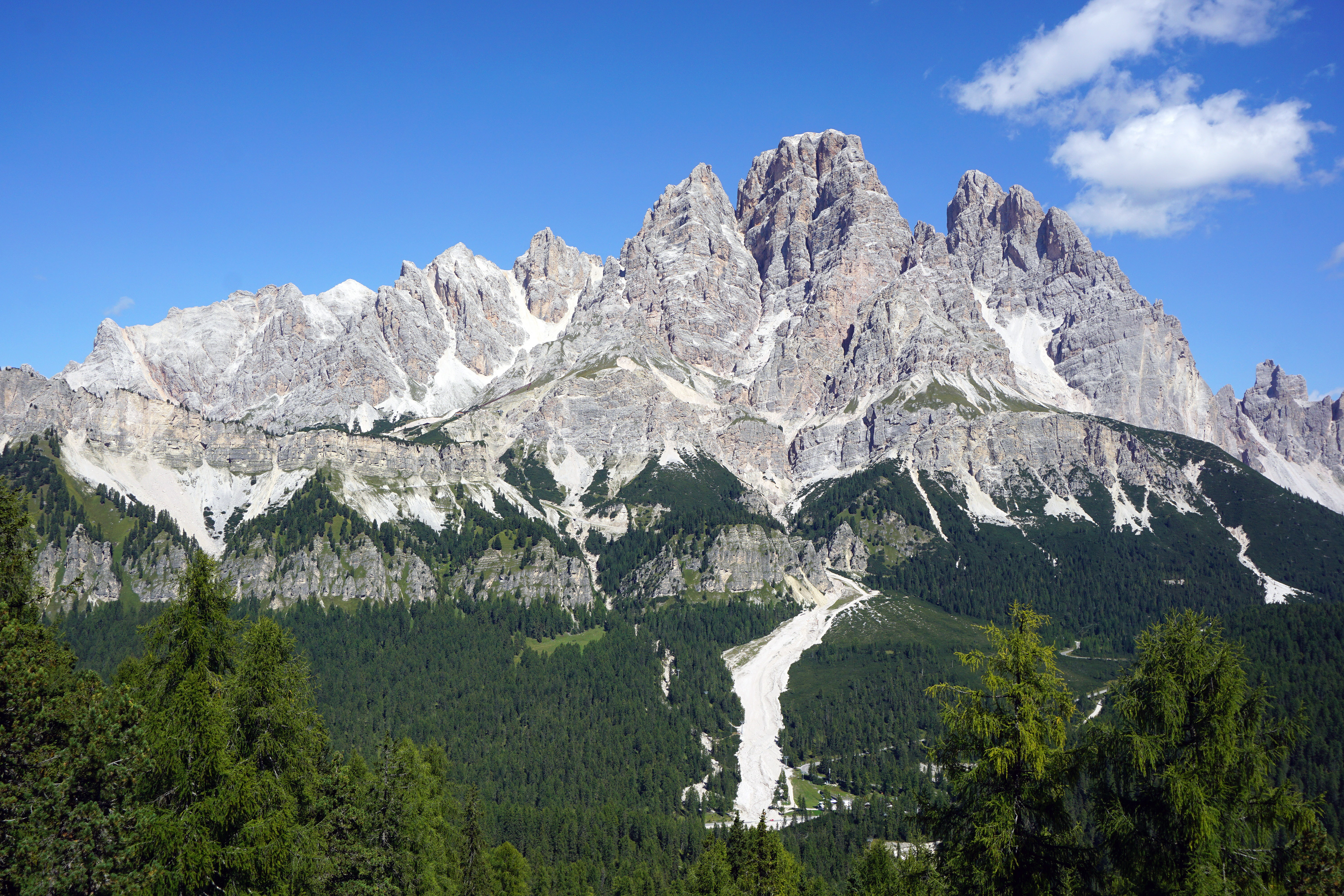
- Cristallo, south side

Highest point
- Elevation: 3,221 m (10,568 ft)
- Prominence: 1,416 m (4,646 ft)
- Listing: Alpine mountains above 3000 m
- Coordinates: 46°35′N 12°11′E

Geography
- Location within Italy
- Location: Belluno, Italy
- Parent range: Dolomites

Climbing
- First ascent: 1865 (Monte Cristallo – Paul Grohmann, Angelo Dimai, Santo Siorpaes)

Cristallo (Italian pronunciation: [kriˈstallo]) (German: Kristallspitze) is a mountain massif in the Italian Dolomites, northeast of Cortina d'Ampezzo, in the province of Belluno, Veneto, northern Italy. It is a long, indented ridge with four summits higher than 3,000 metres. The mountain range is part of the Ampezzo Dolomites Natural Park.

In the north of the Cristallo group is the 1,530 m high mountain pass "Cimabanche" (in German: "Im Gemärk" also "Gemärk Pass", in Ladin: "Sorabances"), in the south the mountain pass Tre Croci (1,809 m, in Ladin: "Son Zuógo").

== Peaks ==
The highest peaks of the Cristallo massif are Monte Cristallo (3,221 m), Cima di Mezzo (3,154 m), Piz Popena (3,152 m) and Cristallino d'Ampezzo (3,008 m). Cima di Mezzo and Cristallino d'Ampezzo can be reached by via ferratas, while Monte Cristallo and Piz Popena both require climbing skills.

=== First climbs ===
- Monte Cristallo (3,221 m): 1865 (Paul Grohmann, Angelo Dimai, Santo Siorpaes), 1874 (first woman: Anna Ploner)
- Cima di Mezzo (3,154 m): 1881 (John Stafford Anderson, Santo Siorpaes, Giuseppe Ghedina)
- Piz Popena (3,152 m): 1870 (Eduard R. Whitwell, Santo Siorpaes, Christian Lauener)
- Cristallino d'Ampezzo (3,008 m): 1886 (Michael Innerkofler, A. Angerer)
- Campanile Dibona, Monte Cristallo – west peak, (2,550 m – 8,370 ft), 1908 – solo Angelo Dibona

== Geology ==
Cristallo is largely formed from the Upper Triassic dolomitic rock Dolomia principale. The mountain was formed during Cretaceous, as well as the rest of the Dolomites, due to the collision between the African and European continents.

== Access ==
A cable lift system starts from Rio Gere in Val Begontina, first a lift to Rifugio Son Forca at the upper end of Val Padeon. The gondola lift up to Forcella Staunies (2,919 m), close to Rifugio G. Lorenzi (2,932 m), was built for the Winter Olympics in Cortina in 1956. Both the lift and the refuge closed in summer 2016 due to "technical and administrative problems".

The Dolomite Highway number 3 goes through the eastern part of the massif.

=== Via ferratas ===
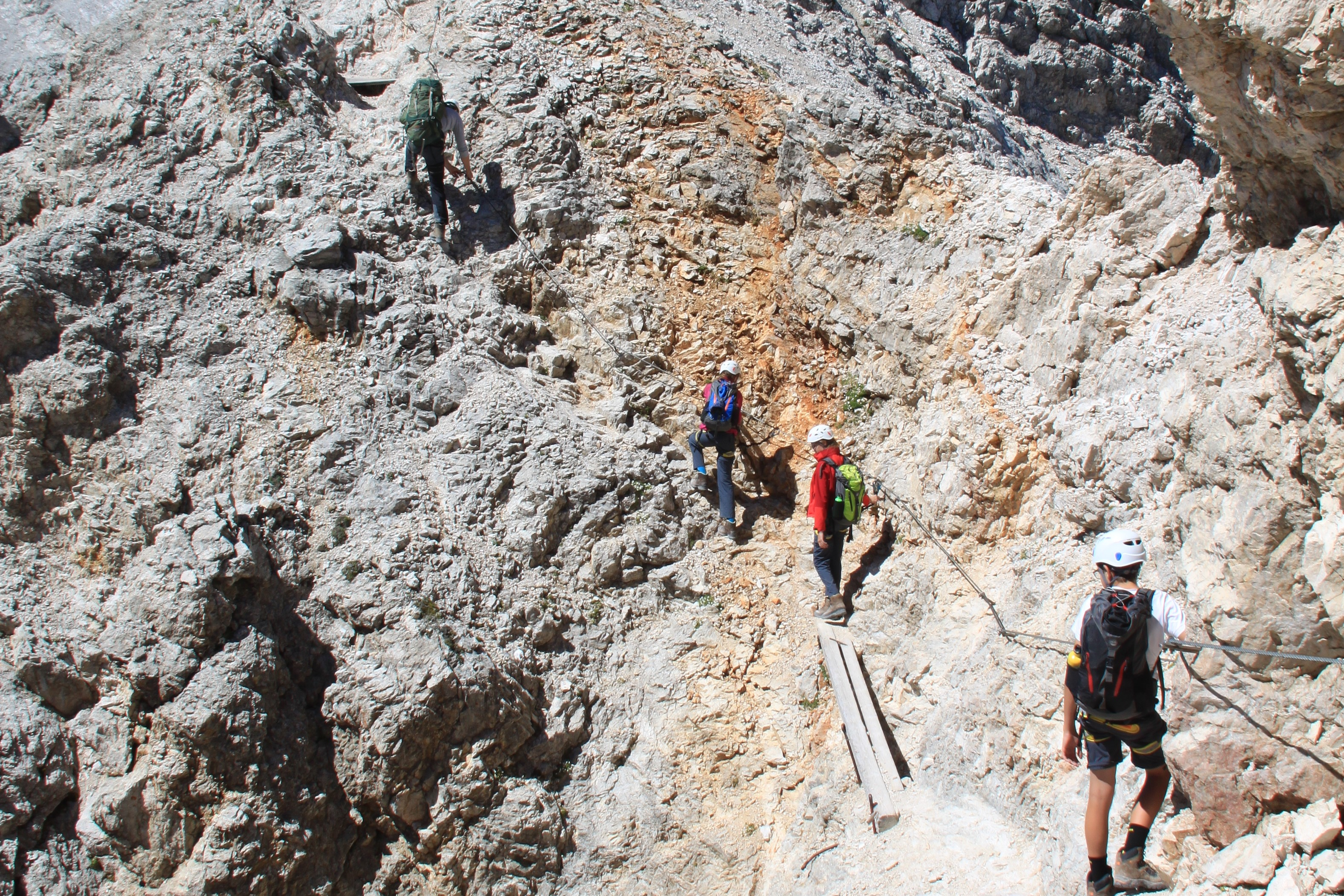
At the Monte Cristallo at the beginning of the VF Ivano Dibona at approx. 3000m.

The two via ferratas VF Ivano Dibona and VF Marino Bianchi both start from the top of the cable car at Forcella Staunies. VF Marino Bianchi can be followed to the peak Cima di Mezzo.

VF Ivano Dibona follows the Zurlon-ridge. It is a historical route used in World War I, and later restored and made safe for tourists. At the beginning is the longest via ferrata suspension bridge in the Dolomites, the 27-metre-long Ponte Cristallo.

The via ferrata VF Renato de Pol can be used for access from the western side of the Cristallo massif.

== Winter sports ==
Cristallo is one of the major skiing areas in the surroundings of Cortina. The former Staunis Verticale slope is one of the steepest in the Alps. There are numerous freeride ski routes on Monte Cristallo. The very steep gullies of the Forcella Staunis are known. To the east of Monte Cristallo there is a small ski area at Lake Misurina.

== Cabins (rifugi) and restaurants ==
Some of the cabins and restaurants available are the Rifugio Son Forca at 2,235 m; Capanna Guido Lorenzi at 3,003 m (Auronzo di Cadore); Ristorante Rio Gere at 1,680 m; Ristorante Lago Scin at 1,336 m; Ristorante Staulin at 1,370 m; Ristorante Son Zuogo at 1,800 m.

== History ==
During World War I there was considerable military activity in the mountain. The front lines between Italian and Austro-Hungarian troops went through the mountains. Remains of ladders and barracks are still found today, and transport lines (ferratas) have been restored. At the passes Cimabanche and Tre Croci there are Italian bunkers from the time of World War II.

== Popular culture ==
In 1993 the film Cliffhanger was shot on and around the bridge on the Zurlon-ridge, as well as some of the other peaks in the area. The mountain film The Blue Light from 1932 revolves around Monte Cristallo.

A legend narrates that on Monte Cristallo lived a beautiful princess who had many suitors, whom she always turned down.

== See also ==
- Golden age of alpinism
- Italian front (World War I)
- Silver age of alpinism
- White War

== Gallery ==
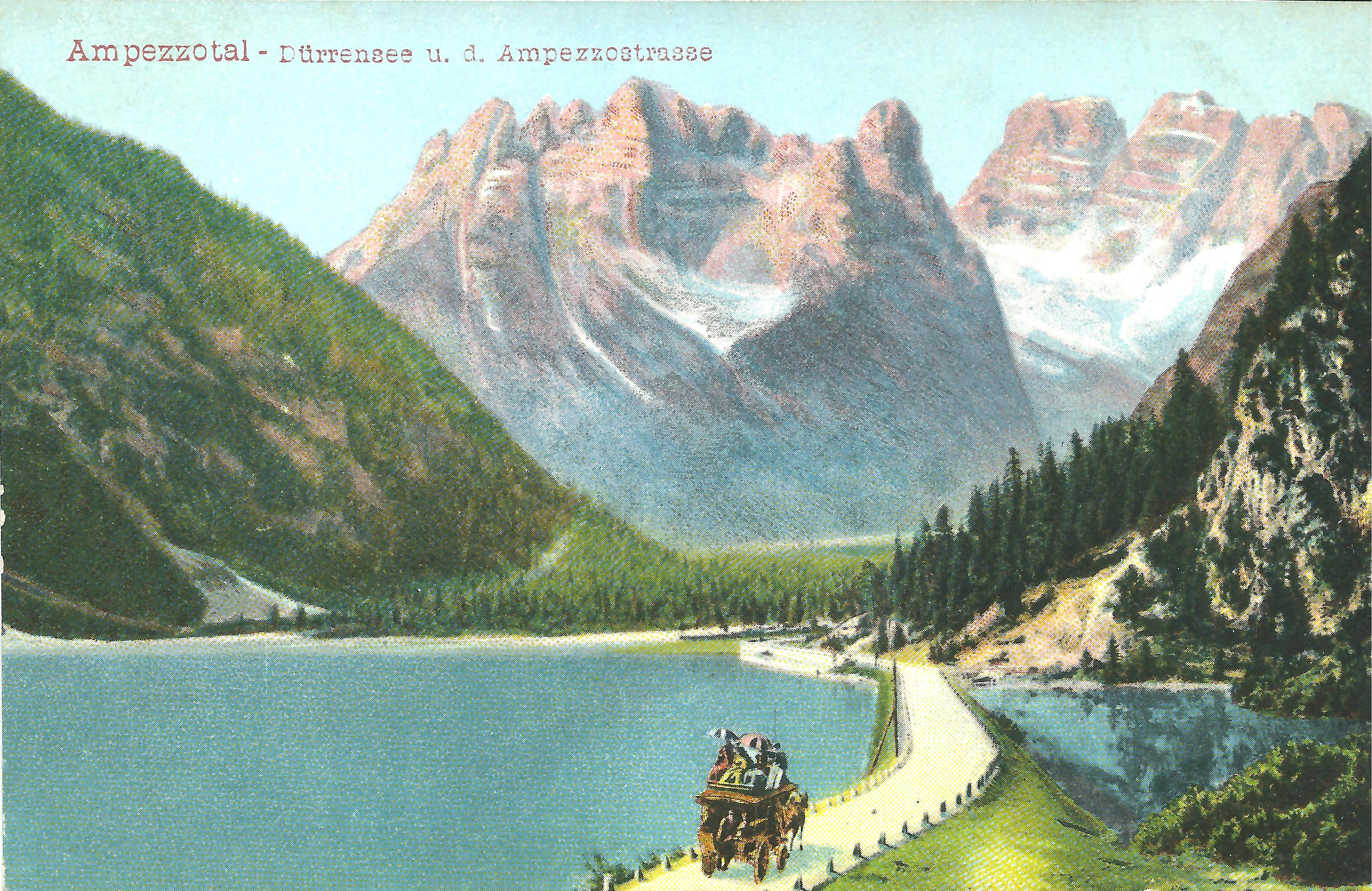
Monte Cristallo from the north with the Dürrensee in the foreground

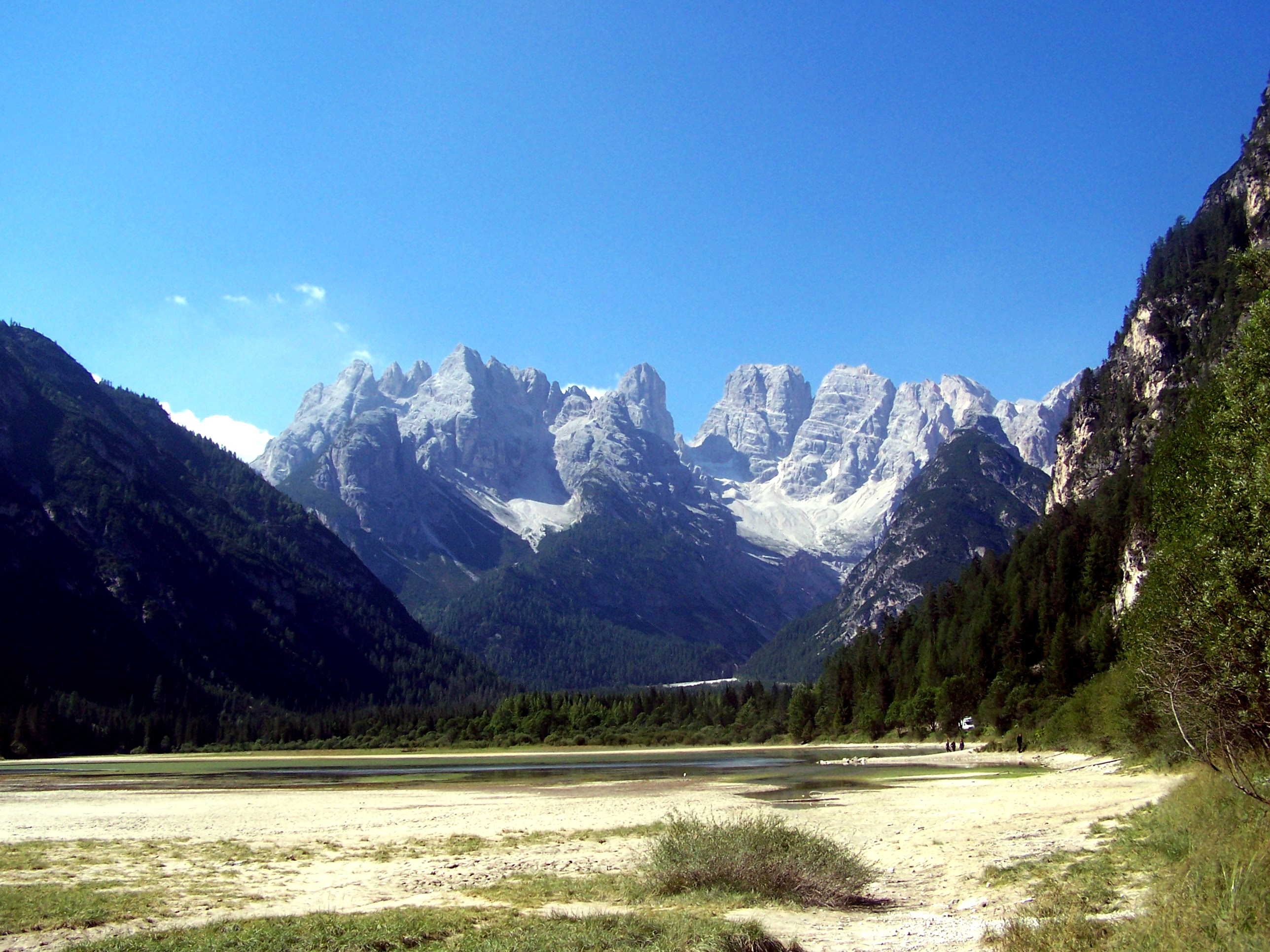
Monte Cristallo from the north with the Dürrensee in the foreground

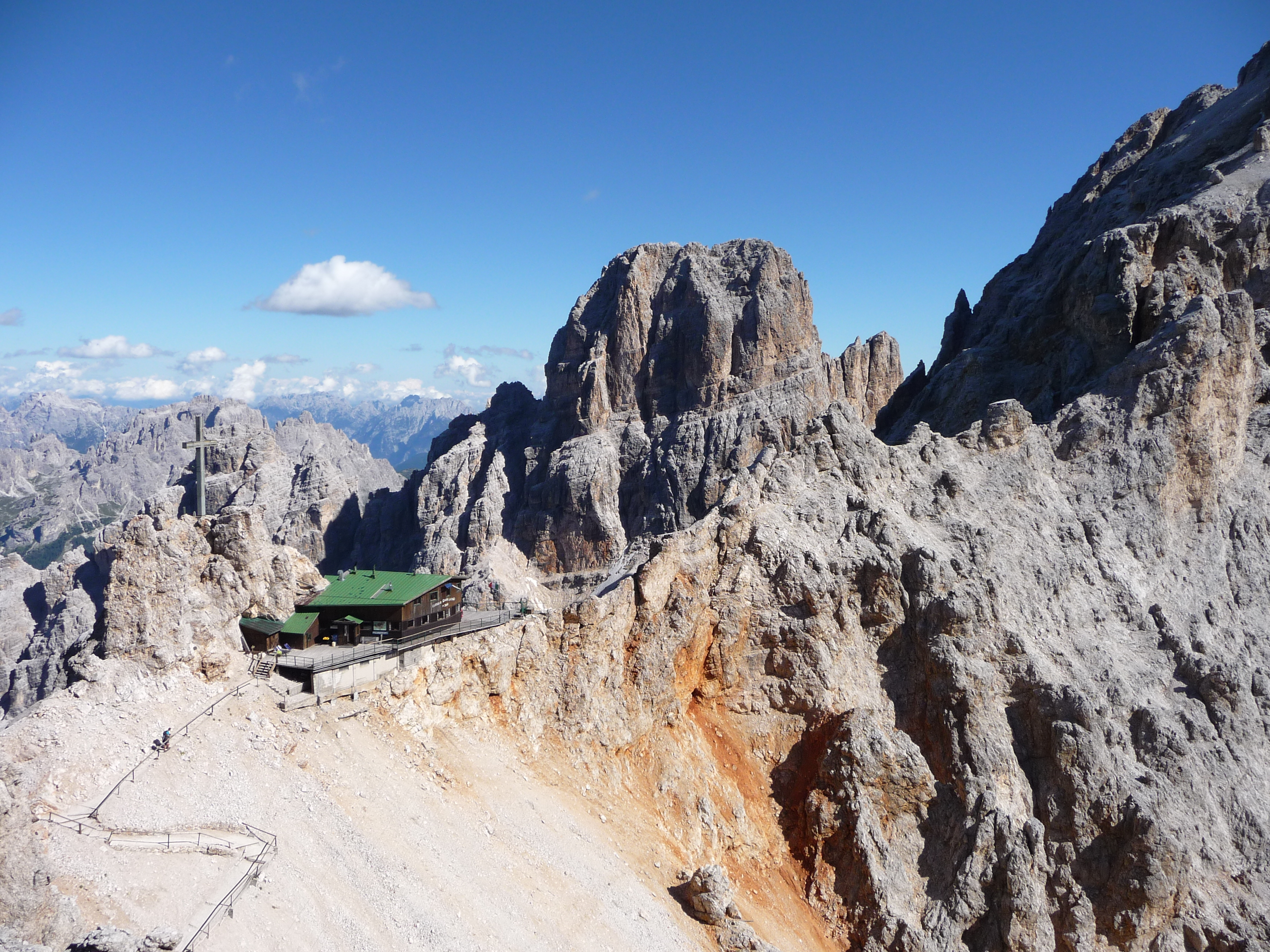
Forcella Staunies and Rifugio Lorenzi seen from Cristallino d'Ampezzo, in the background the Piz Popena

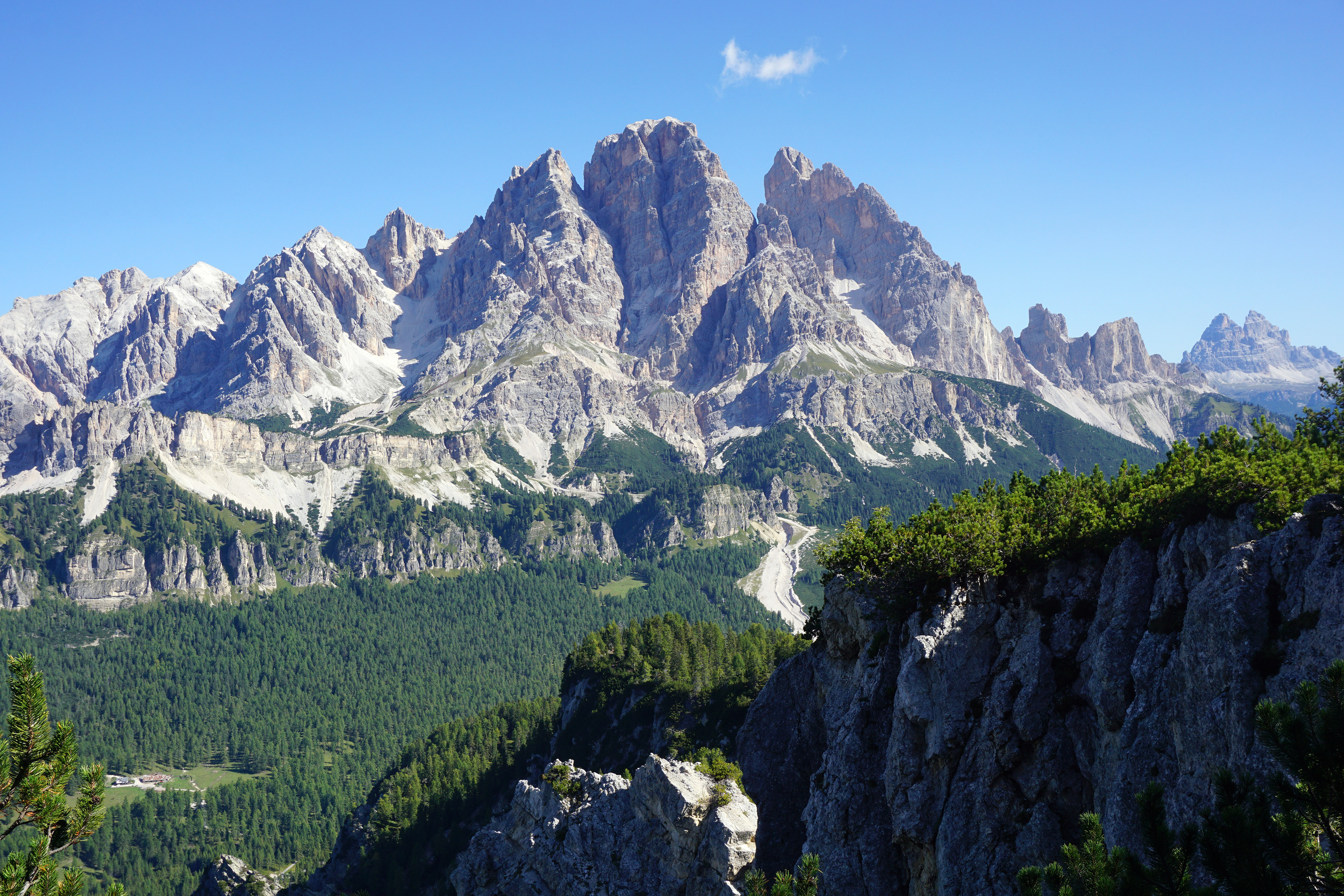
Monte Cristallo from the south

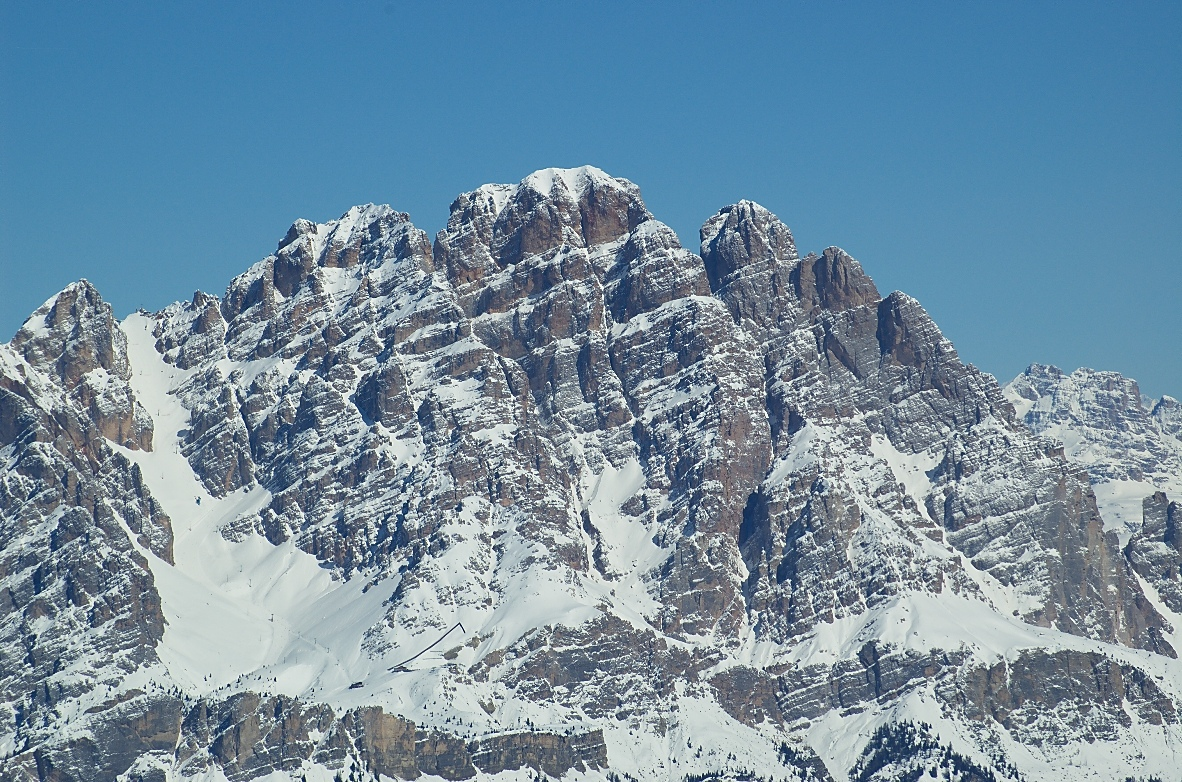
Monte Cristallo from the south, left the Forcella Staunies

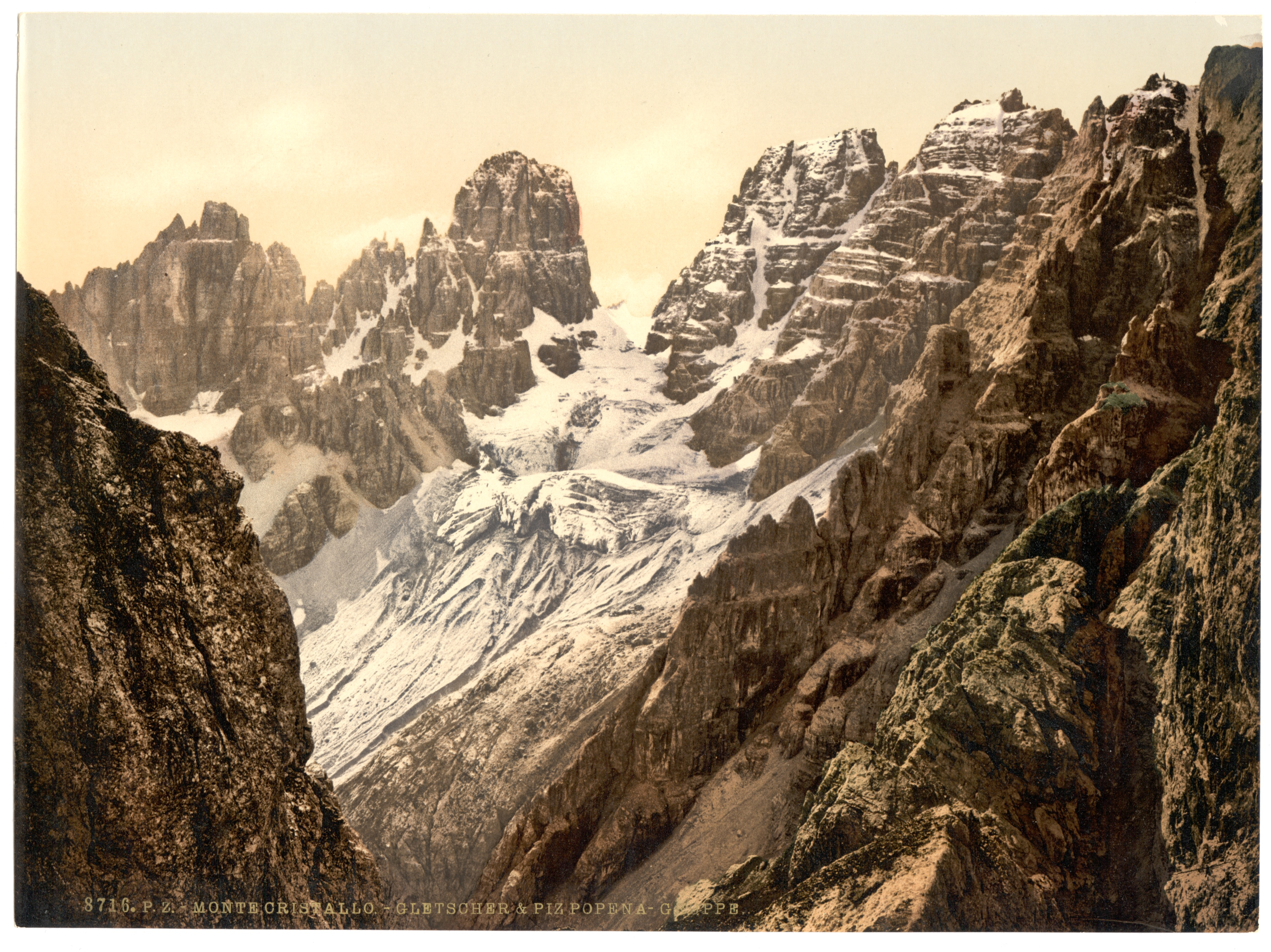
The glacier of the Monte Cristallo and Piz Popena group (before 1900)
