= Karl Felix Wolff =

South Tyrolean journalist, writer and folklorist (1879-1966)

- Born: 21 May 1879; Karlstadt, Austria-Hungary (present-day, Karlovac, Croatia)
- Died: 25 November 1966 (aged 87); Bolzano, South Tyrol, Italy
- Occupations: Journalist; poet; writer; folklorist

Karl Felix Wolff (Italian: Carlo Felice Wolff; 1879–1966) was a South Tyrolean journalist, poet, writer and self-taught folklorist known for collecting and publishing Ladinian legends.

== Life ==
Karl Felix Wolff was born on 21 May 1879 in Karlstadt, Austria-Hungary (present-day, Karlovac, Croatia). His father was an Austrian officer and his mother was Lucilla von Busetti, from the Non Valley. When he was a child his family moved to Bolzano, South Tyrol, where he heard local Ladinian legends from his nanny during a lengthy illness.

Wolff became a journalist and author, but spent much time travelling through the Dolomites asking the people he met, especially the old, if they could recall the local legends, which he recorded in his notebook, and later published. He proposed that the Ladinian population of the Dolomite valleys had once had a matriarchal society. He discovered the saga of the Kingdom of Fanes by piecing together the fragments of legend that he had collected with his friend Hugo von Rossi. Since he had not received a university education, for a long time his stories were attacked as his own inventions. He was only recognized towards the end of his long life.

Wolff was a pan-German nationalist, and thought that Germans were the original Indo-German people. During World War I (1914–18) he published articles in the Alldeutsche Blätter in which he called the Italians and French representatives of the African and Asiatic races, who had the audacity to attack the European Germans. In 1918 he wrote, "The next bimillenium will be the age of the Germans, for German history is just repeating Indo-German history, and the world is about to become German in the same way it once became Indo-German. Some of the articles were so extreme that they were translated and published by the French propagandists.

Karl Felix Wolff died on 25 November 1966 in Bolzano.

== Selected works ==
Wolff published a number of books in German, including collections of legends and descriptions of places, and also published magazine articles, booklets and leaflets. His interest was that of a poet and author rather than an anthropologist, so the legends are probably not entirely authentic.

=== German language ===
- Monographie der Dolomitenstraße und des von ihr durchzogenen Gebiets. Ein Handbuch für Dolomitenfahrer mit touristischen, geschichtlichen und wissenschaftlichen Erläuterungen. Bolzano (1908).
- Bozen, Tirol. Moser. 1908.
- Bozner führer, mit 3 karten, 1 stadtplan und 32 abbildungen, hrsg. vom Fremden-verkehrs- und verschönerungs-verein für Bozen und umgebung. Druck der Wagner' schen universitäts- buchdruckerei. 1909.
- Bozen-Gries und Umgebung: praktischer Reiseführer. Goldschmidt. 1911.
- Dolomiten-Sagen. Gesamtausgabe. Sagen und Überlieferungen, Märchen und Erzählungen der ladinischen und deutschen Dolomitenbewohner. Mit zwei Exkursen: Berner Klause und Gardasee. Innsbruck (1913).
- Vom Wein im Etschland. Plaudereien über die Wimmzeit und den Wein nebst einer kleinen Sammlung von Weingeschichten, wie sie in alter Zeit erzählt wurden auf und ab an der Etsch. Bolzano (1925).
- Rassenlehre. S.n. 1927.
- Canazei. Das Zentrum der Dolomiten. Canazei (1927).
- Ortisei. Bolzano (c. 1930)
- Dolomitenfahrt. Eine Schilderung des Dolomitengebietes mit besonderer Berücksichtigung seines Haupt-Durchzugs-Weges Bolzano (Bozen) – Dobbiaco (Toblach). Bolzano 1931.
- König Laurin und sein Rosengarten. Ein höfisches Märchen aus den Dolomiten. Nach der mittelhochdeutschen Spielmanns-Dichtung "Laurin" und nach verschiedenen Volkssagen in freier Bearbeitung. Bolzano (1932).
- Cortina e le sue Dolomiti. Ist. Geogr. de Agostini. 1935.
- Dolomiten-Sagen: Sagen und Überlieferungen, Märchen und Erzählungen der ladinischen und deutschen Dolomitenbewohner. Ferrari. 1938.
- Alt-Völker Tirols. Eine grundsätzliche Stellungnahme zu den wichtigsten Fragen der heimischen Völkergeschichte in gemeinverständlicher Darlegung. Bolzano (1951).
- Der Ritter mit den Herbstzeitlosen. Höfisches Märchen aus den Toblacher Dolomiten. Nach alten Sagen und Überlieferungen der Dolomitenbewohner zusammengestellt und wiedergegeben. Brixen (1963).
- Abendland und Morgenland. Ein Einblick in die Probleme der neuesten Altertums- und Kulturforschung. Bolzano (1964).

=== Translations into Italian ===
The Italian translations, published by Cappelli Editore, hold selected legends originally published in various books.

- Il regno dei Fanes
- L'anima delle Dolomiti (prima edizione 1967, seconda edizione 1987)
- I monti pallidi (1987)
- Rododendri bianchi delle Dolomiti (1989)
- Ultimi Fiori delle Dolomiti (Licinio Cappelli Editore-Bologna 1953)

=== English versions ===
- The Dolomite Station Toblach and "Südbahn-Grand-Hotel". Toblach. Globus-Verlag. 1913.
- The Pale Mountains: Folk Tales from the Dolomites. Minton, Balch. 1927.
- The Dolomites and Their Legends. Translated by Baroness Lea Rukawina. V. Bolzano. 1930.

== Sources ==
- Diaz-Andreu, Margarita; Champion, Timothy (24 October 2014). Nationalism and Archaeology in Europe. Routledge. ISBN 978-1-317-60514-0.
- "Karl Felix Wolff". Forschungsinstitut Brenner-Archiv. Universität Innsbruck.
- Monaghan, Patricia (2011). Goddesses in World Culture. ABC-CLIO. ISBN 978-0-313-35465-6.
- Rupp-Eisenreich, Britta; Stagl, Justin (1995). Anthropologie et l'état pluri-culturel. Böhlau Verlag Wien. ISBN 978-3-205-98146-6.
- Vanin, Adriano (2015). "The Fanes' saga – Researches on the legend: A short history of the studies on the legend".
