= Fanes-Sennes-Prags Nature Park =

Coordinates: 46.66°N 12.05°E

Naturpark Fanes-Sennes-Prags
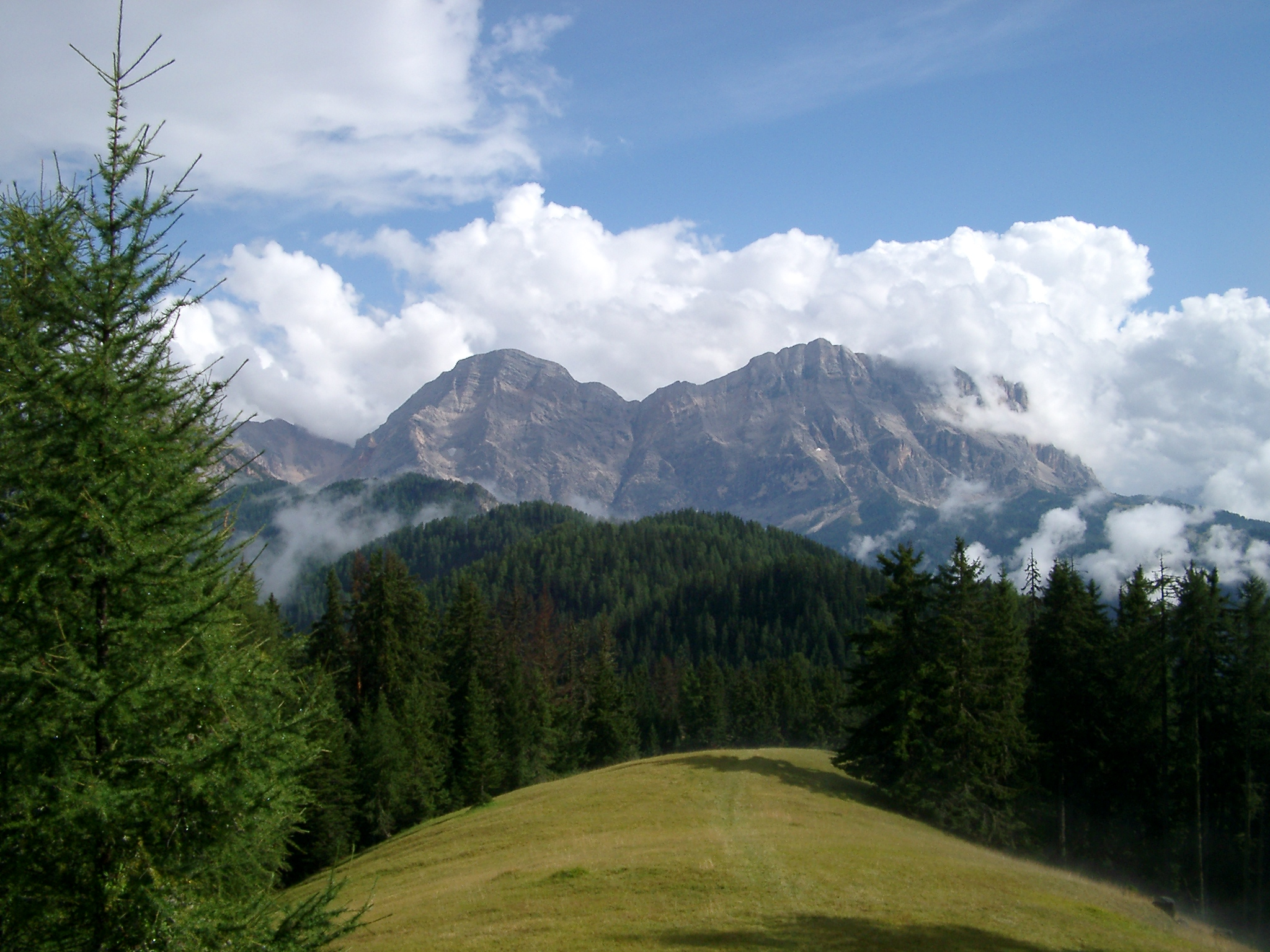
- Interactive map of Naturpark Fanes-Sennes-Prags
- Location: South Tyrol, Italy
- Area: 25,485 ha (62,975 acres)
- Established: 1980
- Website: www.provinz.bz.it/nature-territory/themes/naturpark-fanes-sennes-prags.asp

The Fanes-Sennes-Prags Nature Park (Ladin: Parch natural Fanes-Senes-Braies; Italian: Parco naturale Fanes-Sennes-Braies; German: Naturpark Fanes-Sennes-Prags) is a nature reserve in the Dolomites in South Tyrol, Italy.
