= List of mountains in Italy =

This article contains a sortable table listing mountains of Italy. All mountain heights and prominences on the list are from the largest-scale maps available. In the list, only the exact location of the culminating point of the mountain is considered.

== List ==
=== Alps ===
| Mountain | Height | | Drop (Note: Numbers in italics are estimates because a precise height for the key col is lacking.) | | Coordinates | Range (Note: For the Eastern Alps the range names are according to the Alpine Club classification of the Eastern Alps.) | Range (Note: SOIUSA codes, representing a proposal for a new classification system of the Alps. The codes usually but not always correspond to established ranges. Sorting on this tab puts the mountains in a geographic order, roughly from the southwest to the east.) | Province | First ascent |
| Mountain | m | ft | m | ft | Coordinates | Range | Range | Province | First ascent |
|---|---|---|---|---|---|---|---|---|---|
| Mont Blanc | 4,808 | 15,774 | 4,695 | 15,404 | 45°49′57″N 06°51′52″E | Mont Blanc massif | I/B-07.V-B | Aosta Valley | 1786 |
| Grenzgipfel | 4,618 | 15,151 | 10 | 33 | 45°56′12.3″N 07°52′04.8″E | Pennine Alps | I/B-09.III-A | Piedmont | 1861 |
| Lyskamm | 4,533 | 14,872 | 381 | 1,250 | 45°55′21″N 07°50′08″E | Pennine Alps | I/B-09.III-A | Aosta Valley | 1861 |
| Cervin / Cervino | 4,478 | 14,692 | 1,042 | 3,419 | 45°58′35″N 07°39′31″E | Pennine Alps | I/B-09.II-A | Aosta Valley | 1865 |
| Grandes Jorasses | 4,208 | 13,806 | 843 | 2,766 | 45°52′09″N 06°59′18″E | Mont Blanc massif | I/B-07.V-B | Aosta Valley | 1868 |
| Dent d'Hérens | 4,174 | 13,694 | 701 | 2,300 | 45°58′12″N 07°36′19″E | Pennine Alps | I/B-09.II-A | Aosta Valley | 1863 |
| Breithorn | 4,164 | 13,661 | 439 | 1,440 | 45°56′28″N 07°44′56″E | Pennine Alps | I/B-09.III-A | Aosta Valley | 1813 |
| Gran Paradiso / Grand Paradis | 4,061 | 13,323 | 1,888 | 6,194 | 45°31′05″N 07°16′02″E | Graian Alps - E | I/B-07.IV-A | Aosta Valley | 1860 |
| La Spedla | 4,020 | 13,190 | 8 | 26 | 46°22′51″N 09°54′26″E | Bernina Range | II/A-15.III-A | Sondrio | 1863 |
| Piz Zupò | 3,996 | 13,110 | 405 | 1,329 | 46°22′06″N 09°55′53″E | Bernina Range | II/A-15.III-A | Sondrio | 1863 |
| Grivola | 3,969 | 13,022 | 714 | 2,343 | 45°35′45″N 07°15′27″E | Graian Alps - E | I/B-07.IV-A | Aosta Valley | 1859 |
| Aiguille de Tré la Tête | 3,930 | 12,890 | 588 | 1,929 | 45°47′41″N 06°48′54″E | Mont Blanc massif | I/B-07.V-A | Aosta Valley | 1864 |
| Bellavista | 3,922 | 12,867 | 82 | 269 | 46°22′25″N 9°55′56″E | Bernina Range | | | 1868 |
| Ortler | 3,905 | 12,812 | 1,953 | 6,407 | 46°30′32″N 10°32′41″E | Ortler Alps | II/C-28.I-A | S-Tyrol | 1804 |
| Aiguille de Triolet | 3,870 | 12,700 | 301 | 988 | 45°55′00″N 07°01′28″E | Mont Blanc massif | I/B-07.V-B | Aosta Valley | 1874 |
| Königspitze | 3,851 | 12,635 | 424 | 1,391 | 46°28′43″N 10°34′06″E | Ortler Alps | II/C-28.I-A | S-Tyrol/Sondrio | 1854 |
| Monte Viso | 3,841 | 12,602 | 2,062 | 6,765 | 44°40′03″N 07°05′27″E | Cottian Alps - S | I/A-04.I-C | Cuneo | 1861 |
| Bouquetins | 3,838 | 12,592 | 490 | 1,610 | 45°58′56″N 07°32′43″E | Pennine Alps | I/B-09.II-A | Aosta Valley | 1871 |
| Mont Dolent | 3,820 | 12,530 | 330 | 1,080 | 45°55′21″N 07°02′46″E | Mont Blanc massif | I/B-07.V-C | Aosta Valley | 1864 |
| Aiguille des Glaciers | 3,816 | 12,520 | 301 | 988 | 45°46′43″N 06°48′09″E | Mont Blanc massif | I/B-07.V-A | Aosta Valley | 1878 |
| Aiguille Noire de Peuterey | 3,772 | 12,375 | 343 | 1,125 | 45°48′55″N 06°53′35″E | Mont Blanc massif | I/B-07.V-B | Aosta Valley | 1877 |
| Monte Cevedale | 3,769 | 12,365 | 531 | 1,742 | 46°26′38″N 10°37′00″E | Ortler Alps | II/C-28.I-A | Sondrio/Trentino | 1865 |
| Aiguille de Leschaux | 3,759 | 12,333 | 309 | 1,014 | 45°53′15″N 07°00′25″E | Mont Blanc massif | I/B-07.V-B | Aosta Valley | 1872 |
| Aiguille de la Grande Sassière | 3,747 | 12,293 | 792 | 2,598 | 45°30′18″N 07°00′00″E | Graian Alps - Central | I/B-07.III-A | Aosta Valley | 1808 |
| Weißkugel | 3,739 | 12,267 | 569 | 1,867 | 46°47′52″N 10°43′35″E | Ötztal Alps | II/A-16.I-A | S-Tyrol | 1845 |
| Mont Vélan | 3,726 | 12,224 | 620 | 2,030 | 45°53′30″N 07°15′06″E | Pennine Alps | I/B-09.I-B | Aosta Valley | 1779 |
| La Singla | 3,714 | 12,185 | 452 | 1,483 | 45°56′45″N 07°28′19″E | Pennine Alps | I/B-09.I-C | Aosta Valley | 1867 |
| Torre del Gran San Pietro / Tour du Grand-Saint-Pierre | 3,692 | 12,113 | 377 | 1,237 | 45°31′33″N 07°21′32″E | Graian Alps - E | I/B-07.IV-A | Aosta Valley/Turin | 1867 |
| Monte Disgrazia | 3,678 | 12,067 | 1,116 | 3,661 | 46°16′09″N 09°44′58″E | Bregaglia Range | II/A-15.III-B | Sondrio | 1862 |
| Punta San Matteo | 3,678 | 12,067 | 369 | 1,211 | 46°22′40″N 10°34′02″E | Ortler Alps | II/C-28.I-A | Sondrio/Trentino | 1865 |
| Uia di Ciamarella | 3,676 | 12,060 | 664 | 2,178 | 45°19′43″N 07°08′43″E | Graian Alps - Central | I/B-07.I-B | Turin | 1857 |
| Portjengrat: Pizzo d'Andolla | 3,654 | 11,988 | 411 | 1,348 | 46°06′03″N 08°02′05″E | Pennine Alps | I/B-09.V-B | V-C-O | 1871 |
| Ciarforon / Charforon | 3,643 | 11,952 | 349 | 1,145 | 45°29′36″N 07°14′50″E | Graian Alps - E | I/B-07.IV-A | Aosta Valley/Turin | 1871 |
| Hintere Schwärze (Note: The key col Hochjoch is 2,770 m (9,090 ft) in the literature and per local indications, but appears at least 20 m (66 ft) higher on the maps.) | 3,628 | 11,903 | 835 | 2,740 | 46°46′24″N 10°54′53″E | Ötztal Alps | II/A-16.I-A | S-Tyrol | 1867 |
| Levanna Centrale | 3,619 | 11,873 | 525 | 1,722 | 45°24′37″N 07°10′19″E | Levanna | I/B-07.I-C | Turin | 1875 |
| Grande Rousse | 3,607 | 11,834 | 525 | 1,722 | 45°33′48″N 07°05′04″E | Graian Alps - Central | I/B-07.III-A | Aosta Valley | 1874 |
| Aiguilles d'Entrèves | 3,600 | 11,800 | | | 45°50′38″N 6°54′58″E | Mont Blanc massif | | | 1897 |
| Tsanteleina | 3,602 | 11,818 | 490 | 1,610 | 45°28′46″N 07°02′46″E | Graian Alps - Central | I/B-07.III-A | Aosta Valley | 1865 |
| Piz Glüschaint | 3,594 | 11,791 | 341 | 1,119 | 46°21′45″N 09°50′24″E | Bernina Range | II/A-15.III-A | Sondrio | 1863 |
| Bessanèse | 3,592 | 11,785 | 386 | 1,266 | 45°18′08″N 07°07′10″E | Graian Alps - Central | I/B-07.I-B | Turin | 1857 |
| Mont Brulé | 3,578 | 11,739 | 365 | 1,198 | 45°57′18″N 07°32′18″E | Pennine Alps | I/B-09.II-A | Aosta Valley | 1876 |
| Croce Rossa (Note: East summit. West summit is 3,541 m (11,617 ft). On some maps neighboring Ouille d'Arbéron is higher.) | 3,571 | 11,716 | 499 | 1,637 | 45°15′38″N 07°08′05″E | Graian Alps - Central | I/B-07.I-B | Turin | 1857 |
| Monte Emilius / Mont Émilius | 3,559 | 11,677 | 733 | 2,405 | 45°40′44″N 07°23′05″E | Graian Alps - E | I/B-07.IV-C | Aosta Valley | 1826 |
| Presanella | 3,558 | 11,673 | 1,676 | 5,499 | 46°13′12″N 10°39′50″E | Adamello-Presanella Alps | II/C-28.III-B | Trentino | 1864 |
| Aouille Tseuque | 3,554 | 11,660 | 345 | 1,132 | 45°55′49″N 07°26′35″E | Pennine Alps | I/B-09.I-C | Aosta Valley | |
| Monte Leone | 3,553 | 11,657 | 1,144 | 3,753 | 46°14′58″N 08°06′36″E | Lepontine Alps | I/B-10.I-A | V-C-O | 1859 |
| Vertainspitze | 3,545 | 11,631 | 422 | 1,385 | 46°32′14″N 10°38′08″E | Ortler Alps | II/C-28.I-A | S-Tyrol | 1865 |
| Mount Adamello | 3,539 | 11,611 | 664 | 2,178 | 46°09′21″N 10°29′46″E | Adamello-Presanella Alps | II/C-28.III-A | Brescia | 1864 |
| Rocciamelone | 3,538 | 11,608 | 310 | 1,020 | 45°12′14″N 07°04′37″E | Graian Alps - Central | I/B-07.I-A | Turin | 1358 |
| Aiguilles Marbrées | 3,535 | 11,598 | | | 45°51′05″N 6°56′28″E | Mont Blanc massif | | | 1876 |
| Aiguille de Toule | 3,534 | 11,594 | | | 45°50′53″N 6°55′19″E | Mont Blanc massif | | | |
| Mont Gelé | 3,518 | 11,542 | 619 | 2,031 | 45°54′15″N 07°21′58″E | Pennine Alps | I/B-09.I-C | Aosta Valley | 1861 |
| Weißseespitze | 3,518 | 11,542 | 345 | 1,132 | 46°50′48″N 10°43′02″E | Ötztal Alps | II/A-16.I-A | S-Tyrol | 1870 |
| Fineilspitze | 3,514 | 11,529 | 504 | 1,654 | 46°46′49″N 10°49′55″E | Ötztal Alps | II/A-16.I-A | S-Tyrol | 1865 |
| Punta Tersiva / Pointe Tersive | 3,512 | 11,522 | 596 | 1,955 | 45°37′14″N 07°28′34″E | Graian Alps - E | I/B-07.IV-C | Aosta Valley | 1842 |
| Hochfeiler | 3,509 | 11,512 | 981 | 3,219 | 46°58′20″N 11°43′40″E | Zillertal Alps | II/A-17.I-B | S-Tyrol | 1865 |
| Aiguille de Scolette | 3,506 | 11,503 | 1,069 | 3,507 | 45°09′36″N 06°46′07″E | Cottian Alps - N | I/A-04.III-B | Turin | 1875 |
| Becca di Luseney / Pic de Luseney | 3,504 | 11,496 | 646 | 2,119 | 45°52′14″N 07°29′28″E | Pennine Alps | I/B-09.II-B | Aosta Valley | 1866 |
| Dreiherrnspitze | 3,499 | 11,480 | 581 | 1,906 | 47°04′09″N 12°14′27″E | Venediger Group | II/A-17.II-A | E-Tyrol/Salzburg/S-Tyrol | 1866 |
| Rötspitze | 3,496 | 11,470 | 653 | 2,142 | 47°01′37″N 12°12′19″E | Venediger Group | II/A-17.II-A | E-Tyrol/S-Tyrol | 1854 |
| Aiguille de la Grande Traversière | 3,496 | 11,470 | 342 | 1,122 | 45°31′23″N 07°03′21″E | Graian Alps - Central | I/B-07.III-A | Aosta Valley | 1885 |
| Mont Rion | 3,489 | 11,447 | 345 | 1,132 | 45°52′41″N 07°21′55″E | Grand Combin | I/B-09.I-C | Aosta Valley | |
| Grand Nomenon | 3,488 | 11,444 | 389 | 1,276 | 45°36′43″N 07°14′10″E | Graian Alps - N | I/B-07.IV-A | Aosta Valley | 1877 |
| Sonnighorn | 3,487 | 11,440 | 340 | 1,120 | 46°04′27″N 08°01′20″E | Pennine Alps | I/B-09.V-B | Valais/V-C-O | 1879 |
| Tête du Rutor / Testa del Rutor | 3,486 | 11,437 | 850 | 2,790 | 45°37′51″N 07°00′52″E | Graian Alps - Central | I/B-07.III-B | Aosta Valley | 1858 |
| Großer Möseler | 3,480 | 11,420 | 455 | 1,493 | 46°59′33″N 11°46′55″E | Zillertal Alps | II/A-17.I-B | N-Tyrol/S-Tyrol | 1865 |
| Hochwilde | 3,480 | 11,420 | 353 | 1,158 | 46°45′56″N 11°01′20″E | Ötztal Alps | II/A-16.I-A | N-Tyrol/S-Tyrol | 1852 |
| Hinterer Seelenkogel | 3,472 | 11,391 | 441 | 1,447 | 46°48′06″N 11°02′40″E | Ötztal Alps | II/A-16.I-B | N-Tyrol/S-Tyrol | 1871 |
| Carè Alto | 3,463 | 11,362 | 481 | 1,578 | 46°06′29″N 10°35′46″E | Adamello-Presanella Alps | II/C-28.III-A | Trentino | 1865 |
| Hintere Eggenspitze | 3,443 | 11,296 | 478 | 1,568 | 46°28′40″N 10°46′14″E | Ortler Alps | II/C-28.I-A | S-Tyrol/Trentino | 1868 |
| Roc du Mulinet | 3,442 | 11,293 | 342 | 1,122 | 45°22′51″N 07°09′46″E | Graian Alps - Central | I/B-07.I-B | Savoie/Turin | 1878 |
| Piz Tremoggia | 3,441 | 11,289 | 349 | 1,145 | 46°21′07″N 09°49′19″E | Bernina Range | II/A-15.III-A | Grisons/Sondrio | 1859 |
| Dosson di Genova | 3,441 | 11,289 | 313 | 1,027 | 46°08′55″N 10°33′13″E | Adamello-Presanella Alps | II/C-28.III-A | Brescia/Trentino | 1882 |
| Cima Piazzi | 3,439 | 11,283 | 1,202 | 3,944 | 46°25′00″N 10°17′06″E | Livigno Alps | II/A-15.IV-B | Sondrio | 1867 |
| Lagaunspitze | 3,439 | 11,283 | 422 | 1,385 | 46°44′21″N 10°44′21″E | Ötztal Alps | II/A-16.I-A | S-Tyrol | 1876 |
| Zufrittspitze | 3,439 | 11,283 | 309 | 1,014 | 46°30′07″N 10°46′56″E | Ortler Alps | II/C-28.I-A | S-Tyrol | 1868 |
| Cima dell'Aouillé | 3,445 | 11,302 | 460 | 1,510 | 45°31′36″N 07°08′52″E | Graian Alps - Central | I/B-07.III-A | Aosta Valley | 1880 |
| Hochgall | 3,436 | 11,273 | 1,148 | 3,766 | 46°54′39″N 12°08′23″E | Rieserferner Group | II/A-17.III-A | S-Tyrol | 1854 |
| Punta di Bioula / Pointe de Bioula | 3,427 | 11,243 | 463 | 1,519 | 45°35′12″N 07°10′00″E | Graian Alps - Central | I/B-07.III-A | Aosta Valley | |
| Hochfirst | 3,403 | 11,165 | 401 | 1,316 | 46°49′36″N 11°04′52″E | Ötztal Alps | II/A-16.I-A | N-Tyrol/S-Tyrol | 1870 |
| Brec de Chambeyron | 3,389 | 11,119 | 462 | 1,516 | 44°31′41″N 06°51′12″E | Cottian Alps - S | I/A-04.I-A | AHP/Cuneo | 1878 |
| Veneziaspitze | 3,386 | 11,109 | 354 | 1,161 | 46°27′14″N 10°41′21″E | Ortler Alps | II/C-28.I-A | S-Tyrol/Trentino | 1867 |
| Punta Sulè | 3,384 | 11,102 | 311 | 1,020 | 45°13′53″N 07°08′15″E | Graian Alps - SE | I/B-07.I-B | Turin | 1880 |
| Rognosa d'Etiache | 3,383 | 11,099 | 584 | 1,916 | 45°08′05″N 06°50′02″E | Cottian Alps - N | I/A-04.III-B | Savoie/Turin | 1875 |
| Grand Tournalin | 3,379 | 11,086 | 551 | 1,808 | 45°52′18″N 07°41′17″E | Monte Rosa | I/B-09.III-B | Aosta Valley | 1863 |
| Cima di Castello | 3,379 | 11,086 | 388 | 1,273 | 46°18′11″N 09°40′37″E | Bregaglia Range | II/A-15.III-B | Grisons/Sondrio | 1866 |
| Großer Löffler | 3,379 | 11,086 | 368 | 1,207 | 47°01′57″N 11°54′57″E | Zillertal Alps | II/A-17.I-B | N-Tyrol/S-Tyrol | 1843 |
| Mont d'Ambin | 3,378 | 11,083 | 501 | 1,644 | 45°09′24″N 06°53′04″E | Cottian Alps - N | I/A-04.III-B | Savoie/Turin | 1823 |
| Punta di Fontanella / Pointe des Fontanelles | 3,378 | 11,083 | 333 | 1,093 | 45°54′22″N 07°33′21″E | Pennine Alps | I/B-09.II-A | Aosta Valley | 1864 |
| Cima Viola | 3,374 | 11,070 | 1,073 | 3,520 | 46°23′01″N 10°11′47″E | Livigno Alps | II/A-15.IV-B | Sondrio | 1875 |
| Blinnenhorn | 3,374 | 11,070 | 945 | 3,100 | 46°25′33″N 08°18′28″E | Lepontine Alps | I/B-10.I-A | Valais/V-C-O | 1866 |
| Monte Confinale | 3,370 | 11,060 | 376 | 1,234 | 46°26′58″N 10°30′16″E | Ortler Alps | II/C-28.I-A | Sondrio | 1864 |
| Piz Cengalo | 3,369 | 11,053 | 620 | 2,030 | 46°17′42″N 09°36′07″E | Bregaglia Range | II/A-15.III-B | Grisons/Sondrio | 1866 |
| Schwarzenstein | 3,369 | 11,053 | 342 | 1,122 | 47°00′36″N 11°52′27″E | Zillertal Alps | II/A-17.I-B | N-Tyrol/S-Tyrol | 1852 |
| Piz Fora | 3,363 | 11,033 | 432 | 1,417 | 46°20′27″N 09°47′05″E | Bernina Range | II/A-15.III-A | Grisons/Sondrio | 1875 |
| Corno dei Tre Signori | 3,360 | 11,020 | 361 | 1,184 | 46°20′35″N 10°30′56″E | Ortler Alps | II/C-28.I-A | Brescia/Sondrio/Trentino | 1876 |
| Schneebiger Nock | 3,358 | 11,017 | 544 | 1,785 | 46°54′19″N 12°05′03″E | Rieserferner Group | II/A-17.III-A | S-Tyrol | 1866 |
| Grande Roise | 3,357 | 11,014 | 321 | 1,053 | 45°40′31″N 07°25′23″E | Graian Alps - N | I/B-07.IV-C | Aosta Valley | 1875 |
| Punta Penia | 3,343 | 10,968 | 2,134 | 7,001 | 46°26′05″N 11°51′03″E | Marmolada | II/C-31.III-B | Belluno/Trentino | 1864 |
| Mongioia | 3,340 | 10,960 | 685 | 2,247 | 44°37′12″N 06°56′59″E | Cottian Alps - S | I/A-04.I-A | AHP/Cuneo | 1823 |
| Roteck | 3,337 | 10,948 | 483 | 1,585 | 46°43′25″N 10°59′03″E | Ötztal Alps | II/A-16.I-B | S-Tyrol | 1872 |
| Punta Sommeiller | 3,332 | 10,932 | 339 | 1,112 | 45°07′42″N 06°51′09″E | Cottian Alps - N | I/A-04.III-B | Haute-Savoie/Turin | 1871 |
| Corno Baitone | 3,330 | 10,930 | 483 | 1,585 | 46°10′23″N 10°26′28″E | Adamello-Presanella Alps | II/C-28.III-A | Brescia | 1890 |
| Grande Rochère | 3,326 | 10,912 | 836 | 2,743 | 45°48′49″N 07°03′41″E | Grand Combin | I/B-09.I-A | Aosta Valley | 1832 |
| Busazza | 3,326 | 10,912 | 304 | 997 | 46°13′26″N 10°36′40″E | Adamello-Presanella Alps | II/C-28.III-B | Trentino | 1889 |
| Pizzo Scalino | 3,323 | 10,902 | 859 | 2,818 | 46°16′43″N 09°58′25″E | Bernina Range | II/A-15.III-A | Sondrio | 1830 |
| Corno Bianco | 3,320 | 10,890 | 446 | 1,463 | 45°49′22″N 07°52′44″E | Monte Rosa | I/B-09.III-C | Aosta Valley/Vercelli | 1831 |
| Testa Grigia / Tête grise / Groabhopt / Graukopf | 3,315 | 10,876 | 643 | 2,110 | 45°49′51″N 07°47′12″E | Monte Rosa | I/B-09.III-B | Aosta Valley | 1858 |
| Torre di Lavina / Tour de Lavina | 3,308 | 10,853 | 475 | 1,558 | 45°33′20″N 07°26′55″E | Graian Alps - N | I/B-07.IV-A | Aosta Valley/Turin | 1856 |
| Laaser Spitze | 3,305 | 10,843 | 318 | 1,043 | 46°33′43″N 10°43′04″E | Ortler Alps | II/C-28.I-A | S-Tyrol | 1855 |
| Piz Paradisin | 3,302 | 10,833 | 875 | 2,871 | 46°25′34″N 10°07′02″E | Livigno Alps | II/A-15.IV-B | Grisons/Sondrio | |
| Punta Ramiere | 3,302 | 10,833 | 673 | 2,208 | 44°51′51″N 06°55′54″E | Cottian Alps - C | I/A-04.II-B | H-Alpes/Turin | 1877 |
| Becca de Tos | 3,301 | 10,830 | 461 | 1,512 | 45°37′49″N 07°06′24″E | Graian Alps - Central | I/B-07.III-A | Aosta Valley | |
| Monte Argentera | 3,297 | 10,817 | 1,306 | 4,285 | 44°10′41″N 07°18′21″E | Maritime Alps | I/A-02.I-B | Cuneo | 1879 |
| Monte Sobretta | 3,296 | 10,814 | 835 | 2,740 | 46°23′51″N 10°26′13″E | Ortler Alps | II/C-28.I-B | Sondrio | |
| Punta Merciantaira | 3,293 | 10,804 | 496 | 1,627 | 44°51′00″N 06°52′55″E | Cottian Alps - C | I/A-04.II-B | H-Alpes/Turin | 1835 |
| Monte Aiguillette | 3,287 | 10,784 | 472 | 1,549 | 44°41′29″N 07°01′36″E | Cottian Alps - S | I/A-04.I-C | H-Alpes/Cuneo | |
| Punta di Pietra Rossa | 3,283 | 10,771 | 662 | 2,172 | 46°19′29″N 10°26′15″E | Ortler Alps | II/C-28.I-B | Brescia | |
| Rognosa di Sestriere | 3,280 | 10,760 | 575 | 1,886 | 44°56′05″N 06°55′52″E | Cottian Alps - C | I/A-04.II-A | Turin | 1836 |
| Pizzo Dosdè | 3,280 | 10,760 | 308 | 1,010 | 46°24′36″N 10°13′33″E | Livigno Alps | II/A-15.IV-B | Sondrio | 1879 |
| Pizzo Tambò | 3,279 | 10,758 | 1,164 | 3,819 | 46°29′49″N 09°17′00″E | Lepontine Alps | I/B-10.III-D | Grisons/Sondrio | 1828 |
| Hohe Weiße | 3,279 | 10,758 | 384 | 1,260 | 46°44′44″N 11°02′14″E | Ötztal Alps | II/A-16.I-B | S-Tyrol | 1871 |
| Basòdino | 3,272 | 10,735 | 959 | 3,146 | 46°24′41″N 08°28′07″E | Lepontine Alps | I/B-10.II-A | Ticino/V-C-O | 1863 |
| Pointe d'Archeboc | 3,272 | 10,735 | 439 | 1,440 | 45°35′01″N 06°58′49″E | Graian Alps - Central | I/B-07.III-A | Savoie/Aosta Valley | |
| Feuerstein | 3,268 | 10,722 | 428 | 1,404 | 46°58′18″N 11°14′40″E | Stubai Alps | II/A-16.II-A | N-Tyrol/S-Tyrol | 1854 |
| Antelao | 3,264 | 10,709 | 1,735 | 5,692 | 46°27′09″N 12°15′38″E | Dolomites - NE | II/C-31.I-E | Belluno | 1863 |
| Scima da Saoseo | 3,264 | 10,709 | 440 | 1,440 | 46°23′08″N 10°09′29″E | Livigno Alps | II/A-15.IV-B | Grisons/Sondrio | 1894 |
| Hasenöhrl | 3,257 | 10,686 | 375 | 1,230 | 46°32′40″N 10°51′31″E | Ortler Alps | II/C-28.I-A | S-Tyrol | 1895 |
| Penne Blanche | 3,254 | 10,676 | 349 | 1,145 | 45°37′08″N 07°25′37″E | Graian Alps - N | I/B-07.IV-C | Aosta Valley | |
| Berrio Blanc | 3,252 | 10,669 | 736 | 2,415 | 45°45′11″N 06°53′52″E | Mont Blanc massif | I/B-07.III-B | Aosta Valley | |
| Rauhkofel | 3,251 | 10,666 | 593 | 1,946 | 47°04′34″N 12°05′31″E | Zillertal Alps | II/A-17.I-B | N-Tyrol/S-Tyrol | 1853 |
| Wasenhorn | 3,246 | 10,650 | 476 | 1,562 | 46°15′59″N 08°05′08″E | Lepontine Alps | I/B-10.I-A | Valais/V-C-O | 1844 |
| Punta Painale | 3,246 | 10,650 | 413 | 1,355 | 46°15′24″N 09°58′26″E | Bernina Range | II/A-15.III-A | Sondrio | 1885 |
| Tofana di Mezzo | 3,244 | 10,643 | 1,369 | 4,491 | 46°33′04″N 12°03′56″E | Tofane | II/C-31.I-D | Belluno | 1863 |
| Tofana di Dentro | 3,238 | 10,623 | 166 | 545 | 46°33′25.07″N 12°03′50.6″E | Tofane | II/C-31.I-D | Belluno | 1863 |
| Grand Golliat | 3,238 | 10,623 | 368 | 1,207 | 45°51′33″N 07°06′06″E | Grand Combin | I/B-09.I-A | Valais/Aosta Valley | 1879 |
| Ofenhorn | 3,235 | 10,614 | 334 | 1,096 | 46°23′12″N 08°19′07″E | Lepontine Alps | I/B-10.I-A | Valais/V-C-O | 1864 |
| Becca du Merlo | 3,234 | 10,610 | 331 | 1,086 | 45°50′38″N 07°28′14″E | Pennine Alps | I/B-09.II-B | Aosta Valley | |
| Corno di Dosdè | 3,232 | 10,604 | 302 | 991 | 46°24′28″N 10°10′11″E | Livigno Alps | II/A-15.IV-B | Sondrio | 1866 |
| Tofana di Rozes | 3,225 | 10,581 | 664 | 2,178 | 46°32′13″N 12°03′04″E | Tofane | II/C-31.I-D | Belluno | 1864 |
| Monte Gavia | 3,223 | 10,574 | 309 | 1,014 | 46°21′15″N 10°28′21″E | Ortler Alps | II/C-28.I-B | Brescia/Sondrio | 1891 |
| Rocca Bernauda | 3,222 | 10,571 | 682 | 2,238 | 45°06′05″N 06°37′39″E | Massif des Cerces | I/A-04.III-A | H-Alpes/Turin | 1882 |
| Monte Cristallo | 3,221 | 10,568 | 1,416 | 4,646 | 46°34′31″N 12°12′02″E | Cristallo | II/C-31.I-D | Belluno | 1865 |
| Monte Civetta | 3,220 | 10,560 | 1,454 | 4,770 | 46°22′48″N 12°03′12″E | Dolomites - SE | II/C-31.II-A | Belluno | 1860 |
| Monte del Forno | 3,214 | 10,545 | 446 | 1,463 | 46°20′18″N 09°43′29″E | Bregaglia Range | II/A-15.III-B | Grisons/Sondrio | 1876 |
| Scherbadung | 3,211 | 10,535 | 716 | 2,349 | 46°19′27″N 08°13′23″E | Lepontine Alps | I/B-10.I-A | Valais/V-C-O | 1886 |
| Gran Vernel | 3,210 | 10,530 | 314 | 1,030 | 46°26′33″N 11°49′56″E | Dolomites - NW | II/C-31.III-B | Trentino | 1879 |
| Piz Timun | 3,209 | 10,528 | 823 | 2,700 | 46°28′01″N 09°24′34″E | Oberhalbstein Alps | II/A-15.I-A | Grisons/Sondrio | 1884 |
| Sorapiss | 3,205 | 10,515 | 1,085 | 3,560 | 46°30′25″N 12°12′42″E | Dolomites - NE | II/C-31.I-D | Belluno | 1864 |
| Mastaunspitze | 3,200 | 10,500 | 455 | 1,493 | 46°41′37″N 10°48′09″E | Ötztal Alps | II/A-16.I-A | S-Tyrol | 1854 |
| Bortelhorn | 3,193.6 | 10,478 | 430 | 1,410 | 46°17′41″N 08°07′31″E | Lepontine Alps | I/B-10.I-A | Valais/V-C-O | 1869 |
| Rocca Blancia | 3,193 | 10,476 | 328 | 1,076 | 44°29′57″N 06°51′53″E | Cottian Alps - S | I/A-04.I-A | AHP/Cuneo | |
| Vezzana | 3,192 | 10,472 | 1,273 | 4,177 | 46°17′23″N 11°49′49″E | Pala Group | II/C-31.IV-A | Belluno/Trentino | 1872 |
| Spechhorn | 3,189 | 10,463 | 355 | 1,165 | 46°00′44″N 08°00′04″E | Pennine Alps | I/B-09.V-B | Valais/V-C-O | |
| Mont Glacier | 3,186 | 10,453 | 355 | 1,165 | 45°37′53″N 07°32′23″E | Graian Alps - N | I/B-07.IV-C | Aosta Valley | |
| Becca Tey | 3,186 | 10,453 | 301 | 988 | 45°35′10″N 07°05′41″E | Graian Alps - Central | I/B-07.III-A | Aosta Valley | |
| Langkofel | 3,181 | 10,436 | 1,124 | 3,688 | 46°31′30″N 11°44′07″E | Langkofel Group | II/C-31.III-A | S-Tyrol | 1869 |
| Piz Murtaröl | 3,180 | 10,430 | 679 | 2,228 | 46°34′13″N 10°17′15″E | Ortler Alps | II/A-15.V-A | Grisons/Sondrio | 1893 |
| Pointe de Paumont | 3,171 | 10,404 | 378 | 1,240 | 45°08′22″N 06°43′42″E | Cottian Alps - N | I/A-04.III-B | Savoie/Turin | |
| Großem Fensterlekofel | 3,171 | 10,404 | 373 | 1,224 | 46°53′32″N 12°02′35″E | Rieserferner Group | II/A-17.III-A | S-Tyrol | 1877 |
| Monte Pelmo | 3,168 | 10,394 | 1,191 | 3,907 | 46°25′10″N 12°08′06″E | Dolomites - SE | II/C-31.II-A | Belluno | 1857 |
| Piz Albris | 3,166 | 10,387 | 318 | 1,043 | 46°27′51″N 09°57′48″E | Livigno Alps | II/A-15.IV-A | Ticino/Sondrio | |
| Monte Sautron | 3,165 | 10,384 | 300 | 980 | 44°29′12″N 06°52′39″E | Cottian Alps - S | I/A-04.I-A | AHP/Cuneo | 1877 |
| Rosa dei Banchi / Rose des Bancs | 3,164 | 10,381 | 314 | 1,030 | 45°34′38″N 07°31′57″E | Graian Alps - N | I/B-07.IV-B | Aosta Valley/Turin | 1831 |
| Pizzo Stella | 3,163 | 10,377 | 597 | 1,959 | 46°22′54″N 09°25′17″E | Oberhalbstein Alps | II/A-15.I-A | Sondrio | 1859 |
| Monte Vallecetta | 3,156 | 10,354 | 493 | 1,617 | 46°24′43″N 10°24′01″E | Ortler Alps | II/C-28.I-B | Sondrio | 1867 |
| Piz Boè | 3,152 | 10,341 | 939 | 3,081 | 46°30′32″N 11°49′41″E | Sella Group | II/C-31.III-A | Belluno/S-Tyrol/Trentino | 1864 |
| Piz Popena | 3,152 | 10,341 | 344 | 1,129 | 46°34′35″N 12°12′27″E | Cristallo | II/C-31.I-D | Belluno | 1870 |
| Cima Brenta | 3,151 | 10,338 | 1,499 | 4,918 | 46°10′46″N 10°53′59″E | Brenta Dolomites | II/C-28.IV-A | Trentino | 1871 |
| Hohe Gaisl | 3,146 | 10,322 | 1,133 | 3,717 | 46°38′05″N 12°08′37″E | Dolomites - NE | II/C-31.I-B | Belluno/S-Tyrol | 1870 |
| Mont Rafrey | 3,146 | 10,322 | 343 | 1,125 | 45°38′52″N 07°30′39″E | Graian Alps - N | I/B-07.IV-C | Aosta Valley | |
| Dreischusterspitze | 3,145 | 10,318 | 1,393 | 4,570 | 46°40′08″N 12°19′02″E | Sexten Dolomites | II/C-31.I-A | S-Tyrol | 1869 |
| Napfspitze | 3,144 | 10,315 | 587 | 1,926 | 47°03′36″N 12°02′23″E | Zillertal Alps | II/A-17.I-B | N-Tyrol/S-Tyrol | 1880 |
| Piz Tea Fondada | 3,144 | 10,315 | 319 | 1,047 | 46°32′58″N 10°18′29″E | Ortler Alps | II/A-15.V-A | Grisons/Sondrio | 1883 |
| Cime du Gélas | 3,143 | 10,312 | 669 | 2,195 | 44°07′23″N 07°23′05″E | Maritime Alps | I/A-02.I-A | A-Marit/Cuneo | 1864 |
| Monte Cassa del Ferro | 3,140 | 10,300 | 849 | 2,785 | 46°34′43″N 10°12′06″E | Livigno Alps | II/A-15.IV-A | Sondrio | 1883 |
| Cima Tosa | 3,140 | 10,300 | 587 | 1,926 | 46°09′19″N 10°52′14″E | Brenta Dolomites | II/C-28.IV-A | Trentino | 1865 |
| Cime Redasco | 3,139 | 10,299 | 377 | 1,237 | 46°22′10″N 10°18′28″E | Livigno Alps | II/A-15.IV-B | Sondrio | 1896 |
| Durreck | 3,135 | 10,285 | 618 | 2,028 | 46°57′40″N 12°01′44″E | Venediger Group | II/A-17.II-A | S-Tyrol | 1877 |
| Wilde Kreuzspitze | 3,135 | 10,285 | 567 | 1,860 | 46°54′45″N 11°35′36″E | Zillertal Alps | II/A-17.I-C | S-Tyrol | 1852 |
| Pizzo Filone | 3,133 | 10,279 | 332 | 1,089 | 46°27′27″N 10°09′48″E | Livigno Alps | II/A-15.IV-B | Sondrio | |
| Punta Léchaud / Pointe Léchaud | 3,128 | 10,262 | 525 | 1,722 | 45°44′01″N 06°48′51″E | Mont Blanc massif | I/B-07.III-B | Savoie/Aosta Valley | |
| Grohmannspitze | 3,126 | 10,256 | 445 | 1,460 | 46°30′38″N 11°44′01″E | Langkofel Group | II/C-31.III-A | S-Tyrol/Trentino | 1880 |
| Piz Schumbraida | 3,125 | 10,253 | 315 | 1,033 | 46°32′34″N 10°20′18″E | Ortler Alps | II/A-15.V-A | Grisons/Sondrio | 1883 |
| Piz da l'Acqua | 3,118 | 10,230 | 310 | 1,020 | 46°36′40″N 10°08′20″E | Livigno Alps | II/A-15.IV-A | Grisons/Sondrio | 1888 |
| Monte Servin | 3,108 | 10,197 | 333 | 1,093 | 45°15′53″N 07°11′59″E | Graian Alps - SE | I/B-07.I-C | Turin | |
| Pizz Gallagiun (Note: The lowest col between equally high Gletscherhorn and Piz Gallagiun is the 383 m-deep (1,257 ft) Passo de la Prasgnola. They share the 2,694 m (8,839 ft) key col Pass da la Duana.) | 3,107 | 10,194 | 413 | 1,355 | 46°22′01″N 09°29′16″E | Oberhalbstein Alps | II/A-15.I-A | Grisons/Sondrio | 1861 |
| Monte Oronaye | 3,104 | 10,184 | 562 | 1,844 | 44°26′26″N 06°56′06″E | Cottian Alps - S | I/A-04.I-A | AHP/Cuneo | 1883 |
| Große Ohrenspitze | 3,101 | 10,174 | 369 | 1,211 | 46°54′25″N 12°10′39″E | Rieserferner Group | II/A-17.III-A | E-Tyrol/S-Tyrol | 1878 |
| Mont Ouille | 3,099 | 10,167 | 362 | 1,188 | 45°43′54″N 06°51′59″E | Mont Blanc massif | I/B-07.III-B | Aosta Valley | |
| Monte Matto | 3,097 | 10,161 | 577 | 1,893 | 44°13′30″N 07°15′23″E | Maritime Alps | I/A-02.I-B | Cuneo | 1879 |
| Zwölferkofel | 3,094 | 10,151 | 713 | 2,339 | 46°37′09″N 12°21′35″E | Sexten Dolomites | II/C-31.I-A | Belluno/S-Tyrol | 1874 |
| Elferkofel | 3,092 | 10,144 | 661 | 2,169 | 46°38′11″N 12°22′42″E | Sexten Dolomites | II/C-31.I-A | Belluno/S-Tyrol | 1878 |
| Mont-Fallère | 3,061 | 10,043 | 554 | 1,818 | 45°46′32″N 07°11′39″E | Grand Combin | I/B-09.I-B | Aosta Valley | |
| Monte Forcellina | 3,087 | 10,128 | 473 | 1,552 | 46°27′59″N 10°11′55″E | Livigno Alps | II/A-15.IV-B | Sondrio | |
| Cima da Lägh | 3,083 | 10,115 | 422 | 1,385 | 46°22′35″N 09°27′40″E | Oberhalbstein Alps | II/A-15.I-A | Grisons/Sondrio | |
| Mont Néry | 3,076 | 10,092 | 906 | 2,972 | 45°42′57″N 07°49′12″E | Monte Rosa | I/B-09.III-B | Aosta Valley | 1873 |
| Piz Starlex | 3,075 | 10,089 | 779 | 2,556 | 46°39′46″N 10°23′33″E | Sesvenna Alps | II/A-15.V-B | Grisons/S-Tyrol | |
| Piz Sena | 3,075 | 10,089 | 344 | 1,129 | 46°21′11″N 10°06′36″E | Livigno Alps | II/A-15.IV-B | Grisons/Sondrio | 1901 |
| Piz dles Cunturines | 3,064 | 10,052 | 913 | 2,995 | 46°34′33″N 11°58′40″E | Dolomites - NE | II/C-31.I-C | S-Tyrol | 1881 |
| Grabspitze | 3,059 | 10,036 | 415 | 1,362 | 46°56′19″N 11°36′52″E | Zillertal Alps | II/A-17.I-C | S-Tyrol | 1852 |
| Monte Vago | 3,059 | 10,036 | 388 | 1,273 | 46°26′27″N 10°04′44″E | Livigno Alps | II/A-15.IV-B | Sondrio | |
| Sasso Vernale | 3,058 | 10,033 | 356 | 1,168 | 46°25′08″N 11°50′26″E | Marmolada | II/C-31.III-B | Belluno/Trentino | |
| Pizzo Coca | 3,050 | 10,010 | 1,878 | 6,161 | 46°04′18″N 10°00′41″E | Bergamasque Alps | II/C-29.I-A | Bergamo/Sondrio | 1877 |
| Punta Nera | 3,047 | 9,997 | 505 | 1,657 | 45°07′20″N 06°39′31″E | Cottian Alps - N | I/A-04.III-B | Savoie/Turin | |
| Monte Albergian | 3,041 | 9,977 | 428 | 1,404 | 45°00′27″N 06°59′34″E | Cottian Alps - C | I/A-04.II-A | Turin | 1822 |
| Punta Scais (Note: Punta di Scais is a twin peak with Pizzo Redorta, 700 m (2,300 ft) to the south and separated by the 133 m-deep (436 ft) "Passo Scais". They are sometimes given the same height (3,038 m (9,967 ft)). Elsewhere Punta di Scais is 1 or 2 metres (3 ft 3 in or 6 ft 7 in) higher.) | 3,039 | 9,970 | 393 | 1,289 | 46°04′07″N 09°59′04″E | Bergamasque Alps | II/C-29.I-A | Bergamo/Sondrio | 1881 |
| Bric Ghinivert | 3,037 | 9,964 | 347 | 1,138 | 44°57′05″N 06°59′28″E | Cottian Alps - C | I/A-04.II-A | Turin | |
| Pizzo Ligoncio | 3,032 | 9,948 | 506 | 1,660 | 46°14′20″N 09°32′52″E | Bregaglia Range | II/A-15.III-B | Sondrio | |
| Becca de Vlou / Vlouhure | 3,032 | 9,948 | 483 | 1,585 | 45°41′30″N 07°47′32″E | Monte Rosa | I/B-09.III-B | Aosta Valley | |
| Monte Tenibres | 3,031 | 9,944 | 525 | 1,722 | 44°17′02″N 06°58′20″E | Maritime Alps | I/A-02.I-C | A-Marit/Cuneo | 1836 |
| Monte Politri | 3,026 | 9,928 | 313 | 1,027 | 44°59′28″N 07°01′07″E | Cottian Alps - C | I/A-04.II-A | Turin | |
| Corno di Ban | 3,028 | 9,934 | 311 | 1,020 | 46°25′04″N 08°21′40″E | Lepontine Alps | I/B-10.I-A | V-C-O | |
| Sas dles Diesc | 3,026 | 9,928 | 493 | 1,617 | 46°37′20″N 11°57′38″E | Dolomites - NE | II/C-31.I-C | S-Tyrol | 1887 |
| Furchetta (Note: Equally high Sas Rigais and Furcheta are only 600 m (2,000 ft) apart but joined by the 329 m-deep (1,079 ft) Salieresscharte.) | 3,025 | 9,925 | 904 | 2,966 | 46°36′44″N 11°46′24″E | Dolomites - NW | II/C-31.III-A | S-Tyrol | 1878 |
| Sass Rigais | 3,025 | 9,925 | 904 | 2,966 | 46°36′33″N 11°46′00″E | Dolomites - NW | II/C-31.III-A | S-Tyrol | 1878 |
| Piz Corbet | 3,025 | 9,925 | 672 | 2,205 | 46°22′47″N 09°16′49″E | Adula Alps | I/B-10.III-D | Grisons/Sondrio | 1892 |
| Corno Bussola / Mont-de-Boussolaz | 3,024 | 9,921 | 356 | 1,168 | 45°47′44″N 07°44′10″E | Monte Rosa | I/B-09.III-B | Aosta Valley | |
| Wurmaulspitze | 3,022 | 9,915 | 414 | 1,358 | 46°54′50″N 11°38′16″E | Zillertal Alps | II/A-17.I-C | S-Tyrol | |
| Viso Mozzo | 3,019 | 9,905 | 361 | 1,184 | 44°40′29″N 07°06′36″E | Cottian Alps - S | I/A-04.I-C | Cuneo | |
| Cima dell'Uomo | 3,010 | 9,880 | 327 | 1,073 | 46°24′22″N 11°48′30″E | Marmolada | II/C-31.III-B | Trentino | |
| Monte Giove | 3,009 | 9,872 | 516 | 1,693 | 46°21′41″N 08°23′17″E | Lepontine Alps | I/B-10.I-A | V-C-O | |
| Mont Avic | 3,006 | 9,862 | 392 | 1,286 | 45°40′37″N 07°33′17″E | Graian Alps - N | I/B-07.IV-C | Aosta Valley | |
| Kesselkogel | 3,002 | 9,849 | 814 | 2,671 | 46°28′28″N 11°38′37″E | Rosengarten Group | II/C-31.III-B | S-Tyrol/Trentino | 1872 |
| Cima Grande / Große Zinne | 2,999 | 9,839 | 545 | 1,788 | 46°37′08″N 12°18′10″E | Sexten Dolomites | II/C-31.I-A | Belluno/S-Tyrol | 1869 |
| Cima Falkner | 2,999 | 9,839 | 343 | 1,125 | 46°11′36″N 10°54′17″E | Brenta Dolomites | II/C-28.IV-A | Trentino | 1882 |
| Bric Bouchet | 2,997 | 9,833 | 338 | 1,109 | 44°49′19″N 07°01′26″E | Cottian Alps - C | I/A-04.II-A | H-Alpes/Turin | 1876 |
| Cima Fanis di Mezzo | 2,989 | 9,806 | 658 | 2,159 | 46°33′05″N 12°00′51″E | Dolomites - NE | II/C-31.I-C | Belluno/S-Tyrol | 1898 |
| Cima Bagni | 2,983 | 9,787 | 455 | 1,493 | 46°36′55″N 12°24′37″E | Sexten Dolomites | II/C-31.I-A | Belluno | |
| Pala di San Martino | 2,982 | 9,783 | 410 | 1,350 | 46°15′13″N 11°51′03″E | Pala Group | II/C-31.IV-A | Trentino | 1878 |
| Rosengartenspitze | 2,981 | 9,780 | 425 | 1,394 | 46°27′17″N 11°37′15″E | Rosengarten Group | II/C-31.III-B | S-Tyrol/Trentino | 1874 |
| Corno Rosso / Tête rousse / Rothorn / Ròthòre | 2,979 | 9,774 | 499 | 1,637 | 45°46′01″N 07°52′49″E | Monte Rosa | I/B-09.III-C | Aosta Valley/Vercelli | |
| Monte Redival | 2,973 | 9,754 | 356 | 1,168 | 46°18′31″N 10°36′51″E | Ortler Alps | II/C-28.I-A | Trentino | 1878 |
| Cima Ovest / Westliche Zinne | 2,973 | 9,754 | 306 | 1,004 | 46°37′07″N 12°17′50″E | Sexten Dolomites | II/C-31.I-A | Belluno/S-Tyrol | 1879 |
| Chateleysine | 2,971 | 9,747 | 326 | 1,070 | 45°48′05″N 07°24′00″E | Pennine Alps | I/B-09.II-B | Aosta Valley | |
| Grieshorn | 2,969 | 9,741 | 509 | 1,670 | 46°27′05″N 08°23′35″E | Lepontine Alps | I/B-10.I-A | Ticino/V-C-O | |
| Sas dles Nü | 2,968 | 9,738 | 301 | 988 | 46°37′49″N 11°58′52″E | Dolomites - NE | II/C-31.I-C | S-Tyrol | |
| Monte Serottini | 2,967 | 9,734 | 425 | 1,394 | 46°17′27″N 10°20′52″E | Ortler Alps | II/C-28.I-B | Brescia/Sondrio | |
| Haunold | 2,966 | 9,731 | 677 | 2,221 | 46°41′19″N 12°16′39″E | Sexten Dolomites | II/C-31.I-A | S-Tyrol | 1878 |
| Monte Tagliaferro | 2,964 | 9,724 | 640 | 2,100 | 45°52′21″N 07°58′15″E | Monte Rosa | I/B-09.III-C | Vercelli | |
| Marchhorn | 2,962 | 9,718 | 327 | 1,073 | 46°26′55″N 08°27′45″E | Lepontine Alps | I/B-10.II-A | Ticino/V-C-O | |
| Cima Brenta Alta | 2,961 | 9,715 | 341 | 1,119 | 46°09′37″N 10°53′47″E | Brenta Dolomites | II/C-28.IV-A | Trentino | 1880 |
| Cima Giner | 2,957 | 9,701 | 340 | 1,120 | 46°14′14″N 10°43′57″E | Adamello-Presanella Alps | II/C-28.III-B | Trentino | |
| Enciastraia | 2,954 | 9,692 | 310 | 1,020 | 44°22′03″N 06°53′18″E | Maritime Alps | I/A-02.I-C | AHP/Cuneo | |
| Corno di Nefelgiú | 2,951 | 9,682 | 368 | 1,207 | 46°23′44″N 08°22′46″E | Lepontine Alps | I/B-10.I-A | V-C-O | |
| Asta Soprana | 2,950 | 9,680 | 424 | 1,391 | 44°12′12″N 07°18′48″E | Maritime Alps | I/A-02.I-B | Cuneo | |
| Gross Schinhorn | 2,939 | 9,642 | 465 | 1,526 | 46°21′40″N 08°15′39″E | Lepontine Alps | I/B-10.I-A | Valais/V-C-O | |
| Pointe de la Louïe Blanche | 2,939 | 9,642 | 372 | 1,220 | 45°39′40″N 06°54′53″E | Graian Alps - Central | I/B-07.III-B | Savoie/Aosta Valley | |
| Testa Malinvern | 2,938 | 9,639 | 403 | 1,322 | 44°11′56″N 07°11′22″E | Maritime Alps | I/A-02.I-B | A-Marit/Cuneo | 1878 |
| Cime di Plator | 2,937 | 9,636 | 654 | 2,146 | 46°30′54″N 10°16′14″E | Livigno Alps | II/A-15.IV-A | Sondrio | |
| Pietra Grande | 2,937 | 9,636 | 496 | 1,627 | 46°13′53″N 10°53′45″E | Brenta Dolomites | II/C-28.IV-A | Trentino | 1883 |
| Monte Gruf | 2,936 | 9,633 | 446 | 1,463 | 46°17′10″N 09°30′21″E | Bregaglia Range | II/A-15.III-B | Sondrio | |
| Cimon del Froppa | 2,932 | 9,619 | 677 | 2,221 | 46°30′26″N 12°20′26″E | Marmarole | II/C-31.I-E | Belluno | 1872 |
| Monte Pettini | 2,932 | 9,619 | 640 | 2,100 | 46°32′10″N 10°13′39″E | Livigno Alps | II/A-15.IV-B | Sondrio | |
| Monte Palavas | 2,929 | 9,610 | 400 | 1,300 | 44°47′24″N 06°59′59″E | Cottian Alps - C | I/A-04.II-A | H-Alpes/Turin | |
| Cima Bastioni Sud | 2,926 | 9,600 | 554 | 1,818 | 46°29′07″N 12°16′04″E | Marmarole | II/C-31.I-E | Belluno | 1890 |
| Pizzo del Diavolo della Malgina | 2,926 | 9,600 | 330 | 1,080 | 46°05′05″N 10°02′48″E | Bergamo Alps | II/C-29.I-A | Bergamo/Sondrio | |
| Birkenkofel | 2,922 | 9,587 | 385 | 1,263 | 46°40′51″N 12°15′24″E | Sexten Dolomites | II/C-31.I-A | S-Tyrol | 1880 |
| Monte Ruvi / Mont Ruvi | 2,922 | 9,587 | 333 | 1,093 | 45°41′21″N 07°33′52″E | Graian Alps - N | I/B-07.IV-C | Aosta Valley | |
| Monte Ciorneva | 2,918 | 9,573 | 483 | 1,585 | 45°16′06″N 07°15′37″E | Graian Alps - SE | I/B-07.I-C | Turin | |
| Corno di Flavona | 2,918 | 9,573 | 305 | 1,001 | 46°14′44″N 10°53′49″E | Brenta Dolomites | II/C-28.IV-A | Trentino | 1881 |
| Cima Bel Pra | 2,917 | 9,570 | 431 | 1,414 | 46°29′04″N 12°14′28″E | Marmarole | II/C-31.I-E | Belluno | 1880 |
| Pizzo del Diavolo di Tenda | 2,916 | 9,567 | 506 | 1,660 | 46°02′43″N 09°54′29″E | Bergamasque Alps | II/C-29.I-A | Bergamo/Sondrio | 1870 |
| Beco Alto del Piz | 2,912 | 9,554 | 312 | 1,024 | 44°17′56″N 06°58′51″E | Maritime Alps | I/A-02.I-C | Cuneo | |
| Pizzo Diei | 2,906 | 9,534 | 623 | 2,044 | 46°15′53″N 08°14′17″E | Lepontine Alps | I/B-10.I-A | V-C-O | |
| Piz Combul | 2,901 | 9,518 | 313 | 1,027 | 46°13′47″N 10°02′38″E | Bernina Range | II/A-15.III-A | Grisons/Sondrio | |
| Cima Canali | 2,900 | 9,500 | 248 | 814 | 46°14′38″N 11°51′50″E | Dolomites - S | II/C-31.IV-A | Trentino | 1879 |
| Becca di Nona / Pic de Nona | 2,898 | 9,508 | 374 | 1,227 | 45°50′23″N 07°24′58″E | Pennine Alps | I/B-09.II-B | Aosta Valley | 1832 |
| Monte Frisozzo | 2,897 | 9,505 | 609 | 1,998 | 46°01′28″N 10°26′57″E | Adamello-Presanella Alps | II/C-28.III-A | Brescia | 1854 |
| Reinhart | 2,891 | 9,485 | 318 | 1,043 | 47°02′32″N 12°10′47″E | Venediger Group | II/A-17.II-A | S-Tyrol | 1893 |
| Monte Orsiera | 2,890 | 9,480 | 859 | 2,818 | 45°03′50″N 07°06′26″E | Cottian Alps - C | I/A-04.II-A | Turin | |
| Monte Re di Castello | 2,889 | 9,478 | 312 | 1,024 | 46°01′18″N 10°29′00″E | Adamello-Presanella Alps | II/C-28.III-A | Brescia/Trentino | 1854 |
| Cima Cadini | 2,888 | 9,475 | 343 | 1,125 | 46°56′13″N 11°44′22″E | Zillertal Alps | II/A-17.I-C | S-Tyrol | |
| Pizzo Recastello | 2,886 | 9,469 | 373 | 1,224 | 46°03′25″N 10°04′32″E | Bergamasque Alps | II/C-29.I-A | Bergamo | 1876 |
| Monteaviolo | 2,881 | 9,452 | 561 | 1,841 | 46°11′07″N 10°23′55″E | Adamello-Presanella Alps | II/C-28.III-A | Brescia | |
| Cima delle Sasse (Note: Equally high Cima del Sasse & Moiazza Sud are separated by the 363 m-deep (1,191 ft) Forcella delle Sasse) | 2,878 | 9,442 | 402 | 1,319 | 46°21′25″N 12°03′52″E | Dolomites - SE | II/C-31.II-A | Belluno | |
| Moiazza Sud | 2,878 | 9,442 | 402 | 1,319 | 46°20′18″N 12°03′29″E | Dolomites - SE | II/C-31.II-A | Belluno | 1895 |
| Punta Clotesse | 2,878 | 9,442 | 329 | 1,079 | 45°00′26″N 06°44′51″E | Massif des Cerces | I/A-04.III-A | H-Alpes/Turin | |
| Peitlerkofel | 2,875 | 9,432 | 638 | 2,093 | 46°39′32″N 11°49′12″E | Dolomites - NW | II/C-31.III-A | S-Tyrol | 1885 |
| Croda dei Rondoi | 2,873 | 9,426 | 328 | 1,076 | 46°39′08″N 12°16′13″E | Sexten Dolomites | II/C-31.I-A | S-Tyrol | |
| Monte Carbonè | 2,873 | 9,426 | 309 | 1,014 | 44°09′37″N 07°25′50″E | Maritime Alps | I/A-02.I-A | Cuneo | |
| Monte Agnèr | 2,872 | 9,423 | 542 | 1,778 | 46°16′35″N 11°57′10″E | Pala Group | II/C-31.IV-A | Belluno | 1875 |
| Tête des Vieux (Note: A point 2978 on the Italian topographic map, between Tête des Vieux (2,873 m, 9,426 ft) and Têtes de Jeunes (2,785 m, 9,137 ft), has been copied by the Swiss and French topographic maps, but is not supported by the SRTM data nor by the topology of the mountain. It probably was a typo, perhaps for 2778.) | 2,872 | 9,423 | 302 | 991 | 45°45′32″N 06°56′06″E | Mont Blanc massif | I/B-07.III-B | Aosta Valley | |
| Kolbenspitze | 2,868 | 9,409 | 367 | 1,204 | 46°46′22″N 11°08′52″E | Ötztal Alps | II/A-16.I-B | S-Tyrol | |
| Punta Cornour | 2,868 | 9,409 | 417 | 1,368 | 44°51′02″N 07°05′35″E | Cottian Alps - C | I/A-04.II-A | Turin | 1836 |
| Pala di Meduce | 2,864 | 9,396 | 304 | 997 | 46°30′07″N 12°17′51″E | Marmarole | II/C-31.I-E | Belluno | 1890 |
| Wandfluhhorn | 2,863 | 9,393 | 452 | 1,483 | 46°20′41″N 08°27′51″E | Lepontine Alps | I/B-10.II-A | Ticino/V-C-O | |
| Cima de Barna | 2,862 | 9,390 | 314 | 1,030 | 46°25′14″N 09°15′49″E | Adula Alps | I/B-10.III-D | Grisons/Sondrio | |
| Cima Piccola / Kleine Zinne | 2,857 | 9,373 | 204 | 669 | 46°37′9.59″N 12°18′23.08″E | Sexten Dolomites | II/C-31.I-A.4 | Belluno/S-Tyrol | |
| Piz di Sassiglion | 2,855 | 9,367 | 313 | 1,027 | 46°19′22″N 10°06′45″E | Livigno Alps | II/A-15.IV-B | Grisons/Sondrio | |
| Cima Ciantiplagna | 2,849 | 9,347 | 673 | 2,208 | 45°04′20″N 07°00′48″E | Cottian Alps - C | I/A-04.II-A | Turin | |
| Croda Granda | 2,849 | 9,347 | 492 | 1,614 | 46°14′55″N 11°55′43″E | Pala Group | II/C-31.IV-A | Belluno | 1883 |
| Cima d'Asta | 2,847 | 9,341 | 939 | 3,081 | 46°10′36″N 11°36′19″E | Fiemme Alps | II/C-31.V-B | Trentino | 1816 |
| Punta Nera | 2,847 | 9,341 | 431 | 1,414 | 46°30′59″N 12°11′30″E | Dolomites - NE | II/C-31.I-D | Belluno | 1876 |
| Cima del Desenigo | 2,845 | 9,334 | 369 | 1,211 | 46°12′06″N 09°33′42″E | Bregaglia Range | II/A-15.III-B | Sondrio | |
| Punta Charrà | 2,844 | 9,331 | 363 | 1,191 | 45°01′17″N 06°42′37″E | Massif des Cerces | I/A-04.III-A | H-Alpes/Turin | |
| Latemar | 2,842 | 9,324 | 1,097 | 3,599 | 46°22′52″N 11°34′31″E | Fiemme Alps | II/C-31.V-A | S-Tyrol/Trentino | 1885 |
| Dürrenstein | 2,839 | 9,314 | 880 | 2,890 | 46°40′21″N 12°11′07″E | Dolomites - NE | II/C-31.I-B | S-Tyrol | |
| Cima Cadin di San Lucano | 2,839 | 9,314 | 663 | 2,175 | 46°34′39″N 12°17′17″E | Cadini di Misurina | II/C-31.I-A | Belluno | |
| Kärlskopf | 2,836 | 9,304 | 631 | 2,070 | 46°53′19″N 12°14′10″E | Villgraten Mountains | II/A-17.III-B | E-Tyrol/S-Tyrol | |
| Rocca la Meja | 2,831 | 9,288 | 437 | 1,434 | 44°23′54″N 07°04′08″E | Cottian Alps - S | I/A-04.I-A | Cuneo | |
| Graunock | 2,827 | 9,275 | 419 | 1,375 | 46°53′10″N 11°47′20″E | Zillertal Alps | II/A-17.I-B | S-Tyrol | |
| Monfandì | 2,820 | 9,250 | 405 | 1,329 | 45°31′19″N 07°37′10″E | Graian Alps - N | I/B-07.IV-B | Turin | |
| Dosso Resaccio | 2,814 | 9,232 | 519 | 1,703 | 46°30′04″N 10°13′12″E | Livigno Alps | II/A-15.IV-B | Sondrio | |
| Sass Maòr | 2,814 | 9,232 | 371 | 1,217 | 46°13′57″N 11°50′53″E | Dolomites - S | II/C-31.IV-A | Trentino | 1875 |
| Cima delle Lose | 2,813 | 9,229 | 352 | 1,155 | 44°22′20″N 06°55′30″E | Maritime Alps | I/A-02.I-C | Cuneo | |
| Frate della Meia | 2,812 | 9,226 | 387 | 1,270 | 45°45′32″N 07°55′27″E | Monte Rosa | I/B-09.III-C | Vercelli | |
| Seekofel | 2,810 | 9,220 | 478 | 1,568 | 46°40′30″N 12°04′21″E | Dolomites - NE | II/C-31.I-B | Belluno/S-Tyrol | |
| Monte Campellio | 2,809 | 9,216 | 315 | 1,033 | 46°03′05″N 10°28′38″E | Adamello-Presanella Alps | II/C-28.III-A | Brescia/Trentino | |
| Cima di Ball | 2,802 | 9,193 | 352 | 1,155 | 46°14′35″N 11°50′40″E | Dolomites - S | II/C-31.IV-A | Trentino | 1869 |
| Corno Mud | 2,802 | 9,193 | 317 | 1,040 | 45°53′04″N 07°57′50″E | Monte Rosa | I/B-09.III-C | Vercelli | |
| Rollspitze | 2,800 | 9,200 | 588 | 1,929 | 46°56′47″N 11°30′28″E | Zillertal Alps | II/A-17.I-A | S-Tyrol | |
| Col Bechei | 2,794 | 9,167 | 622 | 2,041 | 46°36′28″N 12°02′40″E | Dolomites - NE | II/C-31.I-C | Belluno/S-Tyrol | |
| Pizzo Quadro | 2,793 | 9,163 | 470 | 1,540 | 46°17′55″N 08°25′05″E | Lepontine Alps | I/B-10.II-A | Ticino/V-C-O | |
| Punta Ciamberline | 2,792 | 9,160 | 325 | 1,066 | 44°09′56″N 07°21′29″E | Maritime Alps | I/A-02.I-B | Cuneo | |
| Muntejela de Senes | 2,787 | 9,144 | 456 | 1,496 | 46°40′18″N 12°01′06″E | Dolomites - NE | II/C-31.I-B | S-Tyrol | |
| Hirzer | 2,781 | 9,124 | 751 | 2,464 | 46°44′14″N 11°16′36″E | Sarntal Alps | II/A-16.III-A | S-Tyrol | |
| Coglians | 2,780 | 9,120 | 1,144 | 3,753 | 46°36′25″N 12°52′59″E | Carnic Alps | II/C-33.I-A | Carinthia/Udine | 1865 |
| Mont de Corni | 2,779 | 9,117 | 315 | 1,033 | 45°34′15″N 07°38′09″E | Graian Alps - N | I/B-07.IV-B | Aosta Valley/Turin | |
| Monte Cassorso | 2,776 | 9,108 | 339 | 1,112 | 44°25′04″N 07°01′05″E | Cottian Alps - S | I/A-04.I-A | Cuneo | |
| Punta Lunella | 2,772 | 9,094 | 471 | 1,545 | 45°11′50″N 07°12′59″E | Graian Alps - Central | I/B-07.I-A | Turin | 1873 |
| Ehrenspitze | 2,756 | 9,042 | 347 | 1,138 | 46°45′50″N 11°04′40″E | Ötztal Alps | II/A-16.I-B | S-Tyrol | |
| Roche de l'Abisse/Rocca dell'Abisso | 2,755 | 9,039 | 492 | 1,614 | 44°08′37″N 07°30′18″E | Maritime Alps | I/A-02.I-A | A-Marit/Cuneo | 1832 |
| Cima di Cece | 2,754 | 9,035 | 736 | 2,415 | 46°15′39″N 11°41′02″E | Fiemme Alps | II/C-31.V-B | Trentino | |
| Monte Telenek | 2,754 | 9,035 | 440 | 1,440 | 46°05′33″N 10°10′45″E | Bergamasque Alps | II/C-29.I-A | Sondrio | |
| Jôf dal Montâs | 2,753 | 9,032 | 1,597 | 5,240 | 46°26′09″N 13°26′01″E | Julian Alps | II/C-34.I-A | Udine | 1877 |
| Cima di Quaira / Karspitze | 2,752 | 9,029 | 303 | 994 | 46°18′31″N 10°36′51″E | Ortler Alps | II/C-28.I-A | S-Tyrol/Trentino | |
| Alplerspitz / Mardatsch | 2,748 | 9,016 | 321 | 1,053 | 46°45′42″N 11°18′04″E | Sarntal Alps | II/A-16.III-A | S-Tyrol | |
| Corno del lago / Pic du lac / Siahuare | 2,747 | 9,012 | 409 | 1,342 | 45°40′15″N 07°46′59″E | Monte Rosa | I/B-09.III-B | Aosta Valley | |
| Hochwart | 2,746 | 9,009 | 308 | 1,010 | 46°47′27″N 11°19′08″E | Sarntal Alps | II/A-16.III-A | S-Tyrol | |
| Cima Bocche | 2,745 | 9,006 | 714 | 2,343 | 46°21′15″N 11°45′08″E | Dolomites - NW | II/C-31.III-B | Trentino | |
| Jakobsspitze | 2,745 | 9,006 | 531 | 1,742 | 46°45′47″N 11°29′30″E | Sarntal Alps | II/A-16.III-A | S-Tyrol | |
| Cima Carnera | 2,741 | 8,993 | 319 | 1,047 | 45°51′18″N 07°58′13″E | Monte Rosa | I/B-09.III-C | Vercelli | |
| Monte Borga | 2,731 | 8,960 | 325 | 1,066 | 46°05′35″N 10°12′30″E | Bergamasque Alps | II/C-29.I-A | Sondrio | |
| Sas de Mezdi / La Mesola | 2,727 | 8,947 | 488 | 1,601 | 46°28′19″N 11°52′39″E | Dolomites - NW | II/C-31.III-B | Belluno/Trentino | |
| Pizzo di Claro | 2,727 | 8,947 | 361 | 1,184 | 46°17′45″N 09°03′20″E | Adula Alps | I/B-10.III-B | Grisons/Ticino | |
| Pizzo di Prata | 2,727 | 8,947 | 352 | 1,155 | 46°16′39″N 09°27′20″E | Bregaglia Range | II/A-15.III-B | Sondrio | |
| Weiße Wand | 2,722 | 8,930 | 315 | 1,033 | 46°56′45″N 11°48′49″E | Zillertal Alps | II/A-17.I-C | S-Tyrol | |
| Monte Zerbion / Mont Dzerbion | 2,720 | 8,920 | 306 | 1,004 | 45°47′18″N 07°39′50″E | Monte Rosa | I/B-09.III-B | Aosta Valley | |
| Cima Ambrizzola | 2,715 | 8,907 | 610 | 2,000 | 46°28′45″N 12°05′53″E | Dolomites - NE | II/C-31.I-D | Belluno | 1884 |
| Colàc | 2,715 | 8,907 | 377 | 1,237 | 46°26′29″N 11°46′57″E | Dolomites - NW | II/C-31.III-B | Trentino | |
| Pizzo Straciugo | 2,713 | 8,901 | 335 | 1,099 | 46°07′56″N 08°07′15″E | Pennine Alps | I/B-09.V-B | Valais/V-C-O | |
| Croda da Campo | 2,712 | 8,898 | 365 | 1,198 | 46°35′22″N 12°26′03″E | Sexten Dolomites | II/C-31.I-A | Belluno | |
| Coston di Slavaci | 2,708 | 8,885 | 315 | 1,033 | 46°15′44″N 11°43′01″E | Fiemme Alps | II/C-31.V-B | Trentino | |
| Cima dei Preti | 2,706 | 8,878 | 1,420 | 4,660 | 46°20′33″N 12°25′15″E | Carnic Prealps | II/C-33.III-A | Bell./Pordenone | 1874 |
| Penser Weißhorn | 2,705 | 8,875 | 458 | 1,503 | 46°48′07″N 11°23′44″E | Sarntal Alps | II/A-16.III-A | S-Tyrol | 1822 |
| Pizzo Montalto | 2,705 | 8,875 | 395 | 1,296 | 46°05′51″N 08°07′59″E | Pennine Alps | I/B-09.V-B | V-C-O | |
| Monte Fraiteve | 2,702 | 8,865 | 403 | 1,322 | 44°58′38″N 06°51′41″E | Cottian Alps - C | I/A-04.II-A | Turin | |
| Cima Iuribrutto | 2,697 | 8,848 | 316 | 1,037 | 46°21′33″N 11°45′55″E | Dolomites - NW | II/C-31.III-B | Trentino | |
| Monte Peralba | 2,694 | 8,839 | 725 | 2,379 | 46°37′46″N 12°43′10″E | Carnic Alps | II/C-33.I-A | Belluno | 1854 |
| Monte Cavallino | 2,689 | 8,822 | 595 | 1,952 | 46°40′31″N 12°31′28″E | Carnic Alps | II/C-33.I-A | E-Tyrol/Belluno | 1898 |
| Cima del Serraglio | 2,685 | 8,809 | 350 | 1,150 | 46°35′34″N 10°14′32″E | Ortler Alps | II/A-15.V-A | Grisons/Sondrio | |
| Mangart | 2,679 | 8,789 | 1,067 | 3,501 | 46°26′22″N 13°39′17″E | Julian Alps | II/C-34.I-C | Udine/Slovenia | 1794 |
| Punta Tempesta | 2,679 | 8,789 | 309 | 1,014 | 44°25′19″N 07°08′18″E | Cottian Alps - S | I/A-04.I-A | Cuneo | |
| Cima di Santa Maria | 2,678 | 8,786 | 436 | 1,430 | 46°12′46″N 10°57′03″E | Brenta Dolomites | II/C-28.IV-A | Trentino | |
| Piz della Forcola | 2,675 | 8,776 | 449 | 1,473 | 46°18′59″N 09°17′36″E | Adula Alps | I/B-10.III-D | Grisons/Sondrio | |
| Stübele / Stubele | 2,671 | 8,763 | 384 | 1,260 | 46°28′04″N 10°56′12″E | Ortler Alps | II/C-28.I-A | S-Tyrol/Trentino | |
| Sas Ciampac/Ciampatsch | 2,671 | 8,763 | 305 | 1,001 | 46°33′47″N 11°50′07″E | Dolomites - NW | II/C-31.III-A | S-Tyrol | |
| Monte Duranno (Note: Commonly given a height of 2,652 m (8,701 ft). This is the height of the top of the north face. The true summit is 100 m (330 ft) SSE.) | 2,668 | 8,753 | 510 | 1,670 | 46°19′44″N 12°24′10″E | Carnic Prealps | II/C-33.III-A | Belluno/Pordenone | 1874 |
| Jôf Fuart | 2,666 | 8,747 | 528 | 1,732 | 46°25′50″N 13°29′29″E | Julian Alps | II/C-34.I-A | Udine | |
| Monte Bruffione | 2,665 | 8,743 | 350 | 1,150 | 45°56′32″N 10°29′29″E | Adamello-Presanella Alps | II/C-28.III-A | Brescia/Trentino | |
| Monte Cernera | 2,664 | 8,740 | 304 | 997 | 46°28′08″N 12°03′30″E | Dolomites - NE | II/C-31.I-D | Belluno | |
| Corno di Fana | 2,663 | 8,737 | 337 | 1,106 | 46°47′02″N 12°17′03″E | Villgraten Mountains | II/A-17.III-B | E-Tyrol/S-Tyrol | |
| Pizzo Giezza | 2,658 | 8,720 | 555 | 1,821 | 46°10′45″N 08°11′48″E | Pennine Alps | I/B-09.V-B | V-C-O | |
| Ilmenspitze | 2,656 | 8,714 | 312 | 1,024 | 46°28′55″N 10°57′50″E | Ortler Alps | II/C-28.I-A | S-Tyrol/Trentino | |
| Sommet du Guiau | 2,654 | 8,707 | 442 | 1,450 | 45°01′12″N 06°40′25″E | Massif des Cerces | I/A-04.III-A | H-Alpes/Turin | |
| Punta Marguareis | 2,650 | 8,690 | 779 | 2,556 | 44°10′26″N 07°41′04″E | Ligurian Alps | I/A-01.II-B | A-Marit/Cuneo | |
| Averau | 2,649 | 8,691 | 413 | 1,355 | 46°30′03″N 12°02′13″E | Dolomites - NE | II/C-31.I-D | Belluno | 1874 |
| Monte Mongioie | 2,631 | 8,632 | 459 | 1,506 | 44°10′30″N 07°47′08″E | Ligurian Alps | I/A-01.II-B | Cuneo | |
| Vedetta Alta | 2,627 | 8,619 | 440 | 1,440 | 46°30′42″N 10°59′59″E | Ortler Alps | II/C-28.I-A | S-Tyrol | |
| Monte Pradella | 2,626 | 8,615 | 348 | 1,142 | 45°59′32″N 09°51′02″E | Bergamasque Alps | II/C-29.I-A | Bergamo | |
| Cima d'Auta Orientale | 2,624 | 8,609 | 312 | 1,024 | 46°24′02″N 11°53′10″E | Dolomites - NW | II/C-31.III-B | Belluno | |
| Monte Stelle delle Sute | 2,616 | 8,583 | 550 | 1,800 | 46°12′39″N 11°32′00″E | Fiemme Alps | II/C-31.V-B | Trentino | |
| Pizzo dell'Alpe Gelato | 2,613 | 8,573 | 357 | 1,171 | 46°14′59″N 08°26′39″E | Lepontine Alps | I/B-10.II-A | Ticino/V-C-O | |
| Monte le Stelière | 2,612 | 8,570 | 301 | 988 | 44°15′57″N 07°06′26″E | Maritime Alps | I/A-02.I-C | Cuneo | |
| Monte Legnone | 2,609 | 8,560 | 624 | 2,047 | 46°05′41″N 09°24′53″E | Bergamasque Alps | II/C-29.I-B | Lecco/Sondrio | |
| Cima del Rouss | 2,604 | 8,543 | 381 | 1,250 | 44°19′16″N 07°00′00″E | Maritime Alps | I/A-02.I-C | Cuneo | |
| Campanile Ciastelin | 2,602 | 8,537 | 395 | 1,296 | 46°30′39″N 12°22′38″E | Dolomites - NE | II/C-31.I-E | Belluno | 1890 |
| Becco di Mezzodì | 2,602 | 8,537 | 325 | 1,066 | 46°28′00″N 12°06′52″E | Dolomites - NE | II/C-31.I-D | Belluno | 1872 |
| Monte Cabianca | 2,601 | 8,533 | 312 | 1,024 | 46°00′36″N 09°52′01″E | Bergamasque Alps | II/C-29.I-A | Bergamo | |
| Monte Mars | 2,600 | 8,500 | 409 | 1,342 | 45°38′00″N 07°54′55″E | Biellese Alps | I/B-09.IV-A | Aosta Valley/Biella | |
| Gametzalpenkopf | 2,594 | 8,510 | 306 | 1,004 | 46°41′21″N 12°06′32″E | Dolomites - NE | II/C-31.I-B | S-Tyrol | |
| Monte Forno / Monte Gorio | 2,593 | 8,507 | 339 | 1,112 | 46°17′43″N 08°19′25″E | Lepontine Alps | I/B-10.I-A | V-C-O | |
| Kanin | 2,587 | 8,488 | 1,397 | 4,583 | 46°21′36″N 13°26′18″E | Julian Alps | II/C-34.I-B | Udine/Slovenia | |
| Monte Terza Grande | 2,586 | 8,484 | 1,277 | 4,190 | 46°31′37″N 12°37′17″E | Carnic Alps | II/C-33.I-C | Belluno | |
| Monte Cridola | 2,581 | 8,468 | 538 | 1,765 | 46°25′35″N 12°29′12″E | Carnic Prealps | II/C-33.III-A | Belluno | 1884 |
| Hochspitz /M. Vancomun | 2,581 | 8,468 | 303 | 994 | 46°39′26″N 12°40′07″E | Carnic Alps | II/C-33.I-A | E-Tyrol/Belluno | |
| Plose | 2,576 | 8,451 | 713 | 2,339 | 46°41′23″N 11°45′47″E | Dolomites - NW | II/C-31.III-A | S-Tyrol | |
| Cima delle Buse | 2,574 | 8,445 | 318 | 1,043 | 46°11′10″N 11°29′53″E | Fiemme Alps | II/C-31.V-B | Trentino | |
| Torrione dei Longerin | 2,571 | 8,435 | 536 | 1,759 | 46°37′45″N 12°33′41″E | Carnic Alps | II/C-33.I-A | Belluno | |
| Setsas | 2,571 | 8,435 | 403 | 1,322 | 46°31′10″N 11°57′27″E | Dolomites - NE | II/C-31.I-C | Belluno | |
| Maurerkopf | 2,567 | 8,422 | 352 | 1,155 | 46°42′46″N 12°02′02″E | Dolomites - NE | II/C-31.I-B | S-Tyrol | |
| Schiara | 2,565 | 8,415 | 964 | 3,163 | 46°13′48″N 12°10′56″E | Dolomites - SE | II/C-31.II-B | Belluno | |
| Monte Bo | 2,556 | 8,386 | 616 | 2,021 | 45°42′51″N 07°59′56″E | Biellese Alps | I/B-09.IV-A | Biella | |
| Wolayer Seekopf / Monte Capolago | 2,554 | 8,379 | 585 | 1,919 | 46°36′22″N 12°51′39″E | Carnic Alps | II/C-33.I-A | Carinthia/Udine | |
| Pizzo Tre Signori | 2,554 | 8,379 | 462 | 1,516 | 46°00′43″N 09°31′42″E | Bergamasque Alps | II/C-29.I-B | Bergamo/Lecco/Sondrio | |
| Modeon del Buinz | 2,554 | 8,379 | 313 | 1,027 | 46°25′00″N 13°28′16″E | Julian Alps | II/C-34.I-A | Udine | |
| Tàmer Piccolo | 2,550 | 8,370 | 846 | 2,776 | 46°18′38″N 12°07′19″E | Dolomites - SE | II/C-31.II-B | Belluno | 1892 |
| Concarena | 2,549 | 8,363 | 721 | 2,365 | 46°00′39″N 10°16′48″E | Bergamasque Prealps | II/C-29.II-C | Bergamo | |
| Monte Brentoni | 2,548 | 8,360 | 1,017 | 3,337 | 46°30′46″N 12°33′57″E | Carnic Alps | II/C-33.I-C | Belluno | |
| Monfalcon di Montanaia | 2,548 | 8,360 | 499 | 1,637 | 46°24′16″N 12°29′10″E | Carnic Prealps | II/C-33.III-A | Belluno/Pordenone | |
| Sass de Mura | 2,547 | 8,356 | 1,178 | 3,865 | 46°09′49″N 11°55′31″E | Dolomites - S | II/C-31.IV-B | Belluno/Trentino | 1881 |
| Monte Cresto / Mont Crest | 2,546 | 8,353 | 327 | 1,073 | 45°40′51″N 07°54′36″E | Biellese Alps | I/B-09.IV-A | Aosta Valley/Biella | |
| Monte Talvena | 2,542 | 8,340 | 602 | 1,975 | 46°15′58″N 12°09′21″E | Dolomites - SE | II/C-31.II-B | Belluno | |
| Pizzo Cavregasco | 2,535 | 8,317 | 334 | 1,096 | 46°14′22″N 09°16′35″E | Adula Alps | I/B-10.III-D | Como/Sondrio | |
| Cima Quarazza | 2,530 | 8,300 | 413 | 1,355 | 46°07′47″N 11°34′12″E | Fiemme Alps | II/C-31.V-B | Trentino | |
| Cima Coltorondo | 2,530 | 8,300 | 350 | 1,150 | 46°15′21″N 11°38′17″E | Fiemme Alps | II/C-31.V-B | Trentino | |
| Presolana | 2,521 | 8,271 | 725 | 2,379 | 45°57′24″N 10°03′19″E | Bergamasque Prealps | II/C-29.II-C | Bergamo | 1870 |
| Monte delle Scale | 2,521 | 8,271 | 580 | 1,900 | 46°30′09″N 10°19′36″E | Livigno Alps | II/A-15.IV-A | Sondrio | |
| Steinwand / Creta Verde | 2,520 | 8,270 | 509 | 1,670 | 46°38′34″N 12°47′32″E | Carnic Alps | II/C-33.I-A | Carinthia/Udine | |
| Monte Seleron | 2,519 | 8,264 | 458 | 1,503 | 46°06′00″N 09°43′44″E | Bergamasque Alps | II/C-29.I-A | Sondrio | |
| Cima Busa Alta | 2,513 | 8,245 | 331 | 1,086 | 46°14′59″N 11°36′34″E | Fiemme Alps | II/C-31.V-B | Trentino | |
| Pizzo Arera | 2,512 | 8,241 | 691 | 2,267 | 45°56′05″N 09°48′57″E | Bergamasque Prealps | II/C-29.II-B | Bergamo | |
| Pizzo Alto | 2,512 | 8,241 | 320 | 1,050 | 46°04′39″N 09°27′24″E | Bergamasque Alps | II/C-29.I-B | Lecco/Sondrio | |
| Villanderer Berg | 2,509 | 8,232 | 426 | 1,398 | 46°39′31″N 11°25′08″E | Sarntal Alps | II/A-16.III-A | S-Tyrol | |
| Cima di Sanson | 2,503 | 8,212 | 696 | 2,283 | 46°20′04″N 11°55′41″E | Dolomites - S | II/C-31.IV-A | Belluno | |
| Pizzo Ledu | 2,503 | 8,212 | 375 | 1,230 | 46°13′57″N 09°19′18″E | Adula Alps | I/B-10.III-D | Como/Sondrio | |
| Castello di Moschesin | 2,499 | 8,199 | 314 | 1,030 | 46°17′50″N 12°07′58″E | Dolomites - SE | II/C-31.II-B | Belluno | 1885 |
| Piz di Sagron | 2,486 | 8,156 | 349 | 1,145 | 46°10′33″N 11°55′42″E | Dolomites - S | II/C-31.IV-B | Belluno/Trentino | |
| Monte Armetta | 1,739 | 5,705 | 805 | 2,641 | 44°08′09″N 7°56′19″E | Ligurian Alps | | | |
| Mottarone | 1,491 | 4,892 | 1,130 | 3,710 | 45°52′49″N 08°27′04″E | Pennine Alps | | Verbano-Cusio-Ossola/Novara | |
| Becca di Nana | 3,010 | 9,880 | 235 | 771 | 45°50′57″N 7°41′05″E | Pennine Alps | | Aosta Valley | |

=== Apennines ===
| Mountain | Height | | Drop | | Coordinates | Province | Range | First ascent |
| Mountain | m | ft | m | ft | Coordinates | Province | Range | First ascent |
|---|---|---|---|---|---|---|---|---|
| Corno Grande | 2,912 | 9,554 | 2,456 | 8,058 | 42°28′12″N 13°34′02″E | Teramo and L'Aquila | Apennines | 1573 |
| Monte Amaro | 2,795 | 9,170 | 1,812 | 5,945 | 42°5′N 14°5′E | Pescara and L'Aquila | Apennines | |
| Monte Velino | 2,486 | 8,156 | 1,370 | 4,490 | 42°9′N 13°23′E | L'Aquila | Apennines | |
| Monte Vettore | 2,476 | 8,123 | 1,470 | 4,820 | 42°50′N 13°17′E | Ascoli Piceno | Apennines | |
| Monte Gorzano | 2,458 | 8,064 | 1,170 | 3,840 | 42°37′N 13°24′E | Rieti and Teramo | Apennines | |
| Monte Sirente | 2,348 | 7,703 | 990 | 3,250 | 42°9′N 13°37′E | L'Aquila | Apennines | |
| Monte Greco | 2,285 | 7,497 | 990 | 3,250 | 41°48′N 14°0′E | L'Aquila | Apennines | |
| Serra Dolcedorme | 2,267 | 7,438 | 1,715 | 5,627 | 39°54′N 16°13′E | Potenza and Cosenza | Apennines | |
| Monte Terminillo | 2,216 | 7,270 | 1,170 | 3,840 | 42°28′N 13°0′E | Rieti | Apennines | |
| Monte Cimone | 2,165 | 7,103 | 1,577 | 5,174 | 44°12′N 10°42′E | Modena | Apennines | |
| Monte Viglio | 2,156 | 7,073 | 1,410 | 4,630 | 41°53′N 13°23′E | L'Aquila | Apennines | |
| Monte Cusna | 2,120 | 6,960 | | | 44°17′N 10°23′E | Reggio Emilia | Apennines | |
| Monte Miletto | 2,050 | 6,730 | 1,310 | 4,300 | 41°27′N 14°22′E | Caserta and Isernia | Apennines | |
| Monte Sirino | 2,005 | 6,578 | 1,150 | 3,770 | 40°8′N 15°50′E | Potenza | Apennines | |
| Montalto | 1,956 | 6,417 | 1,710 | 5,610 | 38°10′N 15°55′E | Calabria | Aspromonte | |
| Monte Pisanino | 1,946 | 6,385 | 1,170 | 3,840 | 44°8′N 10°13′E | Lucca | Apennines | |
| Botte Donato | 1,928 | 6,325 | 1,310 | 4,300 | 39°17′N 16°27′E | Cosenza | Apennines | |
| Monte Alpi | 1,900 | 6,200 | | | 40°07′N 15°58′E | | Apennines | |
| Cervati | 1,898 | 6,227 | 1,350 | 4,430 | 40°17′N 15°29′E | Salerno | Apennines | |
| Cervialto | 1,809 | 5,935 | 1,130 | 3,710 | 40°47′N 15°8′E | Avellino | Monti Picentini | |
| Monte Maggiorasca | 1,799 | 5,902 | 939 | 3,081 | 44°33′N 9°29′E | Genoa and Parma | Ligurian Apennines | |
| Monte Amiata | 1,738 | 5,702 | 1,490 | 4,890 | 42°53′N 11°37′E | Grosseto and Siena | Pre-Apennines | |
| Monte Lesima | 1,724 | 5,656 | 848 | 2,782 | 44°40′N 09°15′E | Piacenza | Apennines | |
| Monte Catria | 1,701 | 5,581 | 1,066 | 3,497 | 43°28′N 12°42′E | Pesaro and Urbino | Apennines | |
| Monte Cairo | 1,669 | 5,476 | 1,150 | 3,770 | 41°33′N 13°46′E | Frosinone | Apennines | |
| Monte Avella | 1,598 | 5,243 | 1,150 | 3,770 | 40°59′N 14°41′E | Avellino and Benevento | Apennines | |
| Monte Semprevisa | 1,536 | 5,039 | 1,230 | 4,040 | 41°34′N 13°6′E | Latina and Frosinone | Apennines | |
| Monte Petrella | 1,535 | 5,036 | 1,370 | 4,490 | 41°19′N 13°40′E | Latina | Apennines | |
| Monte San Vicino | 1,469 | 4,820 | 1,090 | 3,580 | 43°20′N 13°4′E | Macerata | Apennines | |
| Monte Sant'Angelo a Tre Pizzi | 1,444 | 4,738 | 1,250 | 4,100 | 40°39′N 14°30′E | Naples and Salerno | Apennines | |
| Monte Fumaiolo | 1,407 | 4,616 | 990 | 3,250 | 43°47′21″N 12°4′18″E | L'Aquila | Apennines | |
| Monte Taburno | 1,394 | 4,573 | 1,110 | 3,640 | 41°6′N 14°36′E | Benevento | Apennines | |
| Mount Somma | 1,332 | 4,370 | | | 40°49′N 14°26′E | Naples | Pre-Apennines | |
| Monte Beigua | 1,287 | 4,222 | | | 44°26′00″N 08°33′55″E | | Ligurian Apennines | |
| Monte Faito | 1,131 | 3,711 | | | 40°39′N 14°31′E | Naples | Pre-Apennines | |
| Vesuvius | 1,281 | 4,203 | 1,230 | 4,040 | 40°49′N 14°26′E | Naples | Apennines | |
| Roccamonfina | 1,005 | 3,297 | | | 41°18′N 13°58′E | Campania | Pre-Apennines | |
| Monte Serra | 917 | 3,009 | | | 43°45′N 10°33′E | Pisa | Pre-Apennines | |
| Termino | | | | | | | Monti Picentini | |
| Polveracchio | | | | | | | Monti Picentini | |
| Monte Acellica | | | | | | | Monti Picentini | |
| Pizzo San Michele | | | | | | | Monti Picentini | |

=== Sicily ===
| Mountain | Height | | Drop | | Coordinates | Range | Province | First ascent |
| Mountain | m | ft | m | ft | Coordinates | Range | Province | First ascent |
|---|---|---|---|---|---|---|---|---|
| Etna | 3,329 | 10,922 | 3,329 | 10,922 | 37°45′N 15°0′E | free standing | Catania | |
| Pizzo Carbonara | 1,979 | 6,493 | 1,196 | 3,924 | 37°54′N 14°2′E | Madonie | Palermo | |
| Rocca Busambra | 1,601 | 5,253 | 1,030 | 3,380 | 37°51′N 13°24′E | Monti Sicani | Palermo | |
| Monte Soro | 1,857 | 6,093 | 970 | 3,180 | 37°56′N 14°42′E | Nebrodi | Messina | |
| Montagna Grande | 1,374 | 4,508 | | | 37°56′N 15°11′E | Peloritani | Messina | |
| Monte Pizzuta | 1,333 | 4,373 | | | 37°59′N 13°15′E | Monti di Piana degli Albanesi | Palermo | |
| Monte Altesina | 1,192 | 3,911 | | | 37°40′N 14°17′E | Erean Mountains | Enna | |
| Monte Sparagio | 1,110 | 3,640 | | | 38°03′N 12°46′E | | Trapani | |
| Monte Lauro | 987 | 3,238 | | | 37°07′N 14°49′E | Hyblaean Mountains | Syracuse | |
| Rocca di Novara | 1,340 | 4,400 | 372 | 1,220 | 38°00′N 15°9′E | Peloritani | Messina | |
| Monte Dinnammare | | | | | | Peloritani | Messina | |
| Monte Casale | | | | | | Hyblaean Mountains | | |
| Monte Raci | | | | | | Hyblaean Mountains | | |
| Monte Erice | | | | | | Monti di Trapani | | |
| Monte Arcibessi | | | | | | Hyblaean Mountains | | |
| Monte Adranone | 899 | 2,949 | | | | Monti Sicani | Agrigento | |
| Mount Alveria | | | | | | | Syracuse | |
| Monte Barraù | | | | | | Monti Sicani | | |
| Monte Bubbonia | | | | | | | | |
| Mount Cammarata | | | | | | Monti Sicani | | |
| Monte Kronio | | | | | | | Agrigento | |
| Mount Pellegrino | | | | | | | | |
| Monte Scuderi | | | | | | | | |
| Monte delle Rose | | | | | | | | |

=== Sardinia ===
| Mountain | Height | | Drop | | Coordinates | Range | Province | First ascent |
| Mountain | m | ft | m | ft | Coordinates | Range | Province | First ascent |
|---|---|---|---|---|---|---|---|---|
| La Marmora | 1,834 | 6,017 | 1,834 | 6,017 | 40°1′N 9°18′E | | Sardinia | |
| Monte Linas | 1,216 | 3,990 | 1,190 | 3,900 | 39°27′N 8°37′E | | Sardinia | |
| Monte Limbara | 1,365 | 4,478 | 1,070 | 3,510 | 40°51′N 9°11′E | | Sardinia | |
| Monte Is Caravius | 1,116 | 3,661 | 970 | 3,180 | 39°9′N 8°50′E | | Sardinia | |
| Monte Santu Padre | 1,025 | 3,363 | 71 | 233 | 40°17′48″N 8°50′27″E | Catena del Marghine | Sardinia | |

=== Other mountains ===
| Mountain | Height | | Drop | | Coordinates | Province | Island | Range | First ascent |
| Mountain | m | ft | m | ft | Coordinates | Province | Island | Range | First ascent |
|---|---|---|---|---|---|---|---|---|---|
| Mount Capanne | 1,018 | 3,340 | 1,007 | 3,304 | 42°46′N 10°10′E | Livorno | Elba | Elba | |
| Monte Fossa delle Felci | 963 | 3,159 | 963 | 3,159 | 38°33′N 14°51′E | Messina | Salina | Aeolian | |
| Mount Stromboli | 924 | 3,031 | 924 | 3,031 | 38°48′N 15°13′E | Messina | Stromboli | Aeolian | |
| Monte dei Porri | 860 | 2,820 | 565 | 1,854 | 38°34′N 14°49′E | Messina | Salina | Aeolian | |
| Mount Epomeo | 789 | 2,589 | 787 | 2,582 | 40°44′N 13°54′E | Naples | Ischia | Campanian | |
| Monte Solaro | 589 | 1,932 | 589 | 1,932 | 40°33′N 14°13′E | Campanian | Capri | | |
| Vulcano | 501 | 1,644 | 501 | 1,644 | 38°24′N 14°58′E | Messina | Vulcano | Aeolian | |

== See also ==
- List of volcanoes in Italy
- List of mountains of the Alps
- List of Alpine peaks by prominence
- List of Alpine four-thousanders
- List of Italian regions by highest point

== Sources ==
- Jonathan de Ferranti & Eberhard Jurgalski's map-checked ALPS TO R589m and rough, computer-generated EUROPE TO R150m lists
- Mark Trengrove's lists of several regions of the French Alps, and of the Grand paradiso and Rutor ranges of the Italian Alps
