= Pointe d'Archeboc =

Mountain in Italy

- Ormelune
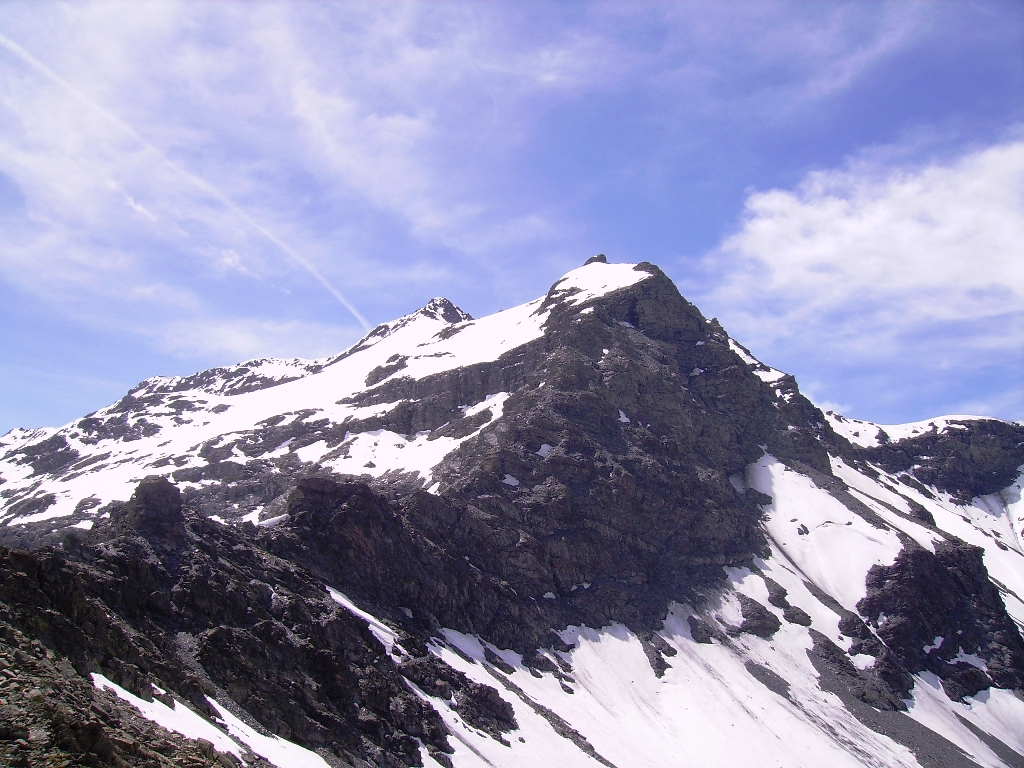
- Pointe d'Archeboc

Highest point
- Elevation: 3,272 m (10,735 ft)
- Prominence: 439 m (1,440 ft)
- Listing: Alpine mountains above 3000 m
- Coordinates: 45°35′02″N 6°58′48″E

Geography
- Location within Alps
- Location: Savoie, France / Aosta Valley, Italy
- Parent range: Graian Alps

Pointe d'Archeboc (3,272 m) is a mountain of the Graian Alps on the border between Aosta Valley, Italy and Savoie, France.

A popular peak for ski mountaineering, the Archeboc is a long ridge with three different summits. It is usually climbed from the Valgrisenche side in Italy.
