= Pizzo del Diavolo di Tenda =

Mountain of Lombardy, Italy

Coordinates: 46°02′43″N 9°54′29″E

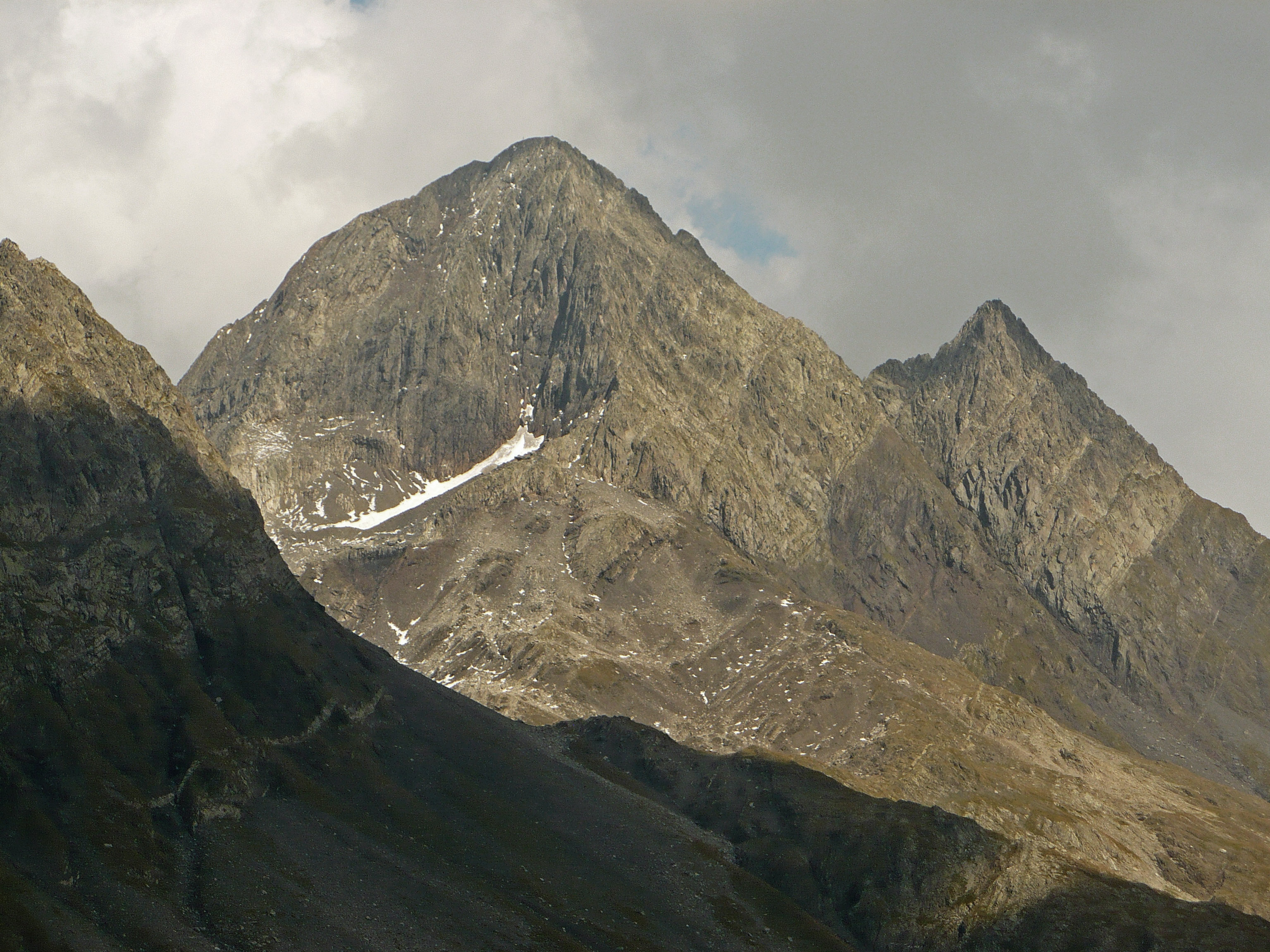

Highest point
- Elevation: 2,914 m (9,560 ft)

Geography
- Location: Lombardy, Italy
- Parent range: Bergamo Alps

Pizzo del Diavolo di Tenda is a mountain of Lombardy, Italy, located within the Bergamo Alps. It is the highest peak of the Val Brembana. It has been a popular destination for mountain hiking for over a century. There is a rifugio near this mountain and Monte Cabianca.
