= Monte Alpi =

Mountain in Italy

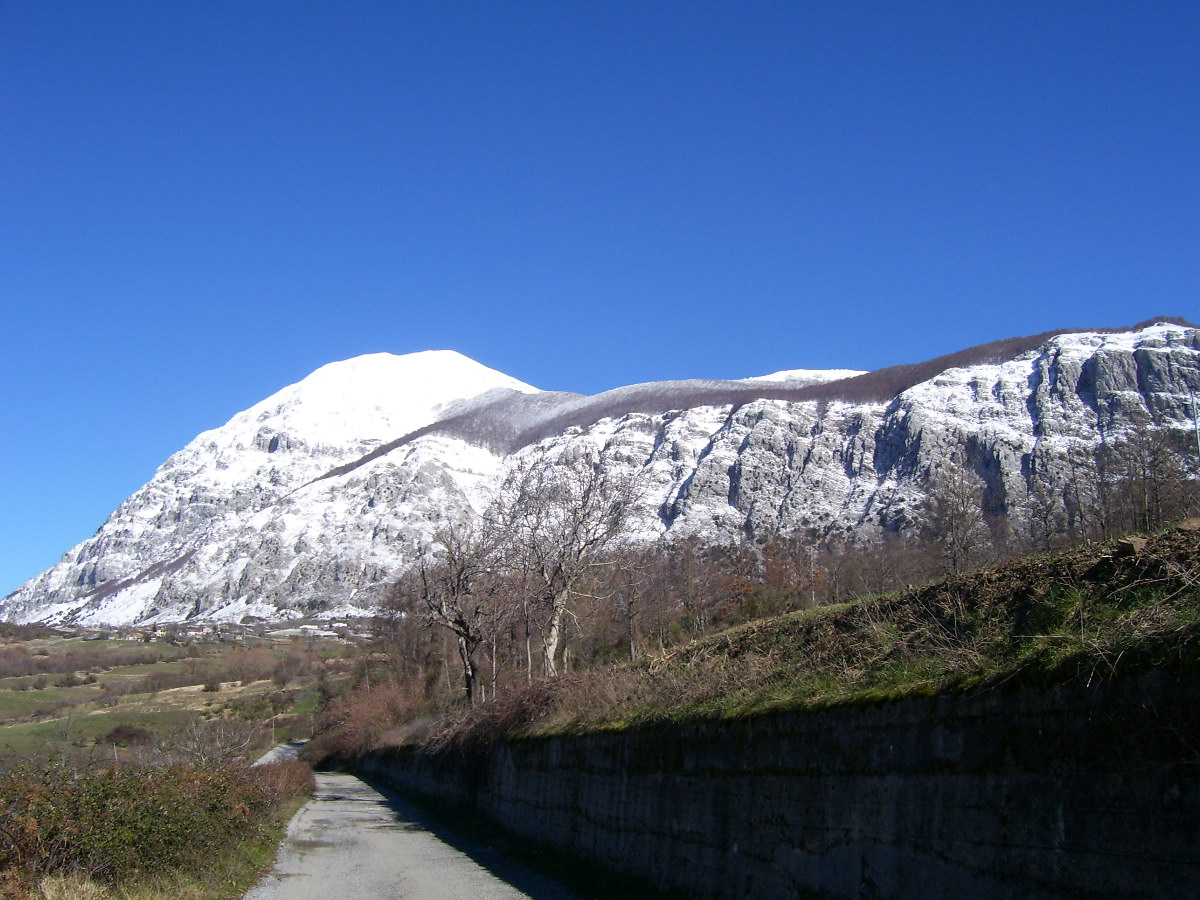

Highest point
- Elevation: 1,900 m (6,200 ft)
- Prominence: 920 m (3,020 ft)
- Listing: Mountains of Italy
- Coordinates: 40°07′18″N 15°58′38″E

Geography
- Location within Italy
- Location: Basilicata, Italy
- Parent range: Apennine Mountains

Monte Alpi with its twin peaks Pizzo Falcone (1.900 m) and Santa Croce (1.893 m) is a mountain of Basilicata, southern Italy.
