= Grande Rousse =

Mountain in Italy

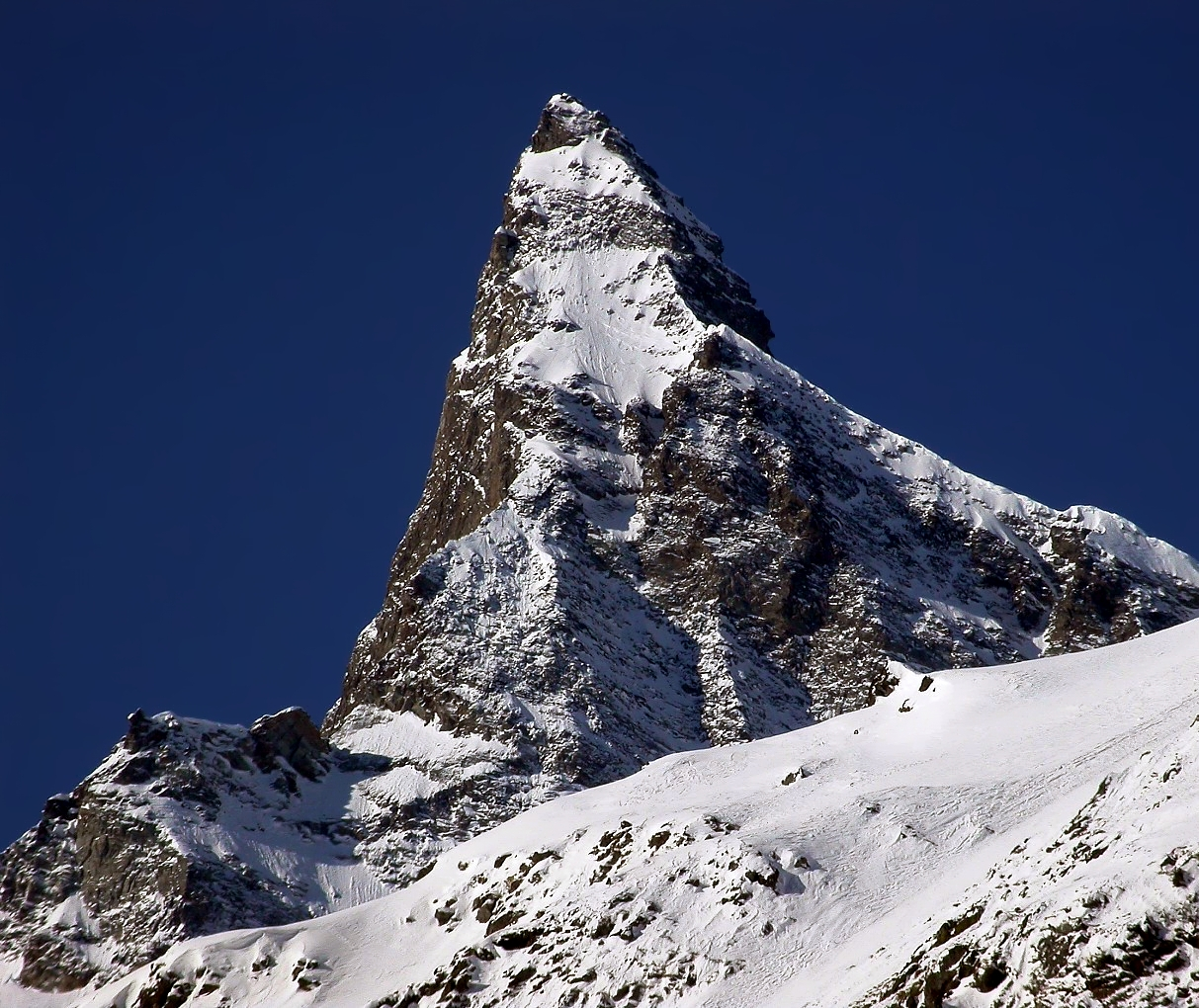
- Grande Rousse summit

Highest point
- Elevation: 3,607 m (11,834 ft)
- Listing: Alpine mountains above 3000 m
- Coordinates: 45°33′49″N 7°05′03″E

Geography
- Location within Alps
- Location: Aosta Valley, Italy
- Parent range: Graian Alps

Climbing
- First ascent: 1864

The Grande Rousse (3,607m) is a mountain of the Graian Alps in Aosta Valley, Italy. It is the culminating point of a ridge separating the Rhêmes and the Valgrisenche valleys. It was first climbed in 1864.
