= Laaser Spitze =

Mountain in Italy

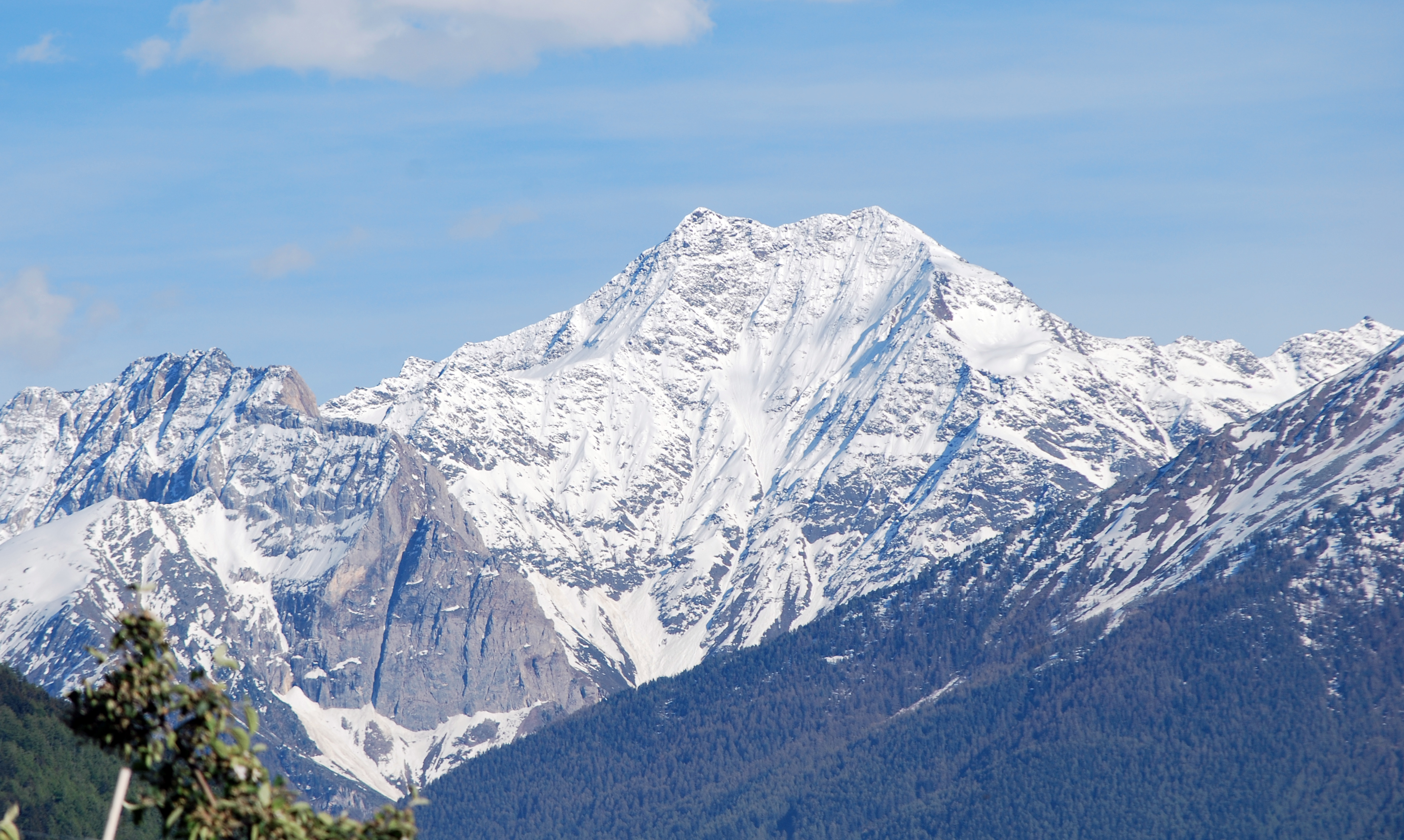

Highest point
- Elevation: 3,305 m (10,843 ft)
- Prominence: 318 m (1,043 ft)
- Listing: Alpine mountains above 3000 m
- Coordinates: 46°33′43″N 10°43′5″E

Geography
- Location within Alps
- Location: South Tyrol, Italy
- Parent range: Ortler Alps

The Laaser Spitze, also Orgelspitze, is a mountain in the Ortler Alps in South Tyrol, Italy.
