= Mont-Fallère =

Mountain in Italy

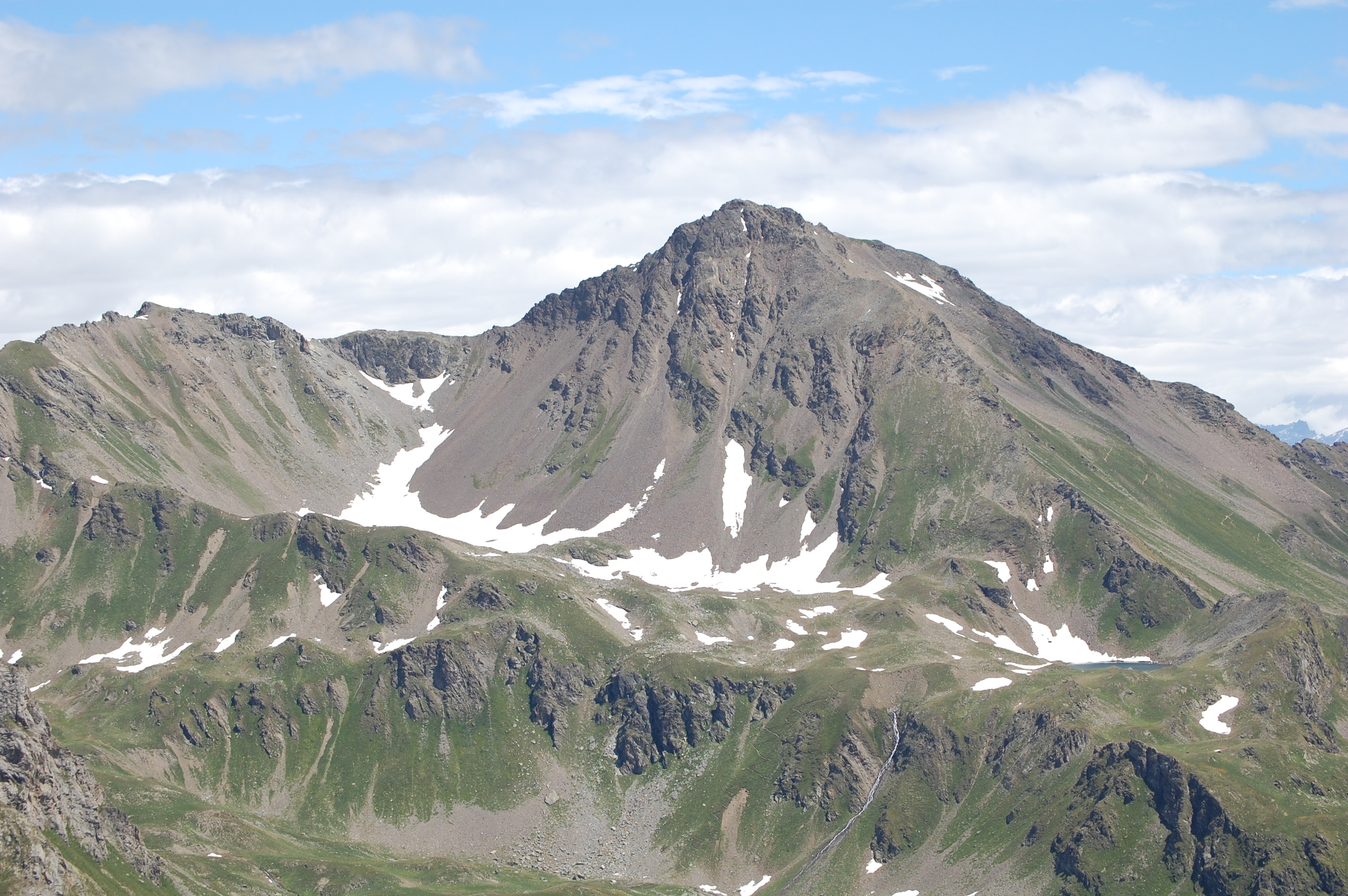
- West face of the Mont Fallère

Highest point
- Elevation: 3,061 m (10,043 ft)
- Prominence: 554 m (1,818 ft)
- Isolation: 10.26 km (6.38 mi)
- Listing: Alpine mountains above 3000 m
- Coordinates: 45°46′32″N 7°11′42″E

Geography
- Location within Alps
- Location: Aosta Valley, Italy
- Parent range: Pennine Alps

Climbing
- Easiest route: Hike

The Mont-Fallère or Mont Fallère (sometimes wrongly spelled in Italian as Fallere) is a 3,061.5 metres high mountain belonging to the Italian side of Pennine Alps.

== Geography ==
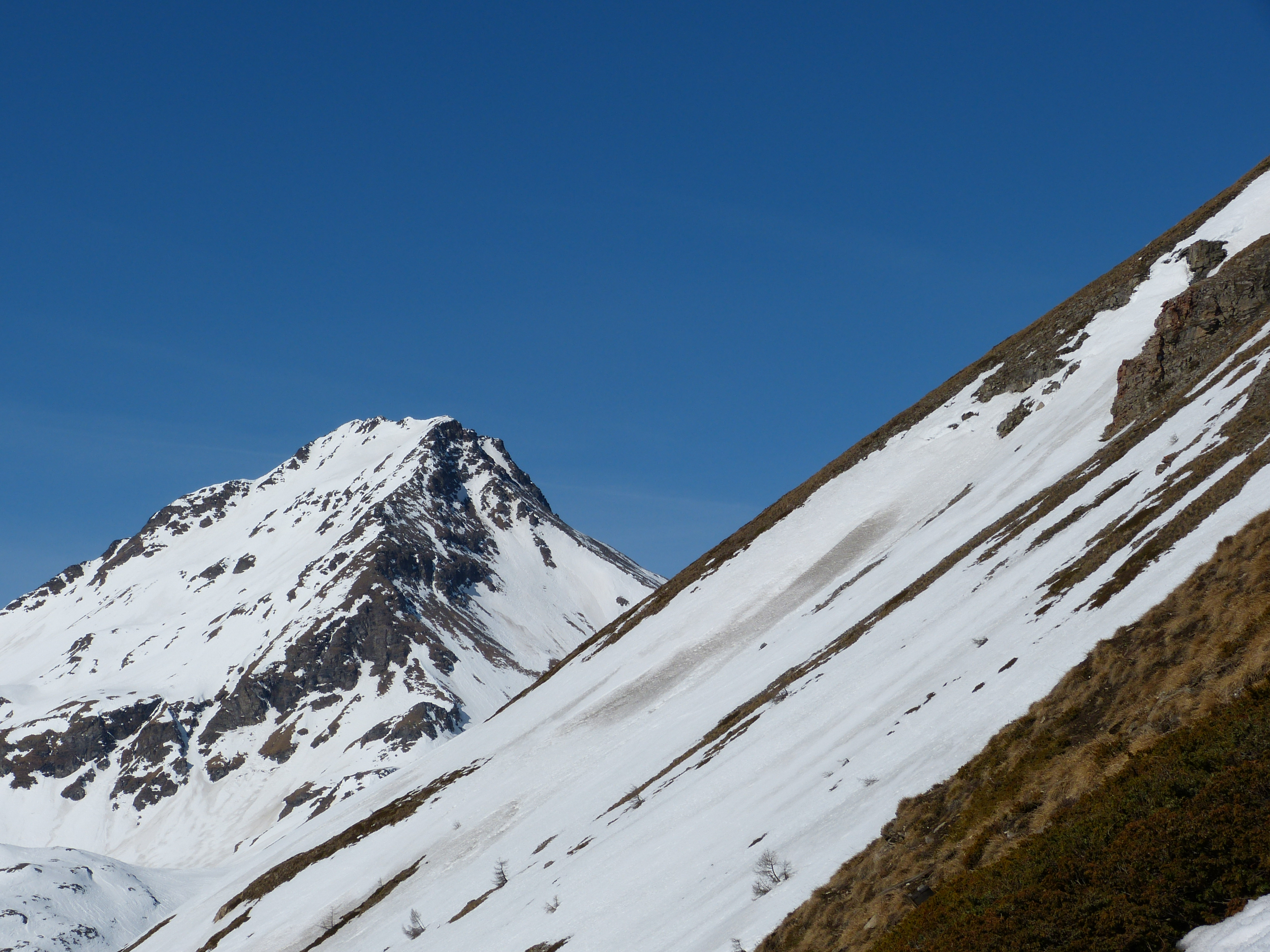
Winter view

The Mont-Fallère is located on the ridge dividing the Great St Bernard Valley (North and East) from the Valdigne, a term and used to define the upper part of the Aosta Valley. Administratively the mountain is the tripoint connecting the Italian comunes of Sarre, Gignod and Saint-Pierre.

=== SOIUSA classification ===
According to SOIUSA (International Standardized Mountain Subdivision of the Alps) the mountain can be classified in the following way:

- main part = Western Alps
- major sector = North Western Alps
- section = Pennine Alps
- subsection = Grand Combin Alps
- supergroup = Catena Grande Rochère-Grand Golliaz
- group = Grande Rochère-Monte Fallère
- subgroup = Gruppo del Monte Fallère
- code = I/B-9.I-A.2.b

== Access to the summit ==
The mountain can be accessed by signposted routes or from Thouraz (1.652 m), a village in the comune of Sarre, or from Vétan (Saint-Pierre). Both of them require some hiking experience. The top of Mont-Fallère offers a good point of view on Mont Blanc, Grand Combin, Grivola and many other peaks of the Graian and Pennine Alps.

=== Mountain huts ===
- Refuge du Mont-Fallère (2,385 m).

== Maps ==
- Military Geographic Institute (IGM) official maps of Italy, 1:25.000 and 1:100.000 scale, on-line version
- Carta dei sentieri e dei rifugi scala 1:50.000 n. 5 Cervino e Monte Rosa, Istituto Geografico Centrale - Torino
