= Pizzo Ligoncio =

Mountain in Italy

Coordinates: 46°14′21″N 9°32′50″E

Highest point
- Elevation: 3,033 m (9,951 ft)
- Listing: Alpine mountains above 3000 m

Geography
- Location: Lombardy, Italy

Pizzo Ligoncio is a mountain of Lombardy, Italy. It has an elevation of 3,033 metres (9,951 ft).
