= Wurmaulspitze =

Mountain in Italy

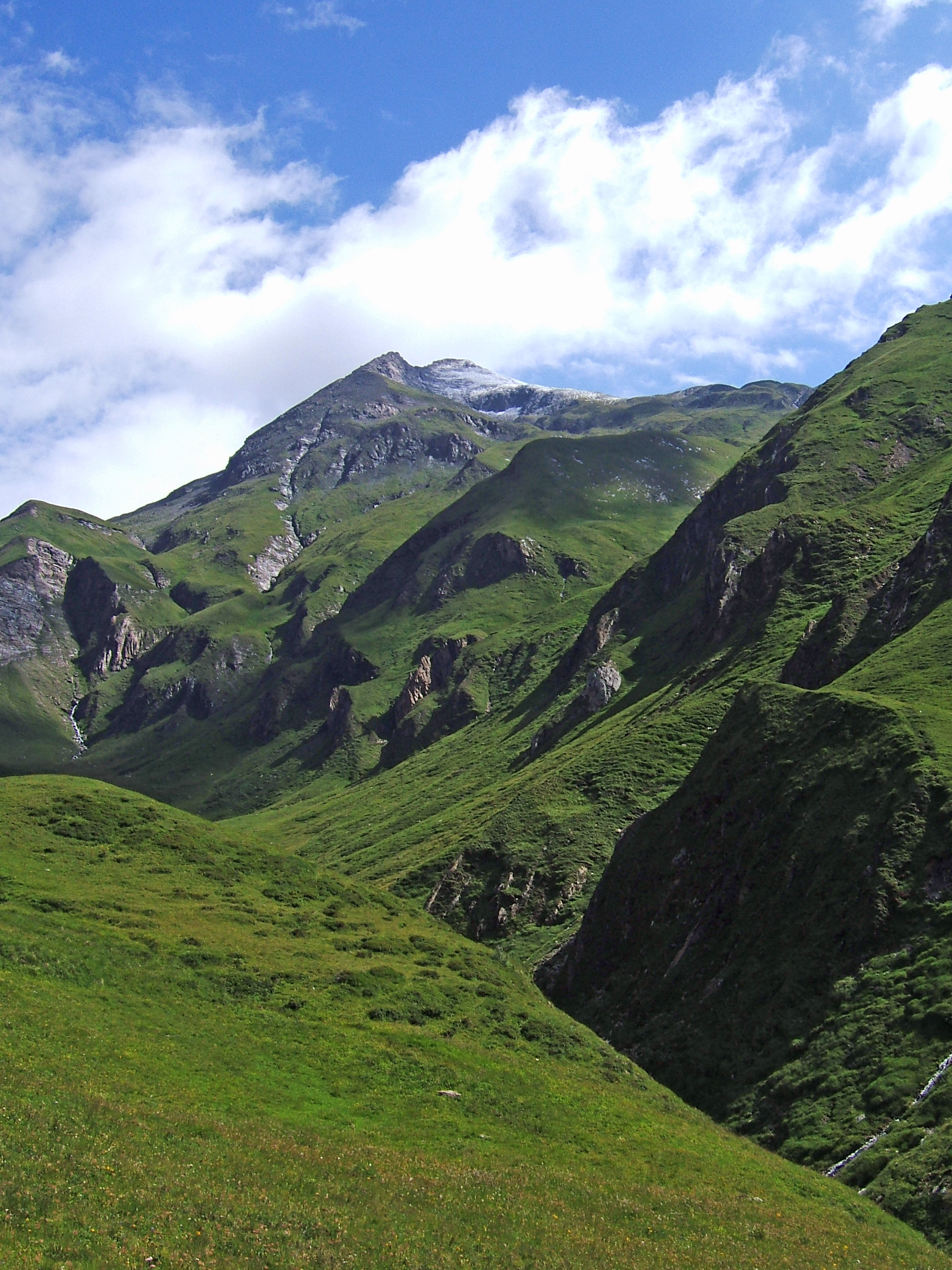

Highest point
- Elevation: 3,022 m (9,915 ft)
- Listing: Alpine mountains above 3000 m
- Coordinates: 46°54′52″N 11°38′13″E

Geography
- Location: South Tyrol, Italy
- Parent range: Zillertal Alps

The Wurmaulspitze is a mountain in the Zillertal Alps in South Tyrol, Italy.
