= Piz Combul =

Mountain in Switzerland

- Pizzo Combolo
- Location within Alps

Highest point
- Elevation: 2,901 m (9,518 ft)
- Prominence: 313 m (1,027 ft)
- Parent peak: Pizzo Scalino
- Coordinates: 46°13′47″N 10°02′38″E

Geography
- Location: Graubünden, Switzerland / Lombardy, Italy
- Parent range: Bernina Range

Piz Combul (also known as Pizzo Combolo) is a mountain of the Bernina Range (Alps), located on the border between Italy and Switzerland. It lies between the Val Fontana and the Val Poschiavo. With a height of 2,901 metres above sea level, Piz Combul is the highest summit of the range lying south of the Bocchetta da Vartegna (2,588 m).
