= Haunold =

Mountain in Italy

- Rocca dei Baranci (Italian)
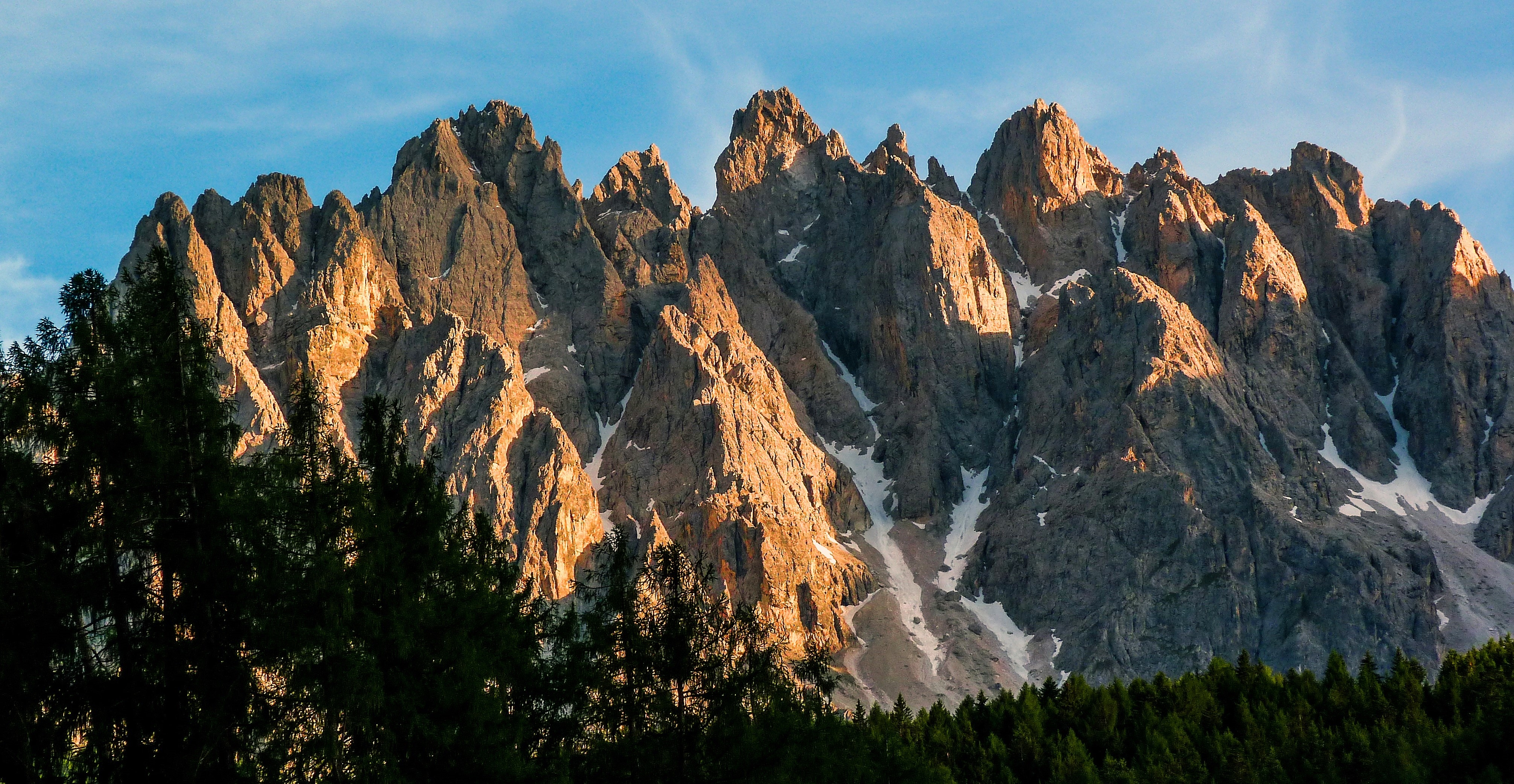

Highest point
- Elevation: 2,966 m (9,731 ft)
- Prominence: 677 m (2,221 ft)
- Coordinates: 46°41′18″N 12°16′39″E

Geography
- Location within Alps
- Location: South Tyrol, Italy
- Parent range: Dolomites

Climbing
- First ascent: 28 July 1878 by J. Oberschneider

The Haunold is a mountain in the Dolomites in South Tyrol, Italy.

== See also ==
- Southern Limestone Alps
