= Testa Grigia (Aosta Valley) =

Mountain in Italy

Testa Grigia / Tête grise
- Groabhopt (Walser German); Graukopf (German)
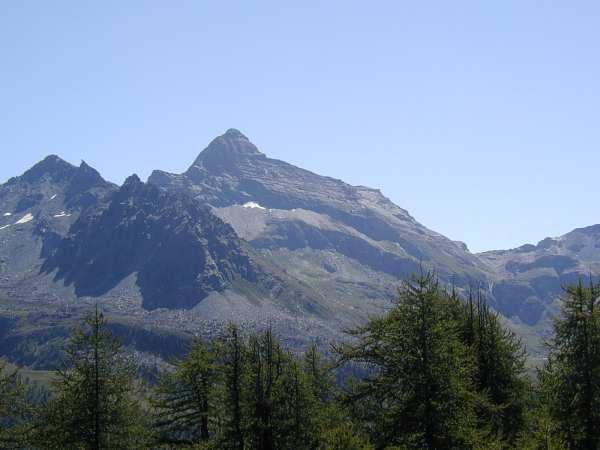
- Testa Grigia

Highest point
- Elevation: 3,315 m (10,876 ft)
- Prominence: 643 m (2,110 ft)
- Isolation: 7.05 km (4.38 mi)
- Listing: Alpine mountains above 3000 m
- Coordinates: 45°49′51″N 7°47′11″E

Geography
- Location within Alps
- Location: Aosta Valley, Italy
- Parent range: Pennine Alps

Testa Grigia (French : Tête grise, lit. "grey head") (3,315m) is a mountain on the Italian side of the Monte Rosa Massif in the Pennine Alps. It is the highest mountain of the ridge that separates the Lys valley (Gressoney-La-Trinité) from the Ayas Valley, in Aosta Valley.

== Ascent ==
It is usually climbed from the Gressoney side, where the climb presents no technical difficulties, as the route is assisted by a fixed rope. The summit offers a fine balcony view of Monte Rosa and the Matterhorn.
