= Monte Re di Castello =

Mountain in Italy

Coordinates: 46°01′17″N 10°28′59″E

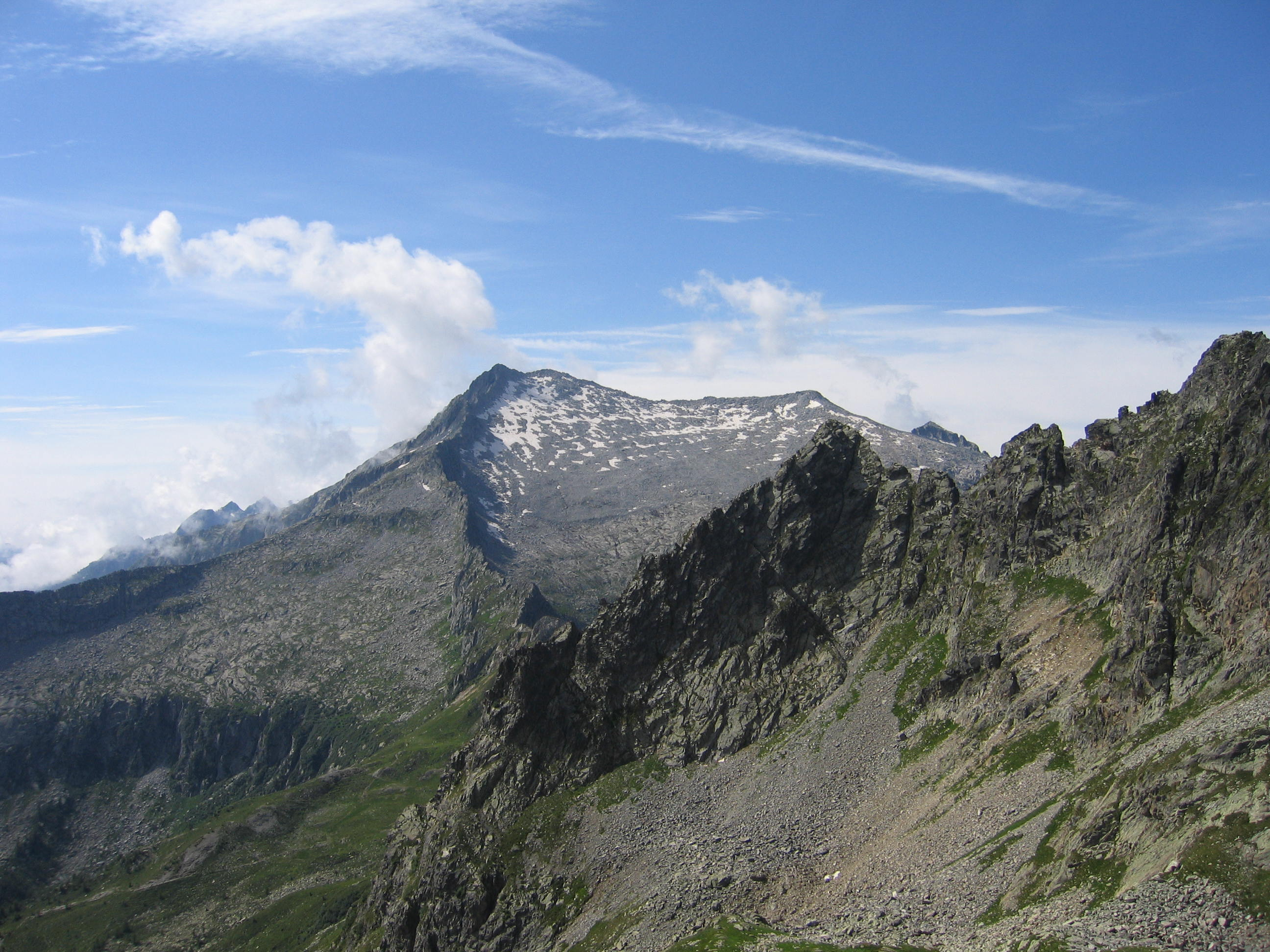

Highest point
- Elevation: 2,889 m (9,478 ft)

Geography
- Location: Lombardy, Italy

Monte Re di Castello is a mountain of Lombardy, Italy. It has an elevation of 2,889 metres (9,478 ft) above sea level.
