= Ilmenspitze =

Mountain in Italy

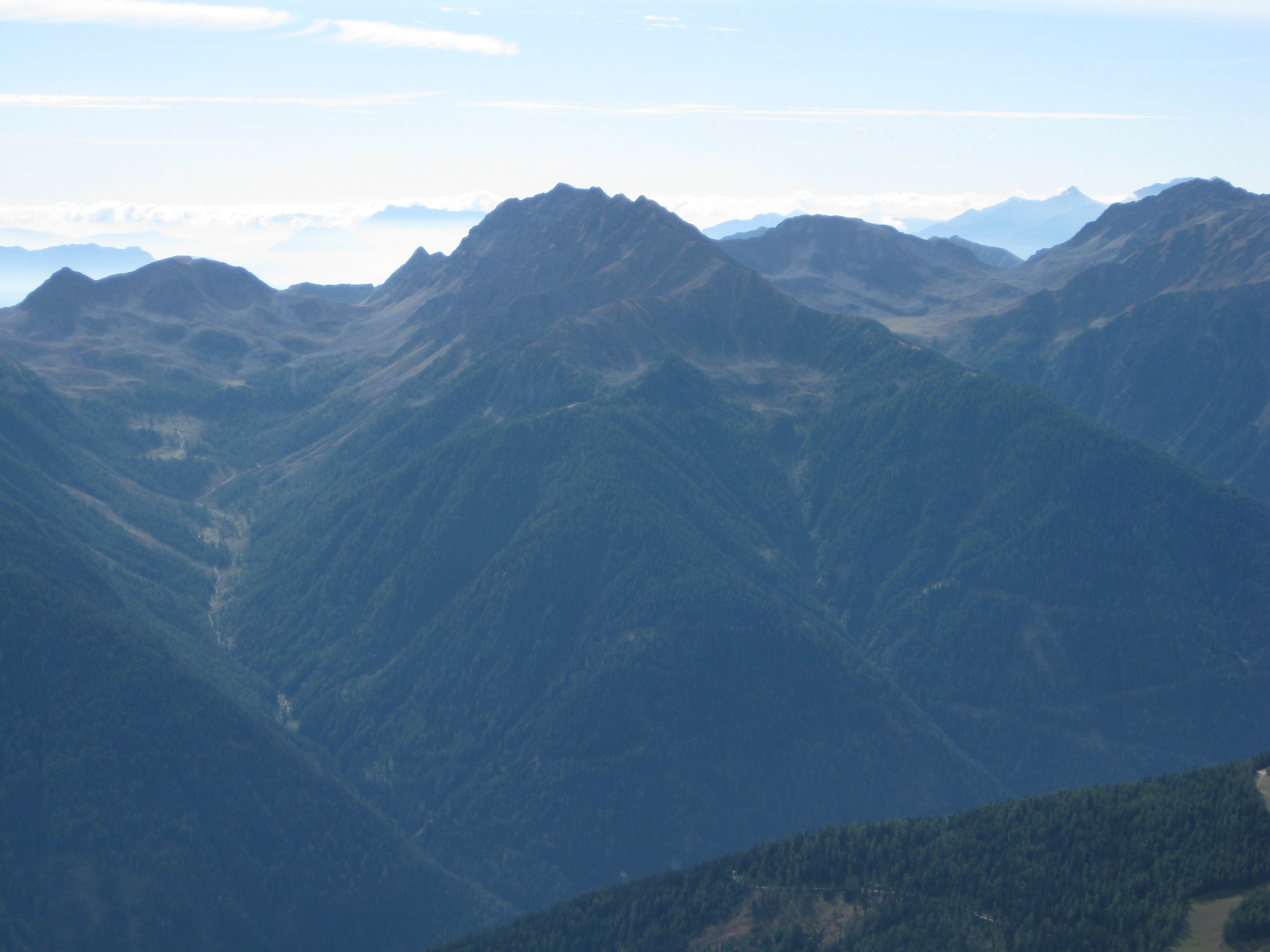
- Ilmenspitze from North

Highest point
- Elevation: 2,657 m (8,717 ft)
- Coordinates: 46°28′55″N 10°57′50″E

Geography
- Location within Alps
- Location: South Tyrol / Trentino, Italy
- Parent range: Ortler Alps

The Ilmenspitze (Italian: Cima degli Olmi) is a mountain in the Ortler Alps on the border between South Tyrol and Trentino, Italy. It is the highest peak of Ilmenkamm, a mountain crest in the Ortler Alps and a prominent peak between the Val d'Ultimo and the Deutschnonsberg.
