= Pizzo dell'Alpe Gelato =

Mountain of the Lepontine Alps

- Location within Alps Location within Piedmont Location within Switzerland

Highest point
- Elevation: 2,613 m (8,573 ft)
- Prominence: 360 m (1,180 ft)
- Coordinates: 46°15′05″N 8°26′35″E

Geography
- Location: Switzerland / Italy
- Parent range: Lepontine Alps

The Pizzo dell'Alpe Gelato is a mountain in the Lepontine Alps on the Swiss-Italian border.
