= Pizzo Straciugo =

Mountain in Switzerland

- Location within Alps

Highest point
- Elevation: 2,713 m (8,901 ft)
- Prominence: 335 m (1,099 ft)
- Coordinates: 46°07′56″N 8°07′15″E

Geography
- Location: Valais, Switzerland; Piedmont, Italy
- Parent range: Pennine Alps

Pizzo Straciugo is a mountain of the Pennine Alps, located on the border between Switzerland and Italy. It lies east of the Portjengrat, on the range between the Val Divedro (Valais) and Domodossola (Piedmont).
