= Valgrisenche =

Valgrisenche Vâgresèntse (Valdôtain)
- Comune
- Comune di Valgrisenche; Commune de Valgrisenche
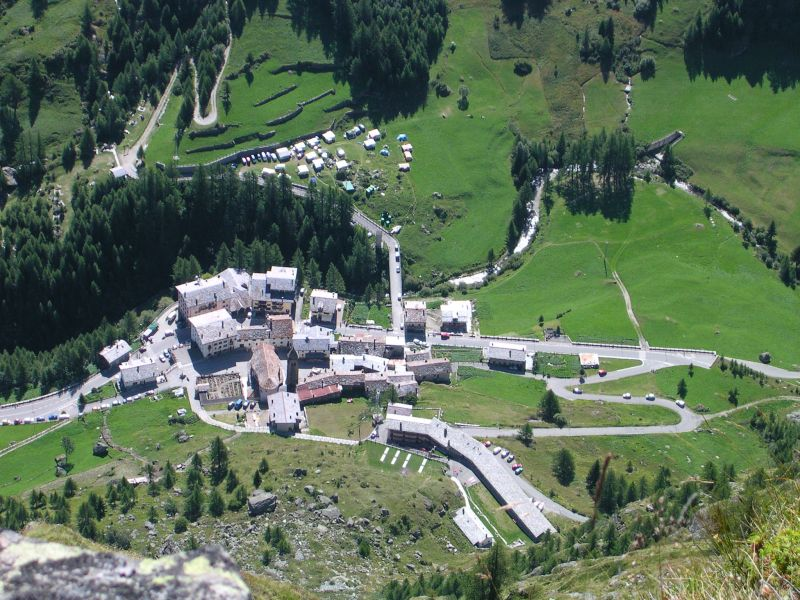
- The village L'église as seen from the via ferrata Béthaz-Bovard.

- Coat of arms

- Location within Italy Location within Aosta Valley
- Coordinates: 45°37′48″N 7°3′52.20″E
- Country: Italy
- Region: Aosta Valley
- Province: none
- Frazioni: Bonne, Céré, Chez-Carral, Darbelley, Village de l'église, Gerbelle, La Béthaz, La Frassy, Menthieu, Mondanges, Prariond, Planté, Revers, Rocher, Surier, Usellières

Area
  - Total: 112 km^{2} (43 sq mi)
- Elevation: 1,664 m (5,459 ft)

Population (31 December 2022)
  - Total: 191
  - Density: 1.71/km^{2} (4.42/sq mi)
- Demonym: Valgriseins
- Time zone: UTC+1 (CET)
  - Summer (DST): UTC+2 (CEST)
- Postal code: 11010
- Dialing code: 0165
- ISTAT code: 7068
- Patron saint: St. Gratus
- Saint day: 7 September
- Website: Official website

Valgrisenche (French: [valgʁizɑ̃ʃ]; Valdôtain: Vâgresèntse) is a town and comune in the Aosta Valley region of north-western Italy.
