= Monte Cabianca =

Mountain in Italy

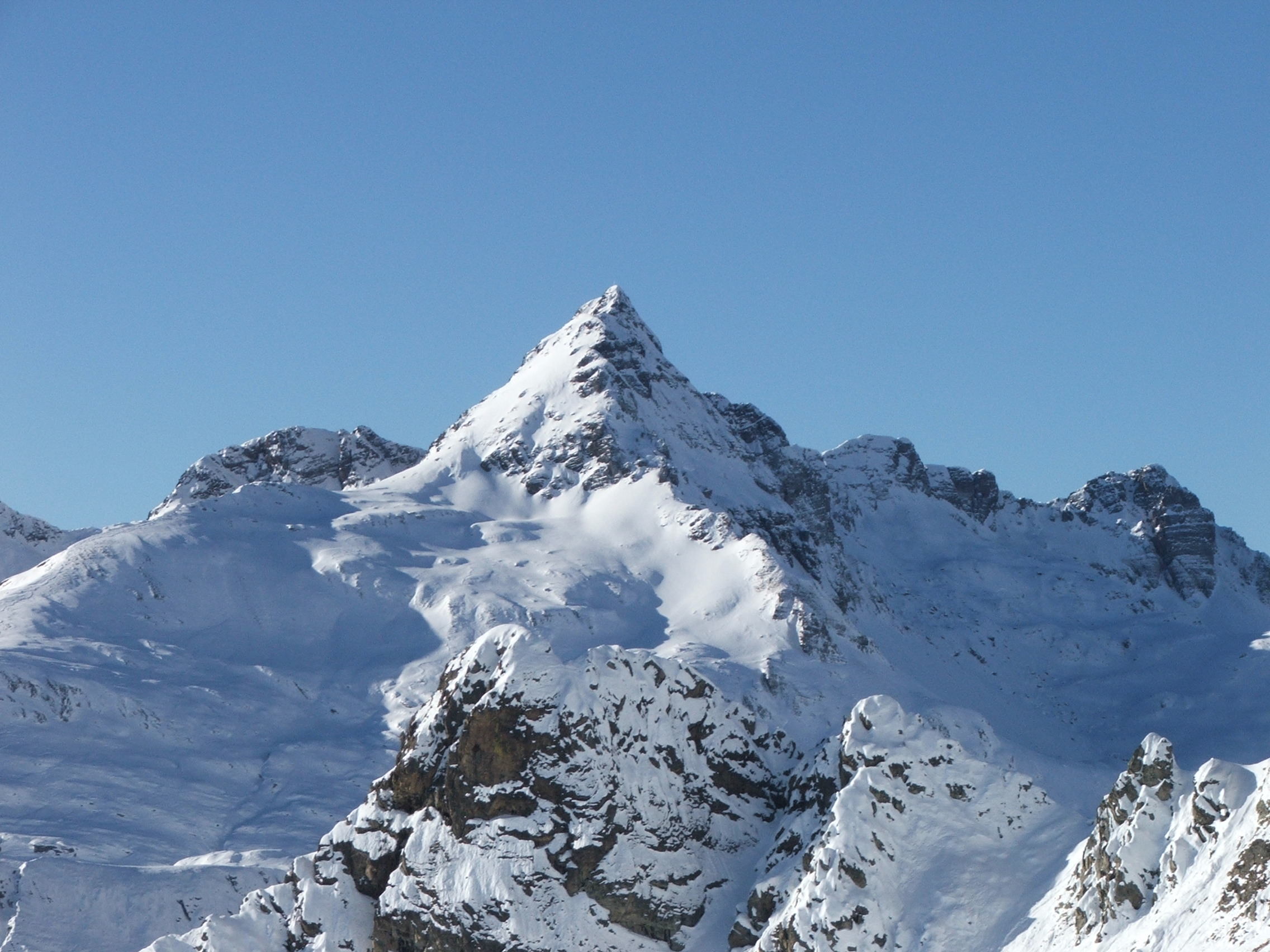

Highest point
- Elevation: 2,601 m (8,533 ft)
- Coordinates: 46°00′37″N 9°52′01″E

Geography
- Location within Italy
- Location: Lombardy, Italy
- Parent range: Bergamo Alps

Monte Cabianca is a mountain of Lombardy, Italy. It is located within the Bergamo Alps.

Geologically, Monte Cabianca is very complex.

Mountain hiking is a popular activity in this section of the Alps, and there is a rifugio near Monte Cabianca.
