= List of prominent mountains of the Alps (2500–2999 m) =

This page contains a table listing by elevation all 514 mountains of the Alps that are between 2500 and 3000m m high and which also have a topographic prominence of at least 300 metres (984 ft). The list is a continuation of the List of prominent mountains of the Alps above 3000 m, which contains an introduction with statistics and an explanation of the criteria. The list is continued down to 2000 m elevation on this page.

== Alpine mountains between 2500 and 3000 m ==
Rank (Note: Unranked summits have a topographic prominence between 293 and 299 m. They are included given the uncertainties in estimating these values.)	Mountain	Height (m)	Drop (m) (Note: Numbers in italics are estimates when a precise height for the key col is lacking. For example, maps often provide heights for the place where a route passes over a ridge rather than for the lowest point in the ridge.)	Coordinates	Range (Note: For the Eastern Alps the range names are according to the Alpine Club classification of the Eastern Alps.)	Range (Note: SOIUSA codes, representing a proposal for a new classification system of the Alps. The codes usually but not always correspond to established ranges. Sorting on this tab puts the mountains in a geographic order, roughly from the southwest to the east.)	Region (Note: State in Austria and Germany, department in France, province in Italy, and canton in Switzerland.)	Country	First ascent
538	Große Zinne/Cima Grande di Lavaredo	2999	545	46°37′08″N 12°18′10″E	Sexten Dolomites	II/C-31.I-A	Belluno/S-Tyrol	IT	1869
539	Pizzo Centrale	2999	451	46°34′41″N 08°36′54″E	Leone-Gotthard Alps	I/B-10.I-B	Ticino/Uri	CH	
540	Cima Falkner	2999	343	46°11′36″N 10°54′17″E	Brenta Dolomites	II/C-28.IV-A	Trentino	IT	1882
541	Piz Beverin	2998	396	46°39′09″N 09°21′28″E	Adula Alps	I/B-10.III-C	Graubünden	CH	1707
	Pic d'Artsinol	2998	296	46°06′54″N 07°25′37″E	Grand Combin Alps	I/B-09.I-D	Valais	CH	
542	Bric Bouchet /Bric Bucie	2997	338	44°49′19″N 07°01′26″E	Central Cottian Alps	I/A-04.II-A	H-Alpes/Turin	FR/IT	1876
543	Hoher Dachstein	2995	2136	47°28′31″N 13°36′20″E	Dachstein Mountains	II/B-25.I-B	Styria/U-Austria	AT	1832
544	Roignais	2995	1028	45°38′35″N 06°41′20″E	Beaufortain Massif	I/B-07.VI-A	Savoie	FR	
545	Rote Säule (Tauern)	2994	304	47°08′48″N 12°26′38″E	Venediger Group	II/A-17.II-A	E-Tyrol/Salzburg	AT	1865
546	Le Mourre Froid	2993	411	44°38′18″N 06°24′01″E	Massif des Écrins	I/A-05.III-C	Hautes-Alpes	FR	
547	Grand Parpaillon	2990	335	44°29′38″N 06°39′07″E	Southern Cottian Alps	I/A-04.I-B	A-d-H-Provence	FR	
548	Mittler Fanis / Fanis di Mezzo	2989	658	46°33′05″N 12°00′51″E	Dolomites - NE	II/C-31.I-C	Belluno/S-Tyrol	IT	1898
549	Felber Tauernkogel	2988	377	47°09′28″N 12°29′02″E	Venediger Group	II/A-17.II-A	E-Tyrol/Salzburg	AT	1854
550	Piz de la Lumbreida	2983	564	46°28′52″N 09°13′31″E	Adula Alps	I/B-10.III-D	Graubünden	CH	
551	Cima Bagni	2983	455	46°36′55″N 12°24′37″E	Sexten Dolomites	II/C-31.I-A	Belluno	IT	
552	Pala di San Martino	2982	410	46°15′13″N 11°51′03″E	Dolomites - S	II/C-31.IV-A	Trentino	IT	1878
553	Rosengartenspitze/Cima Catinaccio	2981	425	46°27′17″N 11°37′15″E	Dolomites - NW	II/C-31.III-B	S-Tyrol/Trentino	IT	1874
554	Aroser Rothorn	2980	1349	46°44′16″N 09°36′50″E	Plessur Alps	II/A-15.VII-B	Graubünden	CH	
555	Ròthòre / Corno Rosso	2979	490	45°46′01″N 07°52′49″E	Monte Rosa Alps	I/B-09.III-C	Aosta/Vercelli	IT	
556	La Tsavre	2978	305	45°54′56″N 07°07′46″E	Grand Combin Alps	I/B-09.I-A	Valais	CH	
557	Grand Pic de Belledonne	2977	1053	45°10′15″N 05°59′30″E	Belledonne	I/A-05.II-B	Isère	FR	1859
558	Pic de Colle Blanche	2975	335	44°45′12″N 06°10′21″E	Massif des Écrins	I/A-05.V-A	Hautes-Alpes	FR	
559	Monte Redival	2973	356	46°18′31″N 10°36′51″E	Ortler Alps	II/C-28.I-A	Trentino	IT	1878
560	Chateleysine /Tsa at a l'Etsena	2973	327	45°48′05″N 07°23′59″E	Weisshorn-Matterhorn	I/B-09.II-B	Aosta Valley	IT	
561	Cima Ovest/Westliche Zinne	2973	306	46°37′07″N 12°17′50″E	Sexten Dolomites	II/C-31.I-A	Belluno/S-Tyrol	IT	1879
562	Piz Curvér	2972	456	46°36′12″N 09°29′50″E	Oberhalbstein Range	II/A-15.I-B	Graubünden	CH	1843
563	Wildgrat	2971	461	47°08′26″N 10°49′36″E	Ötztal Alps	II/A-16.I-C	North Tyrol	AT	
564	Schilthorn	2970	358	46°33′27″N 07°50′05″E	Bernese Prealps	I/B-14.II-B	Bern	CH	
565	Haut de Cry	2969	525	46°14′25″N 07°11′42″E	Vaud Alps	I/B-12.III-A	Valais	CH	
566	Grieshorn	2969	509	46°27′05″N 08°23′35″E	Leone-Gotthard Alps	I/B-10.I-A	Ticino/V-C-O	CH/IT	
567	Dent de Morcles	2969	465	46°11′57″N 07°04′32″E	Vaud Alps	I/B-12.III-A	Valais	CH	1787
568	Piz Daint	2968	734	46°37′07″N 10°17′27″E	Ortler Alps	II/A-15.V-A	Graubünden	CH	
569	Neuner / Sas dles Nü	2968	301	46°37′49″N 11°58′52″E	Dolomites - NE	II/C-31.I-C	South Tyrol	IT	
	Cima del Duca	2968	293	46°17′16″N 09°47′46″E	Bregaglia Range	II/A-15.III-B	Sondrio	IT	
570	Serottini	2967	425	46°17′27″N 10°20′52″E	Ortler Alps	II/C-28.I-B	Brescia/Sondrio	IT	
571	Schober	2967	380	47°02′04″N 13°28′06″E	Ankogel Group	II/A-17.II-F	Carinthia	AT	
572	Haunold	2966	677	46°41′19″N 12°16′39″E	Sexten Dolomites	II/C-31.I-A	South Tyrol	IT	1878
573	Schesaplana	2965	828	47°03′13″N 09°42′27″E	Rätikon	II/A-15.VIII-A	Vorarlb/Graub.	AT/CH	1735
574	Aiguille du Belvédère	2965	505	45°59′16″N 06°52′25″E	Chablais Alps	I/B-08.II-A	Haute-Savoie	FR	
575	Reißeck	2965	300	46°56′50″N 13°21′52″E	Ankogel Group	II/A-17.II-F	Carinthia	AT	
576	Monte Tagliaferro	2964	640	45°52′21″N 07°58′15″E	Monte Rosa Alps	I/B-09.III-C	Vercelli	IT	
577	Piz Turettas	2963	400	46°35′13″N 10°20′05″E	Ortler Alps	II/A-15.V-A	Graubünden	CH	
578	Pizzo Lucendro	2963	350	46°32′20″N 08°31′10″E	Leone-Gotthard Alps	I/B-10.I-B	Ticino/Uri	CH	1871
579	Zugspitze	2962	1746	47°25′16″N 10°59′07″E	Wetterstein	II/B-21.III-B	N-Tyrol/Bavaria	AT/DE	1820
580	Weiße Spitze	2962	910	46°52′19″N 12°21′28″E	Villgraten Mountains	II/A-17.III-B	East Tyrol	AT	1894
581	Rienzenstock	2962	479	46°40′59″N 08°38′06″E	Glarus Alps	I/B-13.I-A	Uri	CH	
582	Marchhorn/Pta del Termine	2962	327	46°26′55″N 08°27′45″E	Ticino Alps	I/B-10.II-A	Ticino/V-C-O	CH/IT	
583	Tête de l'Estrop	2961	712	44°17′12″N 06°30′21″E	Provence Alps	I/A-03.1-A	A-d-H-Provence	FR	
584	Cima Brenta Alta	2961	341	46°09′37″N 10°53′47″E	Brenta Dolomites	II/C-28.IV-A	Trentino	IT	1880
585	Piz Lagalb	2959	524	46°25′54″N 10°01′25″E	Livigno Alps	II/A-15.IV-A	Graubünden	CH	
586	Cima Giner	2957	340	46°14′14″N 10°43′57″E	Adamello-Presanella	II/C-28.III-B	Trentino	IT	
587	Piz Miez	2956	445	46°39′17″N 08°55′00″E	Adula Alps	I/B-10.III-A	Graubünden	CH	
588	Tête de L'Enchastraye/Enciastraia	2954	310	44°22′03″N 06°53′18″E	Maritime Alps	I/A-02.I-C	AdHP/Cuneo	FR/IT	
589	Torent / Torrone Alto	2952	835	46°20′37″N 09°04′16″E	Adula Alps	I/B-10.III-B	Graub./Ticino	CH	1882
590	Brunnistock	2952	661	46°50′52″N 08°33′00″E	Urner Alps	I/B-12.I-B	Uri	CH	
591	Crasta Mora	2952	486	46°34′17″N 09°52′05″E	Albula Alps	II/A-15.II-A	Graubünden	CH	
592	Bättlihorn	2951	388	46°19′57″N 08°05′38″E	Leone-Gotthard Alps	I/B-10.I-A	Valais	CH	
593	Corni di Nefelgiú	2951	368	46°23′44″N 08°22′46″E	Leone-Gotthard Alps	I/B-10.I-A	V-C-O	IT	
	Hochgrabe	2951	296	46°50′56″N 12°25′18″E	Villgraten Mountains	II/A-17.III-B	East Tyrol	AT	
594	Crête de Lacha	2950	425	45°05′50″N 06°27′34″E	Massif des Cerces	I/A-04.III-A	Savoie	FR	
595	Asta Soprana	2950	424	44°12′12″N 07°18′48″E	Maritime Alps	I/A-02.I-B	Cuneo	IT	
596	Piz Tomül / Wissensteinhorn	2946	534	46°37′24″N 09°13′42″E	Adula Alps	I/B-10.III-C	Graubünden	CH	1807
597	Piz Cavel	2946	518	46°39′21″N 09°01′11″E	Adula Alps	I/B-10.III-A	Graubünden	CH	
598	Einshorn	2944	571	46°30′58″N 09°13′49″E	Adula Alps	I/B-10.III-D	Graubünden	CH	
599	Gölbner	2943	382	46°49′27″N 12°30′18″E	Villgraten Mountains	II/A-17.III-B	East Tyrol	AT	
600	Hochkönig	2941	2181	47°25′13″N 13°03′45″E	Berchtesgaden Alps	II/B-24.III-A	Salzburg	AT	1826
601	Cime de la Condamine	2940	515	44°53′33″N 06°31′11″E	Massif des Écrins	I/A-05.III-A	Hautes-Alpes	FR	
602	Gross Schinhorn/Punta di Valdeserta	2939	465	46°21′40″N 08°15′39″E	Leone-Gotthard Alps	I/B-10.I-A	Valais/V-C-O	CH/IT	
603	Pointe de la Louïe Blanche	2939	372	45°39′40″N 06°54′53″E	Graian Alps - Central	I/B-07.III-B	Savoie/Aosta	FR/IT	
604	Pizzo del Ramulazz S	2939	324	46°23′48″N 09°05′34″E	Adula Alps	I/B-10.III-B	Graub./Ticino	CH	
	Monte Unghiasse	2939	298	45°24′58″N 07°17′42″E	Graian Alps - SE	I/B-07.I-C	Turin	IT	
605	Pic de Chabrières (Note: P.2938 on the French maps. The name Pic de Chabrières is given to a 2,747 m sub-summit and the point may have another name.)	2938	435	44°34′14″N 06°37′25″E	Southern Cottian Alps	I/A-04.I-B	A-d-H-Provence	FR	
606	Mont Malinvern / Testa Malinvern	2938	403	44°11′56″N 07°11′22″E	Maritime Alps	I/A-02.I-B	A-Marit/Cuneo	FR/IT	1878
607	Cime di Plator	2937	654	46°30′54″N 10°16′14″E	Livigno Alps	II/A-15.IV-A	Sondrio	IT	
608	Pietra Grande	2937	496	46°13′53″N 10°53′45″E	Brenta Dolomites	II/C-28.IV-A	Trentino	IT	1883
609	Monte Gruf	2936	446	46°17′10″N 09°30′21″E	Bregaglia Range	II/A-15.III-B	Sondrio	IT	
	Mont du Grand Capelet	2935	298	44°04′42″N 07°25′39″E	Maritime Alps	I/A-02.I-A	Alpes Maritimes	FR	
610	Cimon del Froppa	2932	677	46°30′26″N 12°20′26″E	Dolomites - NE	II/C-31.I-E	Belluno	IT	1872
611	Monte Pettini	2932	640	46°32′10″N 10°13′39″E	Livigno Alps	II/A-15.IV-B	Sondrio	IT	
612	Bärenhorn	2929	449	46°34′32″N 09°13′55″E	Adula Alps	I/B-10.III-C	Graubünden	CH	
613	Tête du Pelvas/Monte Palavas	2929	400	44°47′24″N 06°59′59″E	Central Cottian Alps	I/A-04.II-A	H-Alpes/Turin	FR/IT	
614	Rosställispitz	2929	368	46°47′21″N 09°59′37″E	Silvretta	II/A-15.VI-A	Graubünden	CH	
615	Schwarzhorn	2928	966	46°41′10″N 08°04′32″E	Bernese Prealps	I/B-14.II-B	Bern	CH	
616	Rocher Blanc	2928	939	45°14′30″N 06°06′26″E	Belledonne	I/A-05.II-A	Isère	FR	
617	Badus / Six Madun	2928	529	46°37′21″N 08°39′49″E	Leone-Gotthard Alps	I/B-10.I-B	Graubünden/Uri	CH	1785
618	Tête des Lauzières	2928	339	44°52′27″N 06°31′42″E	Massif des Écrins	I/A-05.III-A	Hautes-Alpes	FR	
	Vollandspitze	2928	295	47°01′07″N 10°10′36″E	Verwall	II/A-15.VI-C	North Tyrol	AT	1886
619	Eggishorn	2927	563	46°25′53″N 08°05′39″E	Bernese Alps	I/B-12.II-B	Valais	CH	
620	Cima Bastioni	2926	554	46°29′07″N 12°16′04″E	Dolomites - NE	II/C-31.I-E	Belluno	IT	1890
621	Pizzo del Diavolo della Malgina	2926	330	46°05′05″N 10°02′48″E	Bergamo Alps	II/C-29.I-A	Bergamo/Sondrio	IT	
622	Edlenkopf	2923	441	47°08′11″N 12°55′35″E	Goldberg Group	II/A-17.II-E	Salzburg	AT	
623	Mährenhorn	2923	355	46°41′30″N 08°18′39″E	Urner Alps	I/B-12.I-A	Bern	CH	
624	Birkenkofel	2922	385	46°40′51″N 12°15′24″E	Sexten Dolomites	II/C-31.I-A	South Tyrol	IT	1880
625	Mont Revic / Monte Ruvi	2922	334	45°41′21″N 07°33′52″E	Gran Paradiso Alps	I/B-07.IV-C	Aosta Valley	IT	
626	Hochgasser	2922	311	47°09′02″N 12°31′19″E	Granatspitze Group	II/A-17.II-B	E-Tyrol/Salzburg	AT	
	Aiguille du Grand Fond	2920	298	45°39′59″N 06°40′15″E	Beaufortain Massif	I/B-07.VI-A	Savoie	FR	
627	Monte Ciorneva	2918	483	45°16′06″N 07°15′37″E	Graian Alps - SE	I/B-07.I-C	Turin	IT	
628	Mulleter Seichenkopf	2918	389	46°54′55″N 12°49′53″E	Schober Group	II/A-17.II-D	Carinthia/E-Tyrol	AT	1890
629	Corno di Flavona	2918	305	46°14′44″N 10°53′49″E	Brenta Dolomites	II/C-28.IV-A	Trentino	IT	1881
	Piz de Puez	2918	301	46°35′55″N 11°48′39″E	Dolomites - Puez Group		Belluno/S-Tyrol	IT	1888
630	Cima Bel Pra	2917	431	46°29′04″N 12°14′28″E	Dolomites - NE	II/C-31.I-E	Belluno	IT	1880
631	Dent Favre	2917	315	46°12′37″N 07°06′14″E	Vaud Alps	I/B-12.III-A	Valais/Vaud	CH	
632	Pizzo del Diavolo di Tenda	2916	506	46°02′43″N 09°54′29″E	Bergamo Alps	II/C-29.I-A	Bergamo/Sondrio	IT	1870
633	Pointe Côte de l'Âne	2916	472	44°14′40″N 06°48′17″E	Maritime Alps	I/A-02.I-D	Alpes Maritimes	FR	
634	Maresenspitz	2916	324	47°00′15″N 13°13′49″E	Ankogel Group	II/A-17.II-F	Carinthia	AT	
635	L'Aupillon	2916	303	44°26′56″N 06°34′43″E	Southern Cottian Alps	I/A-04.I-B	A-d-H-Provence	FR	
636	Glärnisch	2915	967	46°59′42″N 08°59′43″E	Schwyz Alps	I/B-13.I-B	Glarus	CH	
637	Pflunspitze	2912	977	47°04′46″N 10°07′58″E	Verwall	II/A-15.VI-C	N-Tyrol/Vorarlb.	AT	1886
638	Cristallina	2912	344	46°27′53″N 08°32′13″E	Ticino Alps	I/B-10.II-A	Ticino	CH	
639	Beco Alto del Piz	2912	312	44°17′56″N 06°58′51″E	Maritime Alps	I/A-02.I-C	Cuneo	IT	
	Monte Torena	2911	299	46°05′18″N 10°06′11″E	Bergamo Alps	II/C-29.I-A	Bergamo/Sondrio	IT	
640	Pic du Béal Traversier	2910	550	44°45′25″N 06°41′22″E	Central Cottian Alps	I/A-04.II-B	Hautes-Alpes	FR	
641	Aiguille de Cédéra	2909	458	44°44′19″N 06°17′05″E	Massif des Écrins	I/A-05.III-C	Hautes-Alpes	FR	
642	Grande Séolane	2909	385	44°20′16″N 06°32′47″E	Provence Alps	I/A-03.1-A	A-d-H-Provence	FR	
643	Puy Gris	2908	379	45°17′45″N 06°08′46″E	Belledonne	I/A-05.II-A	Savoie	FR	
644	Pizzo Diei	2906	623	46°15′53″N 08°14′17″E	Leone-Gotthard Alps	I/B-10.I-A	V-C-O	IT	
	Les Grandes Aiguilles	2905	293	45°42′20″N 06°47′06″E	Mont Blanc massif	I/B-07.III-B	Savoie	FR	
645	Signal du Lauvitel E	2904	306	44°56′20″N 06°02′51″E	Massif des Écrins	I/A-05.III-E	Isère	FR	
646	Pic de Peyre Eyraute	2903	400	44°49′22″N 06°37′50″E	Central Cottian Alps	I/A-04.II-B	Hautes-Alpes	FR	
647	Piz Combul	2901	313	46°13′47″N 10°02′38″E	Bernina Range	II/A-15.III-A	Graub./Sondrio	CH/IT	
648	Grand Chavalard	2899	446	46°10′43″N 07°06′47″E	Vaud Alps	I/B-12.III-A	Valais	CH	
649	Becca de Nona	2898	375	45°50′23″N 07°24′58″E	Weisshorn-Matterhorn	I/B-09.II-B	Aosta Valley	IT	
650	Le Pouzenc	2898	374	44°27′33″N 06°31′01″E	Southern Cottian Alps	I/A-04.I-B	A-d-H-Provence	FR	
651	Monte Frisozzo	2897	609	46°01′28″N 10°26′57″E	Adamello-Presanella	II/C-28.III-A	Brescia	IT	1854
652	Holzgauer Wetterspitze	2895	592	47°12′23″N 10°22′10″E	Lechtal Alps	II/B-21.I-A	North Tyrol	AT	1832
653	Reinhart	2891	318	47°02′32″N 12°10′47″E	Venediger Group	II/A-17.II-A	South Tyrol	IT	1893
654	Regenstein	2891	316	46°51′38″N 12°29′26″E	Villgraten Mountains	II/A-17.III-B	East Tyrol	AT	
655	Monte Orsiera	2890	859	45°03′50″N 07°06′26″E	Central Cottian Alps	I/A-04.II-A	Turin	IT	
656	Schwarzhorn / Piz Gren	2890	355	46°40′39″N 09°01′22″E	Adula Alps	I/B-10.III-A	Graubünden	CH	
657	Monte Re di Castello	2889	312	46°01′18″N 10°29′00″E	Adamello-Presanella	II/C-28.III-A	Brescia/Trentino	IT	1854
658	Vorderseespitze	2889	310	47°11′05″N 10°22′01″E	Lechtal Alps	II/B-21.I-A	North Tyrol	AT	1855
659	Napfspitze	2888	343	46°56′13″N 11°44′22″E	Zillertal Alps	II/A-17.I-C	South Tyrol	IT	
660	Schildflue	2887	333	46°52′50″N 09°57′23″E	Silvretta	II/A-15.VI-A	Graubünden	CH	
661	Wissigstock	2887	329	46°50′44″N 08°30′24″E	Urner Alps	I/B-12.I-B	Obwalden/Uri	CH	
662	Lizumer Reckner	2886	548	47°08′38″N 11°37′51″E	Tux Alps	II/B-23.I-A	North Tyrol	AT	
663	Guggernüll	2886	377	46°31′26″N 09°16′17″E	Adula Alps	I/B-10.III-D	Graubünden	CH	
664	Le Chevalier	2886	373	44°19′50″N 06°45′33″E	Maritime Alps	I/A-02.I-C	Alpes Maritimes	FR	
664	Pizzo Recastello	2886	373	46°03′25″N 10°04′32″E	Bergamo Alps	II/C-29.I-A	Bergamo	IT	1876
666	Rietzer Grießkogel	2884	867	47°14′45″N 11°03′34″E	Stubai Alps	II/A-16.II-B	North Tyrol	AT	1829
667	Monteaviolo	2881	561	46°11′07″N 10°23′55″E	Adamello-Presanella	II/C-28.III-A	Brescia	IT	
668	Pointe de la Terrasse	2881	405	45°40′15″N 06°43′29″E	Beaufortain Massif	I/B-07.VI-A	Savoie	FR	
669	Piz Fess	2880	501	46°43′39″N 09°17′19″E	Adula Alps	I/B-10.III-C	Graubünden	CH	1895
670	Cima della Sasse (Note: Equally high Cima del Sasse & Moiazza Sud are separated by the 363 m deep Forcella delle Sasse)	2878	402	46°21′25″N 12°03′52″E	Dolomites - SE	II/C-31.II-A	Belluno	IT	
670	Moiazza Sud	2878	402	46°20′18″N 12°03′29″E	Dolomites - SE	II/C-31.II-A	Belluno	IT	1895
672	Pointe de Cloutzau	2878	329	45°00′26″N 06°44′51″E	Massif des Cerces	I/A-04.III-A	H-Alpes/Turin	FR/IT	
673	Peitlerkofel / Sas de Pütia	2875	638	46°39′32″N 11°49′12″E	Dolomites - NW	II/C-31.III-A	South Tyrol	IT	1885
674	Eisentälispitze	2875	386	46°54′48″N 09°57′45″E	Silvretta	II/A-15.VI-A	Vorarlb/Graub.	AT/CH	1892
675	Schwalbenkofel	2873	328	46°39′08″N 12°16′13″E	Sexten Dolomites	II/C-31.I-A	South Tyrol	IT	
676	Monte Carbonè	2873	309	44°09′37″N 07°25′50″E	Maritime Alps	I/A-02.I-A	Cuneo	IT	
677	Monte Agnèr	2872	542	46°16′35″N 11°57′10″E	Dolomites - S	II/C-31.IV-A	Belluno	IT	1875
678	Mont Bégo	2872	323	44°04′26″N 07°27′03″E	Maritime Alps	I/A-02.I-A	Alpes Maritimes	FR	
679	Tête des Vieux (Note: A point 2978 on the old Italian topographic maps, between Tête des Vieux (2873 m) and Têtes de Jeunes (2785 m), has been copied by the Swiss and French topographic maps, but is not supported by the SRTM data and is absent from the Carta Tecnica Regionale of 2005. It probably was a typo for 2778.)	2871	324	45°45′32″N 06°56′06″E	Mont Blanc massif	I/B-07.III-B	Aosta Valley	IT	
680	Grand Aréa	2869	442	44°58′48″N 06°34′24″E	Massif des Cerces	I/A-04.III-A	Hautes-Alpes	FR	
681	Kolbenspitze	2868	367	46°46′22″N 11°08′52″E	Ötztal Alps	II/A-16.I-B	South Tyrol	IT	
682	Punta Cornour	2868	417	44°51′02″N 07°05′35″E	Central Cottian Alps	I/A-04.II-A	Turin	IT	1836
683	Tête de Gaulent	2867	350	44°43′08″N 06°31′32″E	Massif des Écrins	I/A-05.III-C	Hautes-Alpes	FR	
684	Nufenenstock	2866	381	46°28′01″N 08°23′18″E	Leone-Gotthard Alps	I/B-10.I-A	Ticino/Valais	CH	
685	Rocher de Plassa	2865	409	45°22′23″N 06°41′21″E	Vanoise Massif	I/B-07.II-E	Savoie	FR	
686	Triglav	2864	2048	46°22′41″N 13°50′13″E	Julian Alps	II/C-34.I-E	West Slovenia	SI	1778
687	Pala di Meduce	2864	304	46°30′07″N 12°17′51″E	Dolomites - NE	II/C-31.I-E	Belluno	IT	1890
688	Poncione di Braga	2864	301	46°26′03″N 08°32′34″E	Ticino Alps	I/B-10.II-A	Ticino	CH	
689	Wandfluhhorn / Pizzo Biela	2863	452	46°20′41″N 08°27′51″E	Ticino Alps	I/B-10.II-A	Ticino/V-C-O	CH/IT	
690	Hochgolling	2862	1124	47°15′58″N 13°45′40″E	Niedere Tauern	II/A-18.II-A	Salzburg/Styria	AT	1791
691	Cima de Barna	2862	314	46°25′14″N 09°15′49″E	Adula Alps	I/B-10.III-D	Graub./Sondrio	CH/IT	
692	Le Taillefer	2857	1490	45°02′23″N 05°55′28″E	Taillefer Massif	I/A-05.IV-A	Isère	FR	
693	Gstellihorn	2855	366	46°39′44″N 08°10′29″E	Vaud Alps	I/B-12.III-A	Bern	CH	1836
694	Piz di Sassiglion	2855	313	46°19′22″N 10°06′45″E	Livigno Alps	II/A-15.IV-B	Graub./Sondrio	CH/IT	
695	Petite Séolane	2854	317	44°21′27″N 06°31′48″E	Provence Alps	I/A-03.1-A	A-d-H-Provence	FR	
696	Cima Ciantiplagna	2849	673	45°04′20″N 07°00′48″E	Central Cottian Alps	I/A-04.II-A	Turin	IT	
697	Croda Granda	2849	492	46°14′55″N 11°55′43″E	Dolomites - S	II/C-31.IV-A	Belluno	IT	1883
698	Cima d'Asta	2847	939	46°10′36″N 11°36′19″E	Fiemme Alps	II/C-31.V-B	Trentino	IT	1816
699	Punta Nera	2847	431	46°30′59″N 12°11′30″E	Dolomites - NE	II/C-31.I-D	Belluno	IT	1876
700	Cima del Desenigo	2845	369	46°12′06″N 09°33′42″E	Bregaglia Range	II/A-15.III-B	Sondrio	IT	
701	Pizol	2844	457	46°57′33″N 09°23′12″E	Glarus Alps	I/B-13.II-A	St. Gallen	CH	1864
702	Punta Charrà /Sommet du Charra	2844	363	45°01′17″N 06°42′37″E	Massif des Cerces	I/A-04.III-A	H-Alpes/Turin	FR/IT	
703	Weissfluh	2843	497	46°50′06″N 09°47′43″E	Plessur Alps	II/A-15.VII-A	Graubünden	CH	
704	Pic de Beaudouis	2843	366	44°50′11″N 06°41′40″E	Central Cottian Alps	I/A-04.II-B	Hautes-Alpes	FR	
705	Schneekarkopf	2843	307	47°08′28″N 12°02′08″E	Zillertal Alps	II/A-17.I-D	North Tyrol	AT	
	Cornone di Blumone	2843	295	45°57′17″N 10°27′21″E	Adamello-Presanella	II/C-28.III-A	Brescia	IT	1878
706	Latemar (Diamantiditurm)	2842	1097	46°22′52″N 11°34′31″E	Fiemme Alps	II/C-31.V-A	S-Tyrol/Trentino	IT	1885
707	Cima di Gana Bianca	2842	410	46°28′17″N 08°59′32″E	Adula Alps	I/B-10.III-B	Ticino	CH	
708	Kirchdachspitze	2840	470	47°04′02″N 11°20′31″E	Stubai Alps	II/A-16.II-A	North Tyrol	AT	
709	Dürrenstein	2839	880	46°40′21″N 12°11′07″E	Dolomites - NE	II/C-31.I-B	South Tyrol	IT	
710	Cima Cadin di San Lucano	2839	663	46°34′39″N 12°17′17″E	Sexten Dolomites	II/C-31.I-A	Belluno	IT	
711	Grand Cheval de Bois	2838	424	44°17′33″N 06°38′02″E	Maritime Alps	I/A-02.I-E	A-d-H-Provence	FR	
712	Kärlskopf	2836	631	46°53′19″N 12°14′10″E	Villgraten Mountains	II/A-17.III-B	E-Tyrol/S-Tyrol	AT/IT	
713	Tête du Clotonnet	2835	335	44°50′34″N 06°06′04″E	Massif des Écrins	I/A-05.III-D	Isère/H-Alpes	FR	
714	Gamskarlspitz	2833	374	47°02′13″N 13°09′45″E	Ankogel Group	II/A-17.II-F	Carinth/Salzburg	AT	
715	Cheval Noir	2832	507	45°25′19″N 06°24′50″E	Vanoise Massif	I/B-07.II-E	Savoie	FR	
716	Rocca la Meja	2831	437	44°23′54″N 07°04′08″E	Southern Cottian Alps	I/A-04.I-A	Cuneo	IT	
717	Drei Türme / Drusentürme	2830	628	47°01′29″N 09°48′36″E	Rätikon	II/A-15.VIII-A	Vorarlberg	AT	
	Aiguille de Venosc	2830	299	44°58′05″N 06°05′14″E	Massif des Écrins	I/A-05.III-E	Isère	FR	
718	Grand Pic de la Lauzière	2829	836	45°27′33″N 06°22′00″E	Vanoise Massif	I/B-07.II-F	Savoie	FR	
719	Pirchkogel	2828	300	47°13′55″N 10°59′57″E	Stubai Alps	II/A-16.II-B	North Tyrol	AT	
720	Große Schlenkerspitze	2827	445	47°14′56″N 10°36′55″E	Lechtal Alps	II/B-21.I-A	North Tyrol	AT	1882
721	Graunock	2827	419	46°53′10″N 11°47′20″E	Zillertal Alps	II/A-17.I-B	South Tyrol	IT	
722	Cime de Bolofré	2827	308	44°13′23″N 06°50′07″E	Maritime Alps	I/A-02.I-D	Alpes Maritimes	FR	
723	Madrisahorn	2826	600	46°55′52″N 09°52′20″E	Rätikon	II/A-15.VIII-A	Graubünden	CH	
724	Kalkwand	2826	342	47°09′14″N 11°39′42″E	Tux Alps	II/B-23.I-B	North Tyrol	AT	
725	Grand Perron des Encombres	2824	442	45°17′52″N 06°27′01″E	Vanoise Massif	I/B-07.II-E	Savoie	FR	
726	Tête de l'Hivernet	2824	330	44°37′12″N 06°27′11″E	Massif des Écrins	I/A-05.III-C	Hautes-Alpes	FR	
727	Hoher Herd	2824	313	47°11′58″N 12°27′00″E	Venediger Group	II/A-17.II-A	Salzburg	AT	
728	Hochmaderer	2823	318	46°55′43″N 10°01′43″E	Silvretta	II/A-15.VI-A	Vorarlberg	AT	1853
729	Le Bellachat	2822	351	45°22′47″N 06°23′49″E	Vanoise Massif	I/B-07.II-E	Savoie	FR	
	Riedbock (Note: The key col is the Riekentörl, which in all literature is 2525 m, although SRTM and BEV map contours suggest it is above 2540 m.)	2822	297	46°55′43″N 13°21′24″E	Ankogel Group	II/A-17.II-F	Carinthia	AT	
730	Monfandì	2820	405	45°31′19″N 07°37′10″E	Gran Paradiso Alps	I/B-07.IV-B	Turin	IT	
731	Sulzfluh	2818	475	47°00′45″N 09°50′23″E	Rätikon	II/A-15.VIII-A	Vorarlb/Graub.	AT/CH	1782
732	Mont Mounier	2817	613	44°09′17″N 06°58′21″E	Maritime Alps	I/A-02.I-D	Alpes Maritimes	FR	
733	Dosso Resaccio	2814	519	46°30′04″N 10°13′12″E	Livigno Alps	II/A-15.IV-B	Sondrio	IT	
734	Sass Maòr	2814	371	46°13′57″N 11°50′53″E	Dolomites - S	II/C-31.IV-A	Trentino	IT	1875
735	Vallüla	2813	776	46°56′15″N 10°06′45″E	Silvretta	II/A-15.VI-A	N-Tyrol/Vorarlb.	AT	1866
736	Cima delle Lose	2813	352	44°22′20″N 06°55′30″E	Maritime Alps	I/A-02.I-C	Cuneo	IT	
737	Frate della Meia	2812	387	45°45′32″N 07°55′27″E	Monte Rosa Alps	I/B-09.III-C	Vercelli	IT	
738	Seekofel / Sas dla Porta	2810	478	46°40′30″N 12°04′21″E	Dolomites - NE	II/C-31.I-B	Belluno/S-Tyrol	IT	
739	Valluga	2809	572	47°09′27″N 10°12′47″E	Lechtal Alps	II/B-21.I-A	N-Tyrol/Vorarlb.	AT	1877
740	Monte Campellio	2809	315	46°03′05″N 10°28′38″E	Adamello-Presanella	II/C-28.III-A	Brescia/Trentino	IT	
741	Peiderspitze (Note: Equally high Seejoch and Peiderspitze are 1.5 km apart and separated by a 217 m deep saddle.)	2808	408	47°13′11″N 11°07′18″E	Stubai Alps	II/A-16.II-B	North Tyrol	AT	1888
741	Seejoch	2808	408	47°13′28″N 11°06′11″E	Stubai Alps	II/A-16.II-B	North Tyrol	AT	1888
743	Pizzo Castello	2808	385	46°24′56″N 08°33′55″E	Ticino Alps	I/B-10.II-A	Ticino	CH	
744	Pic du Frêne	2807	521	45°21′09″N 06°11′54″E	Belledonne	I/A-05.II-A	Isère/Savoie	FR	
745	Haldensteiner Calanda	2805	1460	46°54′00″N 09°28′03″E	Glarus Alps	I/B-13.II-B	Graub./StGallen	CH	1559
746	Cima de Gagela	2805	723	46°23′03″N 09°10′29″E	Adula Alps	I/B-10.III-B	Graubünden	CH	
747	Tête à l'Âne	2804	540	45°59′14″N 06°46′47″E	Chablais Alps	I/B-08.II-A	Haute-Savoie	FR	
748	Corona di Redorta	2804	481	46°22′32″N 08°43′56″E	Ticino Alps	I/B-10.II-D	Ticino	CH	
749	Schlicker Seespitze	2804	327	47°08′44″N 11°16′24″E	Stubai Alps	II/A-16.II-B	North Tyrol	AT	1879
750	Bös Fulen	2802	367	46°58′02″N 08°56′45″E	Schwyz Alps	I/B-13.I-B	Glarus/Schwyz	CH	
751	Cima di Ball	2802	352	46°14′35″N 11°50′40″E	Dolomites - S	II/C-31.IV-A	Trentino	IT	1869
752	Corno Mud	2802	317	45°53′04″N 07°57′50″E	Monte Rosa Alps	I/B-09.III-C	Vercelli	IT	
753	Rollspitze	2800	588	46°56′47″N 11°30′28″E	Zillertal Alps	II/A-17.I-A	South Tyrol	IT	
754	Rosenjoch	2796	466	47°10′48″N 11°32′36″E	Tux Alps	II/B-23.I-A	North Tyrol	AT	
755	Col Bechei / Pareispitze	2794	622	46°36′28″N 12°02′40″E	Dolomites - NE	II/C-31.I-C	Belluno/S-Tyrol	IT	
756	Kärpf	2794	533	46°55′00″N 09°05′36″E	Glarus Alps	I/B-13.II-A	Glarus	CH	
757	Drättehorn	2794	340	46°34′56″N 07°49′26″E	Bernese Prealps	I/B-14.II-B	Bern	CH	
758	Pizzo Quadro	2793	470	46°17′55″N 08°25′05″E	Ticino Alps	I/B-10.II-A	Ticino/V-C-O	CH/IT	
759	Grand Armet	2792	920	44°58′55″N 05°56′04″E	Taillefer Massif	I/A-05.IV-A	Isère	FR	
760	Punta Ciamberline	2792	325	44°09′56″N 07°21′29″E	Maritime Alps	I/A-02.I-B	Cuneo	IT	
761	Grande Tête de l'Obiou	2790	1542	44°46′29″N 05°50′23″E	Dauphiné Prealps	I/A-06.I-B	Isère	FR	
762	Pizzo Marumo	2790	435	46°35′54″N 08°57′34″E	Adula Alps	I/B-10.III-A	Ticino	CH	
763	Muntejela de Senes	2787	456	46°40′18″N 12°01′06″E	Dolomites - NE	II/C-31.I-B	South Tyrol	IT	
764	Le Luisin	2786	324	46°07′15″N 06°58′12″E	Chablais Alps	I/B-08.II-A	Valais	CH	
765	Polinik	2784	1575	46°53′42″N 13°09′29″E	Kreuzeck Group	II/A-17.IV-A	Carinthia	AT	
766	Schrotkopf	2784	430	47°12′32″N 12°32′26″E	Granatspitze Group	II/A-17.II-B	Salzburg	AT	
767	Grande Autane	2782	379	44°38′57″N 06°17′16″E	Massif des Écrins	I/A-05.III-C	Hautes-Alpes	FR	
768	Hirzer	2781	751	46°44′14″N 11°16′36″E	Sarntal Alps	II/A-16.III-A	South Tyrol	IT	
769	Tiejer Flue	2781	345	46°46′51″N 09°44′04″E	Plessur Alps	II/A-15.VII-B	Graubünden	CH	
770	Hohe Warte / Coglians	2780	1144	46°36′25″N 12°52′59″E	Carnic Alps	II/C-33.I-A	Carinthia/Udine	AT/IT	1865
771	Monte dei Corni	2779	315	45°34′15″N 07°38′09″E	Gran Paradiso Alps	I/B-07.IV-B	Aosta/Turin	IT	
772	Monte Cassorso	2776	339	44°25′04″N 07°01′05″E	Southern Cottian Alps	I/A-04.I-A	Cuneo	IT	
773	Grun de Saint-Maurice	2775	323	44°48′58″N 06°03′26″E	Massif des Écrins	I/A-05.III-D	Isère/H-Alpes	FR	
774	Imster Muttekopf	2774	300	47°16′02″N 10°39′06″E	Lechtal Alps	II/B-21.I-A	North Tyrol	AT	
775	Pizzo del Sole	2773	555	46°31′30″N 08°46′04″E	Leone-Gotthard Alps	I/B-10.I-B	Ticino	CH	
776	Punta Lunella	2772	471	45°11′50″N 07°12′59″E	Graian Alps - SE	I/B-07.I-A	Turin	IT	1873
777	Große Sandspitze	2770	1245	46°45′59″N 12°48′43″E	Gailtal Alps	II/C-33.II-B	East Tyrol	AT	1866
778	Madererspitze	2769	495	47°01′30″N 10°04′11″E	Verwall	II/A-15.VI-C	Vorarlberg	AT	1865
779	Fallesinspitze	2769	465	47°10′53″N 10°18′01″E	Lechtal Alps	II/B-21.I-A	North Tyrol	AT	
	Hochsteinflache	2769	294	47°09′32″N 11°59′52″E	Zillertal Alps	II/A-17.I-D	North Tyrol	AT	
780	Hochplattig	2768	1189	47°21′11″N 10°59′19″E	Mieminger Chain	II/B-21.III-A	North Tyrol	AT	1873
781	Il Madone (Note: High point between Il Madone and Campanile.)	2768	330	46°29′31″N 08°34′01″E	Ticino Alps	I/B-10.II-A	Ticino	CH	
782	Dristner	2767	313	47°06′48″N 11°50′22″E	Zillertal Alps	II/A-17.I-B	North Tyrol	AT	1843
783	Schwarzkopf	2765	365	47°10′01″N 12°51′39″E	Glockner Group	II/A-17.II-C	Salzburg	AT	
784	Schächentaler Windgällen	2764	691	46°53′17″N 08°47′30″E	Schwyz Alps	I/B-14.IV-A	Uri	CH	
785	Schwarzberg / Piz Nair	2764	343	46°36′34″N 08°40′40″E	Leone-Gotthard Alps	I/B-10.I-B	Graubünden/Uri	CH	
786	Albristhorn	2763	823	46°29′53″N 07°29′16″E	Bernese Prealps	I/B-14.II-A	Bern	CH	
787	Rotenkogel	2762	555	46°58′48″N 12°35′56″E	Granatspitze Group	II/A-17.II-B	East Tyrol	AT	
788	Rastkogel	2762	470	47°12′15″N 11°45′04″E	Tux Alps	II/B-23.I-B	North Tyrol	AT	
789	Pizzo Massari	2760	424	46°28′33″N 08°41′00″E	Ticino Alps	I/B-10.II-A	Ticino	CH	
790	Dent de Barme	2759	364	46°07′55″N 06°50′31″E	Chablais Alps	I/B-08.II-A	Valais/Haute-Savoie	CH/FR	
791	Grand Ferrand	2758	523	44°43′21″N 05°48′58″E	Dauphiné Prealps	I/A-06.I-B	Isère/H-Alpes	FR	1873
792	Reeti / Rötihorn	2757	341	46°39′54″N 08°00′42″E	Bernese Prealps	I/B-14.II-B	Bern	CH	
793	Ehrenspitze	2756	347	46°45′50″N 11°04′40″E	Ötztal Alps	II/A-16.I-B	South Tyrol	IT	
794	Roche de l'Abisse/Rocca dell'Abisso	2755	492	44°08′37″N 07°30′18″E	Maritime Alps	I/A-02.I-A	A-Marit/Cuneo	FR/IT	1832
795	Cima di Cece	2754	736	46°15′39″N 11°41′02″E	Fiemme Alps	II/C-31.V-B	Trentino	IT	
796	Monte Telenek	2754	440	46°05′33″N 10°10′45″E	Bergamo Alps	II/C-29.I-A	Sondrio	IT	
797	Jôf dal Montâs	2753	1597	46°26′09″N 13°26′01″E	Julian Alps	II/C-34.I-A	Udine	IT	1877
798	Untere Wildgrubenspitze	2753	980	47°09′54″N 10°07′35″E	Lechtal Alps	II/B-21.I-A	Vorarlberg	AT	
799	Östliche Eisentalerspitze	2753	358	47°04′47″N 10°06′00″E	Verwall	II/A-15.VI-C	Vorarlberg	AT	
800	Pic de Valsenestre	2752	484	44°53′12″N 06°04′03″E	Massif des Écrins	I/A-05.III-E	Isère	FR	
801	Cima di Quaira / Karspitze	2752	303	46°18′31″N 10°36′51″E	Ortler Alps	II/C-28.I-A	S-Tyrol/Trentino	IT	
802	Pointe Percée	2750	1643	45°57′20″N 06°33′22″E	Aravis Range	I/B-08.IV-A	Haute-Savoie	FR	1865
803	Birkkarspitze	2749	1564	47°24′40″N 11°26′16″E	Karwendel	II/B-21.IV-A	North Tyrol	AT	1870
804	Alplerspitz / Mardatsch	2748	321	46°45′42″N 11°18′04″E	Sarntal Alps	II/A-16.III-A	South Tyrol	IT	
805	Sommet de La Frema	2747	702	44°09′07″N 06°41′55″E	Maritime Alps	I/A-02.I-E	A-d-H-Provence	FR	
806	Hochwildstelle	2747	480	47°20′06″N 13°49′51″E	Niedere Tauern	II/A-18.II-A	Styria	AT	1801
807	Siahuare / Corno del Lago	2747	405	45°40′15″N 07°46′59″E	Monte Rosa Alps	I/B-09.III-B	Aosta Valley	IT	
808	Hochwart	2746	308	46°47′27″N 11°19′08″E	Sarntal Alps	II/A-16.III-A	South Tyrol	IT	
809	Cima Bocche	2745	714	46°21′15″N 11°45′08″E	Dolomites - NW	II/C-31.III-B	Trentino	IT	
810	Jakobsspitze	2745	531	46°45′47″N 11°29′30″E	Sarntal Alps	II/A-16.III-A	South Tyrol	IT	
811	Sadnig	2745	385	46°56′28″N 12°59′21″E	Goldberg Group	II/A-17.II-E	Carinthia	AT	
812	Hochwanner	2744	699	47°23′46″N 11°03′21″E	Wetterstein	II/B-21.III-B	N-Tyrol/Bavaria	AT/DE	1870
813	Roteck	2742	444	47°13′48″N 13°51′02″E	Niedere Tauern	II/A-18.II-A	Salzburg/Styria	AT	
814	Ärmighore	2742	332	46°32′30″N 07°42′49″E	Bernese Prealps	I/B-14.II-B	Bern	CH	
815	Madom Gröss	2741	630	46°22′00″N 08°49′52″E	Ticino Alps	I/B-10.II-D	Ticino	CH	
816	Cima Carnera	2741	319	45°51′18″N 07°58′13″E	Monte Rosa Alps	I/B-09.III-C	Vercelli	IT	
817	Škrlatica	2740	972	46°25′58″N 13°49′16″E	Julian Alps	II/C-34.I-E	West Slovenia	SI	1880
818	Kasereck	2740	425	47°14′15″N 13°46′18″E	Niedere Tauern	II/A-18.II-A	Salzburg	AT	
819	Schenadüi	2738	375	46°33′09″N 08°44′55″E	Leone-Gotthard Alps	I/B-10.I-B	Ticino	CH	
820	Spitzhorli	2737	320	46°15′52″N 07°58′50″E	Weissmies Alps	I/B-09.V-C	Valais	CH	
821	Monte Zucchero	2735	554	46°21′15″N 08°42′51″E	Ticino Alps	I/B-10.II-D	Ticino	CH	
822	Kaltwasserkarspitze	2733	320	47°24′11″N 11°27′02″E	Karwendel	II/B-21.IV-A	North Tyrol	AT	1870
823	Dremelspitze	2733	307	47°14′06″N 10°35′45″E	Lechtal Alps	II/B-21.I-A	North Tyrol	AT	1896
824	Pic des Cabottes	2732	548	45°14′31″N 06°03′50″E	Belledonne	I/A-05.II-A	Isère	FR	
825	Clot de la Cime	2732	312	44°49′00″N 06°43′19″E	Central Cottian Alps	I/A-04.II-B	Hautes-Alpes	FR	
826	Monte Borga	2731	325	46°05′35″N 10°12′30″E	Bergamo Alps	II/C-29.I-A	Sondrio	IT	
827	Monte Zerbion	2730	317	45°47′18″N 07°39′50″E	Monte Rosa Alps	I/B-09.III-B	Aosta Valley	IT	
828	Le Grand Coin	2729	328	45°20′46″N 06°24′08″E	Vanoise Massif	I/B-07.II-E	Savoie	FR	
829	Kesselspitze	2728	323	47°06′02″N 11°21′53″E	Stubai Alps	II/A-16.II-A	North Tyrol	AT	
830	Bergwerkskopf (Note: The key col "Verborgene Gratscharte" is variably given as 2414, 2420 and 2425 m, though the BEV map contour lines appear to indicate > 2440 m.)	2728	310	47°13′30″N 10°36′33″E	Lechtal Alps	II/B-21.I-A	North Tyrol	AT	1885
831	Sas de Mezdi / La Mesola	2727	488	46°28′19″N 11°52′39″E	Dolomites - NW	II/C-31.III-B	Belluno/Trentino	IT	
832	Pizzo di Claro	2727	361	46°17′45″N 09°03′20″E	Adula Alps	I/B-10.III-B	Graub./Ticino	CH/IT	
833	Pizzo di Prata	2727	352	46°16′39″N 09°27′20″E	Bregaglia Range	II/A-15.III-B	Sondrio	IT	
834	Großer Bettelwurf	2726	814	47°20′39″N 11°31′12″E	Karwendel	II/B-21.IV-A	North Tyrol	AT	1855
835	Hirzer	2725	339	47°13′04″N 11°39′47″E	Tux Alps	II/B-23.I-B	North Tyrol	AT	
836	Schmalzkopf	2724	327	46°55′53″N 10°32′09″E	Ötztal Alps	II/A-16.I-A	North Tyrol	AT	
837	Weiße Wand	2722	315	46°56′45″N 11°48′49″E	Zillertal Alps	II/A-17.I-C	South Tyrol	IT	
838	Hochwand	2719	402	47°21′31″N 11°00′57″E	Mieminger Chain	II/B-21.III-A	North Tyrol	AT	1873
839	Spitzkofel	2717	457	46°46′20″N 12°44′36″E	Gailtal Alps	II/C-33.II-B	East Tyrol	AT	1855
840	Serles	2717	333	47°07′26″N 11°22′52″E	Stubai Alps	II/A-16.II-A	North Tyrol	AT	1579
841	Ortstock	2716	538	46°55′31″N 08°56′53″E	Schwyz Alps	I/B-13.I-A	Glarus/Schwyz	CH	
	Valisera	2716	293	46°57′39″N 09°57′21″E	Silvretta	II/A-15.VI-A	Vorarlberg	AT	
842	Cima Ambrizzola	2715	610	46°28′45″N 12°05′53″E	Dolomites - NE	II/C-31.I-D	Belluno	IT	1884
843	Colàc	2715	377	46°26′29″N 11°46′57″E	Dolomites - NW	II/C-31.III-B	Trentino	IT	
844	Watzmann	2713	953	47°33′18″N 12°55′23″E	Berchtesgaden Alps	II/B-24.III-C	Bavaria	DE	1800
845	Pizzo Straciugo	2713	335	46°07′56″N 08°07′15″E	Weissmies Alps	I/B-09.V-B	Valais/V-C-O	CH/IT	
846	Croda da Campo	2712	365	46°35′22″N 12°26′03″E	Sexten Dolomites	II/C-31.I-A	Belluno	IT	
847	Weißeck	2711	451	47°09′45″N 13°23′39″E	Niedere Tauern	II/A-18.I-A	Salzburg	AT	
848	Mont Saint-Sauveur	2711	369	44°09′53″N 07°08′08″E	Maritime Alps	I/A-02.I-B	Alpes Maritimes	FR	
849	Mont Gond	2710	395	46°17′08″N 07°15′49″E	Vaud Alps	I/B-12.III-A	Valais	CH	
850	Pic de Bure	2709	1267	44°37′36″N 05°56′06″E	Dauphiné Prealps	I/A-06.I-A	Hautes-Alpes	FR	
851	Hochkreuz	2709	300	46°48′54″N 13°04′27″E	Kreuzeck Group	II/A-17.IV-A	Carinthia	AT	
852	Gsür	2708	372	46°30′39″N 07°31′11″E	Bernese Prealps	I/B-14.II-A	Bern	CH	
853	Coston di Slavaci	2708	315	46°15′44″N 11°43′01″E	Fiemme Alps	II/C-31.V-B	Trentino	IT	
854	Cima dei Preti	2706	1420	46°20′33″N 12°25′15″E	Carnic Prealps	II/C-33.III-A	Bell./Pordenone	IT	1874
855	Penser Weißhorn	2705	458	46°48′07″N 11°23′44″E	Sarntal Alps	II/A-16.III-A	South Tyrol	IT	1822
856	Pizzo Montalto	2705	395	46°05′51″N 08°07′59″E	Weissmies Alps	I/B-09.V-B	V-C-O	IT	
857	Rote Wand	2704	877	47°11′11″N 09°59′06″E	Lechquellen Mts	II/B-21.II-A	Vorarlberg	AT	1867
858	Monte Fraiteve	2702	403	44°58′38″N 06°51′41″E	Central Cottian Alps	I/A-04.II-A	Turin	IT	
859	Waldhorn	2702	392	47°17′46″N 13°49′03″E	Niedere Tauern	II/A-18.II-A	Salzburg/Styria	AT	1878
860	Rotsandnollen	2700	493	46°48′02″N 08°20′38″E	Urner Alps	I/B-14.III-B	Nidwalden/Obw.	CH	
861	Cima Iuribrutto	2697	316	46°21′33″N 11°45′55″E	Dolomites - NW	II/C-31.III-B	Trentino	IT	
862	Großer Lafatscher	2696	615	47°20′44″N 11°27′10″E	Karwendel	II/B-21.IV-A	North Tyrol	AT	1867
863	Monte Peralba	2694	725	46°37′46″N 12°43′10″E	Carnic Alps	II/C-33.I-A	Belluno	IT	1854
864	Piz de Groven	2694	433	46°19′06″N 09°09′33″E	Adula Alps	I/B-10.III-B	Graubünden	CH	
865	Grand Coyer	2693	421	44°06′02″N 06°41′25″E	Maritime Alps	I/A-02.I-E	A-d-H-Provence	FR	
866	Tête du Colonney	2692	521	45°58′18″N 06°41′27″E	Chablais Alps	I/B-08.II-B	Haute-Savoie	FR	
867	Ilmspitze	2692	300	47°03′26″N 11°19′49″E	Stubai Alps	II/A-16.II-A	North Tyrol	AT	1891
868	Große Kinigat / Monte Cavallino	2689	595	46°40′31″N 12°31′28″E	Carnic Alps	II/C-33.I-A	E-Tyrol/Belluno	AT/IT	1898
869	Piz Pian Grand	2689	528	46°25′03″N 09°09′20″E	Adula Alps	I/B-10.III-B	Graubünden	CH	
870	Aiguilles de la Pennaz	2688	359	45°44′42″N 06°41′58″E	Beaufortain Massif	I/B-07.VI-B	Savoie/Haute-Savoie	FR	
871	Hochfeind	2687	572	47°11′14″N 13°29′42″E	Niedere Tauern	II/A-18.I-A	Salzburg	AT	
	Schwabenalpenkopf	2687	296	46°38′43″N 12°17′12″E	Sexten Dolomites	II/C-31.I-A	South Tyrol	IT	
872	Grand Mont	2686	577	45°37′55″N 06°32′14″E	Beaufortain Massif	I/B-07.VI-A	Savoie	FR	
873	Cima del Serraglio	2685	350	46°35′34″N 10°14′32″E	Ortler Alps	II/A-15.V-A	Graub./Sondrio	CH/IT	
874	Deichselspitze	2684	385	47°16′13″N 13°49′20″E	Niedere Tauern	II/A-18.II-A	Salzburg/Styria	AT	
875	Chapeau de Gendarme	2682	368	44°20′18″N 06°39′57″E	Maritime Alps	I/A-02.I-C	Alpes Maritimes	FR	
876	Leutascher Dreitorspitze	2682	346	47°24′02″N 11°07′28″E	Wetterstein	II/B-21.III-B	N-Tyrol/Bavaria	AT/DE	1871
877	Hochstadel	2681	386	46°45′36″N 12°51′26″E	Gailtal Alps	II/C-33.II-B	Carinthia/E-Tyrol	AT	
878	Mosermandl	2680	555	47°12′22″N 13°23′46″E	Niedere Tauern	II/A-18.I-A	Salzburg	AT	
879	Mangart	2679	1067	46°26′22″N 13°39′17″E	Julian Alps	II/C-34.I-C	Udine/Slovenia	IT/SI	1794
880	Spullerschafberg	2679	670	47°10′26″N 10°04′33″E	Lechquellen Mts	II/B-21.II-A	Vorarlberg	AT	
881	Punta Tempesta	2679	309	44°25′19″N 07°08′18″E	Southern Cottian Alps	I/A-04.I-A	Cuneo	IT	
882	Cima di Santa Maria	2678	436	46°12′46″N 10°57′03″E	Brenta Dolomites	II/C-28.IV-A	Trentino	IT	
883	Gaflunakopf	2676	351	47°03′50″N 10°08′05″E	Verwall	II/A-15.VI-C	N-Tyrol/Vorarlb.	AT	
884	Piz della Forcola	2675	449	46°18′59″N 09°17′36″E	Adula Alps	I/B-10.III-D	Graub./Sondrio	CH/IT	
885	Mont Pépoiri	2674	643	44°06′39″N 07°12′10″E	Maritime Alps	I/A-02.I-B	Alpes Maritimes	FR	
886	Mont Rougnous	2673	465	44°11′03″N 06°52′26″E	Maritime Alps	I/A-02.I-D	Alpes Maritimes	FR	
887	Elendberg	2672	346	47°17′02″N 13°44′49″E	Niedere Tauern	II/A-18.II-A	Styria	AT	
888	Ballunspitze	2671	400	46°57′19″N 10°08′06″E	Silvretta	II/A-15.VI-A	N-Tyrol/Vorarlb.	AT	1861
889	Stübele / Stubele	2671	384	46°28′04″N 10°56′12″E	Ortler Alps	II/C-28.I-A	S-Tyrol/Trentino	IT	
890	Sas Ciampac/Ciampatsch	2671	305	46°33′47″N 11°50′07″E	Dolomites - NW	II/C-31.III-A	South Tyrol	IT	
891	Le Grand Miceau	2669	300	45°22′16″N 06°12′44″E	Belledonne	I/A-05.II-A	Savoie	FR	
892	Monte Duranno (Note: Commonly given a height of 2,652 m. This is the height of the top of the north face. The true summit is 100 m SSE.)	2668	510	46°19′44″N 12°24′10″E	Carnic Prealps	II/C-33.III-A	Bell./Pordenone	IT	1874
893	Südliche Sonnenspitze	2668	325	47°23′12″N 11°28′40″E	Karwendel	II/B-21.IV-A	North Tyrol	AT	1870
894	Jôf Fuart	2666	528	46°25′50″N 13°29′29″E	Julian Alps	II/C-34.I-A	Udine	IT	
895	Les Avoudrues	2666	385	46°06′04″N 06°48′47″E	Chablais Alps	I/B-08.II-B	Haute-Savoie	FR	
896	Monte Bruffione	2665	350	45°56′32″N 10°29′29″E	Adamello-Presanella	II/C-28.III-A	Brescia/Trentino	IT	
897	Monte Cernera	2664	304	46°28′08″N 12°03′30″E	Dolomites - NE	II/C-31.I-D	Belluno	IT	
898	Toblacher Pfannhorn	2663	337	46°47′02″N 12°17′03″E	Villgraten Mountains	II/A-17.III-B	E-Tyrol/S-Tyrol	AT/IT	
899	Hohe Munde	2662	603	47°20′52″N 11°04′19″E	Mieminger Chain	II/B-21.III-A	North Tyrol	AT	
900	Grünstein	2661	389	47°20′56″N 10°55′17″E	Mieminger Chain	II/B-21.III-A	North Tyrol	AT	
901	Pointe Rousse des Chambres	2660	322	46°06′46″N 06°49′13″E	Chablais Alps	I/B-08.II-B	Haute-Savoie	FR	
902	Pizzo Giezza	2658	555	46°10′45″N 08°11′48″E	Weissmies Alps	I/B-09.V-B	V-C-O	IT	
903	Piz Toissa	2657	310	46°37′07″N 09°31′30″E	Oberhalbstein Range	II/A-15.I-B	Graubünden	CH	
904	Großer Krottenkopf	2656	996	47°18′42″N 10°21′21″E	Allgäu Alps	II/B-22.II-C	North Tyrol	AT	1864
905	Ilmenspitze /Cima degli Olmi	2656	312	46°28′55″N 10°57′50″E	Ortler Alps	II/C-28.I-A	S-Tyrol/Trentino	IT	
906	Selbhorn	2655	409	47°26′49″N 12°57′49″E	Berchtesgaden Alps	II/B-24.III-A	Salzburg	AT	
907	Sommet du Guiau	2654	442	45°01′12″N 06°40′25″E	Massif des Cerces	I/A-04.III-A	H-Alpes/Turin	FR/IT	
908	Faulkogel	2654	350	47°12′58″N 13°22′21″E	Niedere Tauern	II/A-18.I-A	Salzburg	AT	
909	Schönfeldspitze	2653	384	47°27′29″N 12°56′15″E	Berchtesgaden Alps	II/B-24.III-A	Salzburg	AT	
	Tullen	2653	296	46°39′13″N 11°46′30″E	Dolomites - NW	II/C-31.III-A	South Tyrol	IT	
910	Männliflue	2652	374	46°33′05″N 07°32′47″E	Bernese Prealps	I/B-14.II-A	Bern	CH	
911	Hohes Licht	2651	678	47°16′49″N 10°16′34″E	Allgäu Alps	II/B-22.II-C	North Tyrol	AT	1854
912	Punta Marguareis	2650	779	44°10′26″N 07°41′04″E	Ligurian Alps	I/A-01.II-B	A-Marit/Cuneo	FR/IT	
913	Le Chenaillet	2650	496	44°54′08″N 06°44′26″E	Central Cottian Alps	I/A-04.II-B	Hautes-Alpes	FR	
914	Braunarlspitze	2649	612	47°13′46″N 10°03′52″E	Lechquellen Mts	II/B-21.II-A	Vorarlberg	AT	
915	Averau	2649	413	46°30′03″N 12°02′13″E	Dolomites - NE	II/C-31.I-D	Belluno	IT	1874
916	Jalovec	2645	511	46°25′18″N 13°40′47″E	Julian Alps	II/C-34.I-C	West Slovenia	SI	1875
917	Crête des Crousas	2645	422	44°43′23″N 06°39′38″E	Central Cottian Alps	I/A-04.II-B	Hautes-Alpes	FR	
918	Zimba	2643	578	47°05′29″N 09°47′20″E	Rätikon	II/A-15.VIII-A	Vorarlberg	AT	1848
919	Heiterwand	2639	745	47°18′52″N 10°44′04″E	Lechtal Alps	II/B-21.I-B	North Tyrol	AT	1890
920	Hocheck	2638	401	47°14′10″N 13°43′27″E	Niedere Tauern	II/A-18.II-A	Salzburg	AT	
921	Kleiner Solstein	2637	516	47°18′09″N 11°19′28″E	Karwendel	II/B-21.IV-A	North Tyrol	AT	1867
922	Birnhorn	2634	1665	47°28′29″N 12°44′02″E	Leoganger Steinberge	II/B-24.I-C	Salzburg	AT	1831
923	Crêt du Rey	2633	514	45°36′05″N 06°35′58″E	Beaufortain Massif	I/B-07.VI-A	Savoie	FR	
924	Urbeleskarspitze	2632	375	47°20′12″N 10°28′07″E	Allgäu Alps	II/B-22.II-C	North Tyrol	AT	1869
925	Großstein	2632	351	47°14′16″N 10°29′40″E	Lechtal Alps	II/B-21.I-A	North Tyrol	AT	
926	Rüfispitze	2632	342	47°11′28″N 10°10′56″E	Lechtal Alps	II/B-21.I-A	Vorarlberg	AT	
927	Monte Mongioie	2630	459	44°10′30″N 07°47′08″E	Ligurian Alps	I/A-01.II-B	Cuneo	IT	
928	Munt Buffalora	2630	351	46°37′37″N 10°15′00″E	Ortler Alps	II/A-15.V-A	Graubünden	CH	
929	Ultner Hochwart	2627	440	46°30′42″N 10°59′59″E	Ortler Alps	II/C-28.I-A	South Tyrol	IT	
930	Blutspitze / Steinkarspitze	2626	430	47°14′59″N 13°41′09″E	Niedere Tauern	II/A-18.II-A	Salzburg/Styria	AT	
931	Monte Pradella	2626	348	45°59′32″N 09°51′02″E	Bergamo Alps	II/C-29.I-A	Bergamo	IT	
932	Cima d'Auta Orientale	2624	312	46°24′02″N 11°53′10″E	Dolomites - NW	II/C-31.III-B	Belluno	IT	
933	Valschavielberge	2624	304	47°00′34″N 10°07′36″E	Verwall	II/A-15.VI-C	Vorarlberg	AT	
934	Le Rissiou	2622	522	45°11′01″N 06°04′05″E	Dauphiné Alps	I/A-05.I-B	Isère	FR	
935	Greifenberg	2618	335	47°17′21″N 13°47′23″E	Niedere Tauern	II/A-18.II-A	Salzburg/Styria	AT	
936	Monte Stelle delle Sute	2616	550	46°12′39″N 11°32′00″E	Fiemme Alps	II/C-31.V-B	Trentino	IT	
937	Grande Balmaz	2616	305	45°53′36″N 06°29′48″E	Aravis Range	I/B-08.IV-A	Savoie/Haute-Savoie	FR	
938	Piz Cavradi	2614	351	46°37′57″N 08°41′44″E	Ticino Alps	I/B-10.II-A	Graubünden	CH	
939	Pizzo dell'Alpe Gelato	2613	357	46°14′59″N 08°26′39″E	Ticino Alps	I/B-10.II-A	Ticino/V-C-O	CH/IT	
940	Le Gros Têt	2613	342	45°04′31″N 06°14′23″E	Dauphiné Alps	I/A-05.I-A	Savoie	FR	
941	Cima Bianca	2612	309	46°23′16″N 08°48′45″E	Ticino Alps	I/B-10.II-D	Ticino	CH	
942	Monte le Stelière	2612	301	44°15′57″N 07°06′26″E	Maritime Alps	I/A-02.I-C	Cuneo	IT	
943	Foostock / Ruchen	2611	388	46°57′24″N 09°14′41″E	Glarus Alps	I/B-13.II-B	Glarus/StGallen	CH	
944	Monte Legnone	2609	624	46°05′41″N 09°24′53″E	Bergamo Alps	II/C-29.I-B	Lecco/Sondrio	IT	
945	Sommet d'Assan	2609	358	44°41′08″N 06°44′10″E	Southern Cottian Alps	I/A-04.I-A	Hautes-Alpes	FR	
946	Mittlere Jägerkarspitze	2608	323	47°21′13″N 11°22′33″E	Karwendel	II/B-21.IV-A	North Tyrol	AT	1859
947	Hochkalter	2607	663	47°34′10″N 12°52′00″E	Berchtesgaden Alps	II/B-24.III-C	Bavaria	DE	1830
948	Cima del Rouss	2604	381	44°19′16″N 07°00′00″E	Maritime Alps	I/A-02.I-C	Cuneo	IT	
949	Campanile Ciastelin	2602	395	46°30′39″N 12°22′38″E	Dolomites - NE	II/C-31.I-E	Belluno	IT	1890
950	Becco di Mezzodì	2602	325	46°28′00″N 12°06′52″E	Dolomites - NE	II/C-31.I-D	Belluno	IT	1872
951	Schafseitenspitze	2602	305	47°06′10″N 11°33′16″E	Tux Alps	II/B-23.I-A	North Tyrol	AT	
952	Razor	2601	332	46°24′43″N 13°47′31″E	Julian Alps	II/C-34.I-E	West Slovenia	SI	1842
953	Monte Cabianca	2601	312	46°00′36″N 09°52′01″E	Bergamo Alps	II/C-29.I-A	Bergamo	IT	
954	Monte Mars	2600	416	45°38′00″N 07°54′55″E	Biellese Alps	I/B-09.IV-A	Aosta/Biella	IT	
955	Silberpfennig	2600	374	47°05′21″N 13°02′30″E	Goldberg Group	II/A-17.II-E	Salzburg	AT	
956	Großer Knallstein	2599	548	47°19′12″N 13°58′37″E	Niedere Tauern	II/A-18.II-A	Styria	AT	
957	Vorder Grauspitz	2599	353	47°03′10″N 09°34′52″E	Rätikon	II/A-15.VIII-A	Graub./Liecht	CH/LI	
958	Biberkopf	2599	337	47°16′14″N 10°13′58″E	Allgäu Alps	II/B-22.II-C	N-Tyrol/Bavaria	AT/DE	1853
959	Le Catogne	2598	1100	46°03′15″N 07°06′39″E	Mont Blanc massif	I/B-07.V-C	Valais	CH	
960	Zellinkopf	2597	445	46°53′39″N 12°57′05″E	Goldberg Group	II/A-17.II-E	Carinthia	AT	
961	Großer Hundstod	2594	475	47°30′45″N 12°53′12″E	Berchtesgaden Alps	II/B-24.III-A	Salzburg/Bavaria	AT/DE	1825
962	Roc du Bécoin	2594	328	45°29′34″N 06°39′50″E	Vanoise Massif	I/B-07.II-B	Savoie	FR	
963	Gametzalpenkopf	2594	306	46°41′21″N 12°06′32″E	Dolomites - NE	II/C-31.I-B	South Tyrol	IT	
964	Pizzo Paglia	2593	498	46°13′54″N 09°13′09″E	Adula Alps	I/B-10.III-D	Graubünden	CH	
965	Monte Forno / Monte Gorio	2593	339	46°17′43″N 08°19′25″E	Leone-Gotthard Alps	I/B-10.I-A	V-C-O	IT	
966	Hochvogel	2592	572	47°22′47″N 10°26′13″E	Allgäu Alps	II/B-22.II-C	N-Tyrol/Bavaria	AT/DE	1832
967	Zwölferspitz	2592	360	46°39′42″N 12°43′42″E	Carnic Alps	II/C-33.I-A	Carinthia	AT	1896
968	Eggenkofel	2591	714	46°44′19″N 12°40′41″E	Gailtal Alps	II/C-33.II-A	East Tyrol	AT	
969	Rupprechtseck	2591	417	47°14′22″N 14°00′05″E	Niedere Tauern	II/A-18.II-A	Salzburg/Styria	AT	
970	Kanin	2587	1397	46°21′36″N 13°26′18″E	Julian Alps	II/C-34.I-B	Udine/Slovenia	IT/SI	
971	Monte Terza Grande	2586	1277	46°31′37″N 12°37′17″E	Carnic Alps	II/C-33.I-C	Belluno	IT	
972	Monte Cridola	2581	538	46°25′35″N 12°29′12″E	Carnic Prealps	II/C-33.III-A	Belluno	IT	1884
973	Hochspitz /M. Vancomun	2581	303	46°39′26″N 12°40′07″E	Carnic Alps	II/C-33.I-A	E-Tyrol/Belluno	AT/IT	
974	Ruitelspitze	2580	322	47°15′20″N 10°26′46″E	Lechtal Alps	II/B-21.I-A	North Tyrol	AT	
975	Mont Triboulet	2578	336	44°12′22″N 06°51′57″E	Maritime Alps	I/A-02.I-D	Alpes Maritimes	FR	
976	Türchlwand	2577	475	47°09′03″N 13°01′57″E	Goldberg Group	II/A-17.II-E	Salzburg	AT	
977	Plose (Große Gabler)	2576	713	46°41′23″N 11°45′47″E	Dolomites - NW	II/C-31.III-A	South Tyrol	IT	
978	Stätzerhorn	2575	1028	46°45′21″N 09°30′44″E	Plessur Alps	II/A-15.VII-C	Graubünden	CH	
979	Cima delle Buse	2574	318	46°11′10″N 11°29′53″E	Fiemme Alps	II/C-31.V-B	Trentino	IT	
980	Pfannenstock	2573	373	46°57′42″N 08°54′41″E	Schwyz Alps	I/B-13.I-B	Schwyz	CH	
981	Westlicher Johanneskopf	2573	328	47°12′37″N 10°01′21″E	Lechquellen Mts	II/B-21.II-A	Vorarlberg	AT	
982	Torrione dei Longerin	2571	536	46°37′45″N 12°33′41″E	Carnic Alps	II/C-33.I-A	Belluno	IT	
983	Setsas	2571	403	46°31′10″N 11°57′27″E	Dolomites - NE	II/C-31.I-C	Belluno	IT	
984	Kanjavec	2569	405	46°21′37″N 13°48′35″E	Julian Alps	II/C-34.I-E	West Slovenia	SI	1877
985	Tête du Collier	2567	903	44°43′02″N 05°57′51″E	Dauphiné Prealps	I/A-06.I-A	Hautes-Alpes	FR	
986	Maurerkopf	2567	352	46°42′46″N 12°02′02″E	Dolomites - NE	II/C-31.I-B	South Tyrol	IT	
987	Schiara	2565	964	46°13′48″N 12°10′56″E	Dolomites - SE	II/C-31.II-B	Belluno	IT	
988	Hinter Planitzer	2562	317	47°13′04″N 12°38′13″E	Glockner Group	II/A-17.II-C	Salzburg	AT	
989	Grand Galbert	2561	487	45°05′26″N 05°57′35″E	Taillefer Massif	I/A-05.IV-A	Isère	FR	
990	Grintovec	2558	1706	46°21′25″N 14°32′10″E	Kamnik Alps	II/C-35.II-B	East Slovenia	SI	1759
991	Kreuzjoch	2558	1051	47°15′05″N 11°58′58″E	Kitzbühel Alps	II/B-23.II-A	North Tyrol	AT	
992	Monte Bo	2556	616	45°42′51″N 07°59′56″E	Biellese Alps	I/B-09.IV-A	Biella	IT	
993	Wolayer Seekopf / Monte Capolago	2554	585	46°36′22″N 12°51′39″E	Carnic Alps	II/C-33.I-A	Carinthia/Udine	AT/IT	
994	Pizzo Tre Signori	2554	462	46°00′43″N 09°31′42″E	Bergamo Alps	II/C-29.I-B	Berg/Lecc/Sond	IT	
995	Modeon del Buinz	2554	313	46°25′00″N 13°28′16″E	Julian Alps	II/C-34.I-A	Udine	IT	
996	Namloser Wetterspitze	2553	722	47°19′23″N 10°38′30″E	Lechtal Alps	II/B-21.I-B	North Tyrol	AT	1876
997	Kirchlispitzen	2552	313	47°02′20″N 09°46′10″E	Rätikon	II/A-15.VIII-A	Vorarlb/Graub.	AT/CH	1891
998	Tàmer Piccolo	2550	846	46°18′38″N 12°07′19″E	Dolomites - SE	II/C-31.II-B	Belluno	IT	1892
999	Concarena (Cima della Bacchetta)	2549	721	46°00′39″N 10°16′48″E	Bergamasque Prealps	II/C-29.II-C	Bergamo	IT	
1000	Monte Brentoni	2548	1017	46°30′46″N 12°33′57″E	Carnic Alps	II/C-33.I-C	Belluno	IT	
1001	Le Tarent	2548	1002	46°22′56″N 07°08′51″E	Vaud Alps	I/B-14.I-A	Vaud	CH	
1002	Monfalcon di Montanaia	2548	499	46°24′16″N 12°29′10″E	Carnic Prealps	II/C-33.III-A	Bell./Pordenone	IT	
1003	Sass de Mura	2547	1178	46°09′49″N 11°55′31″E	Dolomites - S	II/C-31.IV-B	Belluno/Trentino	IT	1881
1004	Rosso di Ribia	2547	569	46°15′40″N 08°31′47″E	Ticino Alps	I/B-10.II-A	Ticino	CH	
1005	Prisojnik	2547	551	46°25′31″N 13°46′12″E	Julian Alps	II/C-34.I-E	West Slovenia	SI	
1006	Hochnissl	2547	360	47°22′02″N 11°37′05″E	Karwendel	II/B-21.IV-A	North Tyrol	AT	
1007	Les Aiguillettes	2547	313	45°11′02″N 06°07′30″E	Dauphiné Alps	I/A-05.I-B	Isère	FR	
1008	Crest / Monte Cresto	2546	344	45°40′51″N 07°54′36″E	Biellese Alps	I/B-09.IV-A	Aosta/Biella	IT	
1009	L'Aiguille Rouge/Guglia Rossa	2545	351	45°02′46″N 06°38′40″E	Massif des Cerces	I/A-04.III-A	Hautes-Alpes	FR	
1010	Predigstuhl	2543	385	47°15′43″N 13°54′41″E	Niedere Tauern	II/A-18.II-A	Styria	AT	
1011	Monte Talvena	2542	602	46°15′58″N 12°09′21″E	Dolomites - SE	II/C-31.II-B	Belluno	IT	
1012	Giferspitz	2542	556	46°27′04″N 07°21′12″E	Bernese Prealps	I/B-14.II-A	Bern	CH	
1013	Mohnenfluh	2542	387	47°13′56″N 10°06′08″E	Lechquellen Mts	II/B-21.II-A	Vorarlberg	AT	
1014	Pöngertlekopf & Pfaffeneck (Note: Equally high twin peaks separated by 500 m and a 170 m deep pass.)	2539	632	47°10′27″N 10°02′04″E	Lechquellen Mts	II/B-21.II-A	Vorarlberg	AT	
1015	Östliche Karwendelspitze	2537	734	47°26′42″N 11°25′19″E	Karwendel	II/B-21.IV-A	N-Tyrol/Bavaria	AT/DE	1870
1016	Pizzo Cavregasco	2535	334	46°14′22″N 09°16′35″E	Adula Alps	I/B-10.III-D	Como/Sondrio	IT	
1017	Glogghüs	2534	554	46°45′38″N 08°15′45″E	Urner Alps	I/B-14.III-B	Bern/Obwalden	CH	
1018	Hochwang	2534	417	46°52′27″N 09°37′59″E	Plessur Alps	II/A-15.VII-A	Graubünden	CH	
1019	Pointe de Comborsier	2534	403	45°36′37″N 06°30′56″E	Beaufortain Massif	I/B-07.VI-A	Savoie	FR	
1020	Großer Widderstein	2533	845	47°17′05″N 10°07′45″E	Allgäu Alps	II/B-22.II-C	Vorarlberg	AT	1669
1021	Cima Quarazza	2530	413	46°07′47″N 11°34′12″E	Fiemme Alps	II/C-31.V-B	Trentino	IT	
1022	Cima Coltorondo	2530	350	46°15′21″N 11°38′17″E	Fiemme Alps	II/C-31.V-B	Trentino	IT	
1023	Gurpitscheck	2526	660	47°12′39″N 13°36′53″E	Niedere Tauern	II/A-18.II-A	Salzburg	AT	
1024	Gamskofel	2526	467	46°37′51″N 12°54′03″E	Carnic Alps	II/C-33.I-A	Carinthia	AT	
1025	Mont Joly	2525	536	45°49′34″N 06°41′35″E	Beaufortain Massif	I/B-07.VI-B	Haute-Savoie	FR	
1026	Magerrain	2524	357	47°01′59″N 09°13′12″E	Glarus Alps	I/B-13.II-A	Glarus/StGallen	CH	
1027	Hocheisspitze	2523	410	47°32′49″N 12°50′36″E	Berchtesgaden Alps	II/B-24.III-C	Salzburg/Bavaria	AT/DE	1868
1028	Hoher Göll	2522	789	47°35′39″N 13°04′04″E	Berchtesgaden Alps	II/B-24.III-B	Salzburg/Bavaria	AT/DE	1800
1029	Presolana	2521	725	45°57′24″N 10°03′19″E	Bergamasque Prealps	II/C-29.II-C	Bergamo	IT	1870
1030	Monte delle Scale	2521	580	46°30′09″N 10°19′36″E	Livigno Alps	II/A-15.IV-A	Sondrio	IT	
1031	Tschuggen	2521	460	46°36′01″N 07°56′59″E	Bernese Prealps	I/B-14.II-B	Bern	CH	
1032	Hochjoch	2520	547	47°03′58″N 09°59′17″E	Verwall	II/A-15.VI-C	Vorarlberg	AT	
1033	Dreispitz	2520	523	46°35′34″N 07°45′35″E	Bernese Prealps	I/B-14.II-B	Bern	CH	
1034	Steinwand / Creta Verde	2520	509	46°38′34″N 12°47′32″E	Carnic Alps	II/C-33.I-A	Carinthia/Udine	AT/IT	
1035	Cima di Bri	2520	313	46°18′19″N 08°53′03″E	Ticino Alps	I/B-10.II-D	Ticino	CH	
1036	Monte Seleron	2519	458	46°06′00″N 09°43′44″E	Bergamo Alps	II/C-29.I-A	Sondrio	IT	
1037	Großer Priel	2515	1710	47°43′01″N 14°03′48″E	Totes Gebirge	II/B-25.III-A	Upper Austria	AT	1817
1038	Chaiserstock	2515	470	46°55′42″N 08°43′43″E	Schwyz Alps	I/B-14.IV-A	Schwyz/Uri	CH	
1039	Cima Busa Alta	2513	331	46°14′59″N 11°36′34″E	Fiemme Alps	II/C-31.V-B	Trentino	IT	
1040	Glanderspitze	2512	971	47°08′54″N 10°39′42″E	Ötztal Alps	II/A-16.I-C	North Tyrol	AT	
1041	Pizzo Arera	2512	691	45°56′05″N 09°48′57″E	Bergamasque Prealps	II/C-29.II-B	Bergamo	IT	
1042	Pizzo Alto	2512	320	46°04′39″N 09°27′24″E	Bergamo Alps	II/C-29.I-B	Lecco/Sondrio	IT	
1043	Großes Ochsenhorn	2511	1309	47°32′18″N 12°39′39″E	Loferer Steinberge	II/B-24.I-A	Salzburg	AT	
1044	Villanderer Berg	2509	426	46°39′31″N 11°25′08″E	Sarntal Alps	II/A-16.III-A	South Tyrol	IT	
1045	Mitterhorn	2506	335	47°32′58″N 12°37′43″E	Loferer Steinberge	II/B-24.I-A	Salzburg	AT	
1046	Dormillouse	2505	392	44°24′35″N 06°23′13″E	Provence Alps	I/A-03.1-A	A-d-H-Provence	FR	
1047	Breithorn	2504	327	47°27′25″N 12°54′10″E	Berchtesgaden Alps	II/B-24.III-A	Salzburg	AT	
1048	Cima di Pape / Cima di Sanson	2503	696	46°20′04″N 11°55′41″E	Dolomites - S	II/C-31.IV-A	Belluno	IT	
1049	Piz Ledu	2503	375	46°13′57″N 09°19′18″E	Adula Alps	I/B-10.III-D	Como/Sondrio	IT	
1050	Säntis	2502	2015	47°14′58″N 09°20′36″E	Appenzell Alps	I/B-14.V-B	App/StG (Note: Säntis is on the border of Appenzell Ausserrhoden, Appenzell Innerrhoden, and St. Gallen.)	CH	1680
1051	Großer Pleißlingkeil	2501	410	47°13′38″N 13°29′29″E	Niedere Tauern	II/A-18.I-A	Salzburg	AT	

The table is continued here.

== See also ==
- List of mountains of the Alps above 3000 m
- List of Alpine peaks by prominence
- List of Alpine four-thousanders
- List of the highest mountains in Austria
- List of the highest mountains in Germany
- List of mountains in Slovenia
- List of mountains of Switzerland

== Sources ==
- Jonathan de Ferranti & Eberhard Jurgalski's map-checked ALPS TO R589m and rough, computer-generated EUROPE TO R150m lists
- Christian Thöni's list of 8875 summits in Switzerland
- Clem Clements' Austria above 2500 m lists
- Mark Trengrove and Clem Clements' list of German alps above 2000 m
- Mark Trengrove's lists of several regions of the French Alps, and of the Grand paradiso and Rutor ranges of the Italian Alps
