= Rote Säule =

Rote Säule (German for "red column"), also Rote Saile, is the name of the following:

Austrian mountains

- Rote Säule (Tauern) (2,993 m), in the Venediger Group
- Rote Säule (Wallhorn) (2,820 m), in the Venediger Group

Monument

- Rote Säule (Kobernaußerwald), monument in Eberschwang
