= Tauernkogel =

Tauernkogel is the name of the following mountains in Austria:

- (Felber) Tauernkogel (Venediger Group) (2,988 m), near the Felber Tauern pass in the Venediger Group, Salzburg–Tyrolean border
- (Krimmler) Tauernkogel (Zillertal Alps) (2,872 m), near the Krimmler Tauern pass in the eastern Zillertal Alps, Salzburg–South Tyrolean border
- (Kalser) Tauernkogel (Granatspitze Group) (2,683 m), near the Kalser Tauern pass in the Granatspitze Group, Salzburg–Tyrolean border
- Tauernkogel (Tennen Mountains) (2,247 m), in the Tennen Mountains in the state of Salzburg
