= Dürrenstein =

Dürrenstein may refer to:

- Dürrenstein (Austria)
- Dürrenstein (South Tyrol), Italy
- Dursztyn, a village in Poland
