= Schenadüi =

Mountain in Switzerland

- Location within Switzerland

Highest point
- Elevation: 2,747 m (9,012 ft)
- Prominence: 379 m (1,243 ft)
- Parent peak: Piz Ravetsch
- Listing: Alpine mountains 2500-2999 m
- Coordinates: 46°33′09″N 8°44′55.6″E

Geography
- Location: Ticino, Switzerland
- Parent range: Lepontine Alps

The Schenadüi is a mountain of the Lepontine Alps, located in the Swiss canton of Ticino. It lies between the valleys of Piora and Cadlimo and on the main Alpine watershed between the basin of the Rhine and that of the Ticino.
