= Colac (mountain) =

Mountain in Italy

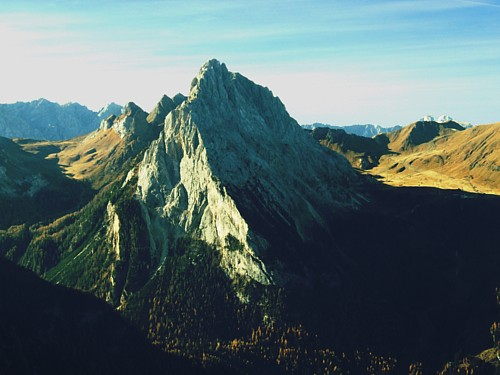
- Colac from the mountain Fredarola

Highest point
- Elevation: 2,715 m (8,907 ft)
- Prominence: 377 m (1,237 ft)
- Listing: Alpine mountains 2500-2999 m
- Coordinates: 46°26′29″N 11°46′58″E

Geography
- Location within Alps
- Location: Trentino, Italy
- Parent range: Dolomites

Colac (Il Collaccio) is a mountain in the Dolomites of Italy. The mountain is located in the north of the province of Trentino near the ski resort of Canazei. At 2,715 metres (8,907 ft) it is the highest summit of the Colac-Buffaure subgroup that forms part of the Marmolada group.

The mountain saw few visitors until the Via Ferrata dei Finanzieri was established. A cable car runs from Penia to the Ciampac meadows directly at the base of the mountain.
