= Schwarzberg (Lepontine Alps) =

Mountain in Switzerland

- Piz Nair
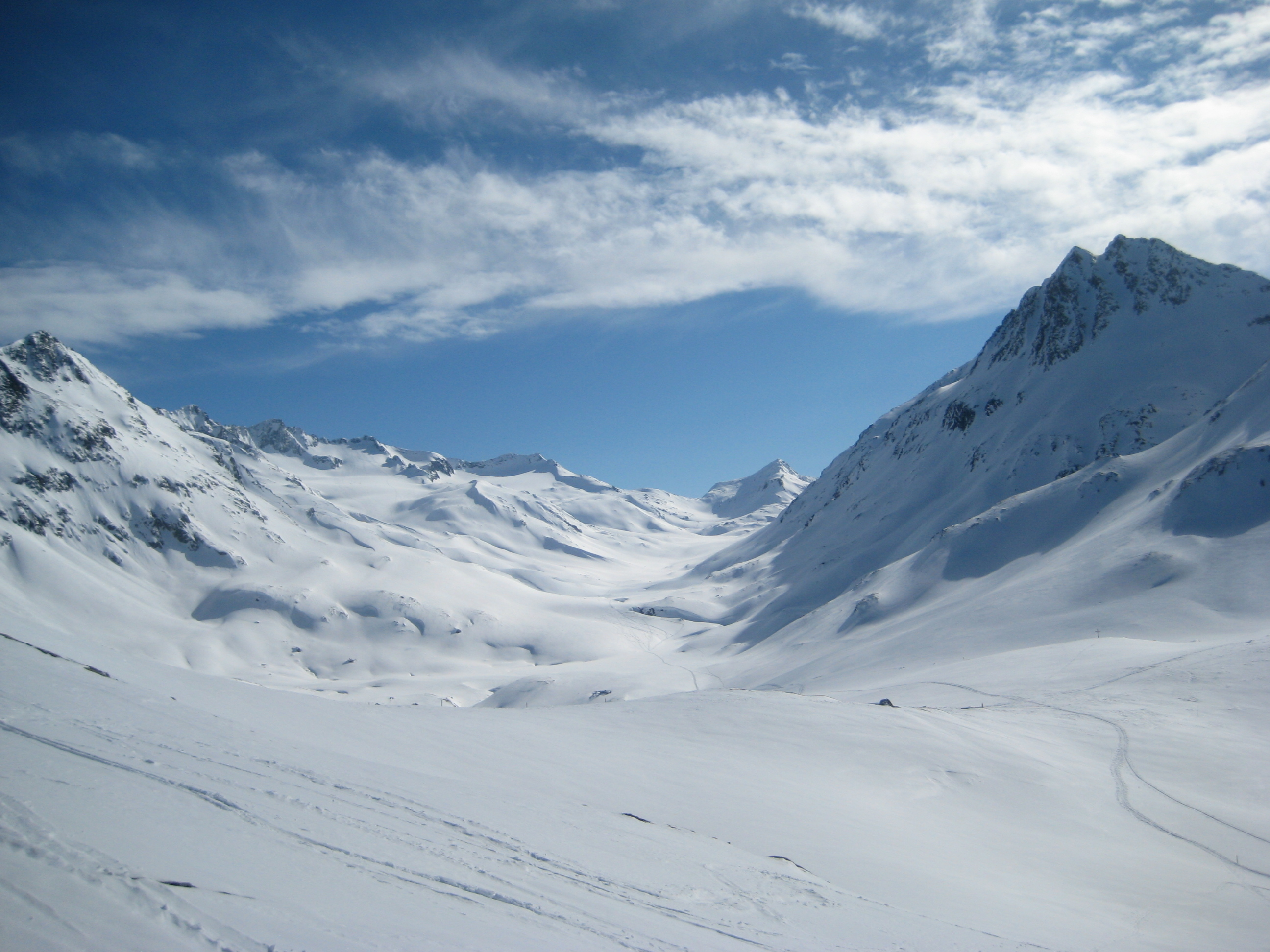
- The Schwarzberg (right) overlookng the Val Maighels

Highest point
- Elevation: 2,764 m (9,068 ft)
- Prominence: 343 m (1,125 ft)
- Parent peak: Piz Gannaretsch
- Listing: Alpine mountains 2500-2999 m
- Coordinates: 46°36′34″N 8°40′40″E

Geography
- Location within Switzerland
- Location: Uri/Graubünden, Switzerland
- Parent range: Lepontine Alps

The Schwarzberg (also known as Piz Nair) (2,764 m) is a mountain of the Lepontine Alps, located on the border between the Swiss cantons of Uri and Graubünden. It lies between the valleys of Unteralp (west) and Maighels (east).
