= Monte Talvena =

Mountain in Italy

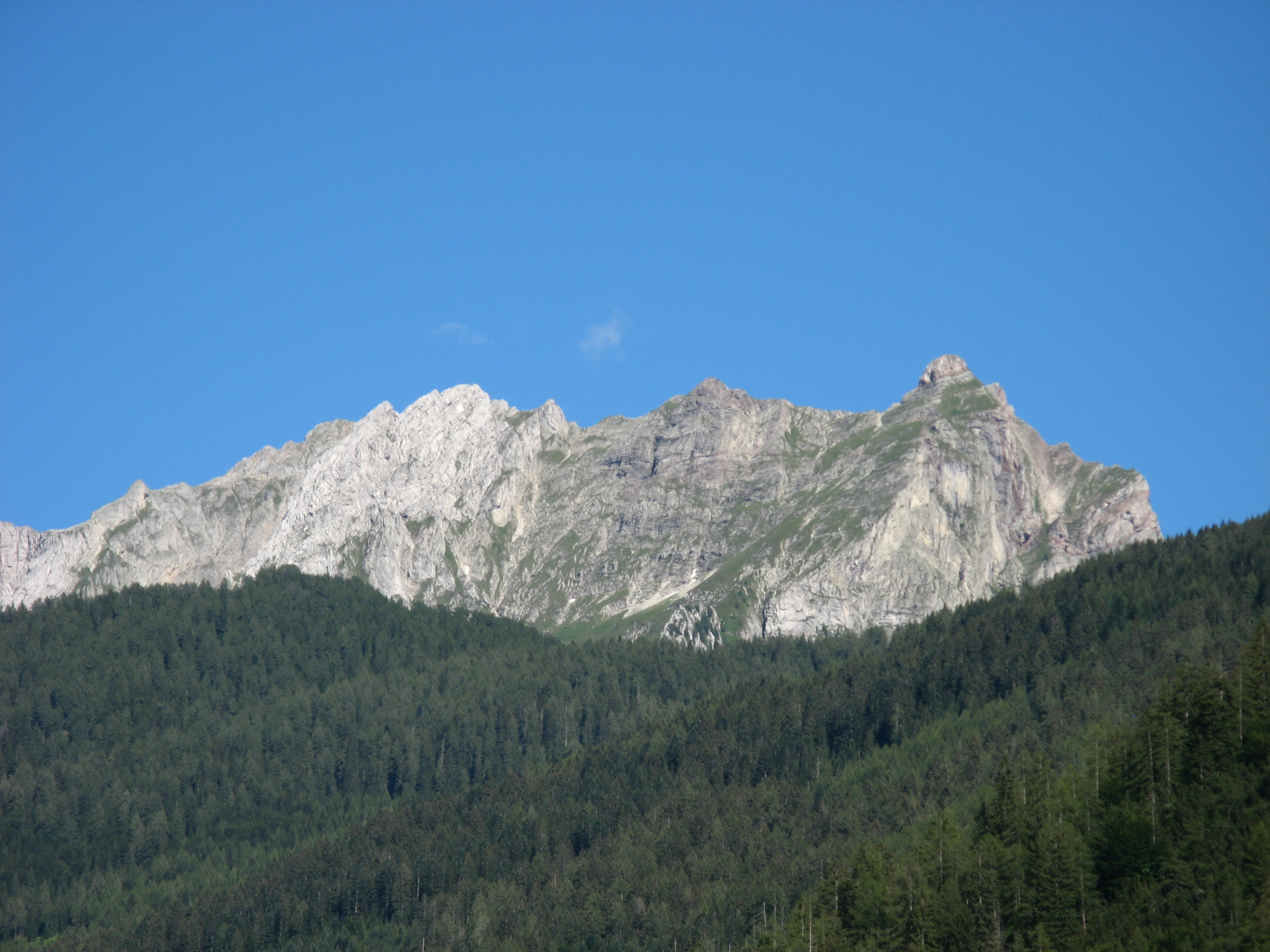
- Monte Talvena

Highest point
- Elevation: 2,542 m (8,340 ft)
- Prominence: 602 m (1,975 ft)
- Listing: Alpine mountains 2500-2999 m
- Coordinates: 46°15′57″N 12°09′21″E

Geography
- Location within Alps
- Location: Veneto, Italy
- Parent range: Dolomites

Monte Talvena is a mountain of the Dolomites in Veneto, Italy. It has an elevation of 2,542 metres.
