= Peitlerkofel =

Mountain in Italy

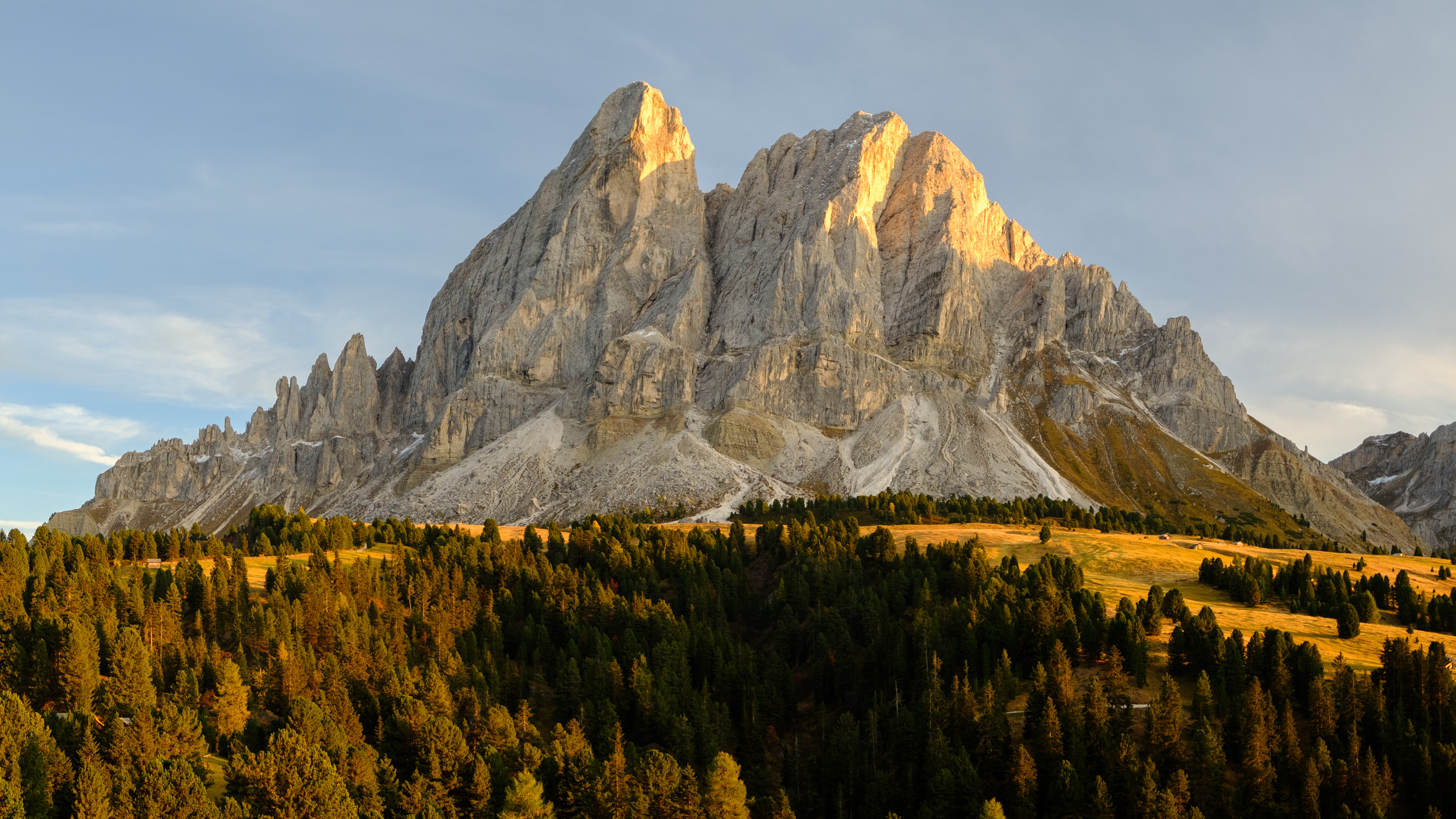
- Peitlerkofel in Autumn 2019

Highest point
- Elevation: 2,875 m (9,432 ft)
- Prominence: 638
- Listing: Alpine mountains 2500-2999 m
- Coordinates: 46°39′32″N 11°49′11″E

Geography
- Location within Alps
- Location: South Tyrol, Italy
- Parent range: Dolomites

Climbing
- First ascent: 25 June 1885 by Anton Posselt-Csorich and others

The Peitlerkofel (Ladin: Sas de Pütia, Italian: Sass de Putia) is a mountain of the Dolomites in South Tyrol, Italy. A solitary mountain, it stands between Val Badia to the east and the Villnöß valley to the west, in the very north of the Dolomites. It boasts two distinct summits, the Grosser Peitler (2875m) and the Kleiner Peitler (2813m), which are divided by a deep ridge.

It is a fairly popular mountain to climb, with the normal and easiest route being from the south. On a fine day it is common to have hundreds of people on the mountain at once. The first documented ascent occurred on June 25, 1885, although it is expected that local hunters probably reached the summit long before then.
