= Tiejer Flue =

Mountain in Switzerland

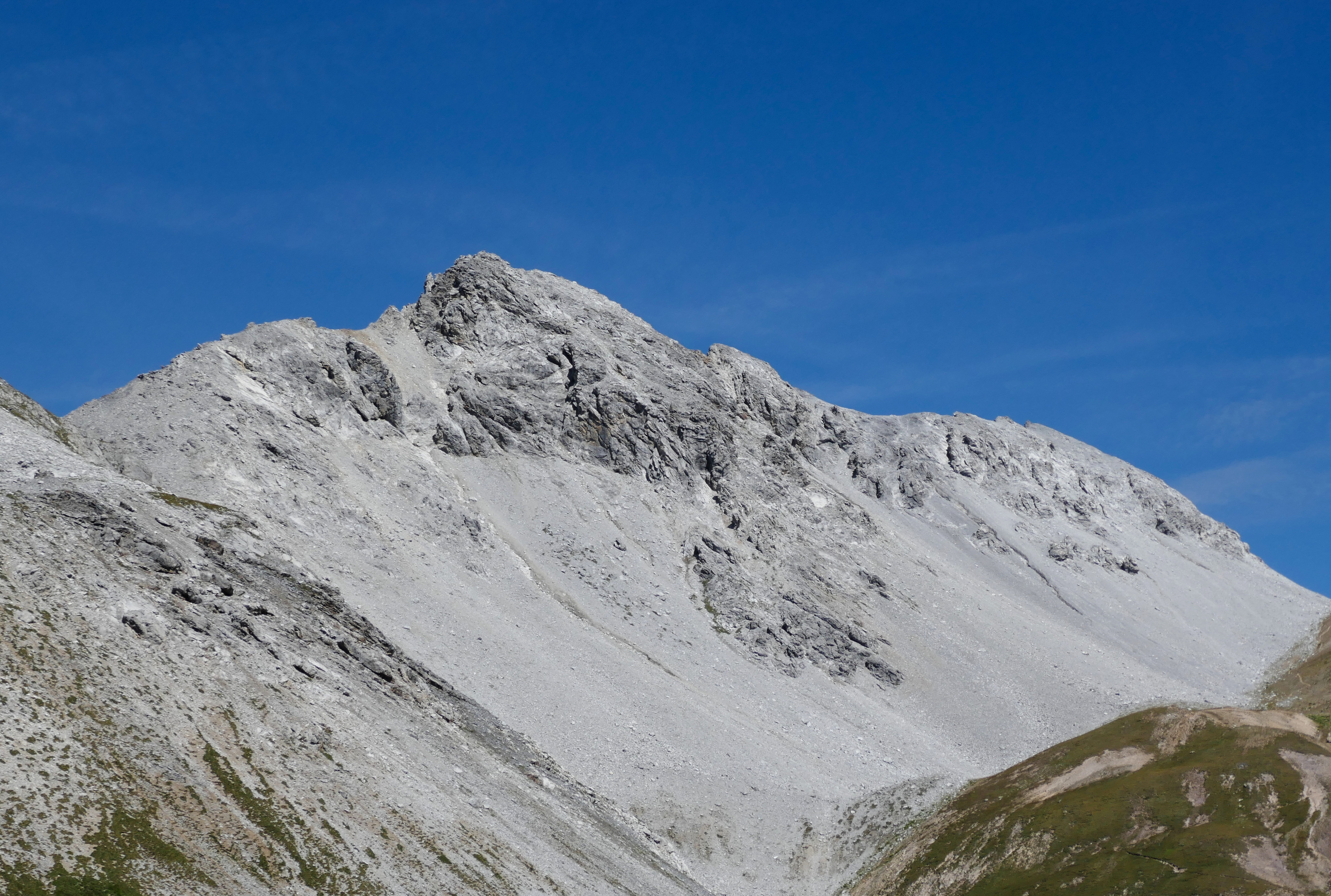
- Southern face of the Tiejer Flue

Highest point
- Elevation: 2,781 m (9,124 ft)
- Prominence: 345 m (1,132 ft)
- Parent peak: Aroser Rothorn
- Listing: Alpine mountains 2500-2999 m
- Coordinates: 46°46′51.7″N 9°44′05.7″E

Geography
- Location within Switzerland
- Location: Graubünden, Switzerland
- Parent range: Plessur Alps

The Tiejer Flue is a mountain of the Plessur Alps, located between Arosa and Davos in the canton of Graubünden. It is the main summit between the Maienfelder Furgga and the Strelapass.
