= Pflunspitzen =

Mountain range in Austrian Alps

Pflunspitze
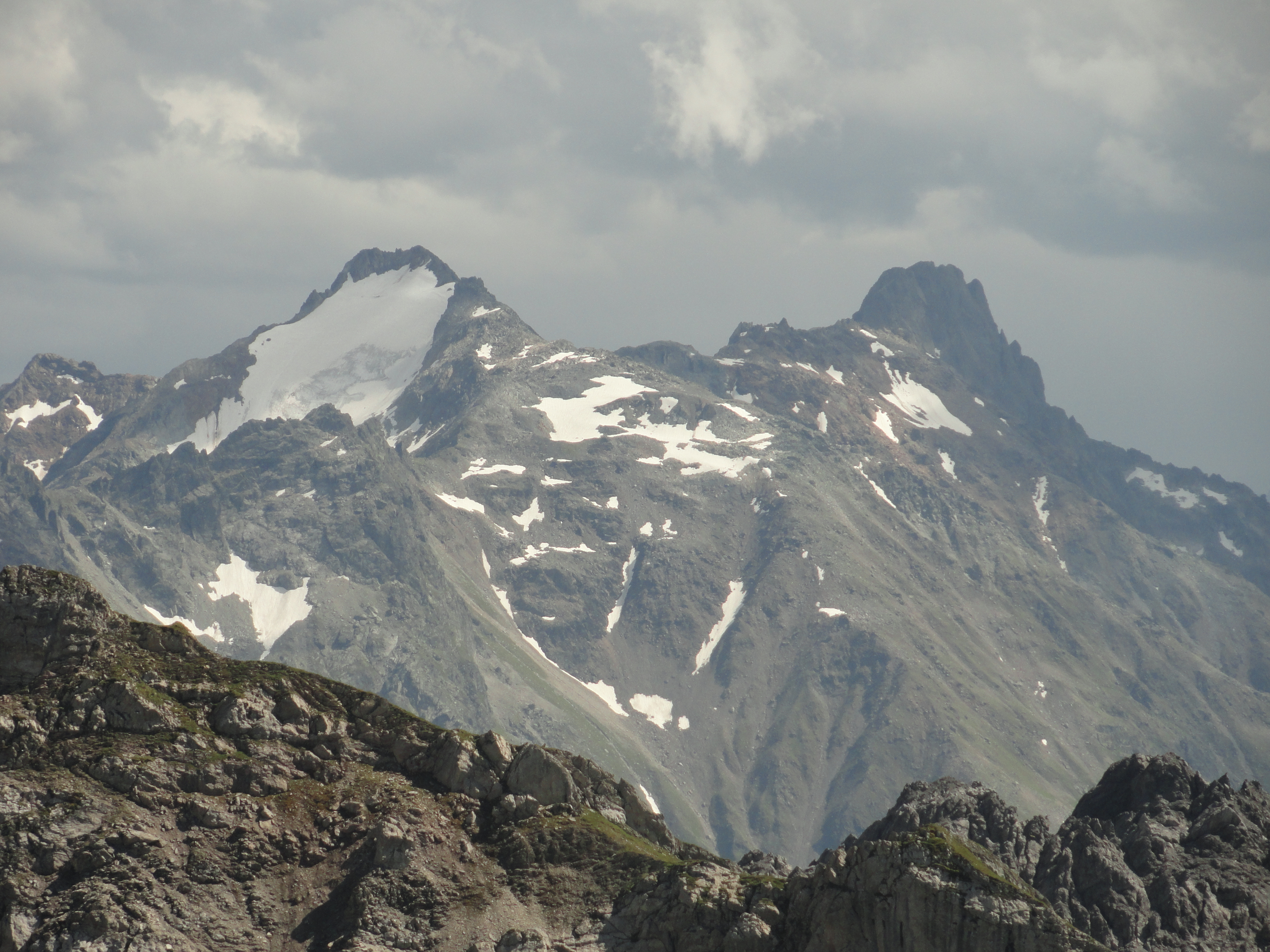
- The Kaltenberg (l) and Pflunspitze (r) from the Roggalspitze to the north

Highest point
- Elevation: 2,912 m (AA) (9,554 ft)
- Prominence: 975 m ↓ Silbertaler Winterjöchle
- Isolation: 5.6 km → Patteriol to Patteriol
- Coordinates: 47°04′46″N 10°07′58″E

Geography
- Location within Austria
- Location: Tyrol and Vorarlberg, Austria
- Parent range: Verwall Group

The Pflunspitzen are the highest points in the western Verwall Group in the Austrian Alps, reaching a maximum height of 2,912 m (AA). They lie west of the neighbouring Kaltenberg; the nearest village is Klösterle by Arlberg north of the peaks.

The summit block is divided into the south top (2,869 m above sea level (AA)), the fore top (Vorgipfel), the main summit (Hauptgipfel, 2,912 m above sea level (AA)) and the north top. Several routes run from the Reutlinger Hut and the Konstanzer Hut to the summit. The easiest route – climbing grade I – runs from the Reutlinger Hut via the south cold to the south top. Other routes vary in difficulty between grades III and V and are usually described as scenic rock climbing routes, as is the crossing from the north top to the Kaltenberg (III). The Via Katrin (III to VI) runs up the west face to the main summit.

== Literature ==
- Peter Pindur, Roland Luzian, Andreas Weiskopf: Alpine Club Guide Verwallgruppe. Bergverlag Rother, 10th edn., Munich, 2005, ISBN 3-7633-1251-X
