= Rote Säule (Wallhorn) =

Rote Säule (Rote Saile)
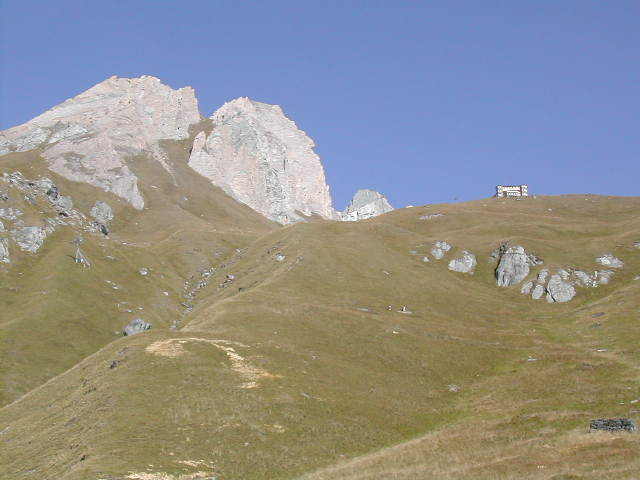
- The Rote Säule and the Sajat Hut

Highest point
- Elevation: 2,820 m (AA) (9,250 ft)
- Prominence: 70 m ↓ Sajatscharte
- Isolation: 0.41 km → Knappenspitze
- Coordinates: 47°02′22″N 12°20′59″E

Geography
- Location within Austria
- Location: East Tyrol, Austria
- Parent range: Venediger Group

The Rote Säule or Rote Saile is a mountain, 2,820 metres (according to other sources 2,879 metres) high on the Wallhornkamm in the Venediger Group. Its summit is accessible from Prägraten via the Sajat Hut and from there via an only slightly exposed normal route via the Saukopf or up a klettersteig with two climbing options. In the other direction the Rote Säule may be gained via the Kreuzspitze and the Schernerskopf from the Eissee Hut in the Timmel valley (Timmeltal) via the col of Zopetscharte and the Tulpspitze. To the south is the Obere Saukopf.
