= Patteriol =

Mountain of the Verwall Alps in Tyrol, Austria

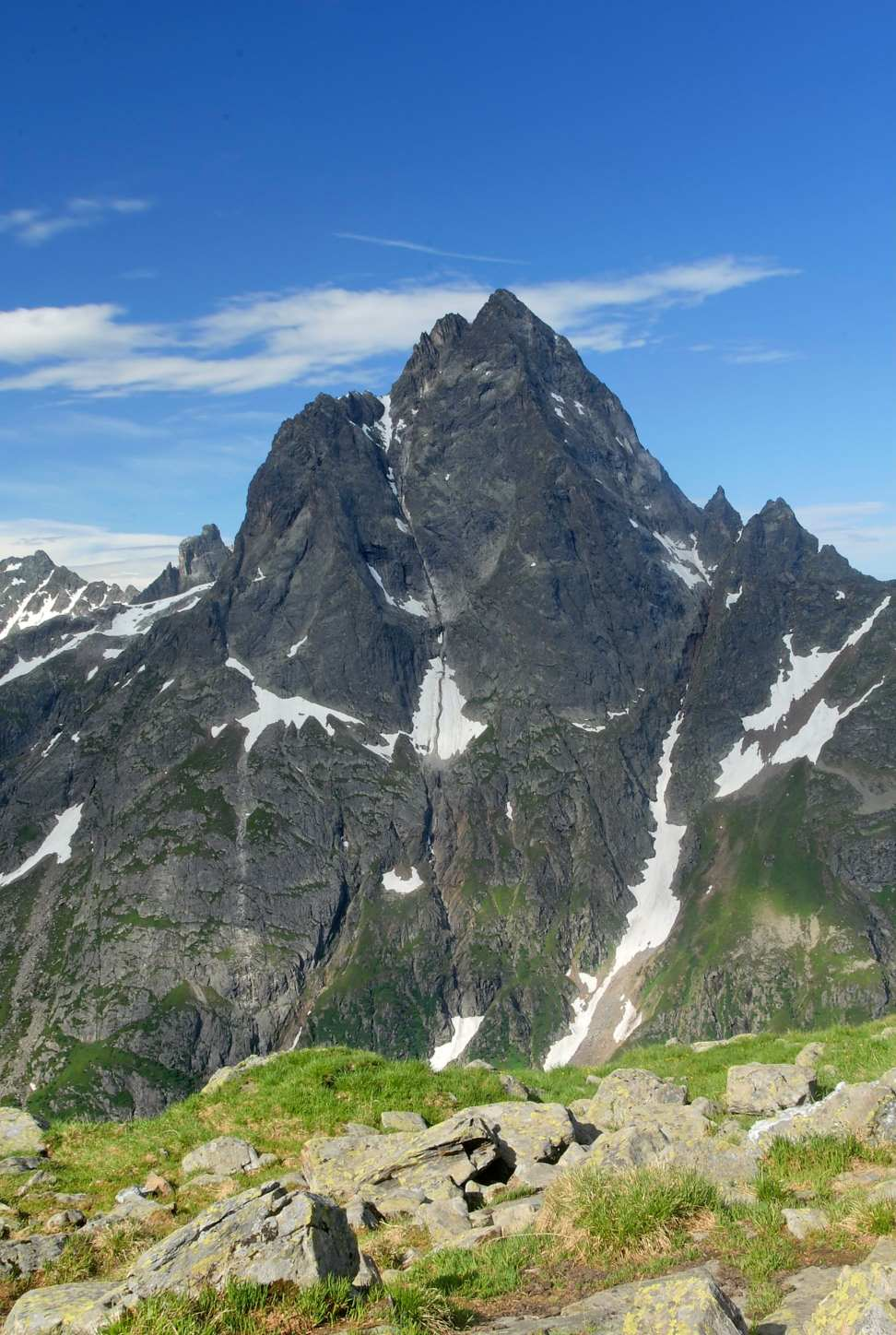

Highest point
- Elevation: 3,056 m (10,026 ft)
- Prominence: 463 m (1,519 ft)
- Listing: Alpine mountains above 3000 m
- Coordinates: 47°2′39″N 10°11′14″E

Geography
- Location within Alps
- Location: Tyrol, Austria
- Parent range: Verwall Alps

Climbing
- First ascent: ca. 1860
- Normal route: UIAA grade II

The Patteriol is a mountain in the Verwall Alps in the Austrian state of Tyrol. It has an elevation of 3,056 m (AA). (In old literature the elevation is stated higher: 3,059 m or 10,037 ft. Patteriol is sometimes called "Matterhorn of Verwall" because of its shape.

Aside from the main summit, the Patteriol has some more summits:

- South summit (also called Pfeilerkopf, 2,884 m)
- Horn (3,003 m)
- Kleiner Patteriol (2,590 m)
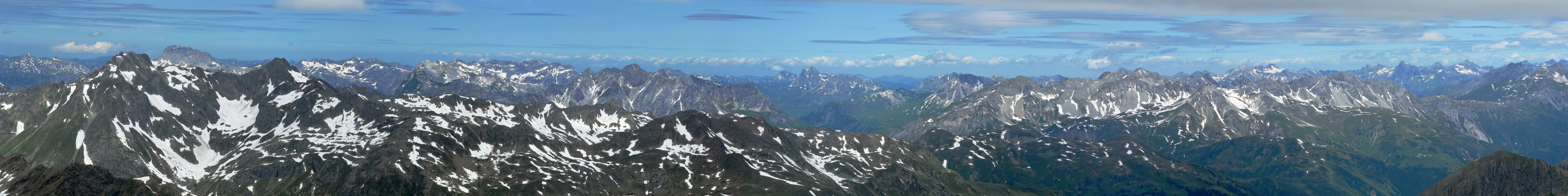
View from top of the Patteriol in north direction

== Ascents ==
The ascent on normal route from the alpine club hut Konstanzer Hütte at 1688 m to the summit takes approximately 4½ to 5 hours and difficulty grade is II on UIAA climbing scale. The first ascensionists of the summit were around the year 1860 two geodesists, three hunters and a soldier (a "Kaiserjäger").

Additionally there are rock climbing routes. Some of them are:

- North-east ridge, UIAA grade mostly III, two spots IV− and V
- East pillar, grade IV+
- South pillar, grade IV+
