= Dristner =

Mountain in Tyrol, Austria

- Location within Austria

Highest point
- Elevation: 2,767 m (9,078 ft)
- Listing: List of mountains in Austria
- Coordinates: 47°06′45″N 11°50′22″E

Geography
- Country: Austria
- State: Tyrol
- Parent range: Zillertal Alps

Dristner is a mountain in the Zillertal valley of Austria. The summit can be reached by starting in the village of Ginzling.
