= Dremelspitze =

Mountain in the Austrian Alps

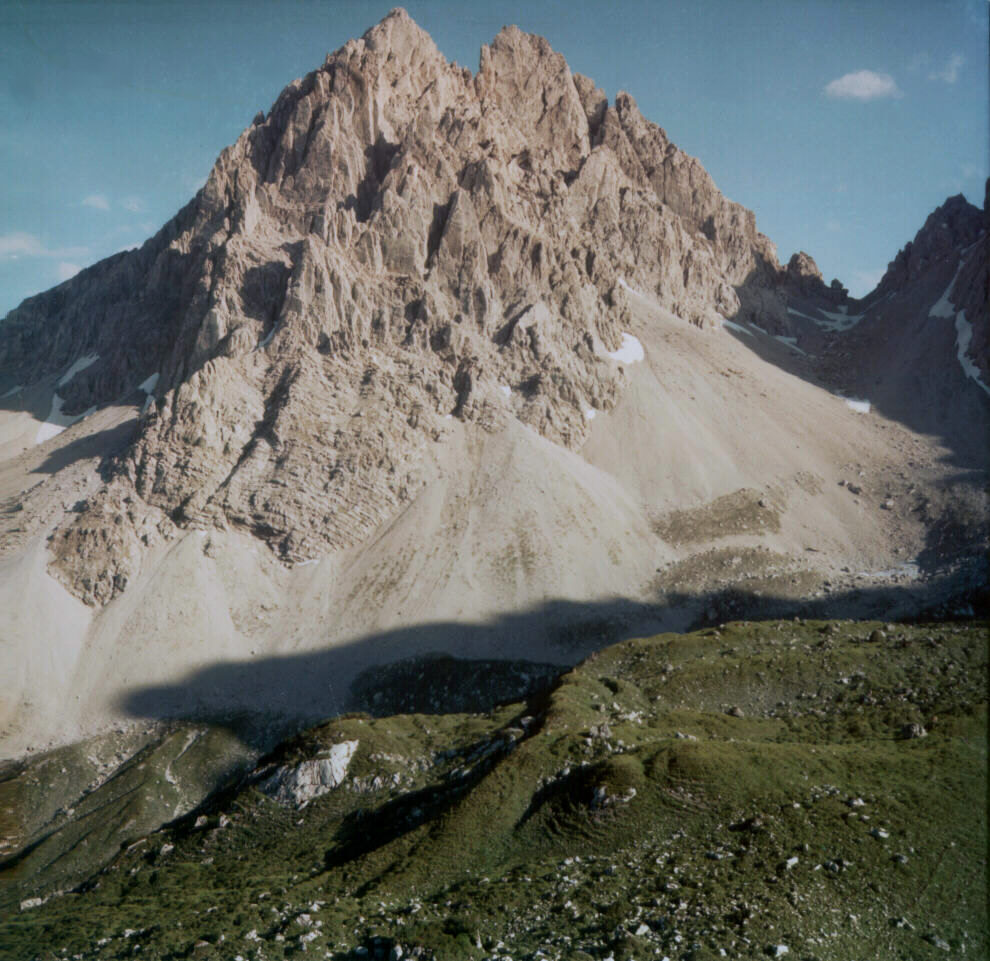
- Dremelspitze from the north side

Highest point
- Elevation: 2,733 m (8,967 ft)
- Coordinates: 47°14′0″N 10°36′0″E

Geography
- Location within Austria
- Location: Tyrol, Austria
- Parent range: Lechtal Alps

Dremelspitze is a mountain in the Lechtal Alps of Tyrol, Austria. The elevation at its peak is 2,733 metres (8,967 ft).
