= Grande Autane =

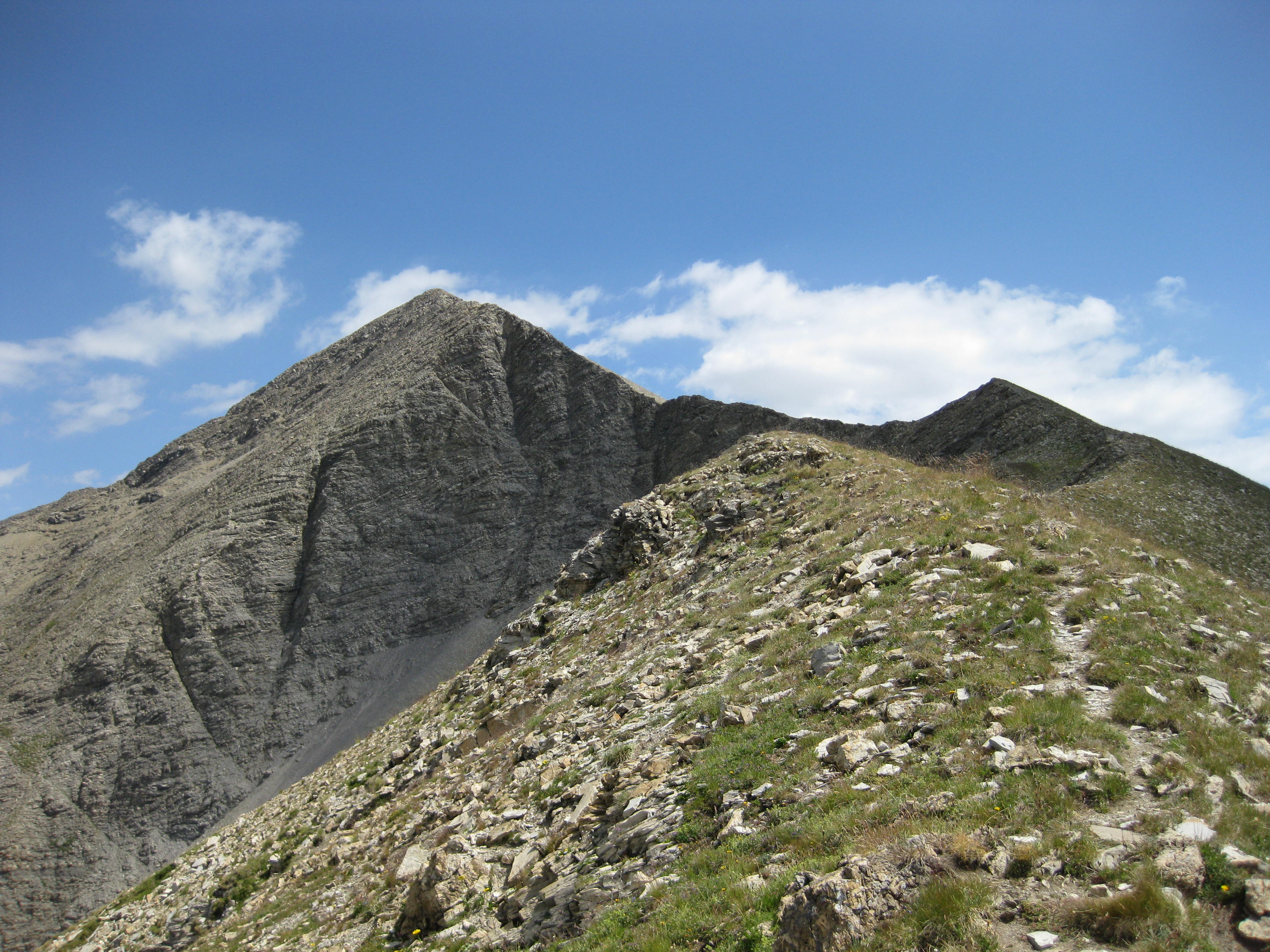
- Grande Autane, east view from the ridge after passing Col de Combeau.

Highest point
- Elevation: 2,782 m (9,127 ft)
- Coordinates: 44°38′45″N 6°17′7″E

Geography
- Location within France
- Location: Hautes-Alpes, France

Grande Autane is a 2,782 m mountain in the Dauphiné Alps close to the cities of Gap and Ancelle in the département of Hautes-Alpes in France.
