= Tête du Colonney =

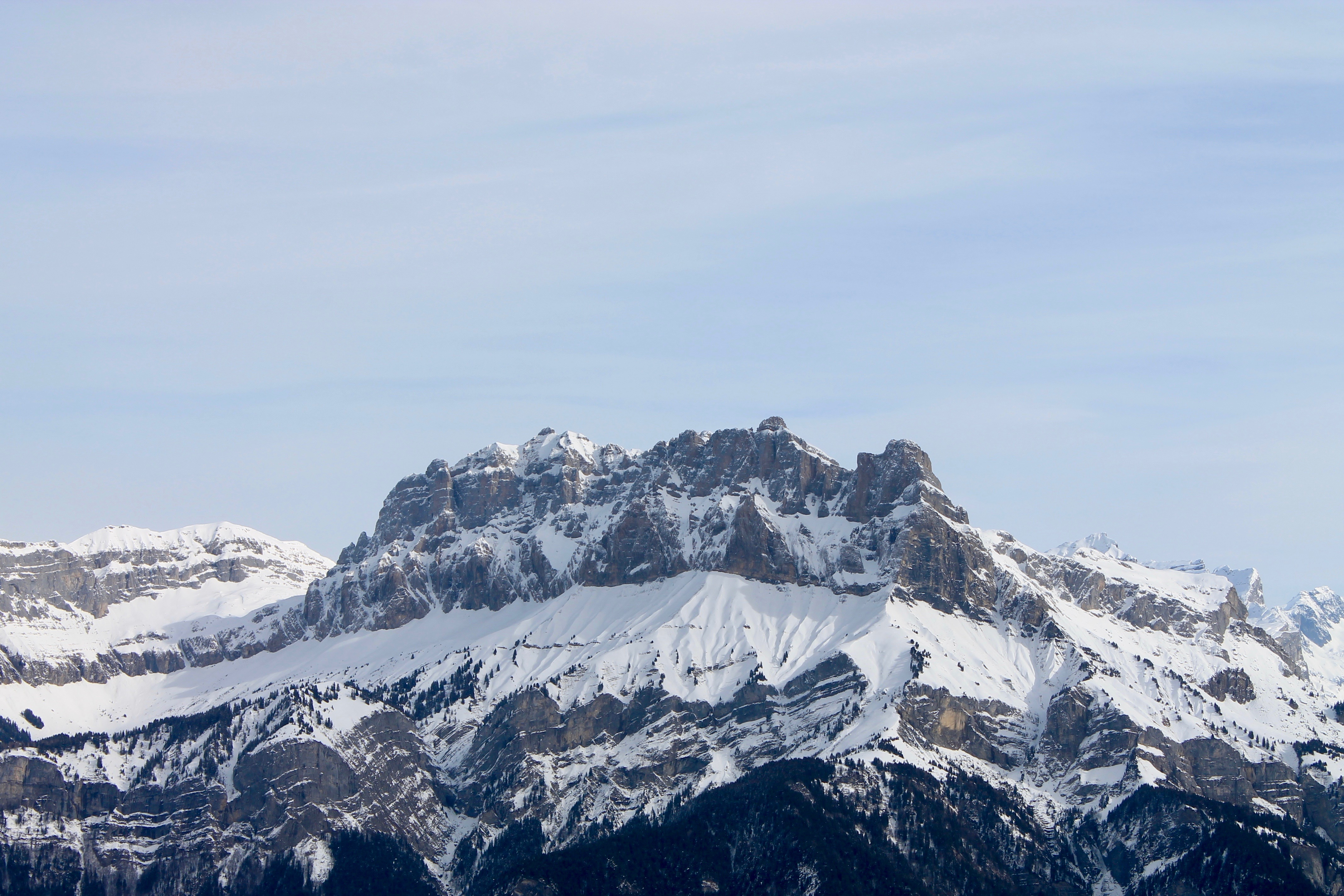
- Tête du Colonney

Highest point
- Elevation: 2,692 m (8,832 ft)
- Prominence: 528 m (1,732 ft)
- Coordinates: 45°58′22″N 6°41′25″E

Geography
- Location within Alps
- Location: Haute-Savoie, France
- Parent range: Chablais Alps

Tête du Colonney (French pronunciation: [tɛt dy kɔlɔnɛ]; 2,692 m) is a mountain in the Chablais Alps in Haute-Savoie, France.

Standing above the Plateau d'Assy, the mountain provides unobscured views of Mont Blanc to the southeast from its summit.

It is located in the Faucigny massif, west of the Platé desert, on the border of the communes of Sallanches and Passy.

The toponym Colonney has no certified Latin origin and is assumed to be of Celtic origin, with the Gaulish word colono meaning "common property". The Tête du Colonney materialized perhaps the boundary between two countries. On its foot, in the commune of Sallanches, another name is characteristic of the boundaries between territories: Arpenaz and its waterfall, of the Gaulish "arepennis" meaning end of the land.

== Access ==
Tête du Colonney can be reached from the North starting in Flaine, in the winter also by cable car. Alternatively it can be reached from the South from Praz Coutant.
