= Wildgrat =

Mountain of the Ötztal Alps in Tyrol, Austria

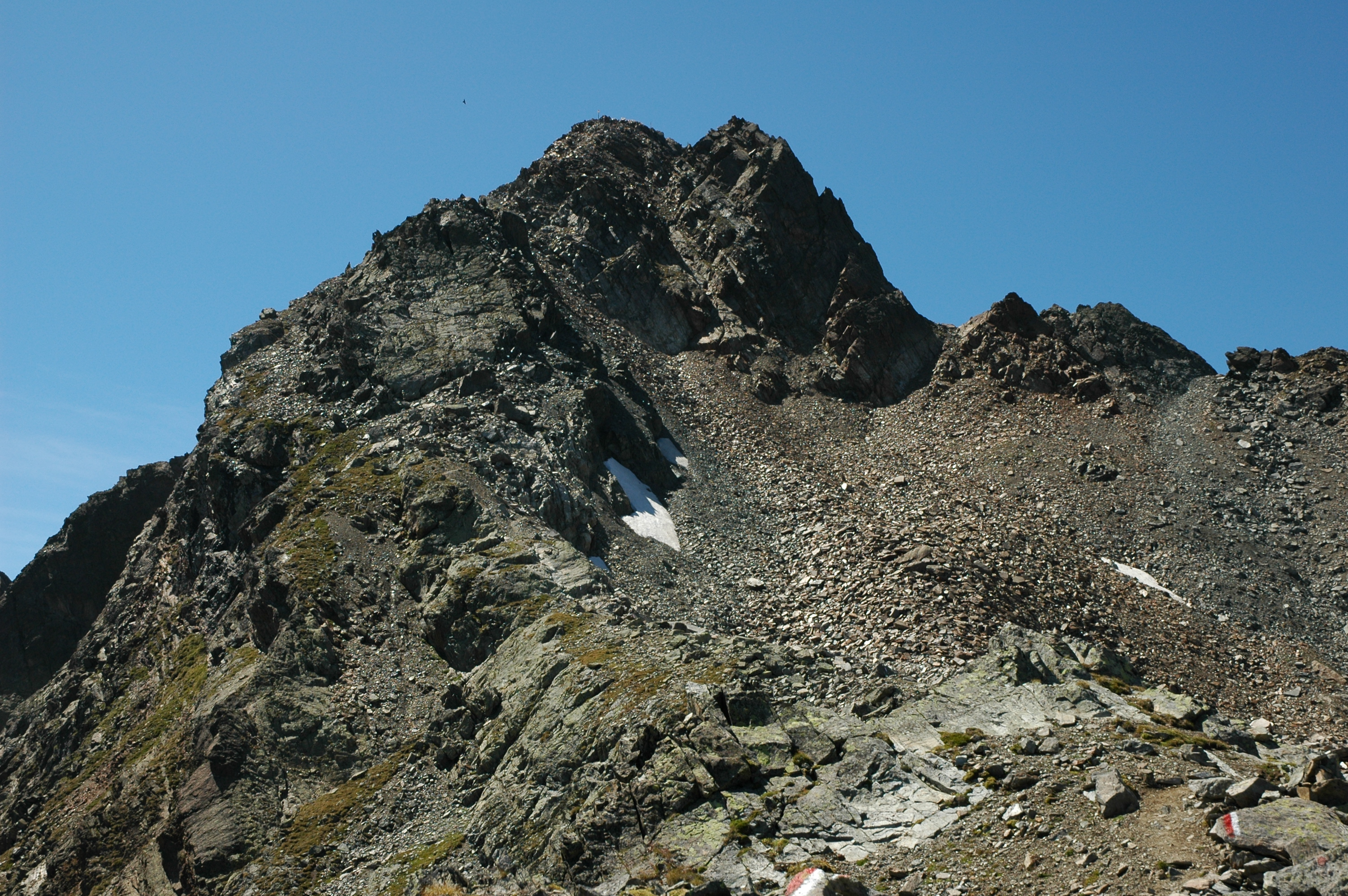
- Wildgrat from the east, on the approach from the Erlanger hut

Highest point
- Elevation: 2,971 m (9,747 ft)
- Prominence: 461 m (1,512 ft)
- Parent peak: Fundusfeiler
- Coordinates: 47°08′26″N 10°49′36″E

Geography
- Location within Austria
- Location: Tyrol, Austria
- Parent range: Ötztal Alps

Climbing
- First ascent: 1891 by F. and L. Lantscher with F. Gstrein (earlier by locals)

The Wildgrat is a mountain in the Geigenkamm group of the Ötztal Alps.

== See also ==
- List of mountains of the Alps
