= Tauernkogel (Venediger Group) =

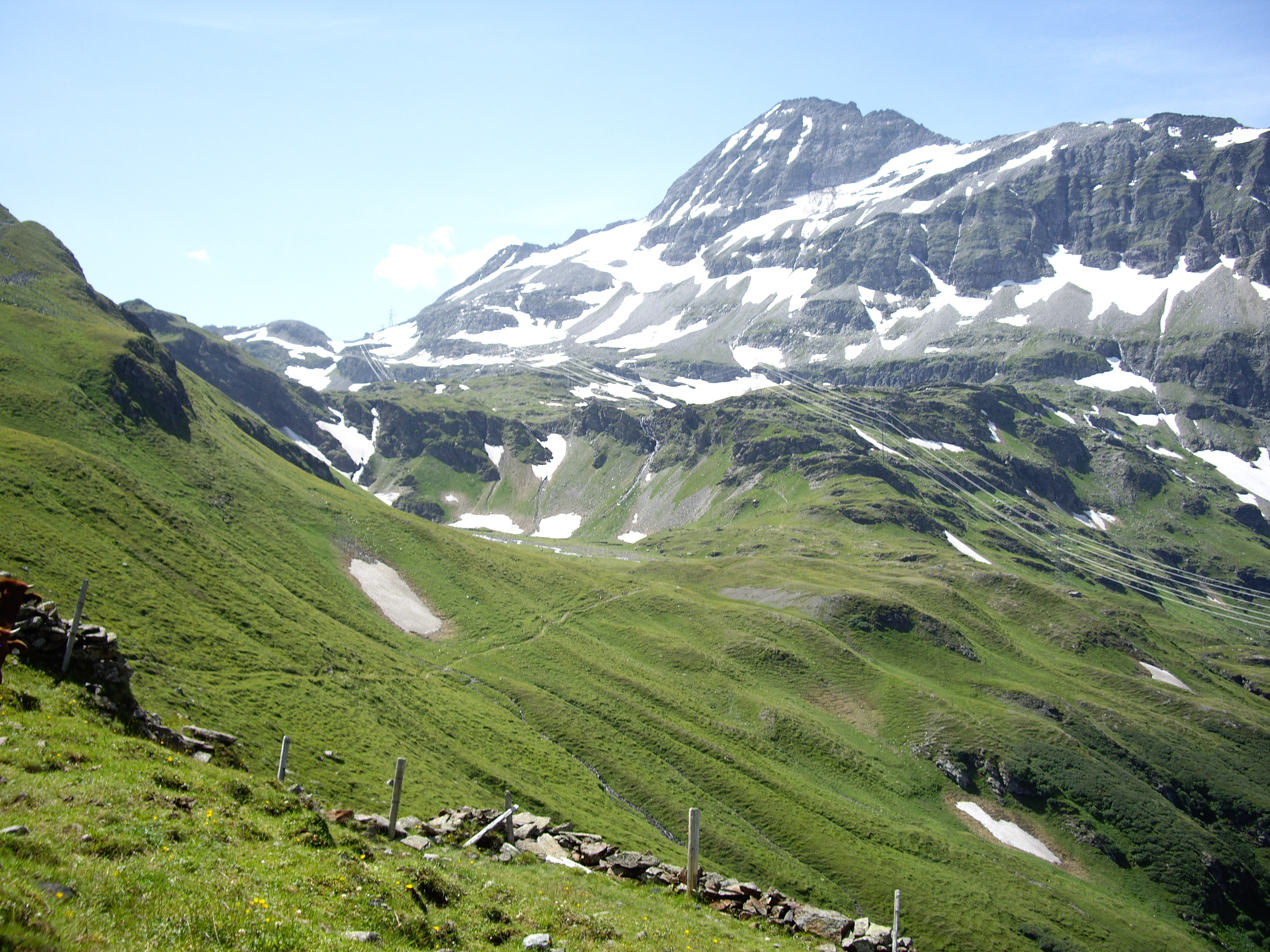

Highest point
- Elevation: 2,988 m (AA) (9,803 ft)
- Prominence: 375 m ↓ Dichtenscharte
- Isolation: 3.2 km → Rote Säule
- Coordinates: 47°09′28″N 12°29′01″E

Geography
- Location within Austria
- Location: Salzburg and Tyrol, Austria
- Parent range: Venediger Group

Climbing
- Normal route: East arête (I)

The Tauernkogel (also Felber Tauernkogel) is a mountain, 2,988 m (AA), in the Venediger Group of Austria's High Tauern. It lies west of the Felber Tauern and the border between the states of Salzburg and Tyrol runs over the summit. It may be climbed on a difficult mountain tour via a steep snowfield in about 1.½ hours from the St. Pöltner Hut.

The Felbertauern Tunnel on state route 108 runs under the pass.

== Sources ==
- Österreichische Karte (ÖK) des Bundesamtes für Eich- und Vermessungswesen (BEV).
- Alpine Club map: Venedigergruppe, German Alpine Club.
