= Dürrenstein (South Tyrol) =

Mountain in Italy

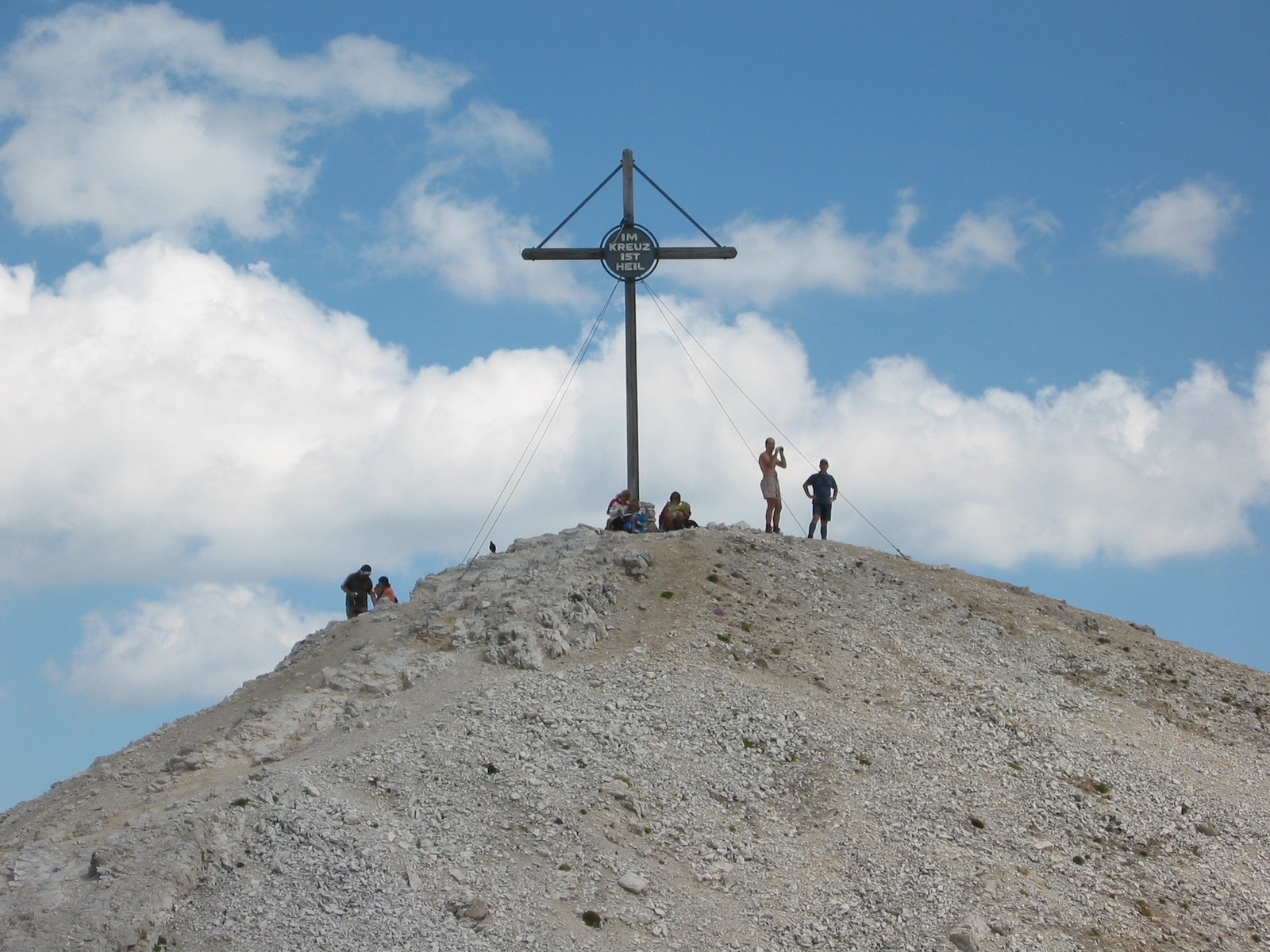
- Dürrenstein (2.839 m) in South Tyrol, 2007

Highest point
- Elevation: 2,839 m (9,314 ft)
- Coordinates: 46°40′24″N 12°11′04″E

Geography
- Location: South Tyrol, Italy
- Parent range: Dolomites

The Dürrenstein (Italian: Picco di Vallandro; German: Dürrenstein) is a mountain in the Dolomites in South Tyrol, Italy.
