= Rote Säule (Tauern) =

Mountain in Austria

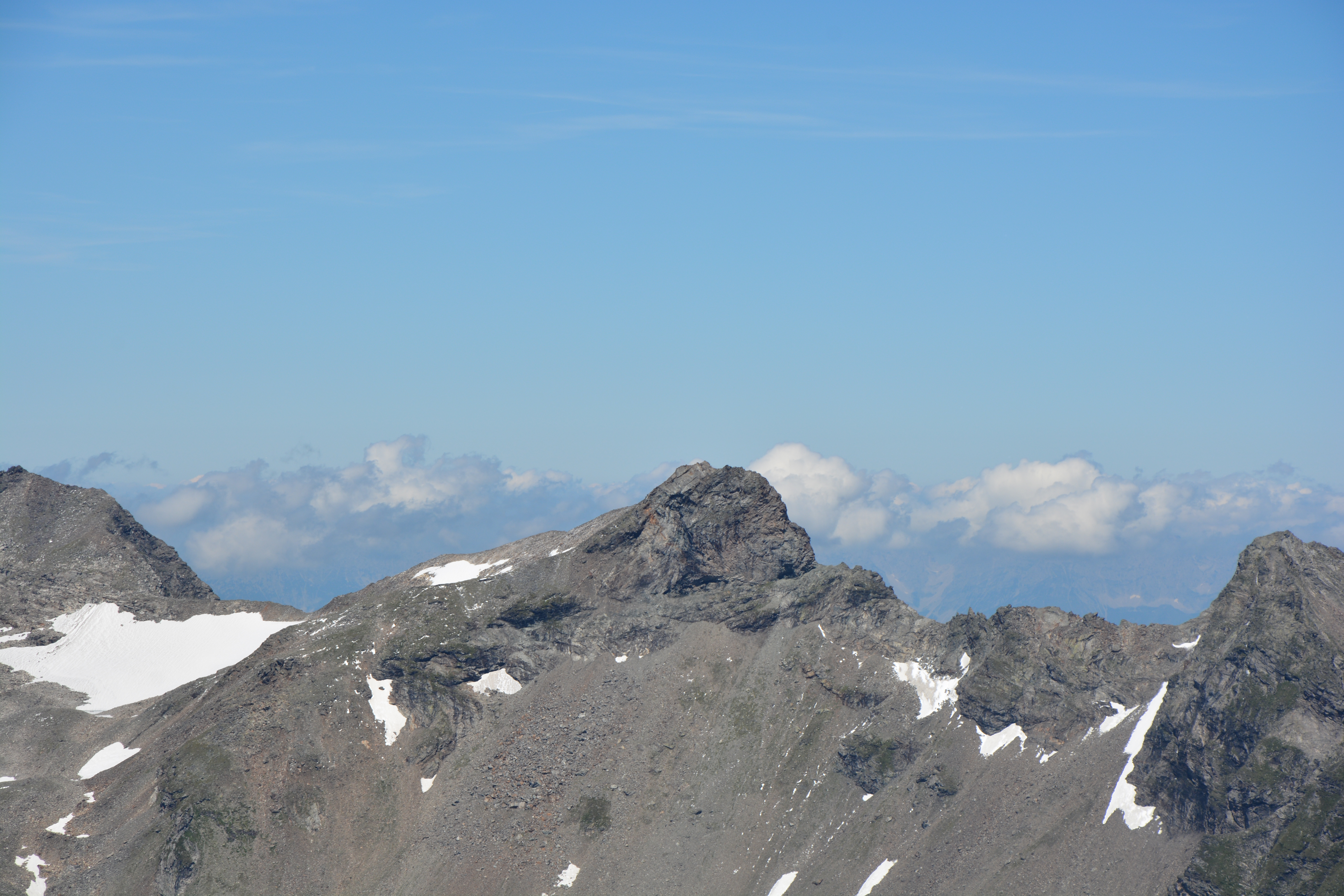
- The Rote Säule seen from the Wildenkogel

Highest point
- Elevation: 2,993 m (AA) (9,820 ft)
- Prominence: 303 m ↓ Rotebenscharte
- Isolation: 3.4 km → Kratzenberg
- Coordinates: 47°08′47″N 12°26′38″E

Geography
- Location within Austria
- Location: Salzburg and Tyrol, Austria
- Parent range: Venediger Group

Climbing
- First ascent: 1865 by Franz Keil (tourist and cartographer)
- Normal route: West ascent (I)

The Rote Säule (also Rote Saile) is a mountain, 2,993 m (AA), on the main chain of the Alps in the Venediger Group. It lies on the border between the Austrian states of Salzburg and East Tyrol.

== Location and ascent ==
The Rote Säule is a peak in the extreme north of the district of Lienz. It is located on the main chain of the Tauern between the Roter Kogel (2,946 m above sea level (AA)) to the southeast and the Abretter (2,979 m above sea level (AA)) to the northwest, the Rote Säule being separated from the Abretter by the col of Abretterscharte (2,856 m above sea level (AA)). The Rote Säule has a wide north and east face. To the south are the remains of a glacier, the Gschlößkees. The Rote Säule may be climbed from the Venedigerhaus, the route branching off from the Sandebentörl path towards the northwest.

== Literature ==
- Willi End, Hubert Peterka: Alpine Club guide Venedigergruppe. Bergverlag Rother, 5th edition, Munich, 2006, ISBN 3-7633-1242-0.
- Alpine Club map 1:25,000, Sheet 36, Venedigergruppe, ISBN 3-928777-49-1.
