= North Tyrol Limestone Alps =

Mountain range in Austria and Germany

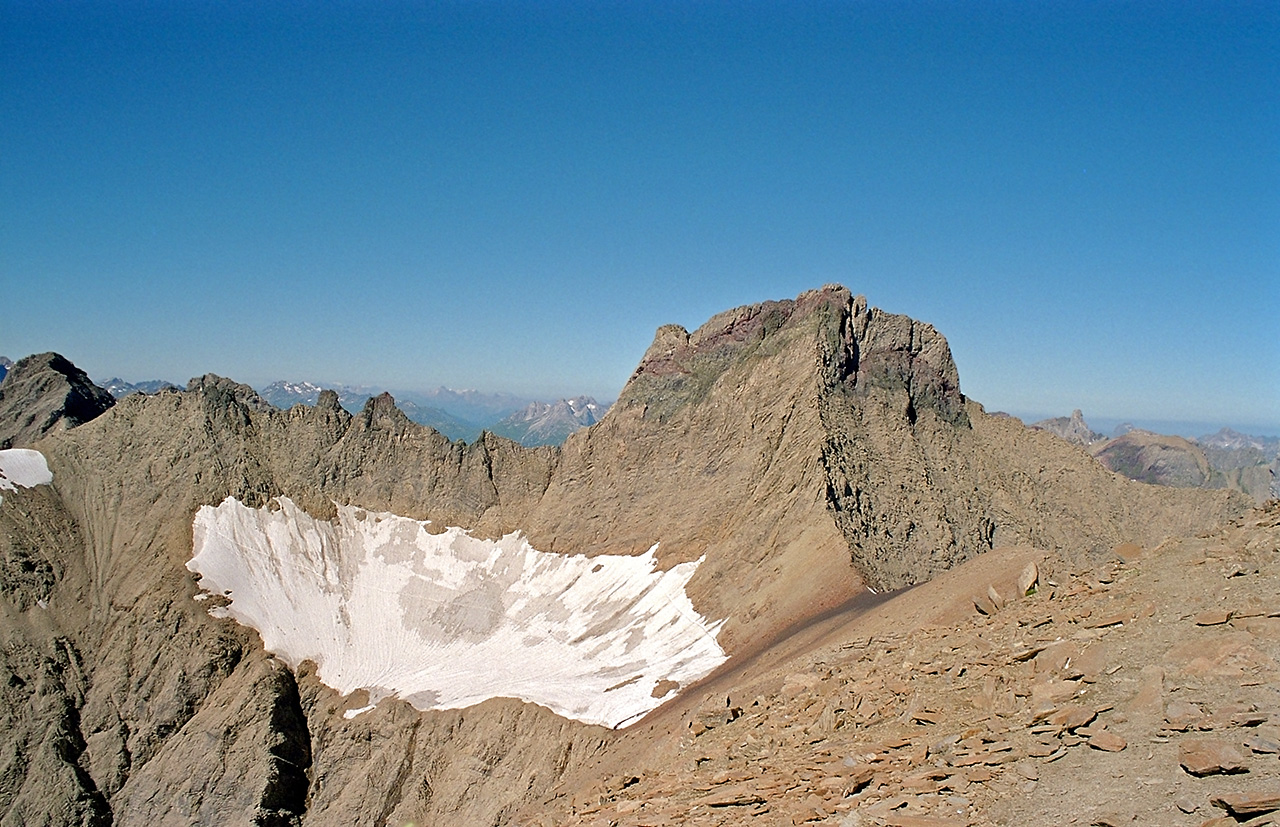
- Parseierspitze (3,036 m)

Highest point
- Peak: Parseierspitze
- Elevation: 3,036 m (9,961 ft)
- Coordinates: 47°10′28″N 10°28′42″E

Naming
- Native name: Nordtiroler Kalkalpen (German)

Geography
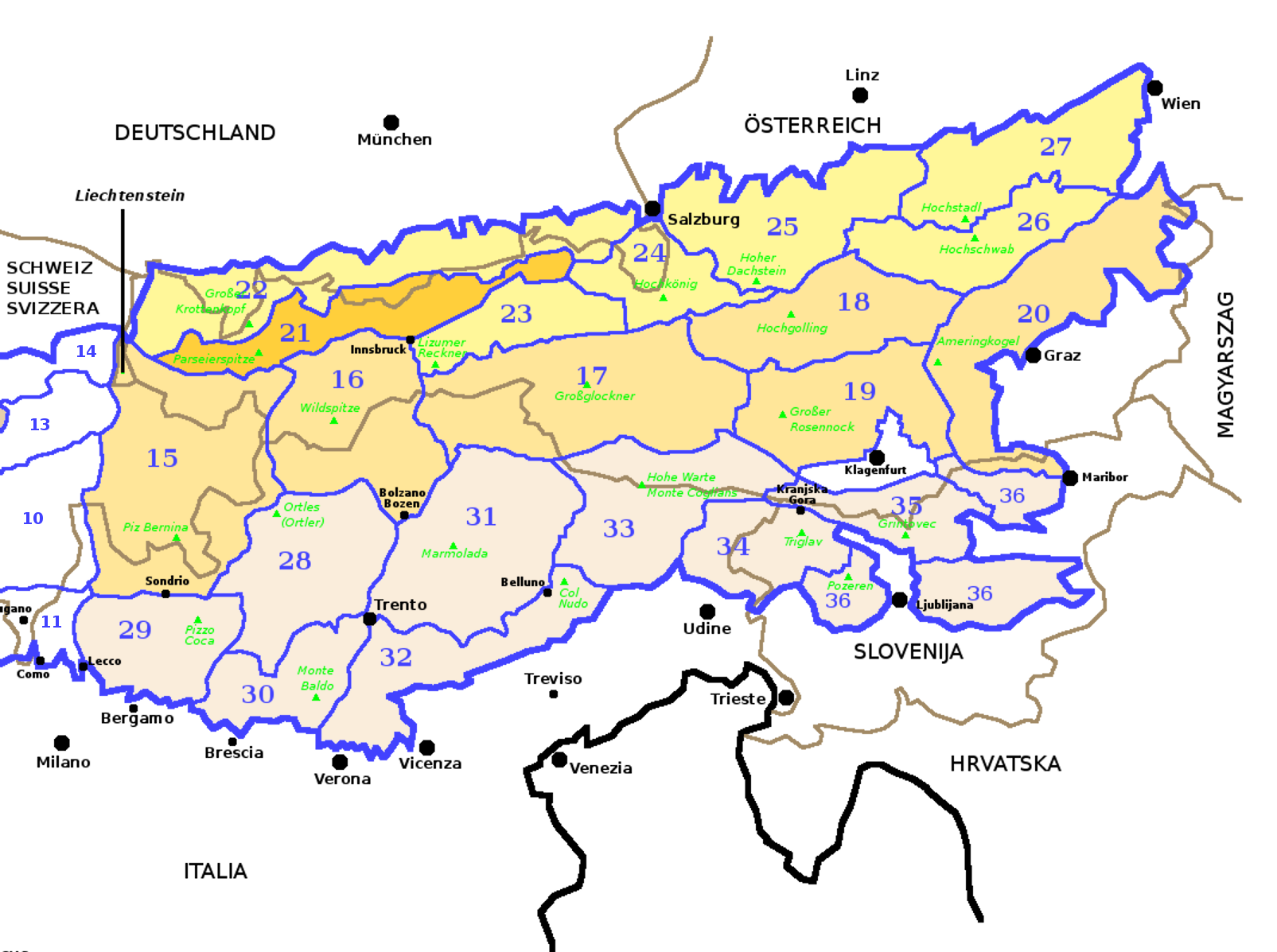
- North Tyrol Limestone Alps (section nr.21) within Eaestern Alps
- Countries: Austria and Germany
- States: Tyrol, Vorarlberg and Bavaria
- Parent range: Alps
- Borders on: Northern Salzburg Alps, Bavarian Alps, Tyrol Schistose Alps, Western Rhaetian Alps and Eastern Rhaetian Alps

Geology
- Orogeny: Alpine orogeny
- Rock type: Sedimentary rocks

The North Tyrol Limestone Alps (German: Nordtiroler Kalkalpen) are a mountain range located in Austria and, marginally, in Germany.

== Geography ==
Administratively the range belongs to the Austrian states of Tyrol and Vorarlberg and to the German state of Bavaria.

=== SOIUSA classification ===
According to SOIUSA (International Standardized Mountain Subdivision of the Alps) the mountain range is an Alpine section, classified in the following way:

- main part = Eastern Alps
- major sector = Northern Limestone Alps
- section = North Tyrol Limestone Alps
- code = II/B-21

=== Subdivision ===
The range is divided into six Alpine subsections:

- Lechtaler Alpen - SOIUSA code:II/B-21.I;
- Lechquellengebirge - SOIUSA code:II/B-21.II;
- Wettersteingebirge - SOIUSA code:II/B-21.III;
- Karwendel - SOIUSA code:II/B-21.IV;
- Brandenberger Alpen - SOIUSA code:II/B-21.V;
- Kaisergebirge - SOIUSA code:II/B-21.VI.

== Notable summits ==
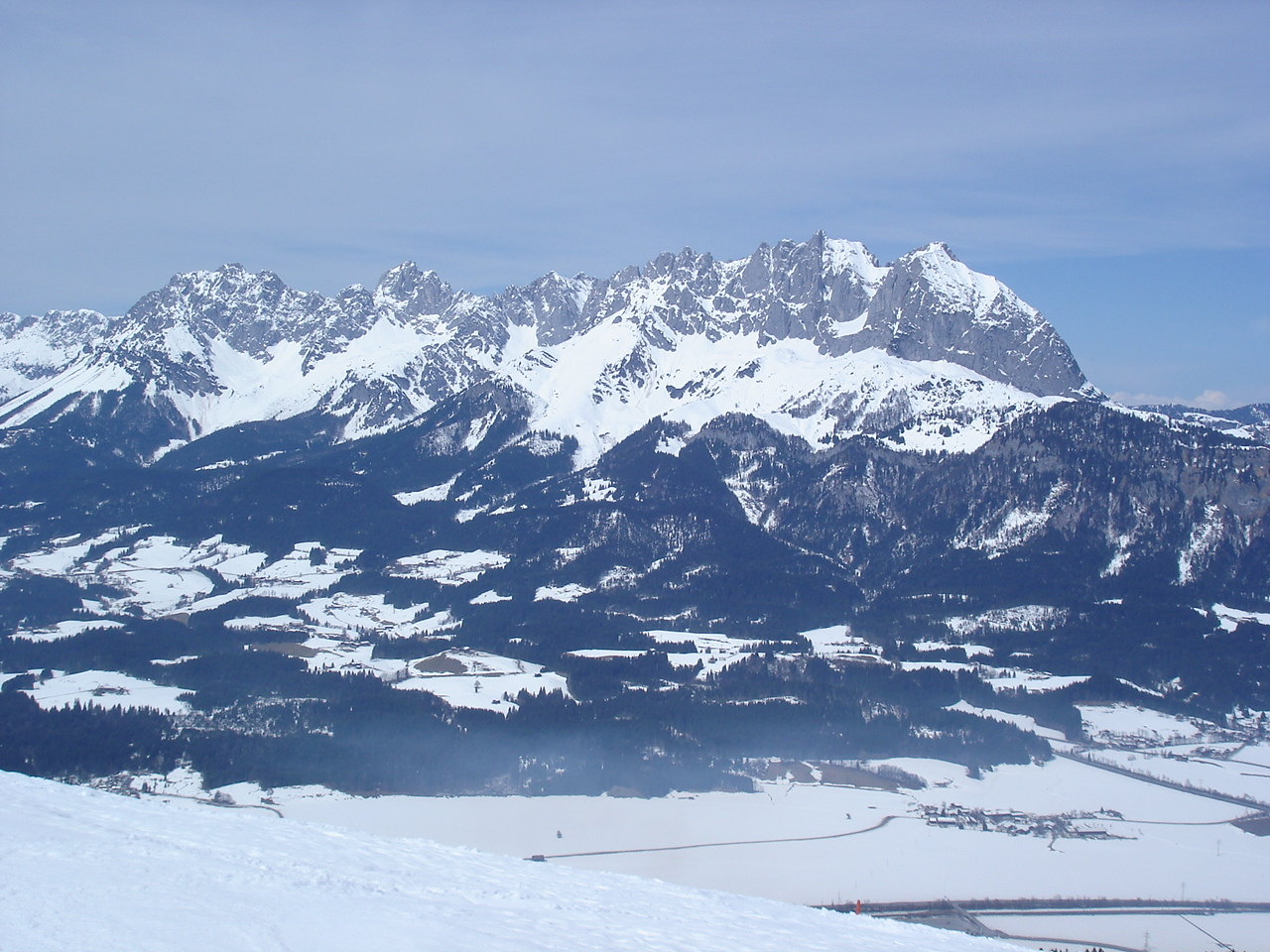
Kaisergebirge, view from south

Some notable summits of the range are:

Name	metres	feet
Parseierspitze	3,036	9,961
Zugspitze	2,961	9,718
Feuerspitze	2,852	9,357
Birkkarspitze	2,749	9,019
Rote Wand	2,704	8,869
Hochwanner	2,744	9,003
Ellmauer Halt	2,344	7,690
