= Fallenbacherspitze =

Mountain in Tyrol, Austria

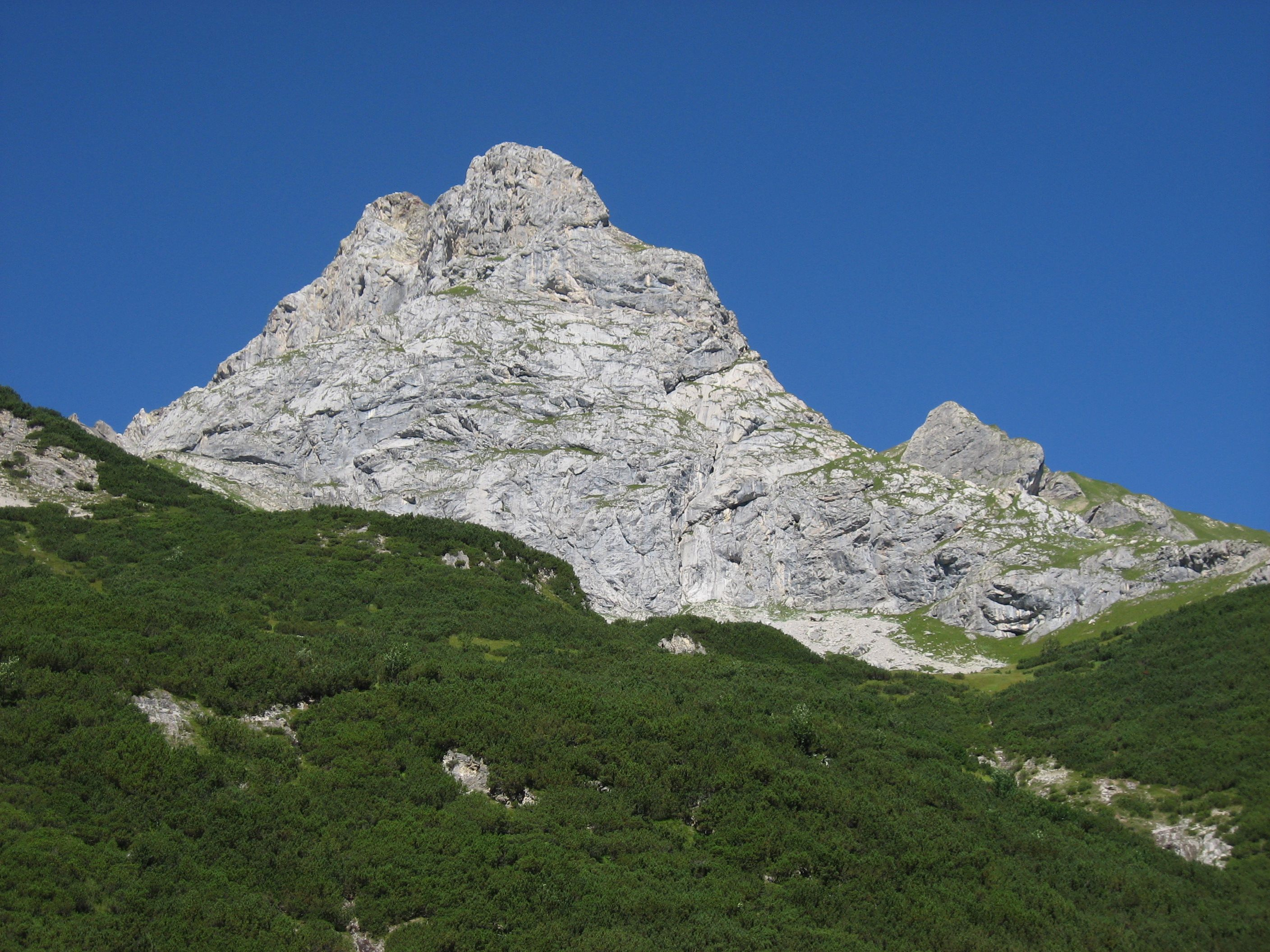
- South face of the Fallenbacherspitze

Highest point
- Elevation: 2,723 m (AA) (8,934 ft)
- Isolation: 1.22 km (0.76 mi) to Feuerspitze
- Coordinates: 47°12′02″N 10°23′25″E

Geography
- Location within Austria
- Location: Tyrol, Austria
- Parent range: Lechtal Alps

The Fallenbacherspitze (also: Fallenbacher Spitze, Fallenbacher-Spitze) in the Austrian state of Tyrol is a 2,723-metre-high rock summit in the Lechtal Alps. Due to its remoteness and lack of signed routes, the mountain is not climbed very often.

== Location and area ==
The Fallenbacherspitze lies in the middle of the Lechtal Alps, about eight kilometres south of Bach. Apart from its main summit (2,723 m), the massif has another, clearly lower summit on the southeast ridge, the Gamskarlespitze (2,469 m). It is bounded to the east and south by the Alperschontal valley, that runs from the Madau. To the southwest it continues via the wind gap of Gamskarscharte and the Fallenbacher Turm (2,704 m) to the Feuerspitze (2,852 m). The cirque of Das Fallenbacher Kar lies on the west flank of the mountain and leads to the Mittelrücken (2,625 m) and the Holzgauer Wetterspitze (2,895 m). In the valley of Fallenbacher Tal north of the mountain lies a small lake, the Fallenbacher See. Further away from the Fallenbacherspitze lies the Vorderseespitze (2,889 m) to the southwest and the Freispitze (2,884 m) to the east, on the other side of the Alperschontal. In summary, several of the largest and most striking summits of the Lechtal Alps are concentrated within a radius of less than 3 kilometres around the Fallenbacherspitze.

== Bases and tours ==
The Fallenbacherspitze is climbed relatively rarely. Suitable bases for an ascent are Bach or Madau. The simplest, albeit unsigned, route runs from the Alperschontal via the Gamskarle and the southwest ridge to the plateau-like summit. Its difficulty is mainly level I, in one place it reaches level II on the UIAA scale.

== Literature and map ==
- Dieter Seibert: Alpine Club Guide Lechtaler Alpen, Munich, 2002, ISBN 3-7633-1268-4
- Alpine Club Map 1:25.000, Sheet 3/3, Lechtaler Alpen, Parseierspitze
