= Schönwies =

Municipality in Tyrol, Austria

- Municipality
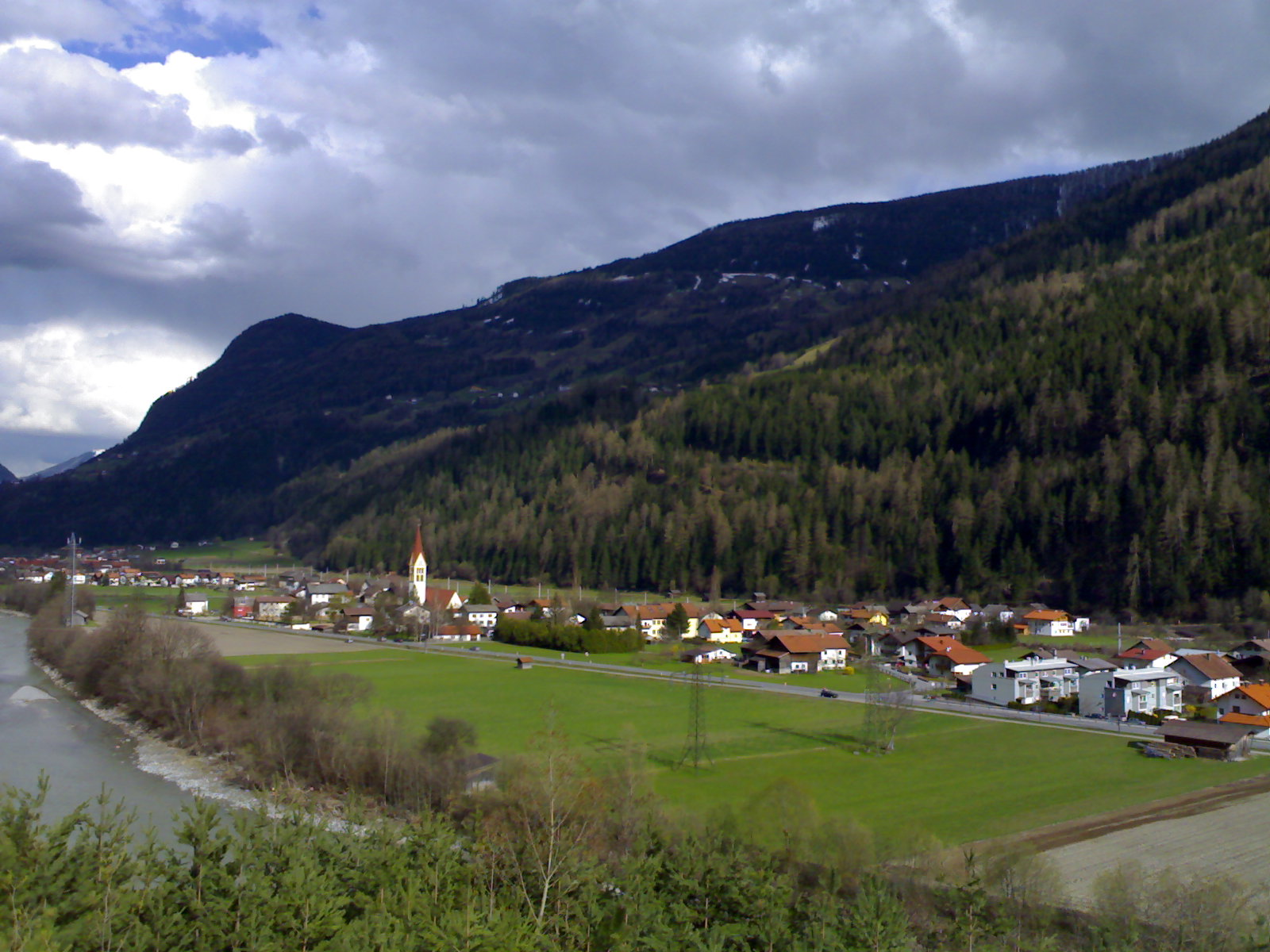

- Coat of arms

- Location within Austria
- Coordinates: 47°11′50″N 10°39′22″E
- Country: Austria
- State: Tyrol
- District: Landeck

Government
  - Mayor: Reinhard Raggl

Area
  - Total: 31.34 km^{2} (12.10 sq mi)
- Elevation: 737 m (2,418 ft)

Population (2018-01-01)
  - Total: 1,697
  - Density: 54.15/km^{2} (140.2/sq mi)
- Time zone: UTC+1 (CET)
  - Summer (DST): UTC+2 (CEST)
- Postal code: 6491
- Area code: 05418
- Vehicle registration: LA
- Website: www.schoenwies. tirol.gv.at

Schönwies is a municipality in the district of Landeck in the Austrian state of Tyrol located 8 km northeast of the city of Landeck and 7 km west of the city of Imst. The main source of income is the mining of limestone ballast stone.

The highest point in the municipality is the Große Schlenkerspitze (2,827 m), which is also the highest mountain in the eastern Lechtal Alps.

== Gallery ==
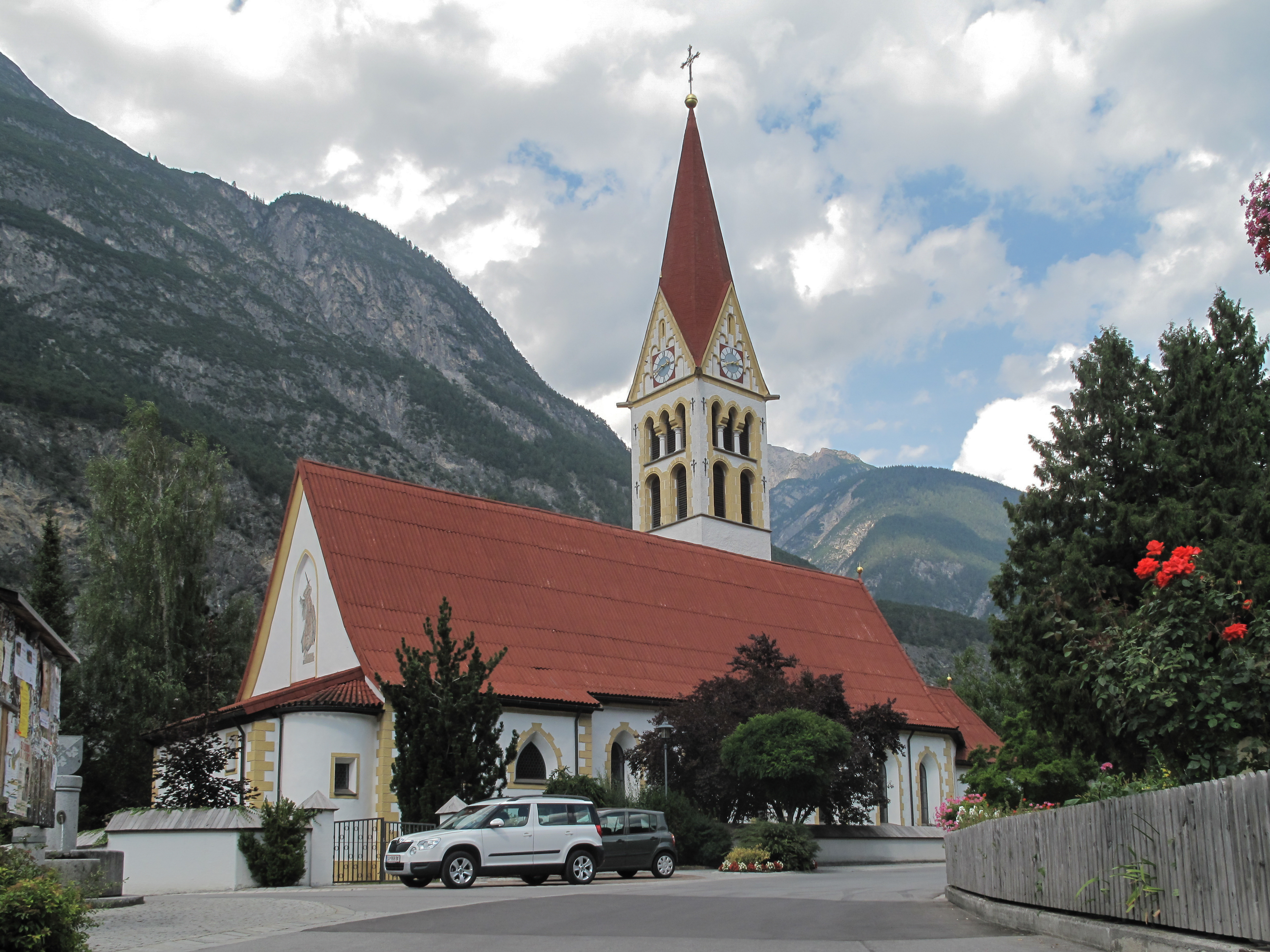
Schönwies, church: Pfarrkirche Sankt Michael

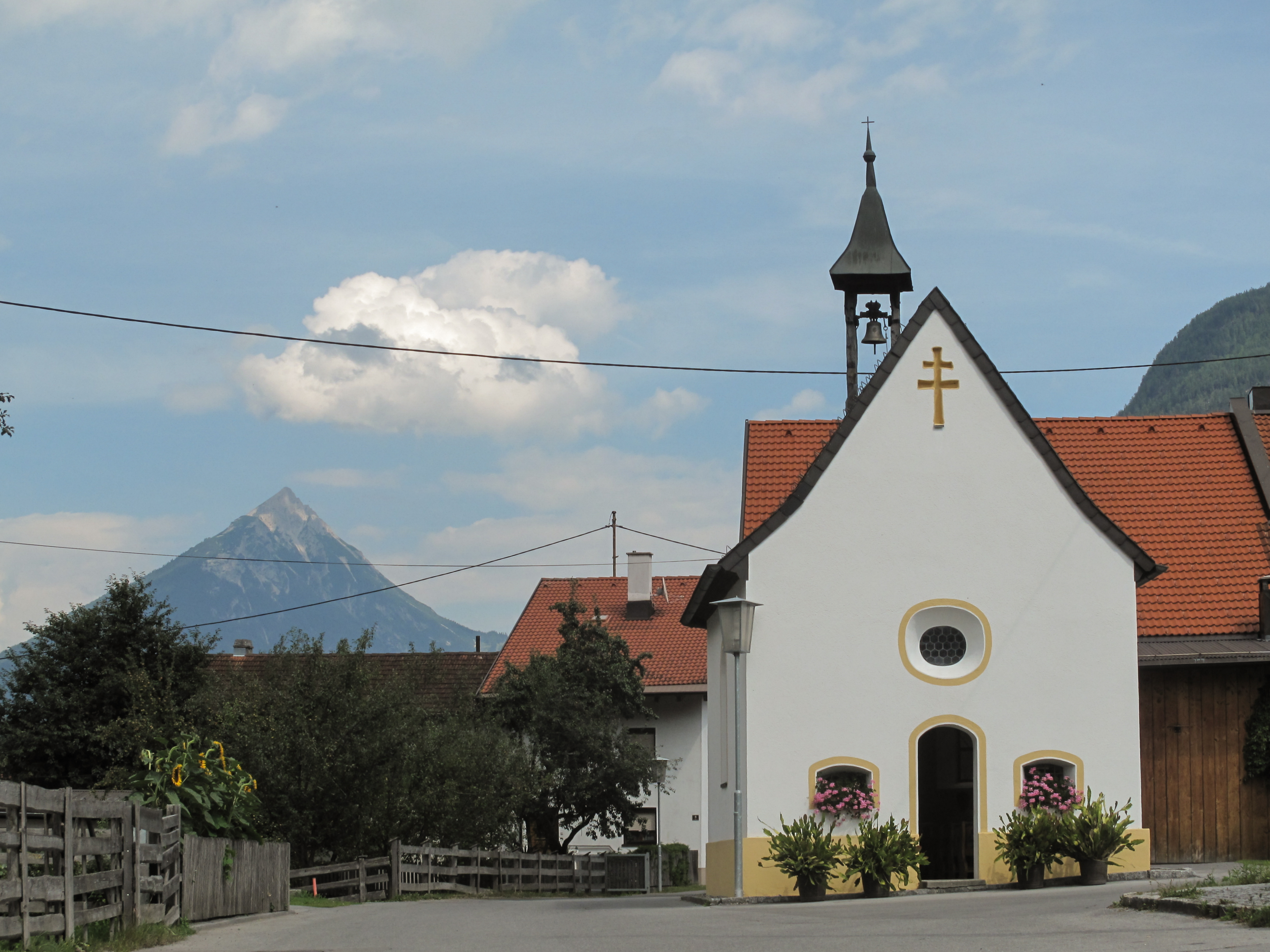
Schönwies, chapel

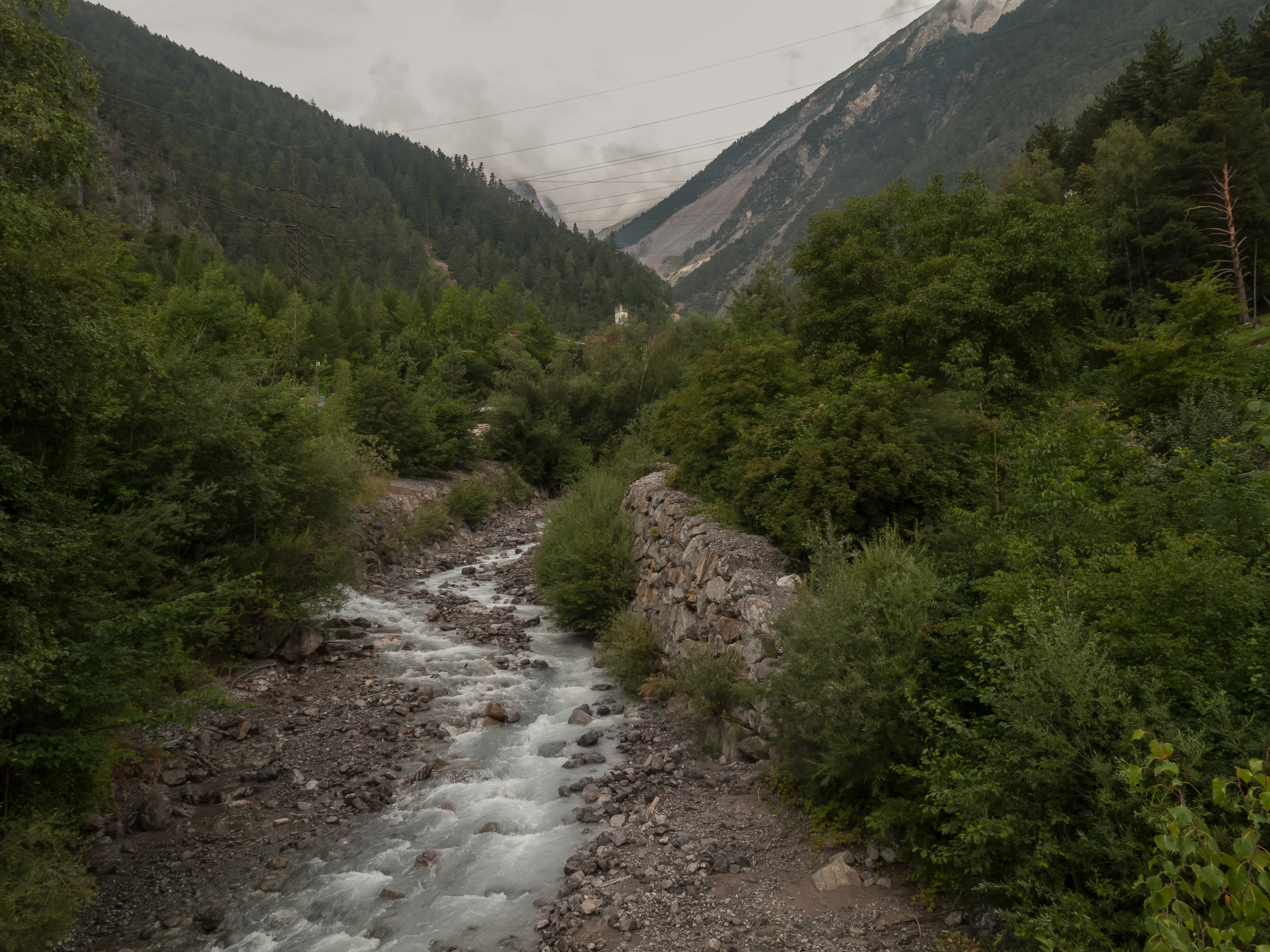
near Starkenbach, creek

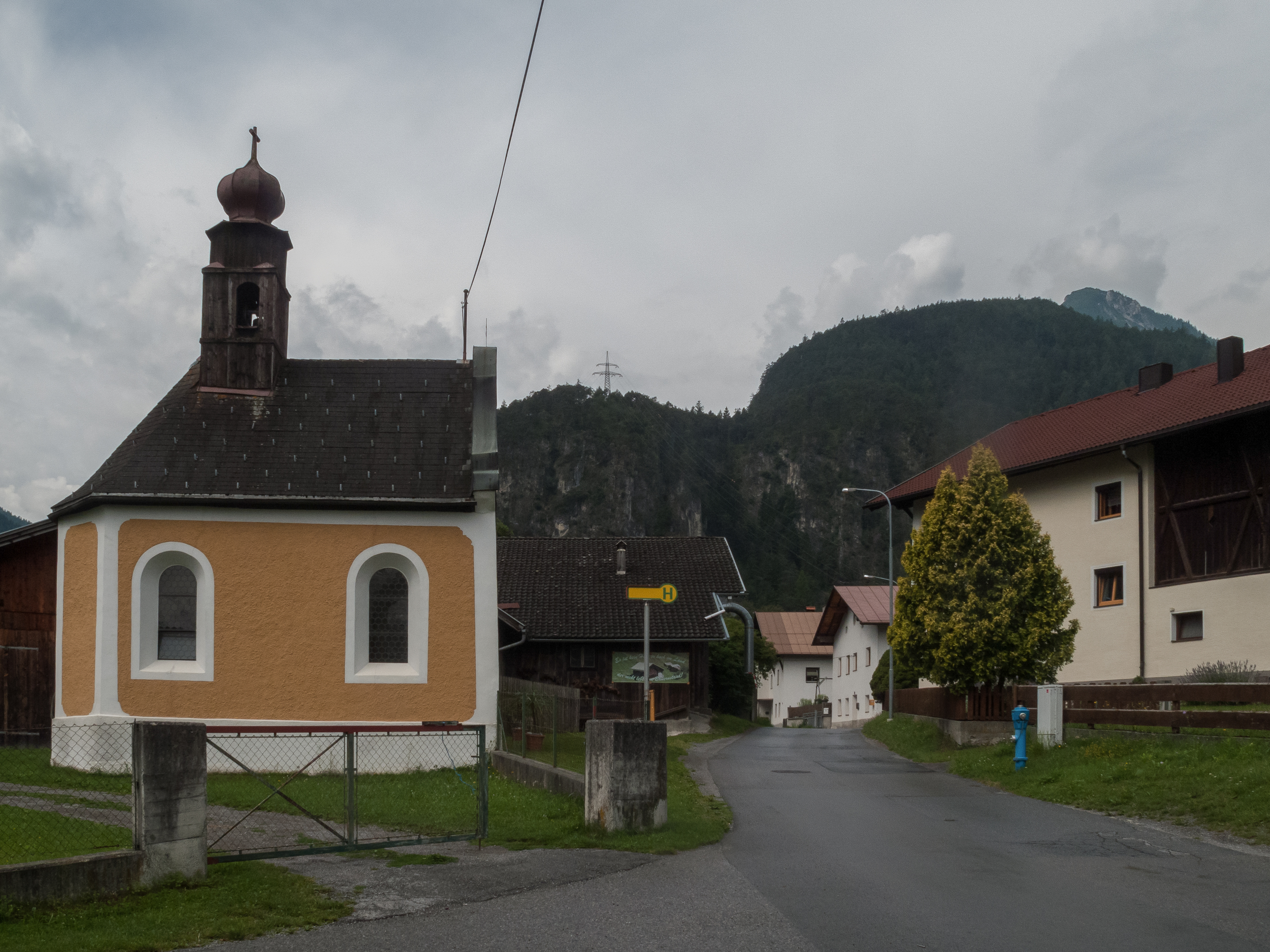
Starkenbach, chapel: Kapelle Sankt Laurentius und Heilige Kreuz

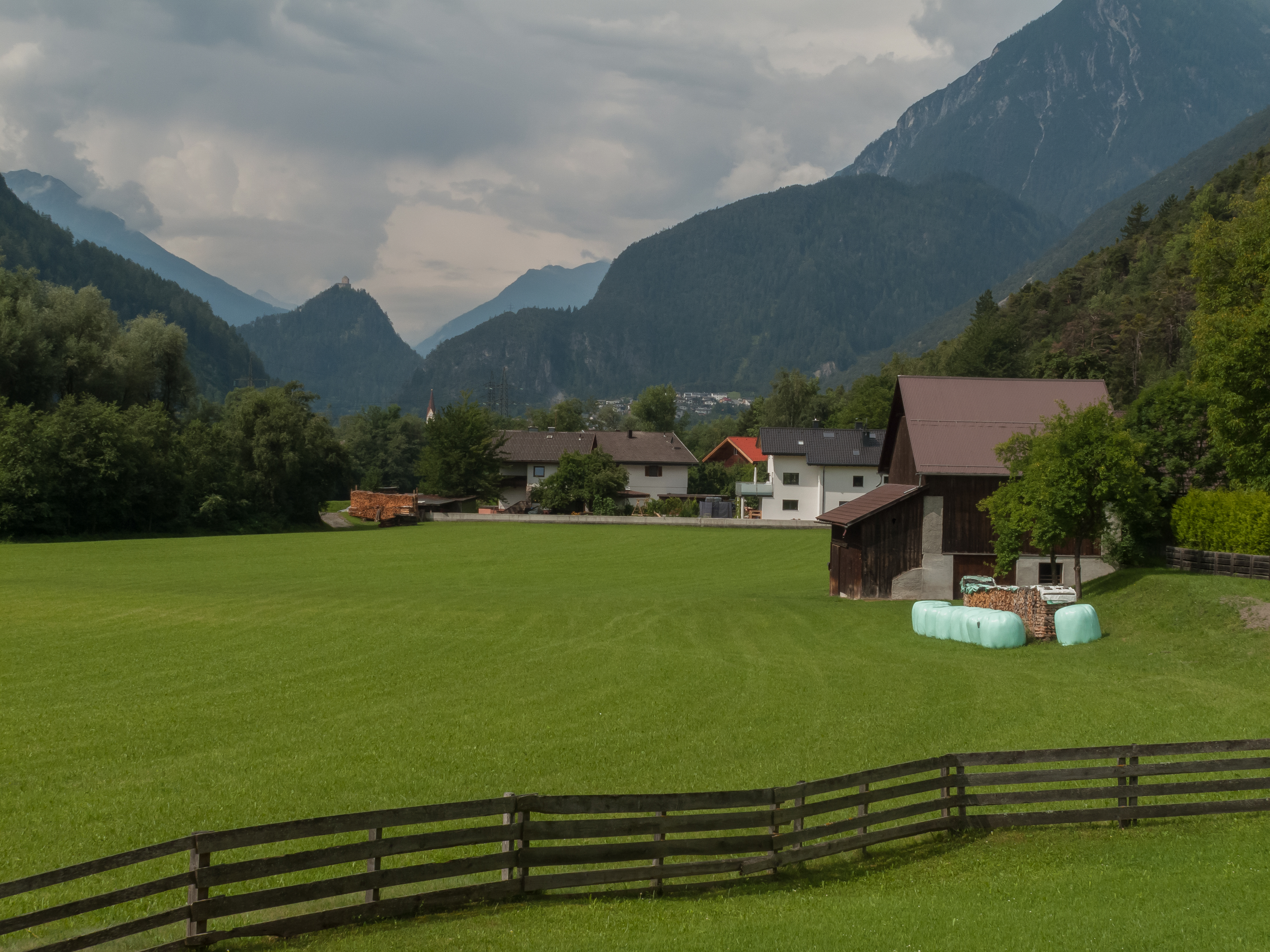
Grieshaus, view to the village
