= Küchlspitze =

Mountain in North Tyrol, Austria

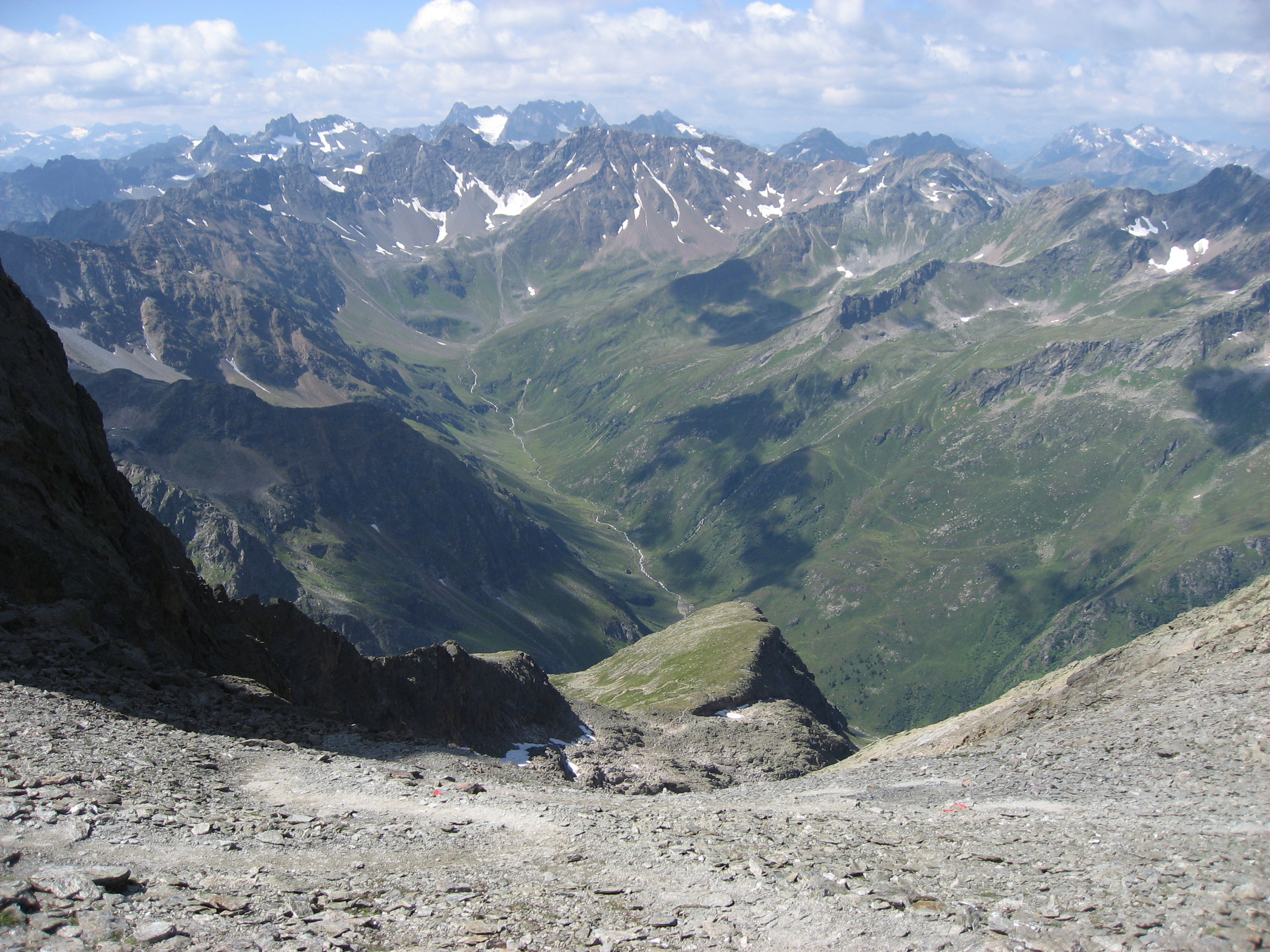
- View of the Malfont valley in the Verwall with the Küchlspitze (annotated) in the far distance.

Highest point
- Elevation: 3,147 m (AA) (10,325 ft)
- Prominence: 132 m (433 ft)
- Isolation: 0.8 km (0.50 mi) to Kuchenspitze
- Coordinates: 47°02′29″N 10°13′57″E

Geography
- Location within Austria
- Location: Tyrol, Austria
- Parent range: Kuchenspitze Group in the Verwall Group, Central Eastern Alps

Climbing
- First ascent: Survey engineers around 1860

The Küchlspitze (also: Küchelspitze) is a three-thousander (3,147 m above sea level (AA)) in the Verwall between the valley of Stanzer Tal and Paznaun in the western North Tyrol in Austria.

== Location and landscape ==
The mountain rises between St. Anton am Arlberg in the Stanzer valley and Ischgl in the Paznaun to the southeast. Northeast of the summit is the Darmstädter Hut.

The Küchlspitze (which means "little Kuchenspitze") is the third highest peak in the range after the Hoher Riffler and 1 metre higher Kuchenspitze immediately to the north. It is a striking, three-sided pyramid. On the main ridge the eastern arête descends to the Rautejöchli (2,757 m above sea level (AA)) and Rautekopf (2,849 m above sea level (AA)), the southwestern arête to the Schönpleisjöchli (2,757 m above sea level (AA)) and twin peaks of the Schönpleisköpfe (northern 2,243 m above sea level (AA), southern 2,920 m above sea level (AA)), and the northern arête runs in an S-shape to the Kuchenspitze. The mountain is glaciated; in the north cirque (Nordkar) of the Kuchenspitze lies the Großer Küchlferner glacier. The Kleine Küchlferner on the western flank is only a glacial remnant.

The Große Küchlferner drains into the Kartellspeicher reservoir and the Moosbach into the Rosanna, the west flank, with a tarn at 2,530 m above sea level (AA) into the Fasulbach, which empties into the upper Rosanna. The Madleinalpe to the southeast, which also has several tarns, drains via the Madleinbach into the Trisannna.

== Development and ascents ==
The first ascents of the summit were made by survey engineers accompanied by a local chamois hunter as part of the Third k.u.k. State Survey around 1860, in the course of which the main chain of the Verwall was negotiated.

The mountain is rarely visited today. It may be ascended, for example, from St. Anton from the Schönverwall near the Konstanzer Hut directly or via the Kuchenjöchl saddle, or via the Moosbach valley (Kartellspeicher), and from the south from Ischgl across the Madleinalpe, or from Mathon via the Friedrichshafner Hut. The Darmstädter Hut is usually used as the base. Ascents of the summit are then difficult at the very least (east arête UIAA grad II/SACSAC ZS-), in places challenging climbing (e.g. over the Küchlspitze and the south ridge IV+).
