= Vorderseespitze =

Mountain in Tyrol, Austria

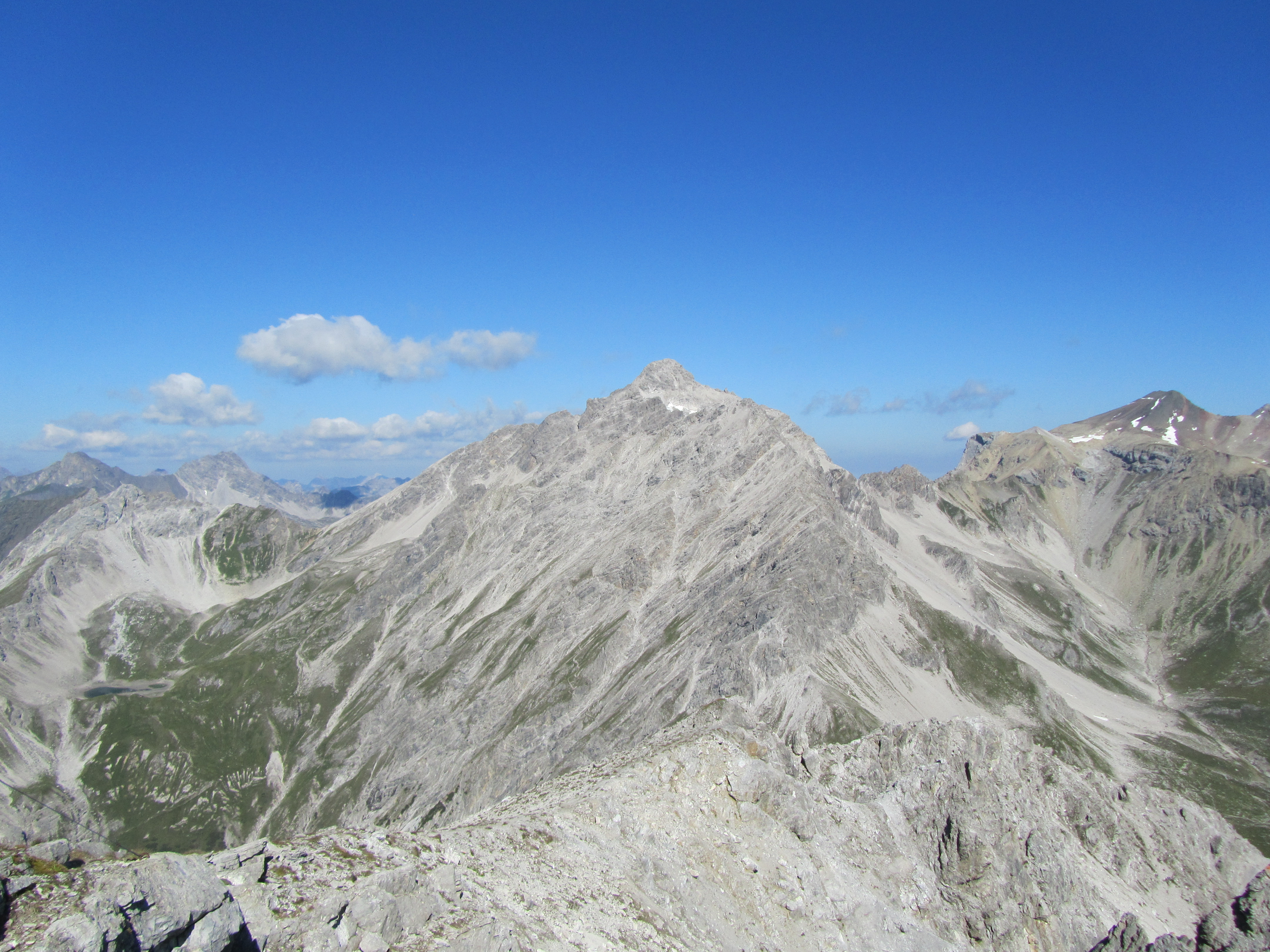
- The Vorderseespitze, seen from the Samspitze

Highest point
- Elevation: 2,889 m (AA) (9,478 ft)
- Prominence: 313 m ↓ Stierlahnzugjoch
- Isolation: 2.4 km → Wetterspitze to Holzgauer Wetterspitze
- Coordinates: 47°11′05″N 10°22′02″E

Geography
- Location within Austria
- Location: Tyrol, Austria
- Parent range: Lechtal Alps

Geology
- Rock type: main dolomite

Climbing
- First ascent: 1855 by locals
- Normal route: South Gully (Südschlucht), grade II in good conditions

The Vorderseespitze is a mountain in the Lechtal Alps, Tyrol, Austria. At 2,889 m (AA) it is the eighth highest peak in the Lechtal Alps. The Lech Valley Ridgeway (Lechtaler Höhenweg) runs over its southeastern flank from Kaiserjochhaus to the Ansbacher Hut. According to the literature it was first climbed in 1855 by locals from Kaisers in the Lech Valley.

== Summit block ==
The Vorderseespitze is made from the sedimentary rock, main dolomite and is the highest main dolomite summit of the Northern Limestone Alps. On its northeast flank lies the little, tongue-shaped and heavily crevassed Vorderseeferner, the largest glacier of the Lechtal Alps. The mountain is separated from the Aperriesspitze (2,588 m) by the Hinterseejoch (2,482 m). To the west of this saddle, in a cirque, lies the lake of Hintersee, east of the col is lake of Vordersee which gives the mountain its name. The neighbouring peak to the north is the Feuerspitze.

== Base and tours ==
The base for an ascent is the Ansbacher Hut at 2,376 metres. The normal route, the easiest climb, runs either along the north arête, according to the literature at climbing grade II, or up the northeast flank, also at UIAA grade II. An ascent along the east arête is slightly more difficult. The journey time is generally 3½ hours from the Ansbacher Hut. The northeast flank is also possible as an extreme ski tour.

== Literature and map ==
- Dieter Seibert: Alpine Club guide Lechtaler Alpen, Munich, 2002, ISBN 3-7633-1268-4
- Alpine Club map 1:25,000, Sheet 3/3, Lechtaler Alpen, Parseierspitze
