= Imster Muttekopf =

Mountain in Tyrol

Muttekopf
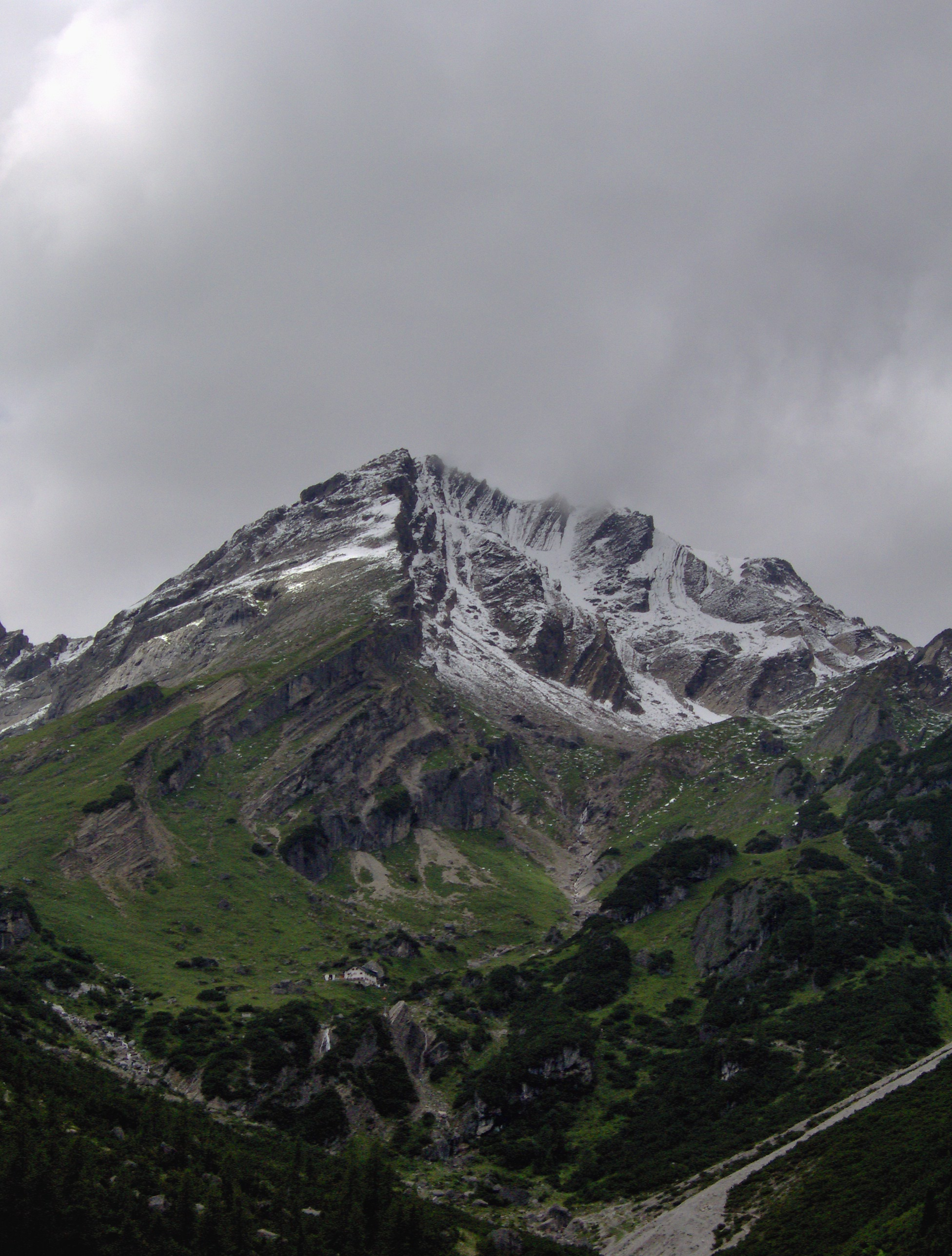
- The Imster Muttekopf. Just under the summit is the Muttekopf Hut

Highest point
- Elevation: 2,774 m (AA) (9,101 ft)
- Coordinates: 47°16′03″N 10°39′06″E

Geography
- Location within Austria
- Location: Tyrol, Austria
- Parent range: Lechtal Alps

The Muttekopf (Imster Muttekopf, 2,774 m (AA)) is a lookout mountain in the Lechtal Alps in the Austrian state of Tyrol. It lies northwest of Imst and immediately south of the Hahntennjoch saddle.

The path runs from Imst along a road or through the narrow Rosengarten Gorge to Hochimst. From there it takes about 2 hours on a footpath to reach the Muttekopf Hut (1,934 m above sea level (AA)). Alternatively a chair lift may be taken to the top station of the Untermarkt Chairlift and from there in about half an hour to the managed hut which is at roughly the same altitude.

From the hut the route follows a steep path, that is unattractive for an Alpine trail, up to the Muttekopfscharte col and from there gently climbs up to the Muttekopf, taking 2 to 3 hours from the hut. In dry weather this can be walked without difficulties and is apparently suitable for children. Another ascent starts at the Pfafflar (1,619 m above sea level (AA)) and runs through the Fundaistal and up the Kübelwände to the summit.

The crossing to the Hanauer Hut also runs via the Muttekopfscharte col. It is not difficult in dry weather, but it is long.

Geologically the Muttekopf is characterised by conglomerate rocks of the Gosau Group.

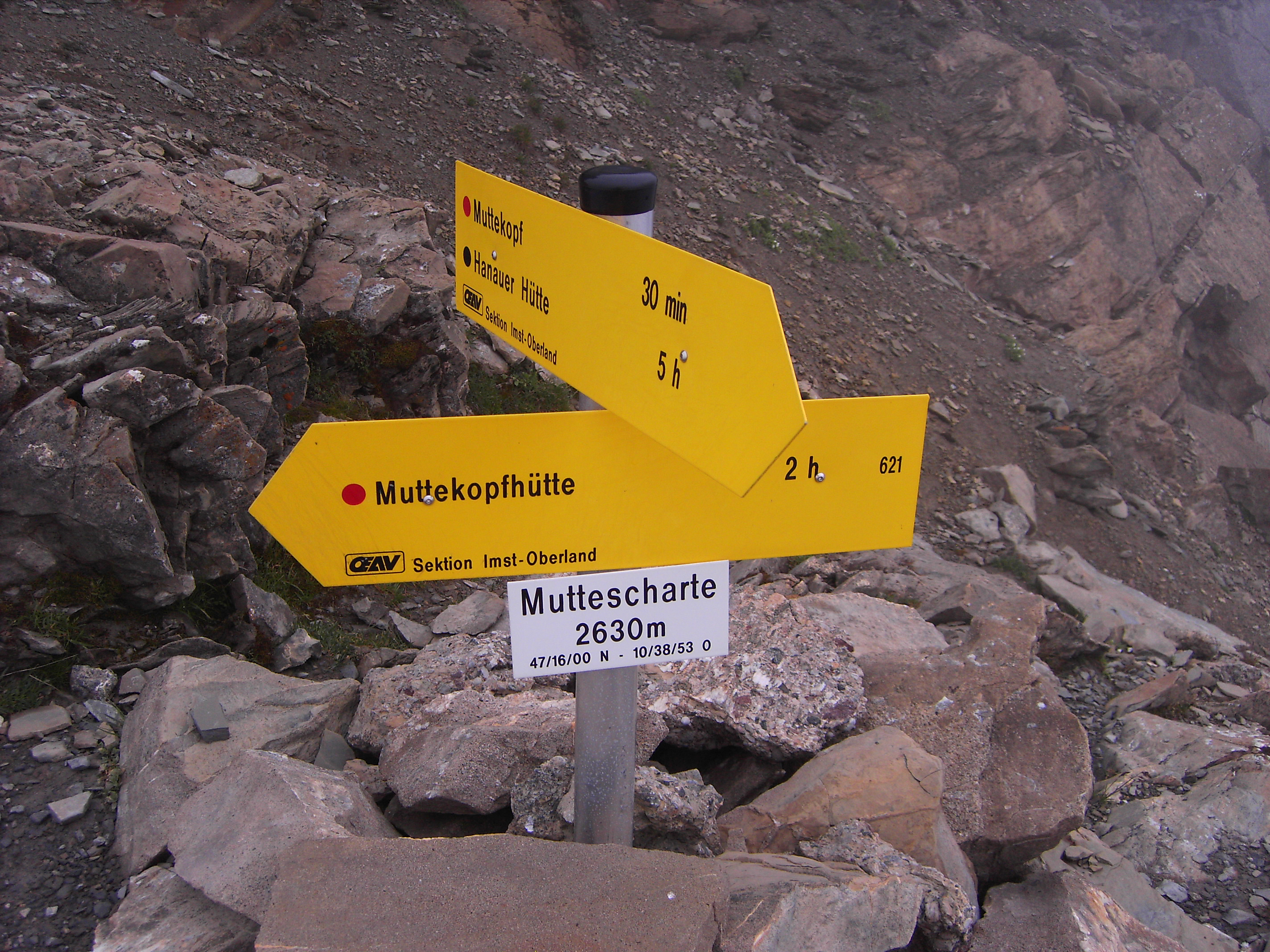
Waysign on the Muttekopfscharte

== Literature ==
- Heinz Groth: Alpenvereinsführer Lechtaler Alpen, Bergverlag Rother, Munich, out of print.
- Dieter Seibert: Alpine Club guide alpin, Lechtaler Alpen, Bergverlag Rother Munich, ISBN 978-3-7633-1268-9
