= Kuchenspitze =

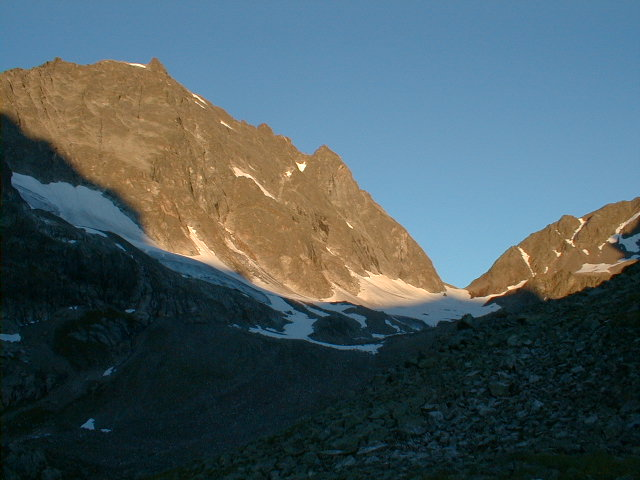
- The Kuchenspitze (top left) and the Großer Kuchenferner glacier (centre and left). The col is the Kuchenjöchli (centre right).

Highest point
- Peak: Not the main summit
- Elevation: 3,148 m (AA) (10,328 ft)
- Prominence: 578 m ↓ Lattejoch
- Isolation: 13.0 km → Hoher Riffler to Hoher Riffler
- Listing: Alpine mountains above 3000 m
- Coordinates: 47°02′54″N 10°13′48″E

Geography
- Location within Austria
- Location: Tyrol, Austria
- Parent range: Verwall Group

Climbing
- First ascent: 3 September 1977 by Andreas Madlener und Julius Volland

The Kuchenspitze is a mountain, 3,148 m (AA), in the Verwall between the valley of Stanzer Tal and Paznaun in the west of North Tyrol.

== Location and landscape ==
The mountain rises south of St. Anton am Arlberg in the Stanzer valley. Northeast of the summit is the Darmstädter Hut.

The Kuchenspitze is the second highest peak in the Verwall Group after the Hoher Riffler. Its main summit is not the 3148 spot height, but the peak to the south; to the north are several other subpeaks. The mountain is glaciated. In its north cirque (Nordkar) is the Großer Kuchenferner; to the west, the Kleiner Kuchenferner; and, to the south, between the main summit and the subpeak of the Küchlspitze (3,147 m), is the Großer Küchlferner. The ridge continues northwards via the col of Kuchenjöchl (2,730 m) to the Scheibler (2,978 m) and the Kartell Group above St. Anton. The Kuchenspitze is a little to the north of the main chain of the Verwall, which runs over the Küchlspitze. The entire west side of the mountain drains into the Kartellspeicher reservoir and the Moosbach into the Rosanna, the west flank into the Fasulbach, which empties into the upper Rosanna.

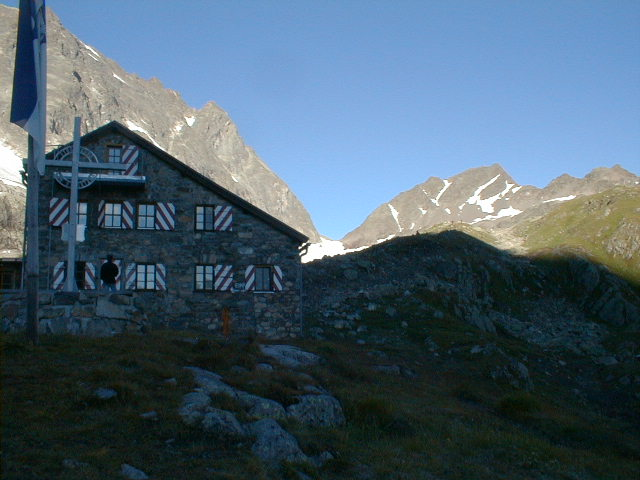
The Darmstädter Hut with the Kuchenjöchl behind. Right: the Scheibler; left: the north top of the Kuchenspitze.

== Ascent ==
Two of the peaks, including point 3148, were first climbed by Andreas Madlener and Julius Volland on 3 September 1877, the actual main summit by Wilhelm Strauß with his guides, Josef Ladner and Gottlieb Lorenz on 19 September 1884. At that time it was one of the few unclimbed main summits of the group, because the main chain of the Verwall was ascended around 1860 as part of a state survey.

Today, the mountain is rarely visited. It may be ascended, for example, from St. Anton in the Verwall valley near the Konstanzer Hut directly or via the Kuchenjöchl, or up the Moosbach valley, and from the south from Ischgl via the Madleinalpe, or from Mathon via the Friedrichshafner Hut. The Darmstädter Hut usually the base. The routes to the summit are then at least difficult (UIAA grade II/SAC WS) and, in places, challenging climbs.
