= Gaisspitze =

- Geißspitze
- Location within Alps

Highest point
- Elevation: 2,779 m (9,117 ft)
- Parent peak: Glatter Berg
- Isolation: 1 km
- Coordinates: 46°59′29″N 10°10′59″E

Geography
- Location: Tyrol, Austria
- Parent range: Verwall Alps

Climbing
- Normal route: via Muttenjoch

The Gaisspitze (also called Geißspitze) is a cone shaped mountain in the Verwall Alps in the Austrian state of Tyrol and north of the municipality Galtür. It has an elevation of 2,779 m (AA).

The nearest taller mountain is the Glatter Berg (2866 m), about 1 km north. They are separated via the col Muttenjoch (2620 m).

There are two alpine club huts nearby:

- Heilbronner Hütte (2,329 m)
- Friedrichshafener Hütte

Normal routes to the summits are from both huts via Muttenjoch.

== Literature ==
- Peter Pindur, Roland Luzian, Andreas Weiskopf: Verwallgruppe. Alpenvereinsführer, 10th edition, Bergverlag Rother, Munich 2005, pages 155–155–156, ISBN 3-7633-1251-X
