= Scheibler (mountain) =

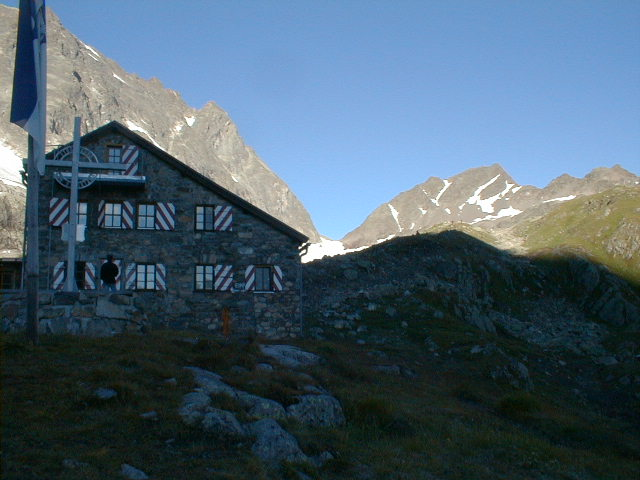
- Scheibler (right), Darmstädter Hütte in front

Highest point
- Elevation: 2,978 m (9,770 ft)
- Prominence: 188 m (617 ft)
- Parent peak: Kuchenspitze
- Isolation: 0.8 mi (1.3 km)
- Coordinates: 47°03′31″N 10°13′19″E

Geography
- Location within Alps
- Location: Tyrol, Austria
- Parent range: Verwall Alps

Climbing
- Normal route: via Kuchenjöchli

Scheibler is a 2,978 m (AA) high mountain in the Verwall Alps in the Austrian state Tyrol.

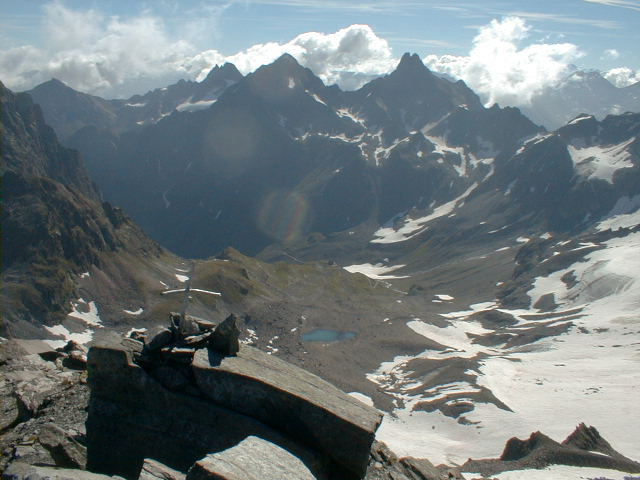
View from summit to the direction of Darmstädter Hütte

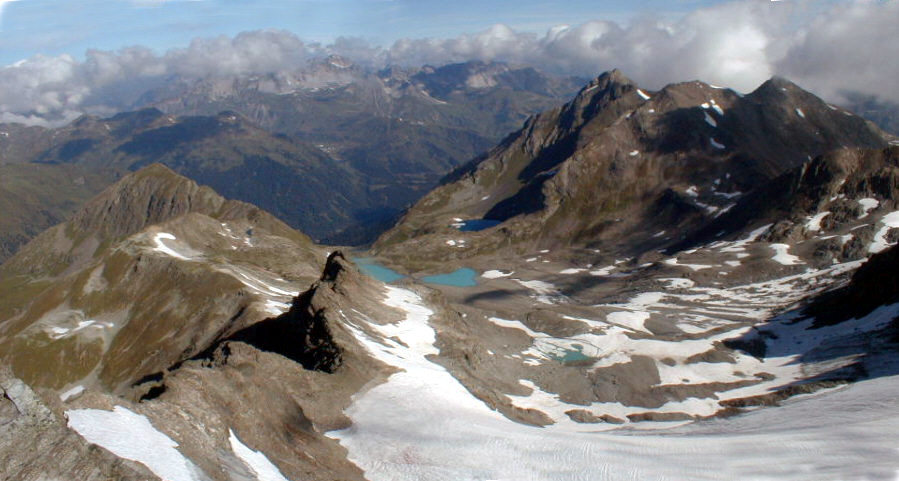
View from summit

There are directs ascents from two alpine club huts:

- From Darmstädter Hütte (2384 m, east of Scheibler) in two hours.
- From Konstanzer Hütte (1688 m, north-west of Scheibler) in three hours.

Both ascents meet at Kuchenjöchli, the 2,730-metre-high (8,960 ft) col between Scheibler and Kuchenspitze.
