= Galzig =

Mountain in the Lechtal Alps of Tyrol

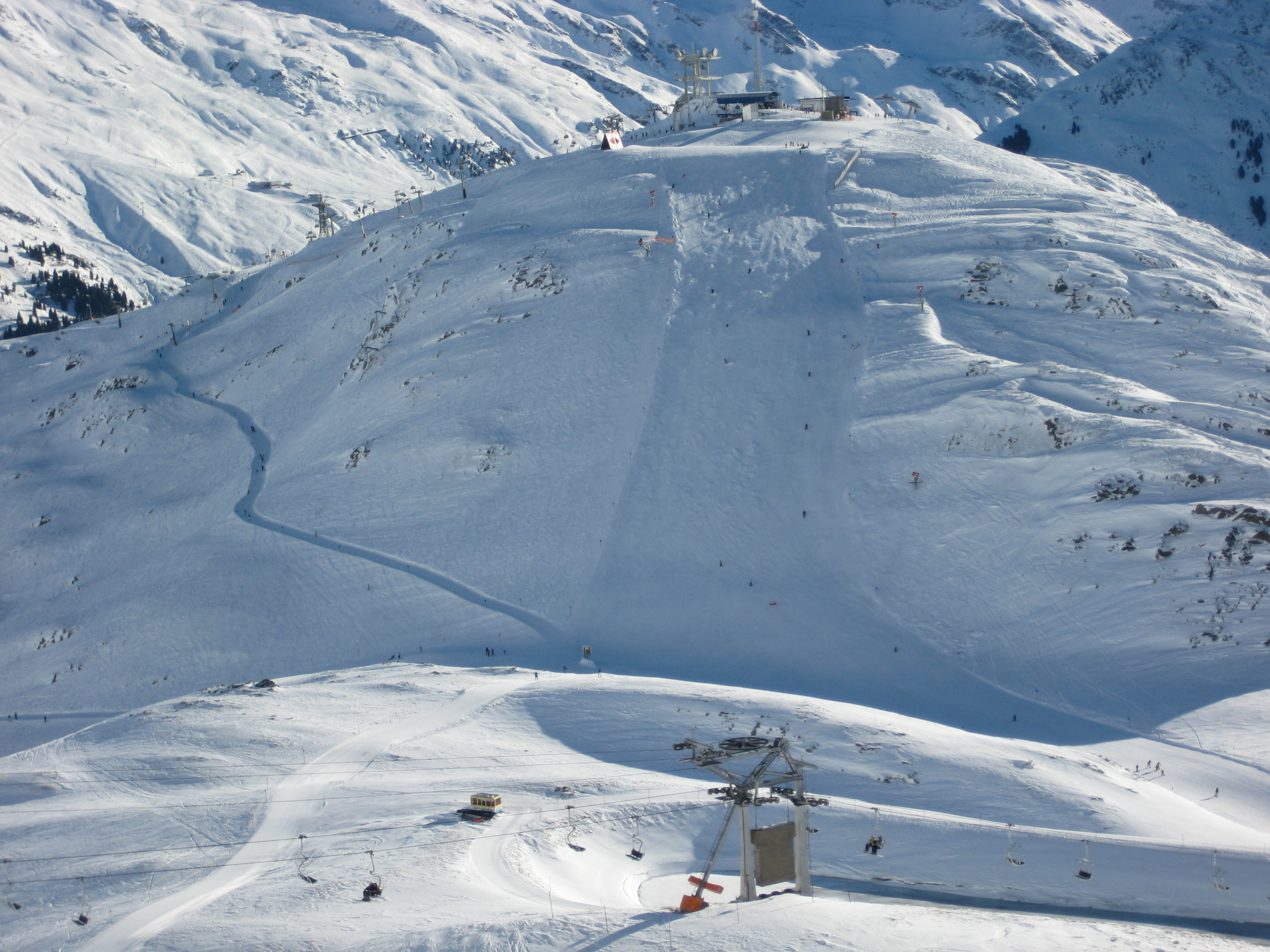
- Galzig

Highest point
- Elevation: 2,184 m (7,165 ft)
- Isolation: 1.03 km (0.64 mi) to Gendarm
- Coordinates: 47°8′6″N 10°13′26″E

Geography
- Location within Austria
- Location: Tyrol, Austria
- Parent range: Lechtal Alps

Galzig is a mountain in the Lechtal Alps of Tyrol, Austria. The elevation at its peak is 2,184 metres (7,165 ft). Located near St. Anton am Arlberg, it is a popular hiking and skiing destination, depending on the season.
