= Dawinkopf =

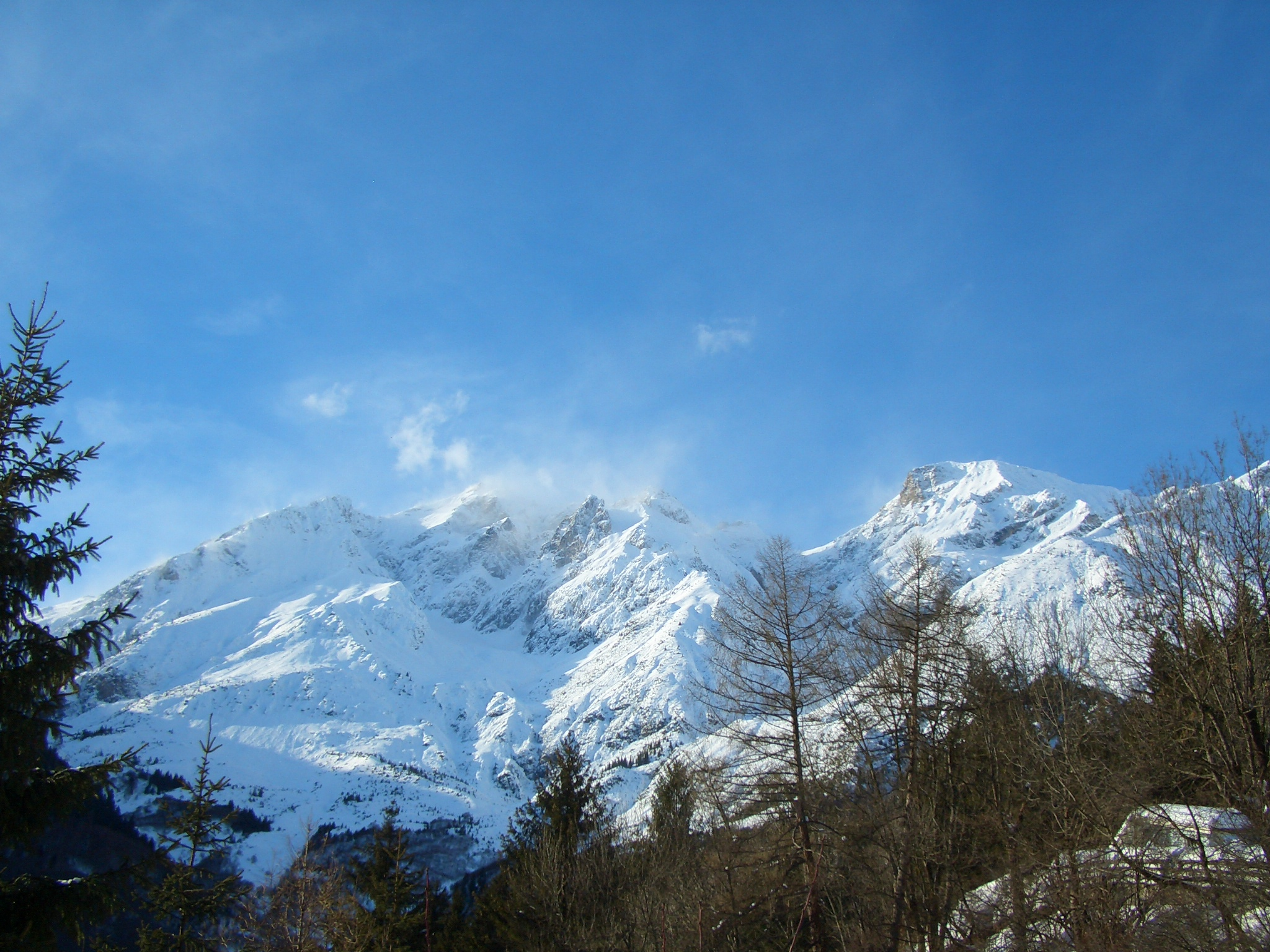

Highest point
- Elevation: 2,968 m (9,738 ft)
- Parent peak: Parseierspitze (line parent)
- Isolation: 0.84 km (0.52 mi) to Parseierspitze
- Coordinates: 47°10′0″N 10°28′0″E

Geography
- Location within Austria
- Location: Tyrol, Austria
- Parent range: Lechtal Alps

Dawinkopf is a subpeak of Parseierspitze in Tyrol, Austria. At an elevation of 2,968 metres (9,738 ft), it is the second-highest summit of the Lechtal Alps and the third highest in the Northern Limestone Alps.
