= Saumspitze =

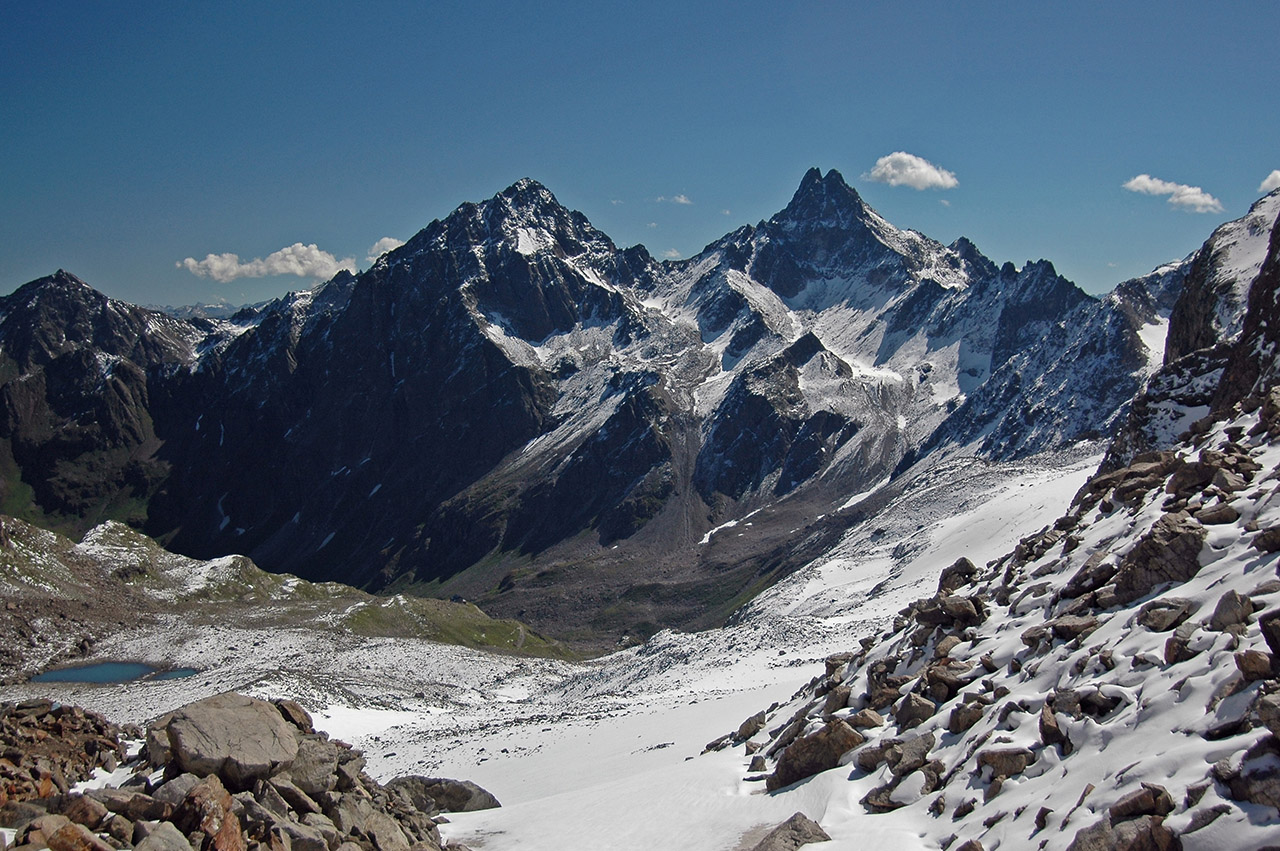
- Saumspitze (left) and Seespitz (right)

Highest point
- Elevation: 3,039 m (9,970 ft)
- Prominence: 198 m (650 ft)
- Isolation: 0.7 km (0.43 mi) to Seeköpfe
- Coordinates: 47°03′03″N 10°16′12″E

Geography
- Location within Alps
- Location: Tyrol, Austria
- Parent range: Verwall Alps

Climbing
- Normal route: UIAA grade I

The Saumspitze is a 3,039 m (AA) mountain in the Verwall Alps, a mountain range of the Central Eastern Alps. It is situated in the West of the Austrian state of Tyrol.

The ascent on normal route from the alpine club hut Därmstädter Hütte at 2384 m to the summit takes approximately two hours and difficulty grade is I on UIAA climbing scale.
