= Parseierspitze =

Mountain in Austria

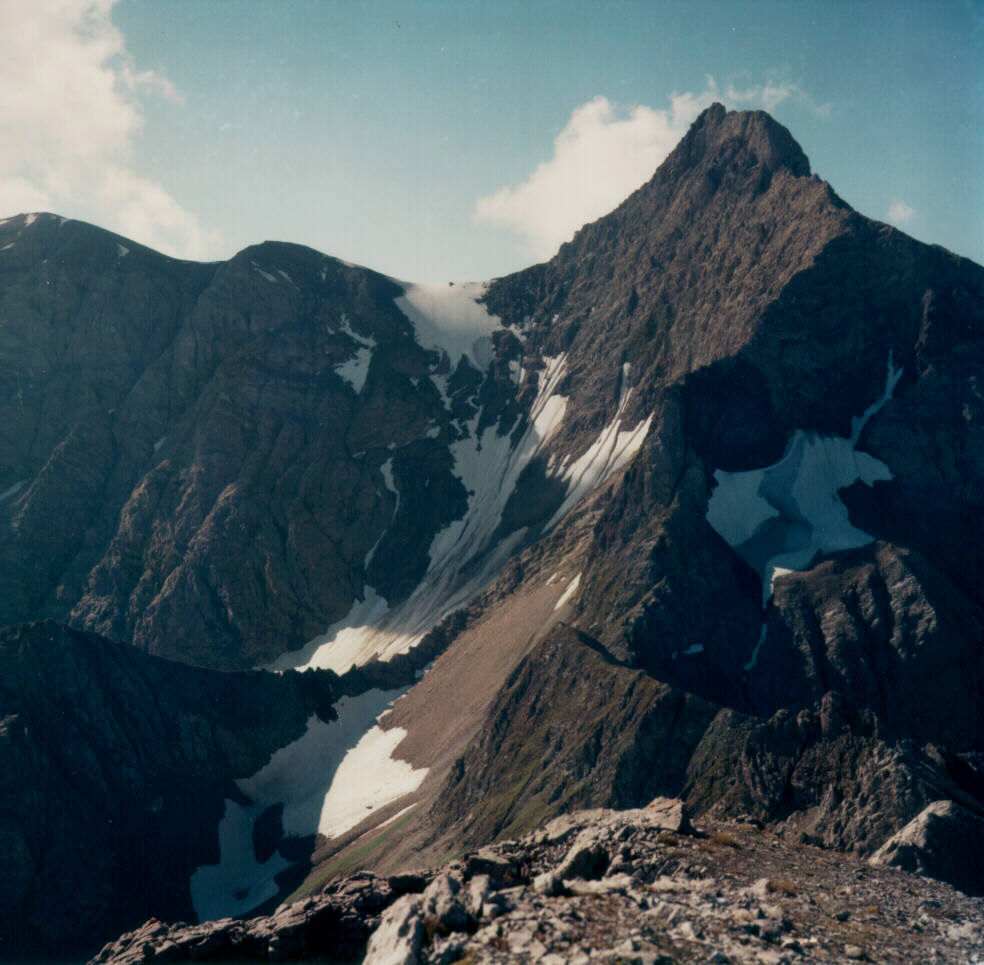
- Parseierspitze

Highest point
- Elevation: 3,036 m (9,961 ft)
- Prominence: 1,243 m (4,078 ft)
- Isolation: 10.13 km (6.29 mi) to Hoher Riffler
- Listing: Alpine mountains above 3000 m
- Coordinates: 47°10′28″N 10°28′42″E

Geography
- Location within Alps
- Location: Tyrol, Austria
- Parent range: Lechtal Alps

Climbing
- First ascent: 23 August 1869 by Joseph Anton Specht, Peter Siess

Parseierspitze is, at 3,036 m (9,961 ft) tall, the highest mountain and the only three-thousander of the Northern Limestone Alps. It is the main peak of the Lechtal Alps, located in the Austrian state of Tyrol, northwest of Landeck.

== Geography ==
The summit consists of radiolarite rocks preventing it from eroding. Due to its height, it is called the "Queen of the Lechtal Alps". The first documented attainment of the summit was made in 1869 by the Vienna entrepreneur Joseph Anton Specht (1828–1894) and his guide Peter Siess from Grins.
