= Holzgauer Wetterspitze =

Mountain in Tyrol, Austria

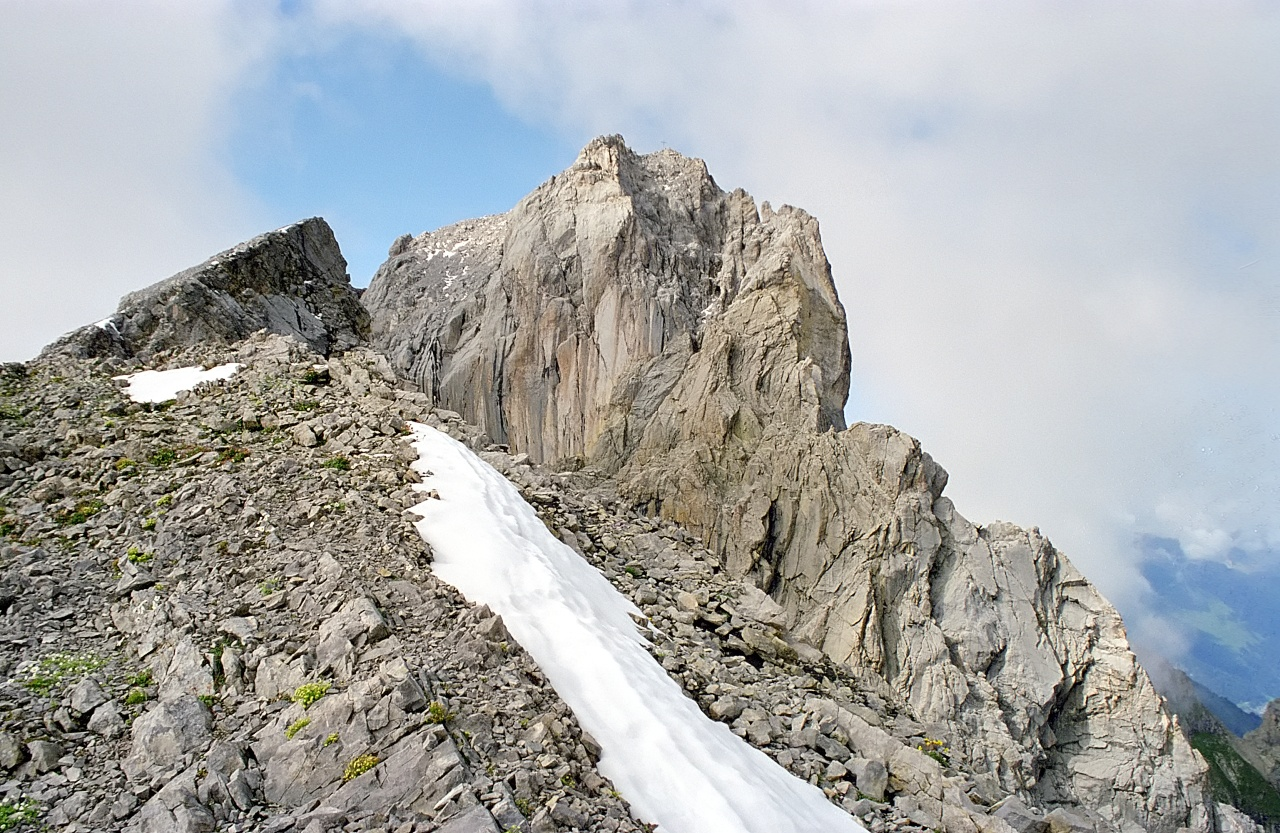
- Holzgauer Wetterspitze

Highest point
- Elevation: 2,895 m (9,498 ft)
- Prominence: 594 m (1,949 ft)
- Isolation: 8.7 km (5.4 mi) to Dawinkopf
- Listing: Alpine mountains 2500-2999 m
- Coordinates: 47°12′23″N 10°22′10″E

Geography
- Location within Alps
- Location: Tyrol, Austria
- Parent range: Lechtal Alps

Holzgauer Wetterspitze is a mountain in the Lechtal Alps of Tyrol, Austria. The elevation at its peak is 2,895 metres (9,498 ft). It is located in the district of Reutte, 7 kilometres (4.3 mi) south of Holzgau, for which its name (meaning "Holzgau weather tip/point") is derived, and 5 kilometres (3.1 mi) east of Kaisers. It is also about 600 metres (2,000 ft) north of the Feuerspitze (2,852 m).

The mountain consists primarily of limestone from the Upper Triassic period.
