= Hahntennjoch =

High mountain pass in the Austrian Alps

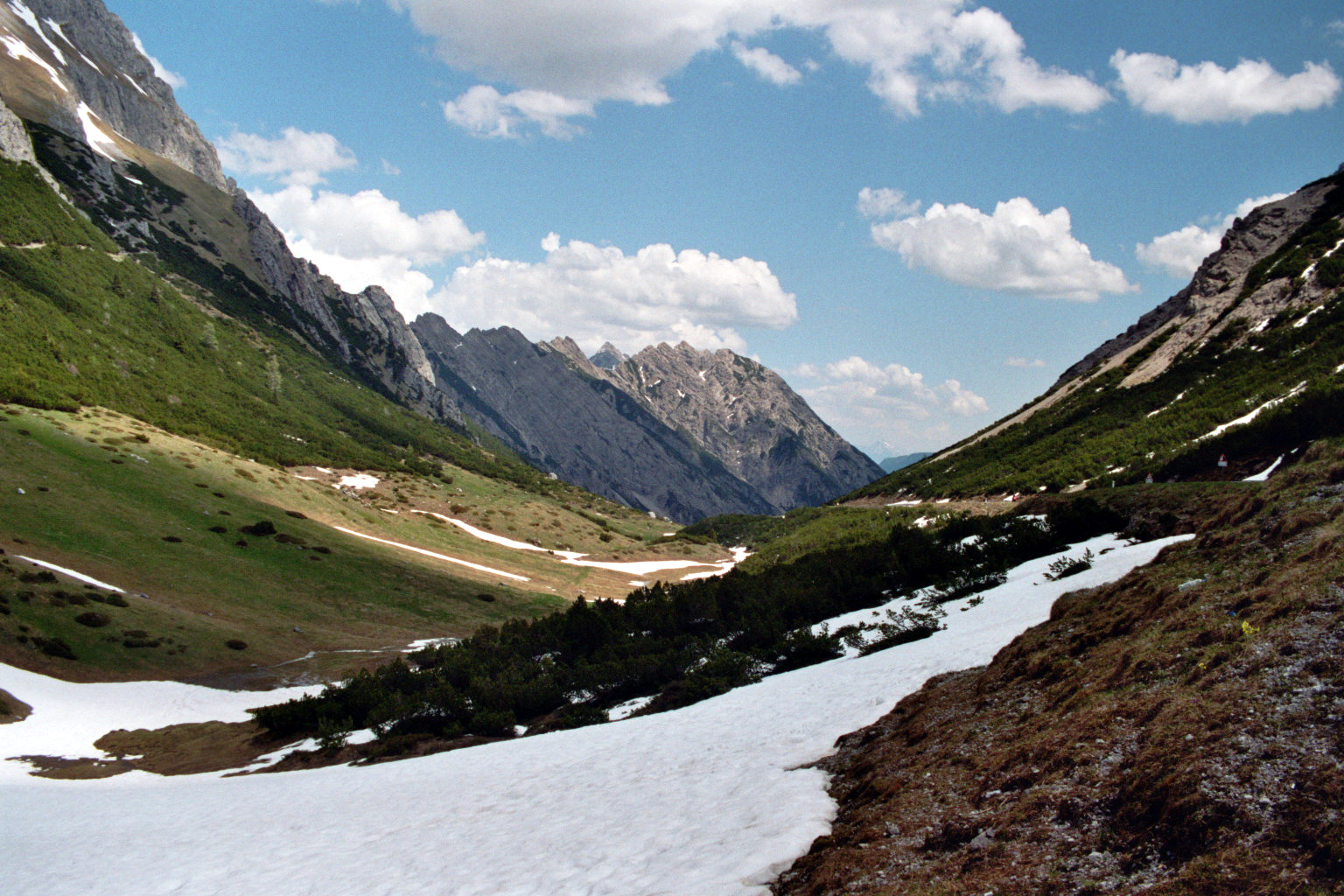
- View from the Hahntennjoch to the east

- Location within Alps
- Elevation: 1,894 metres (6,214 ft)
- Traversed by: L266

Third Approach
- Location: Austria
- Range: Alps
- Coordinates: 47°17′14″N 10°39′00″E

Hahntennjoch (el. 1894 m.) is a high mountain pass in the Austrian Alps in the Bundesland of Tyrol.

It connects the upper valley of the Inn with the Lech valley. The road leads from Imst to Elmen, a distance of 29 km. It is popular with motorcyclists and cyclists.

It is a much shorter route than the Fern Pass or the Flexen Pass over the Arlberg. The road is winding and steep, with grades up to 18.9 percent and is closed to traffic over 14 metric tons. The road is generally closed from November to April.

The pass is prone to avalanches, falling rocks, and mudslides. In 2004, an automatic system was installed that closes the road in case of blockage.

== History ==
The present road was built in the late 1960s and opened in 1969.

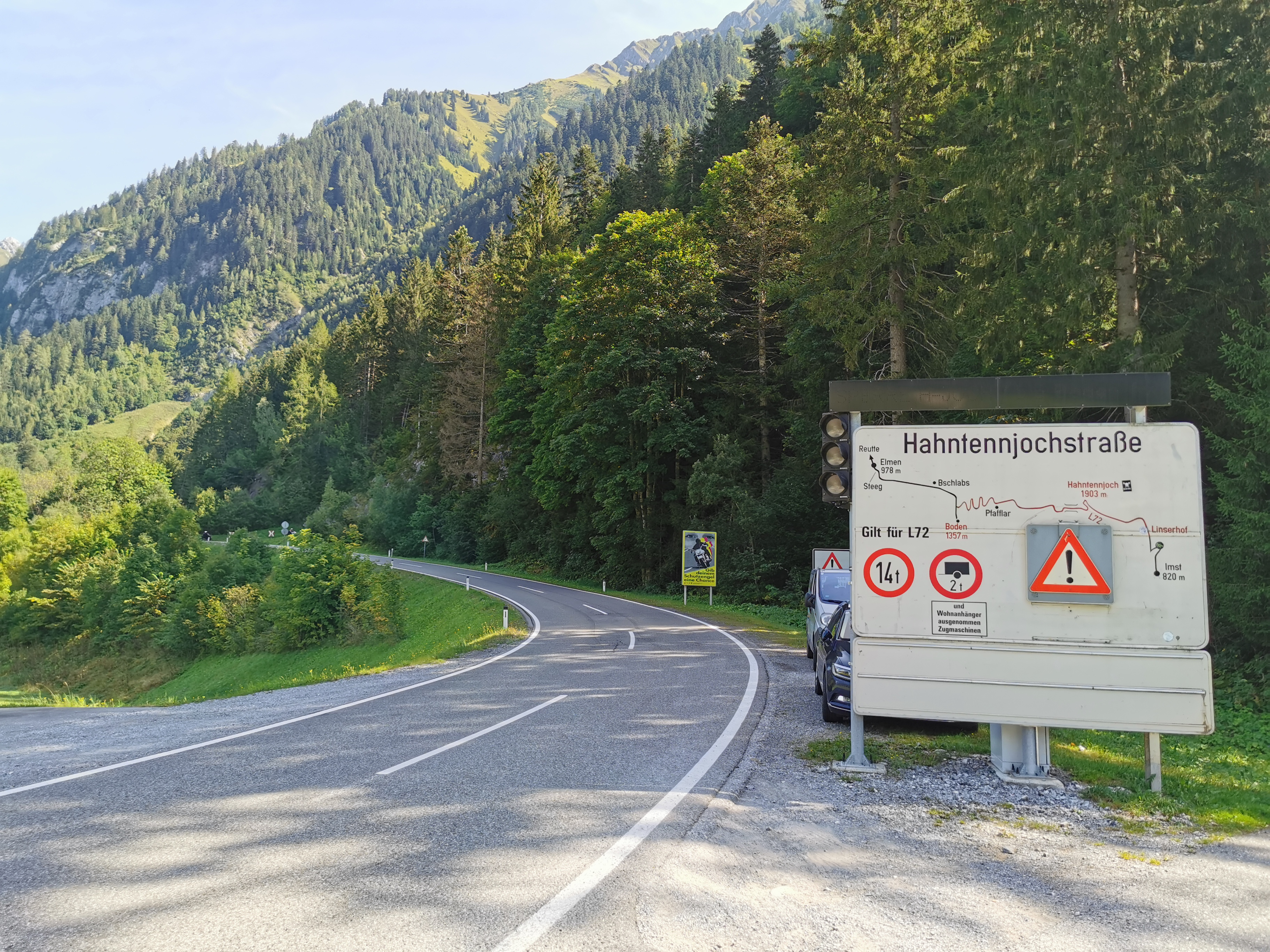
Signs at Hahntennjochstrasse

== See also ==
- List of highest paved roads in Europe
- List of mountain passes
