= Große Schlenkerspitze =

Mountain in Tyrol, Austria

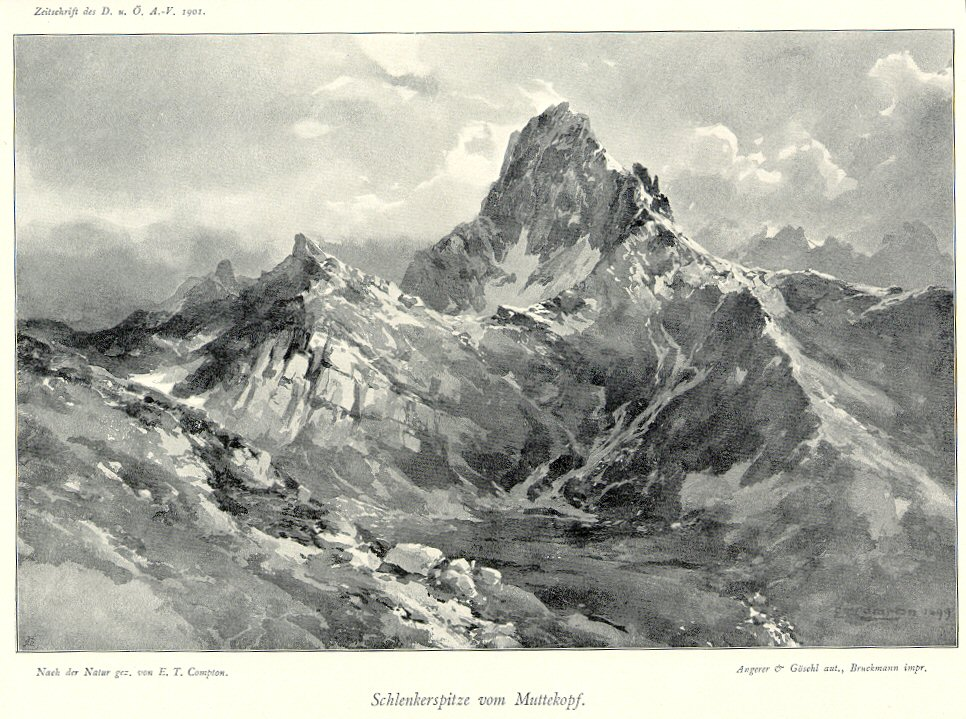
- The Schlenkerspitze from the Muttekopf. Edward Theodore Compton, 1901

Highest point
- Elevation: 2,827 m (AA) (9,275 ft)
- Prominence: 445 m ↓ Gufelgrasjoch
- Isolation: 12.5 km → Gatschkopf
- Listing: Highest peak in the eastern Lechtal Alps
- Coordinates: 47°15′00″N 10°37′00″E

Geography
- Location within Austria
- Location: Tyrol, Austria
- Parent range: Lechtal Alps

Geology
- Rock type: Main dolomite

Climbing
- First ascent: 1882 by Spiehler and Friedel
- Normal route: From Galtseitenjoch, climbing grade II to III

The Große Schlenkerspitze is a mountain in the Lechtal Alps in the Austrian state of Tyrol. At 2,827 m (AA) or, according to other sources, 2,831 m, it is the highest peak in the eastern part of the Lechtal Alps.

== Summit block ==
The massif of the Schlenkerspitze is a rock wall of main dolomite over two kilometres long. Its north arête drops down to the saddle of Galtseitejoch, its southwest arête links the Große Schlenkerspitze to the Kleine Schlenkerspitze (2,748 m above sea level (AA)) and then drops into the Hintere Dremelscharte col. The east arête joins it to the Brunnkarspitze. The entire Schlenker massif is brittle and ruptured, the arêtes bristle with innumerable pinnacles because the rock strata are vertical here.

== First ascent ==
The Große Schlenkerspitze was first ascended in 1882 from the Galtseitenjoch saddle by Spiehler and Friedel; the Kleine Schlenkerspitze via the southeast arête in 1896 by Ampferer and W. Hammer.

== Tours ==
- From Galtseitejoch, 2,423 m, via the north arête, grade II+, 2 hours
- Southeast face, III, 4 hours
- East face, IV+, 3 hours
- West gully and southwest face, described as very difficult to find, grade III, 4 hours, mostly very crumbly.
- Ascents of the Kleine Schlenkerspitze are all difficult, grade III to IV.

== Literature ==
- Heinz Groth, Alpine Club guide Lechtaler Alpen, Bergverlag Rother, Munich
