= Verwall Alps =

Range of the Alps in Tyrol and Vorarlberg, Austria

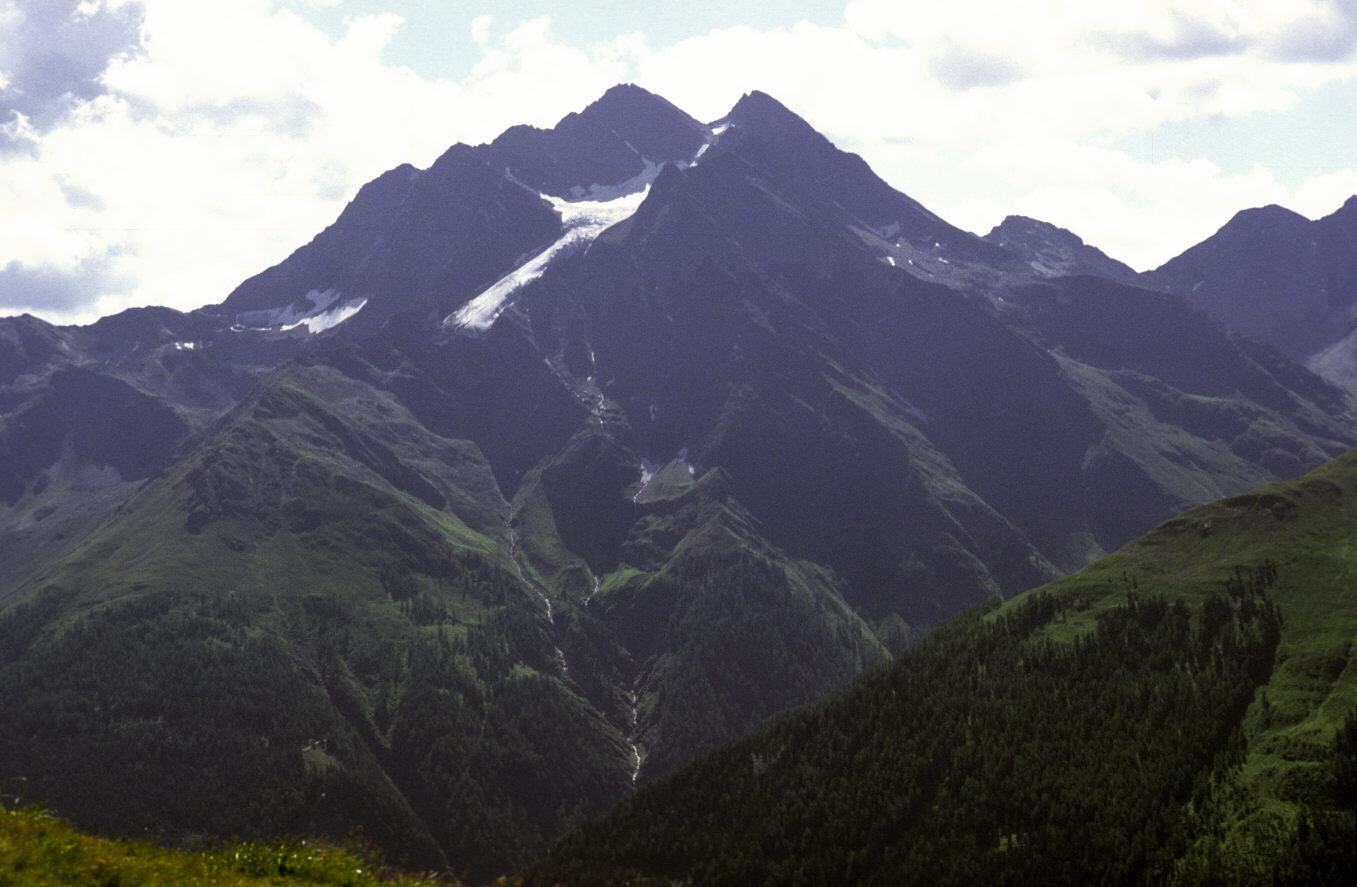
- Hoher Riffler

Highest point
- Peak: Hoher Riffler
- Elevation: 3,168 m (10,394 ft)
- Coordinates: 47°6′58″N 10°22′16″E

Geography
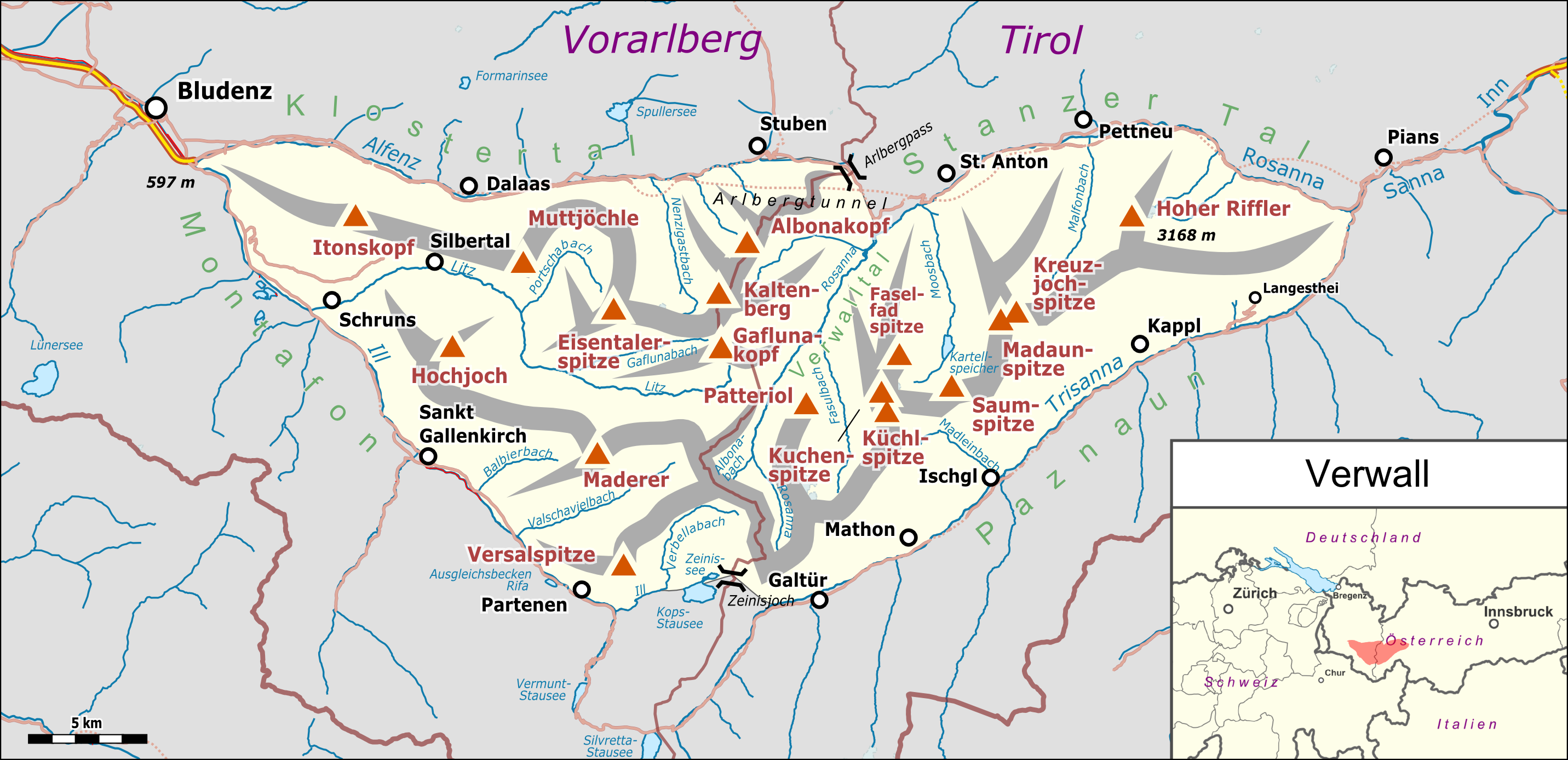
- Verwall Alps; The borders of the range according to Alpine Club classification of the Eastern Alps
- Country: Austria
- States: Vorarlberg; Tyrol
- Parent range: Central Eastern Alps
- Borders on: Samnaun Alps; Silvretta; Rätikon

The Verwall Alps or Verwall Group are a mountain range of the Central Eastern Alps at the border of the Austrian states of Tyrol and Vorarlberg.

It includes the following peaks (sorted by height):

- Hoher Riffler 3,168 metres (10,394 feet)
- Kuchenspitze 3,148 metres (10,401 feet)
- Küchlspitze 3,147 metres (10,315 feet)
- Seeköpfe 3068 m
- Patteriol 3,059 metres (10,037 feet)
- Saumspitze 3,039 metres (9,970 feet)
- Fatlarspitze 2986 m
- Scheibler 2,978 metres (9,770 feet)
- Karköpfe 2948 m
- Vollandspitze 2928 m
- Pflunspitze 2912 m
- Kaltenberg 2900/2896 m
- Gaisspitze 2,779 metres (9,117 feet)

For a list of passes, see Passes of the Silvretta and Rätikon Ranges

The Verwall Alps border on the Silvretta Alps in the west and on the Samnaun Alps in the south.
