= Feuerspitze =

Mountain in Tyrol, Austria

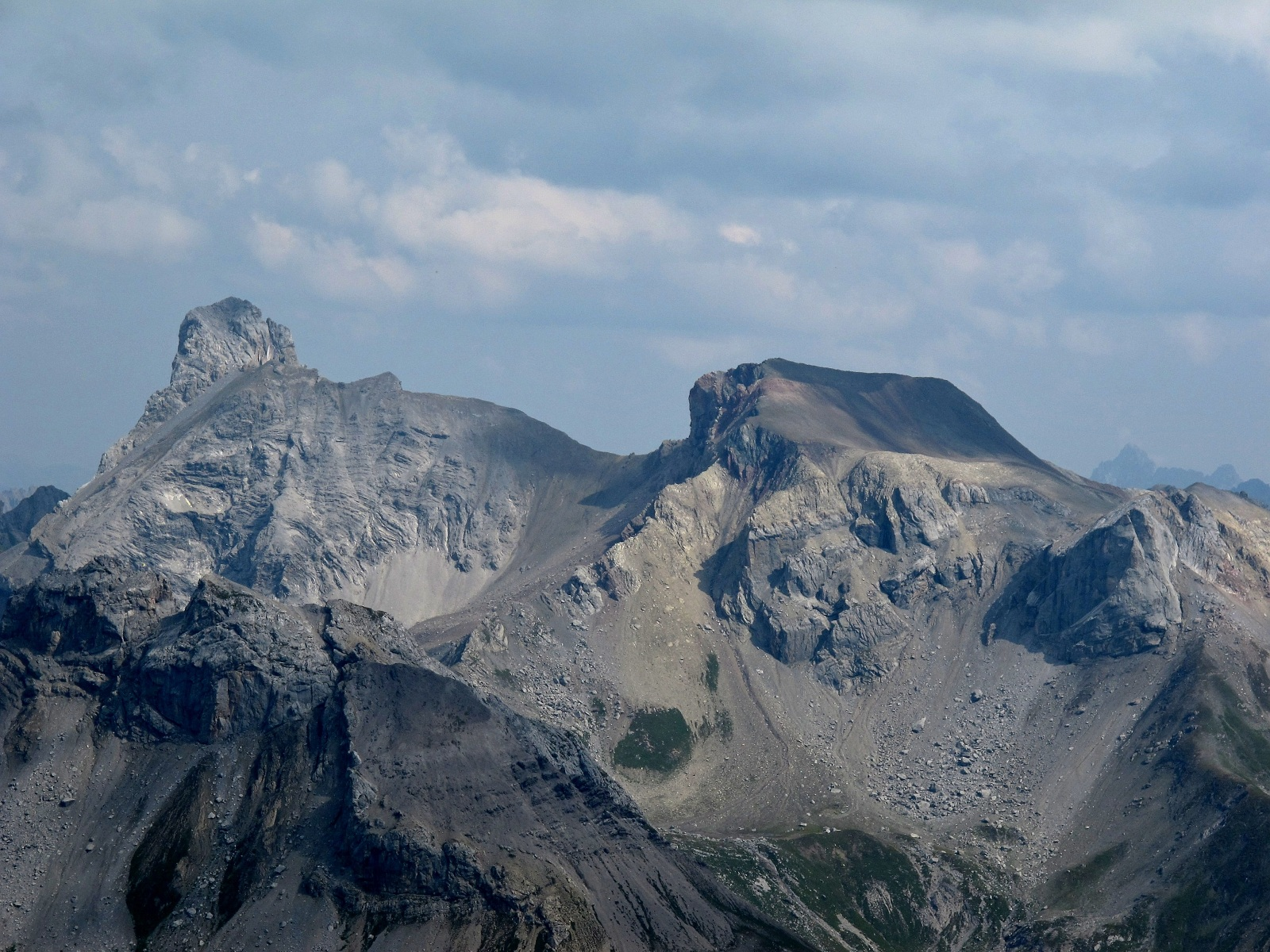
- Wetterspitze (left) and Feuerspitze (right), seen from the southwest

Highest point
- Elevation: 2,852 m (9,357 ft)
- Isolation: 0.66 km (0.41 mi) to Holzgauer Wetterspitze
- Coordinates: 47°12′0″N 10°22′0″E

Geography
- Location within Austria
- Location: Tyrol, Austria
- Parent range: Lechtal Alps

Feuerspitze ("Fire-Peak") is a mountain in the Lechtal Alps of Tyrol. The elevation at its peak is 2,852 metres (9,357 ft). Feuerspitze is located 7 kilometres (4.3 mi) southeast of Holzgau.

From the Ansbacher Hütte, it takes three hours to climb to the summit of Feuerspitze.
