= Lechtal Alps =

Mountain range in Austria

- German: Lechtaler Alpen
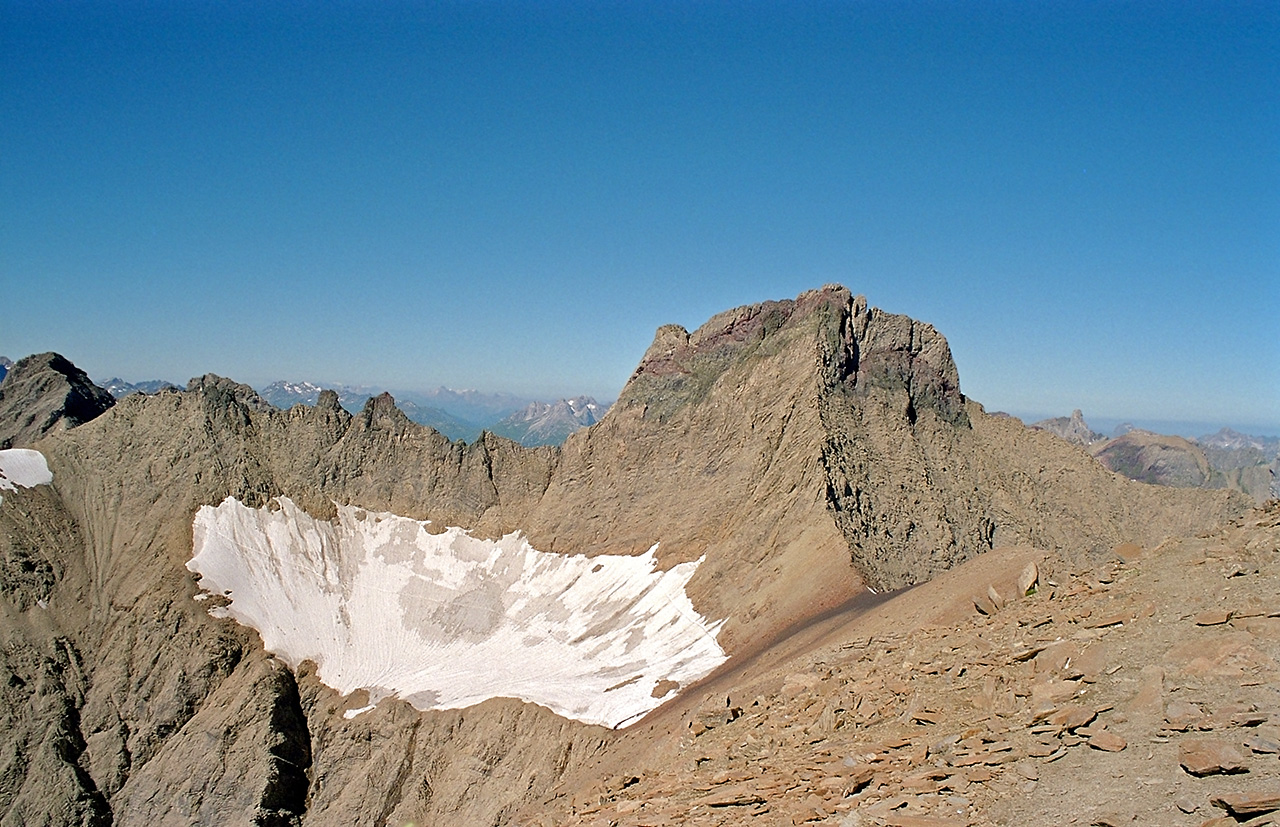
- Parseierspitze with Grinner Glacier

Highest point
- Peak: Parseierspitze
- Elevation: 3,036 m (9,961 ft)
- Coordinates: 47°10′28″N 10°28′42″E

Geography
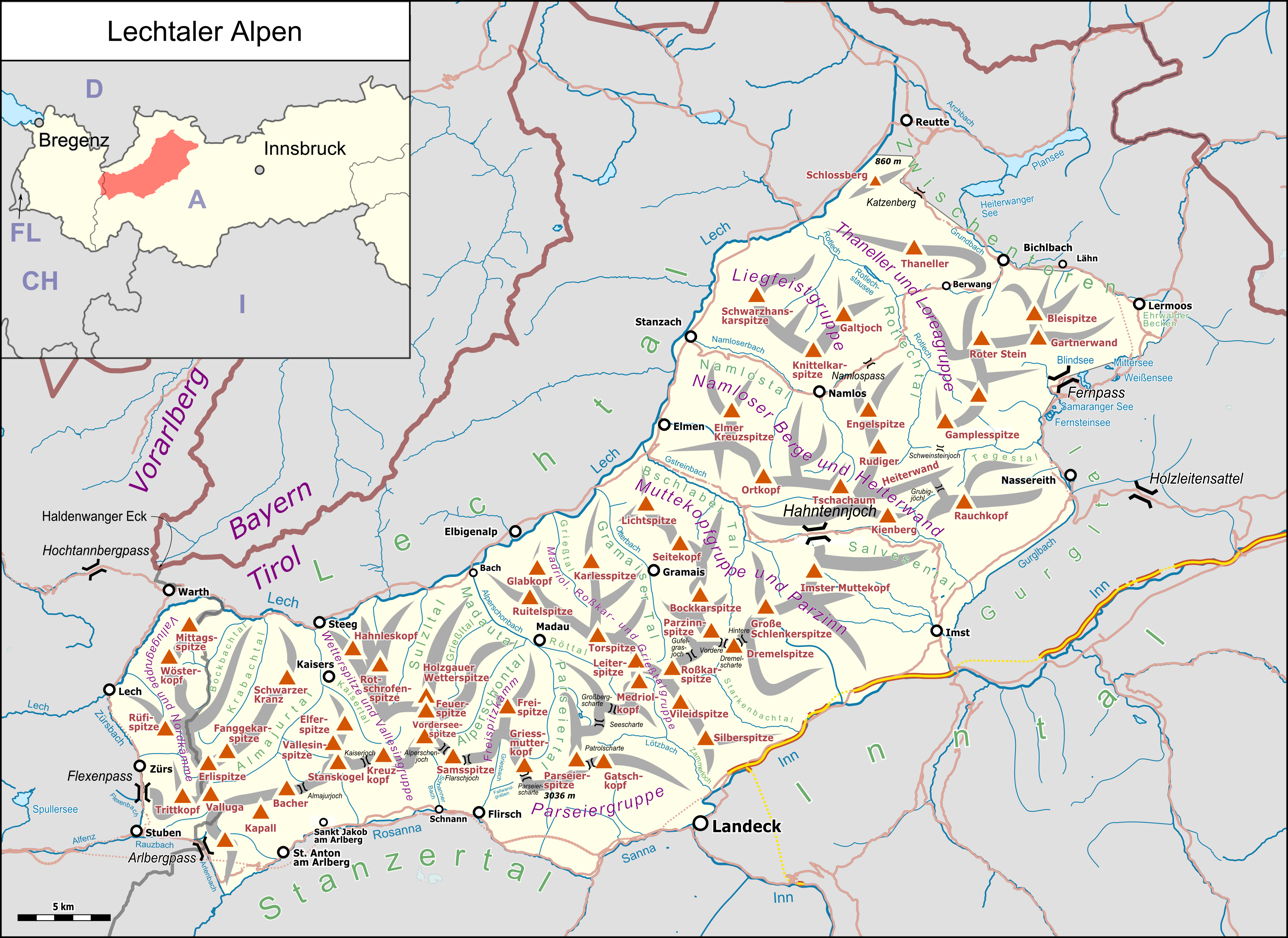
- Lechtal Alps; The borders of the range according to Alpine Club classification of the Eastern Alps
- Country: Austria
- States: Tyrol and Vorarlberg
- Parent range: Northern Limestone Alps
- Borders on: Allgäu Alps and Ammergau Alps

The Lechtal Alps (German: Lechtaler Alpen) are a mountain-range in western Austria, and part of the greater Northern Limestone Alps range. Named for the river Lech which drains them north-ward into Germany, the Lechtal Alps occupy the Austrian states of Tyrol and Vorarlberg and are known for their diverse rock structures.

The Lechtal Alps are surrounded by the Ötztal Alps, Samnaun Alps and Verwall Alps (south) and the Allgäu Alps (north).

== Peaks ==
- Parseierspitze, 3,040 metres (9,970 ft)
- Dawinkopf, 2,970 metres (9,740 ft)
- Südlicher Schwarzer Kopf, 2,949 metres (9,675 ft)
- Gatschkopf, 2,947 metres (9,669 ft)
- Bocksgartenspitze, 2,939 metres (9,642 ft)
- Holzgauer Wetterspitze, 2,898 metres (9,508 ft)
- Oberer Bocksgartenkopf, 2,888 metres (9,475 ft)
- Vorderseespitze, 2,888 metres (9,475 ft)
- Freispitze, 2,887 metres (9,472 ft)
- Eisenspitze, 2,859 metres (9,380 ft)
- Große Schlenkerspitze, 2,827 metres (9,275 ft)
- Imster Muttekopf, 2,774 metres (9,101 ft)
- Fallenbacherspitze, 2,723 metres (8,934 ft)
- Galzig, 2,184 metres (7,165 ft)
