= Hoher Riffler (Verwall Group) =

Mountain in Tyrol, Austria

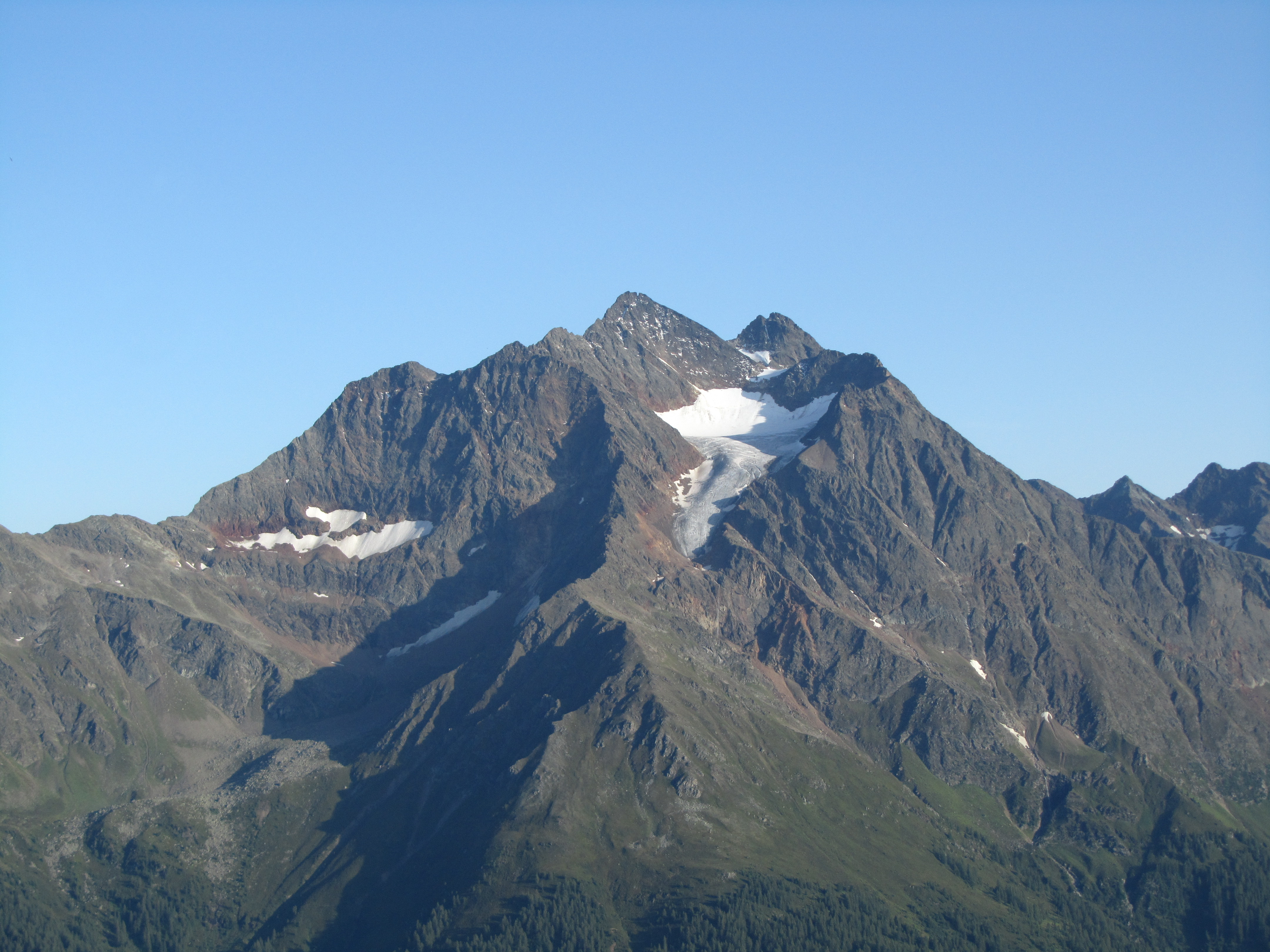

Highest point
- Elevation: 3,167 m (10,390 ft)
- Prominence: 1,329 m (4,360 ft)
- Parent peak: Schattenspitze (line parent)
- Isolation: 23.7 km (14.7 mi)
- Listing: Alpine mountains above 3000 m
- Coordinates: 47°06′58″N 10°22′16″E

Geography
- Location within Alps
- Location: Tyrol, Austria
- Parent range: Verwall Alps

The Hoher Riffler is 3,167 m (AA) high and is the tallest mountain in the Verwall Alps, a mountain range in Central Eastern Alps. It is situated in the West of the Austrian state of Tyrol.

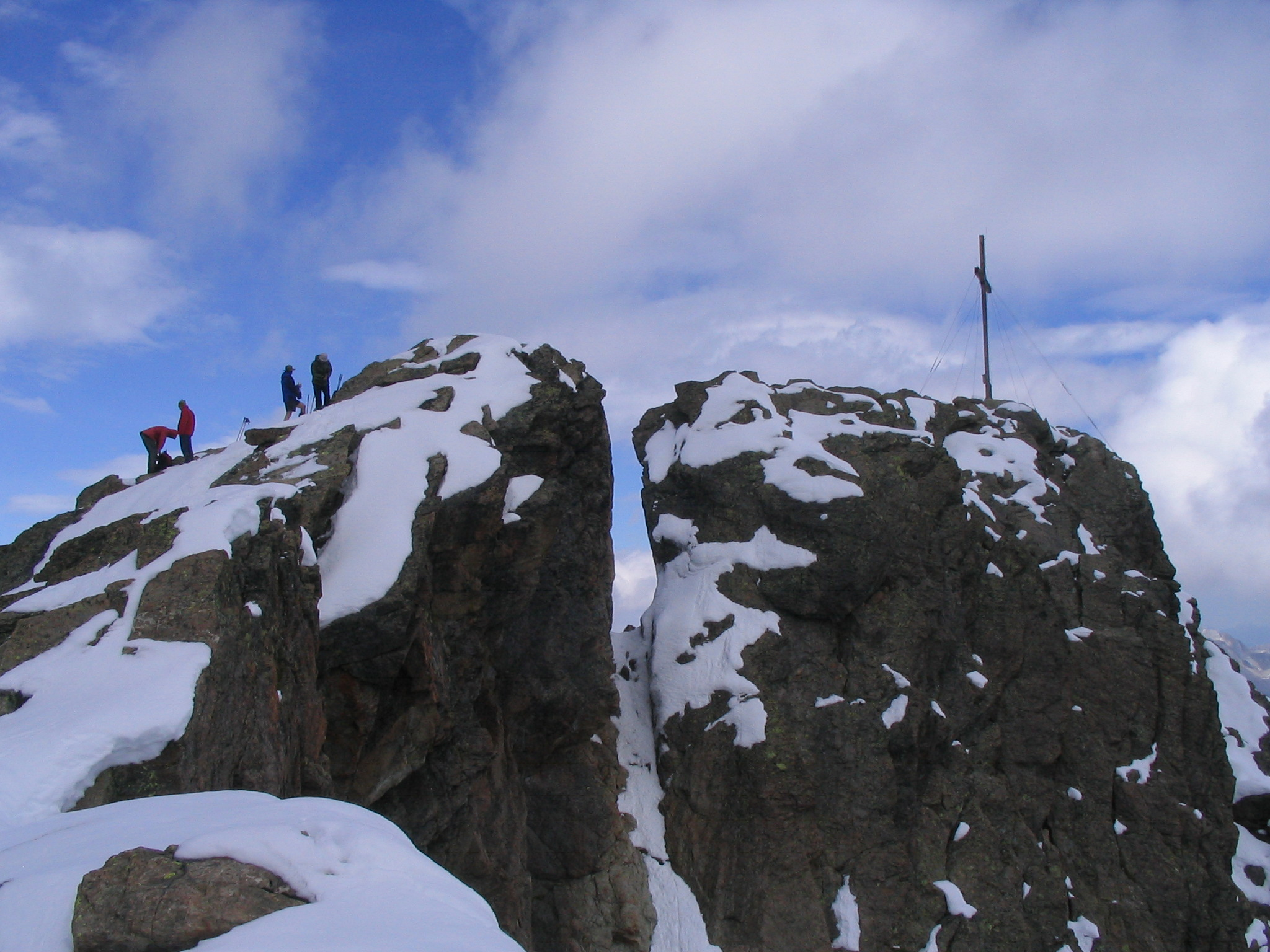
Hoher Riffler has two summits which are separated by a gap (north summit left, south summit with cross right)
