= French Alps =

Portion of the Alps mountain range within France

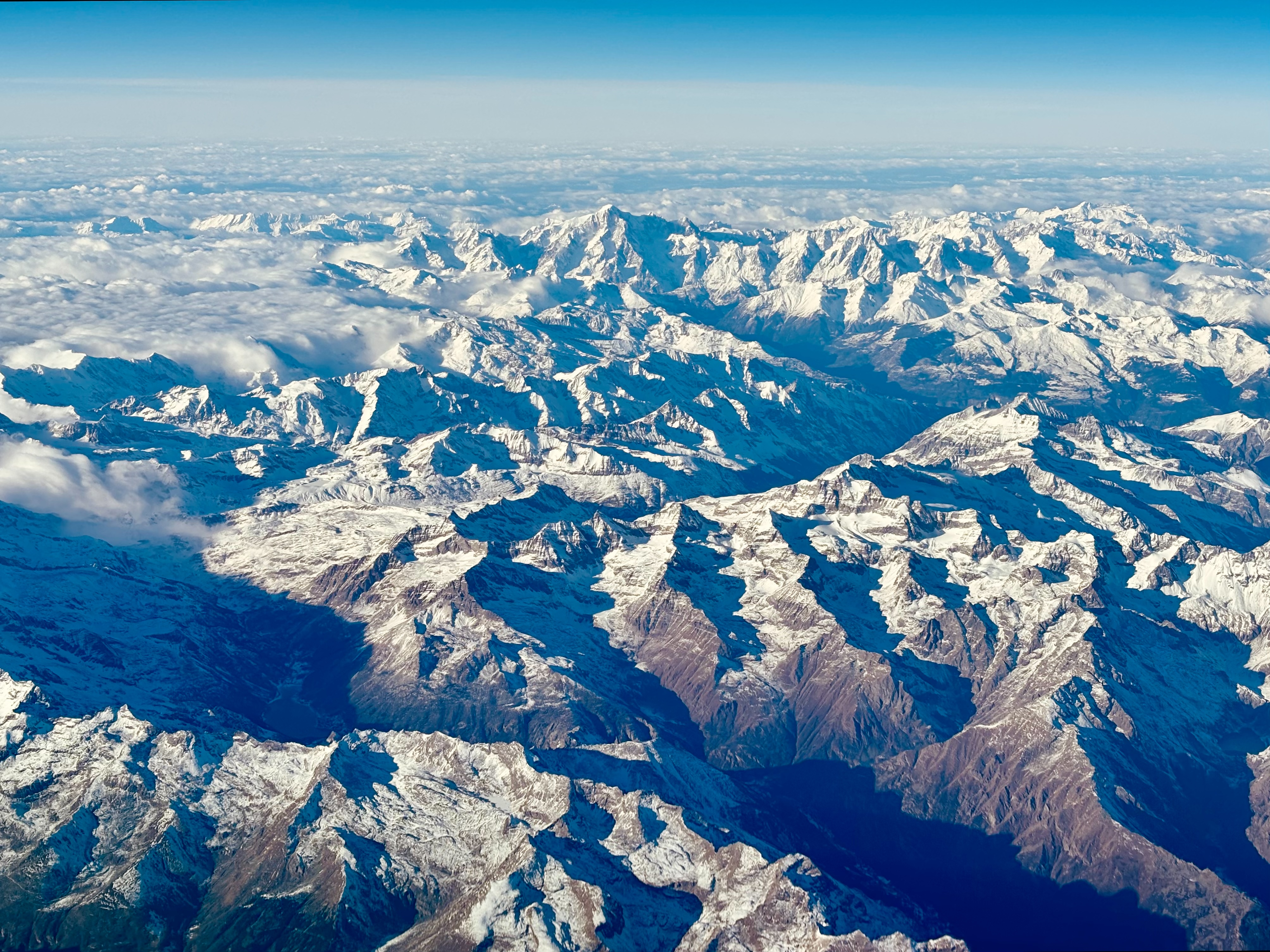
- Aerial photograph of Mont Blanc, the highest mountain in the Alps and Western Europe

Highest point
- Peak: Mont Blanc
- Elevation: 4,807.45 m (15,772.5 ft)
- Coordinates: 45°50′01″N 06°51′54″E

Naming
- Native name: French: Alpes françaises

Geography
- Ranges of the French Alps.
- French regions: Auvergne-Rhône-Alpes; Provence-Alpes-Côte d'Azur
- Borders on: Swiss Alps, Italian Alps

Geology
- Orogeny: Alpine orogeny
- Rock age: Tertiary
- Rock types: Bündner schist; flysch; molasse

The French Alps are the portions of the Alps mountain range that stand within France, located in the Auvergne-Rhône-Alpes and Provence-Alpes-Côte d'Azur regions. While some of the ranges of the French Alps are entirely in France, others, such as the Mont Blanc massif, are shared with Switzerland and Italy.

At 4,808 metres (15,774 ft), Mont Blanc, on the France–Italy border, is the highest mountain in the Alps, and the highest Western European mountain.

Notable towns in the French Alps include Grenoble, Chamonix, Annecy, Chambéry, Évian-les-Bains and Albertville.

The French Alps will host the 2030 Winter Olympics, marking the fourth occasion when the Winter Olympics were held in the region. The games were previously held in Albertville in 1992, Grenoble in 1968, and the very first in Chamonix in 1924.

== Ranges and summits ==
Chain	Range	Highest summit	Elevation (m/ft)
Graian Alps	Mont Blanc Massif	Mont Blanc	4,807.45 metres (15,772 ft)
Graian Alps	Beaufortain Massif	Roignais	2,995 metres (9,826 ft)
Graian Alps	Lauzière Massif	Grand Pic de la Lauzière	2,829 metres (9,281 ft)
Graian Alps	Vanoise Massif	Grande Casse	3,855 metres (12,648 ft)
Graian Alps	Graian Alps central group	Pointe de Charbonnel	3,752 metres (12,310 ft)
Dauphiné Alps	Belledonne Massif	Grand Pic de Belledonne	2,977 metres (9,767 ft)
Dauphiné Alps	Grandes Rousses	Pic Bayle	3,465 metres (11,368 ft)
Dauphiné Alps	Arves Massif	Aiguilles d'Arves	3,514 metres (11,529 ft)
Dauphiné Alps	Taillefer Massif	Le Taillefer	2,857 metres (9,373 ft)
Dauphiné Alps	Écrins Massif	Barre des Écrins	4,102 metres (13,458 ft)
Cottian Alps	Massif du Mont-Cenis	Pointe de Ronce	3,612 metres (11,850 ft)
Cottian Alps	Cerces Massif	Grand Galibier	3,229 metres (10,594 ft)
Cottian Alps	Queyras Massif	Rochebrune Peak	3,320 metres (10,892 ft)
Cottian Alps	Ubaye Massif (Orrenaye)	Aiguille de Chambeyron	3,411 metres (11,191 ft)
Maritime Alps	Mercantour-Argentera Massif	Cime du Gélas	3,143 metres (10,312 ft)
Maritime Alps	Pelat Massif	Mont Pelat	3,050 metres (10,007 ft)
Maritime Alps	Massif des Trois-Évêchés	Tête de l'Estrop	2,961 metres (9,715 ft)
Ligurian Alps	Ligurian Alps	Punta Marguareis	2,651 metres (8,698 ft)
Savoy Prealps	Chablais Alps	Hauts-Forts	2,464 metres (8,084 ft)
Savoy Prealps	Haut-Giffre Massif	Haute Cime	3,257 metres (10,686 ft)
Savoy Prealps	Aiguilles Rouges	Aiguille du Belvédère	2,965 metres (9,728 ft)
Savoy Prealps	Bornes	Pointe Blanche	2,438 metres (7,999 ft)
Savoy Prealps	Aravis Range	Pointe Percée	2,750 metres (9,022 ft)
Savoy Prealps	Bauges	Arcalod	2,217 metres (7,274 ft)
Savoy Prealps	Chartreuse Mountains	Chamechaude	2,082 metres (6,831 ft)
Dauphiné Prealps	Vercors Massif	Grand Veymont	2,341 metres (7,680 ft)
Dauphiné Prealps	Diois Mountains	Mont Jocou	2,051 metres (6,729 ft)
Dauphiné Prealps	Dévoluy Mountains	Grande Tête de l'Obiou	2,789 metres (9,150 ft)
Provence Prealps	Bochaine	Mont Céüse	2,016 metres (6,614 ft)
Provence Prealps	Digne Prealps	Les Monges	2,115 metres (6,939 ft)
Provence Prealps	Baronnies	Mont Mare	1,603 metres (5,259 ft)
Provence Prealps	Vaucluse Mountains	Signal de Saint-Pierre	1,256 metres (4,121 ft)
Provence Prealps	Luberon Mountains	Mourre Nègre	1,125 metres (3,691 ft)
Maritime Prealps	Castellan Prealps	Puy de Rent	1,996 metres (6,549 ft)
Maritime Prealps	Nice Prealps	Pointe des Trois Communes	2,080 metres (6,824 ft)

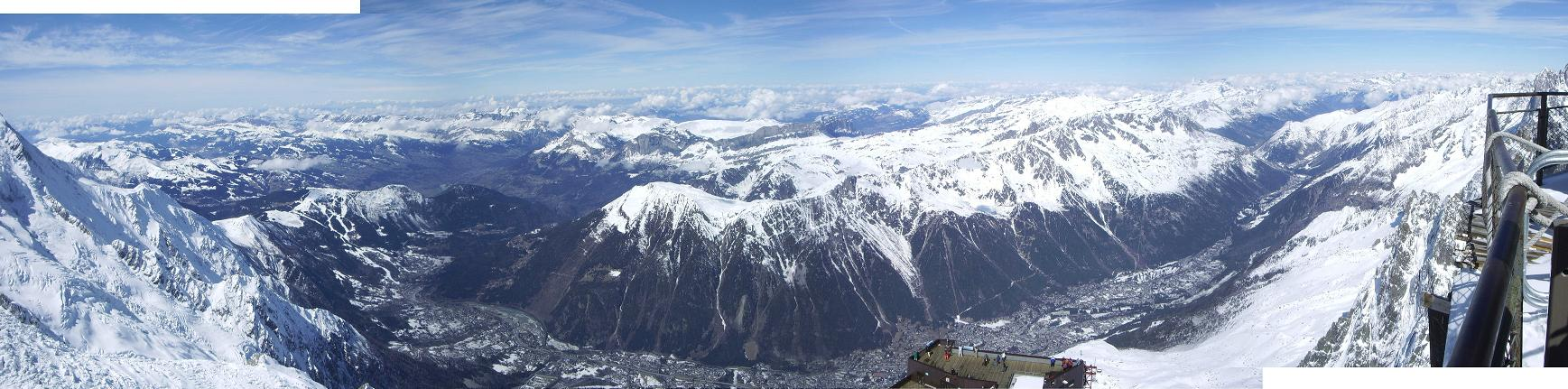
Panorama of Chamonix Valley

== Ski areas ==
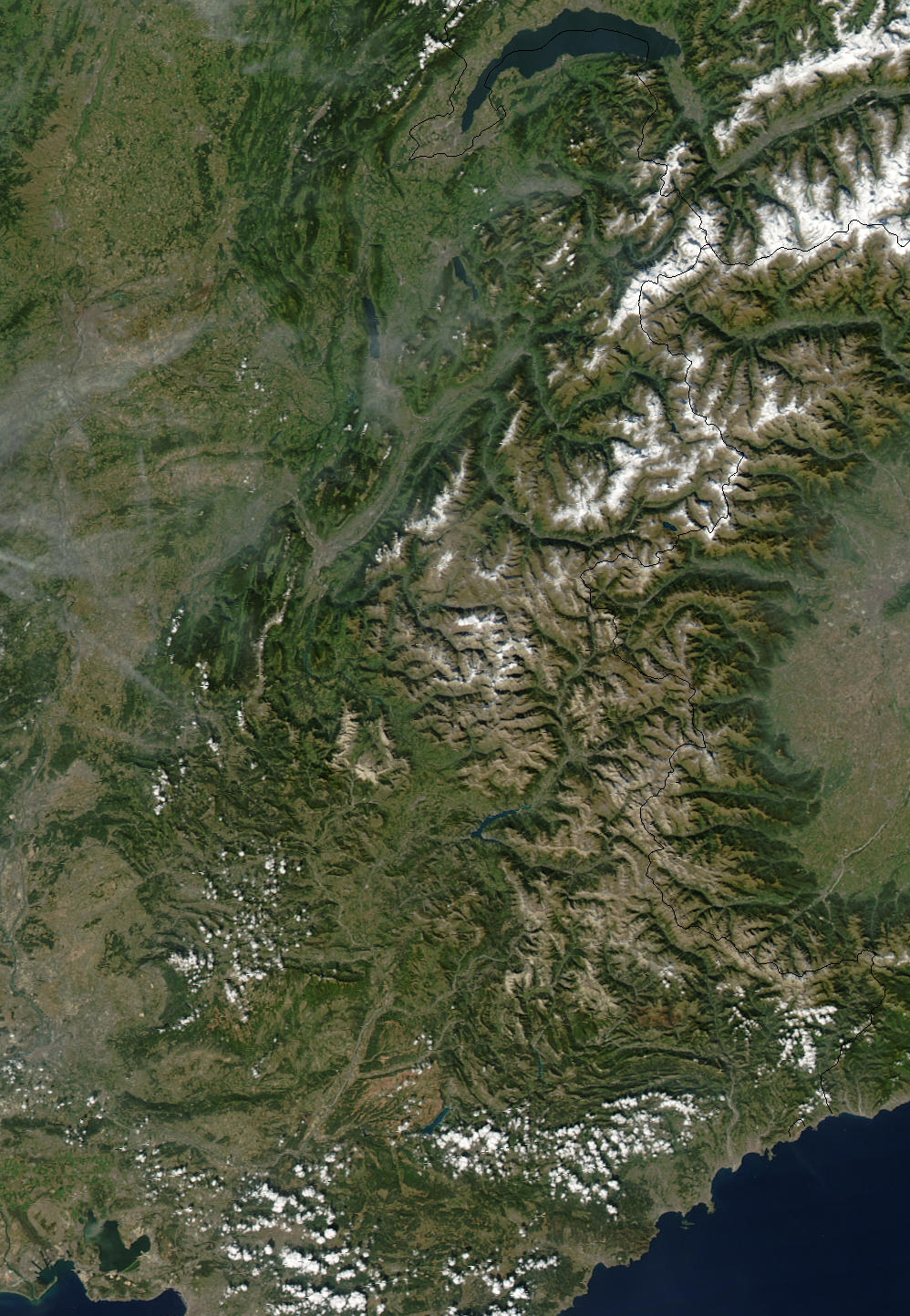
NASA photograph of the French Alps (26 October 2002).

The largest connected ski areas are:

1. Les Trois Vallées (Courchevel, Méribel, La Tania, Brides-les-Bains, Saint-Martin-de-Belleville, Les Menuires, Val Thorens and Orelle): 338 slopes, 600 km of pistes.
2. Portes du Soleil (Avoriaz, Châtel, Morzine, Les Gets, Saint-Jean d'Aulps, La Chapelle d'Abondance, Abondance, Montriond, Swiss resorts): 288 slopes, 650 km of slopes not entirely connected.
3. Paradiski (La Plagne, Peisey-Vallandry, Les Arcs), Champagny-en-Vanoise: 239 slopes, 420 km of slopes.
4. Via Lattea (Montgenèvre, Italian resorts): 214 slopes, 400 km of slopes.
5. Évasion Mont-Blanc (Combloux, Megève, Saint-Gervais, Saint-Nicolas-de-Véroce, Les Contamines Monjoie): 183 slopes, 420 km of slopes not entirely connected.
6. Espace Killy (Tignes, Val-d'Isère): 137 slopes, 300 km of slopes.
7. Grand Massif (Flaine, Les Carroz, Morillon, Samoëns, Sixt): 134 slopes, 265 km of slopes.
8. Les Aravis (La Clusaz, Manigod, La Croix Fry, Merdassier, Le Grand-Bornand): 133 slopes, 220 km of slopes not entirely connected.
9. Les Grandes Rousses (L'Alpe d'Huez, Vaujany, Auris-en-Oisans, Oz-en-Oisans, Villard-Reculas): 117 slopes, 236 km of slopes.
10. Serre Chevalier: 111 slopes, 250 km of slopes.
11. La Forêt Blanche (Risoul, Vars): 104 slopes, 180 km of slopes.
12. Les Sybelles (Le Corbier, La Toussuire, Les Bottières, Saint-Jean-d'Arves, Saint-Sorlin-d'Arves, Saint-Colomban-des-Villards): 96 slopes, 310 km of slopes.
13. Valloire and Valmeinier: 83 slopes, 150 km of slopes.
14. Grand Domaine (Valmorel, Saint-François-Longchamp): 82 slopes, 150 km of slopes
15. Espace San Bernardo (La Rosière, La Thuile - Italy): 73 slopes, 150 km of slopes.
16. Les Deux Alpes and La Grave: 69 slopes, 220 km of slopes. (+ Freeride Zone)

The other large ski areas are:

- Le Val d'Arly (Praz-sur-Arly, Notre-Dame-de-Bellecombe, Flumet): 150 km of slopes.
- L'Espace Cristal (Les Saisies, Crest-Voland): 80 km of slopes
- L'Espace Diamant is a combination of Espace Val d'Arly and Espace Cristal with 185 km of slopes
- Villard-de-Lans et Corrençon-en-Vercors: 125 km of slopes
- Valberg - Beuil les Launes: 90 km of slopes
- Espace Lumière (Pra-Loup, Val d'Allos): 170 km of slopes
- Superdévoluy - La Joue du Loup: 100 km of slopes
- Orcières-Merlette: 150 km of slopes

== Activities ==
A range of winter and summer activities are available in the French Alps. In the winter, these include skiing and snowboarding; alternative activities include snowshoeing and sledging. There is a range of other activities that happen such as gliding, which is more popular during the summer months. Summer activities include hiking, mountaineering, biking and rock climbing.

== Gallery ==
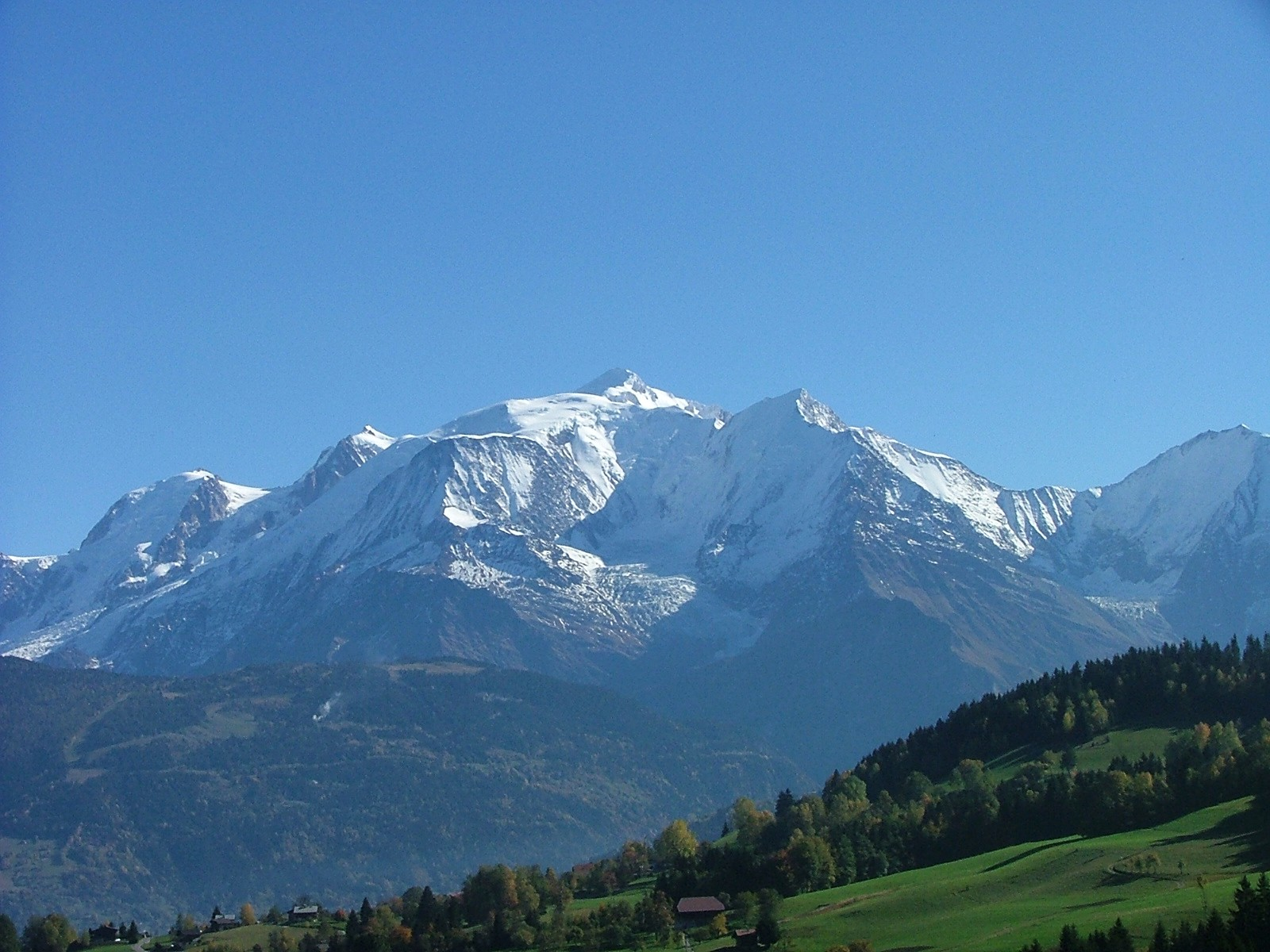
Mont Blanc (4,810 m)

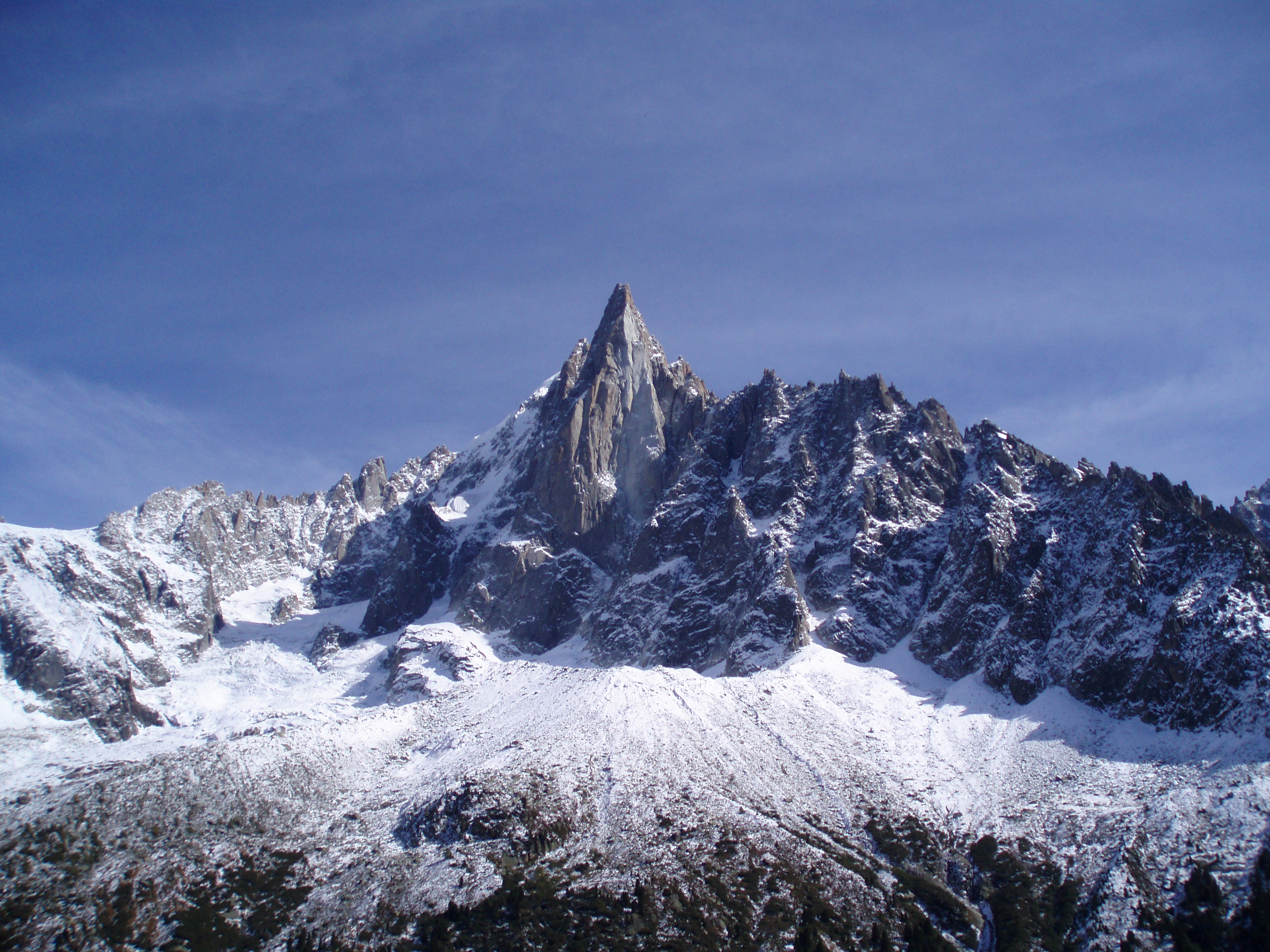
Aiguille du Dru (3,754 m)

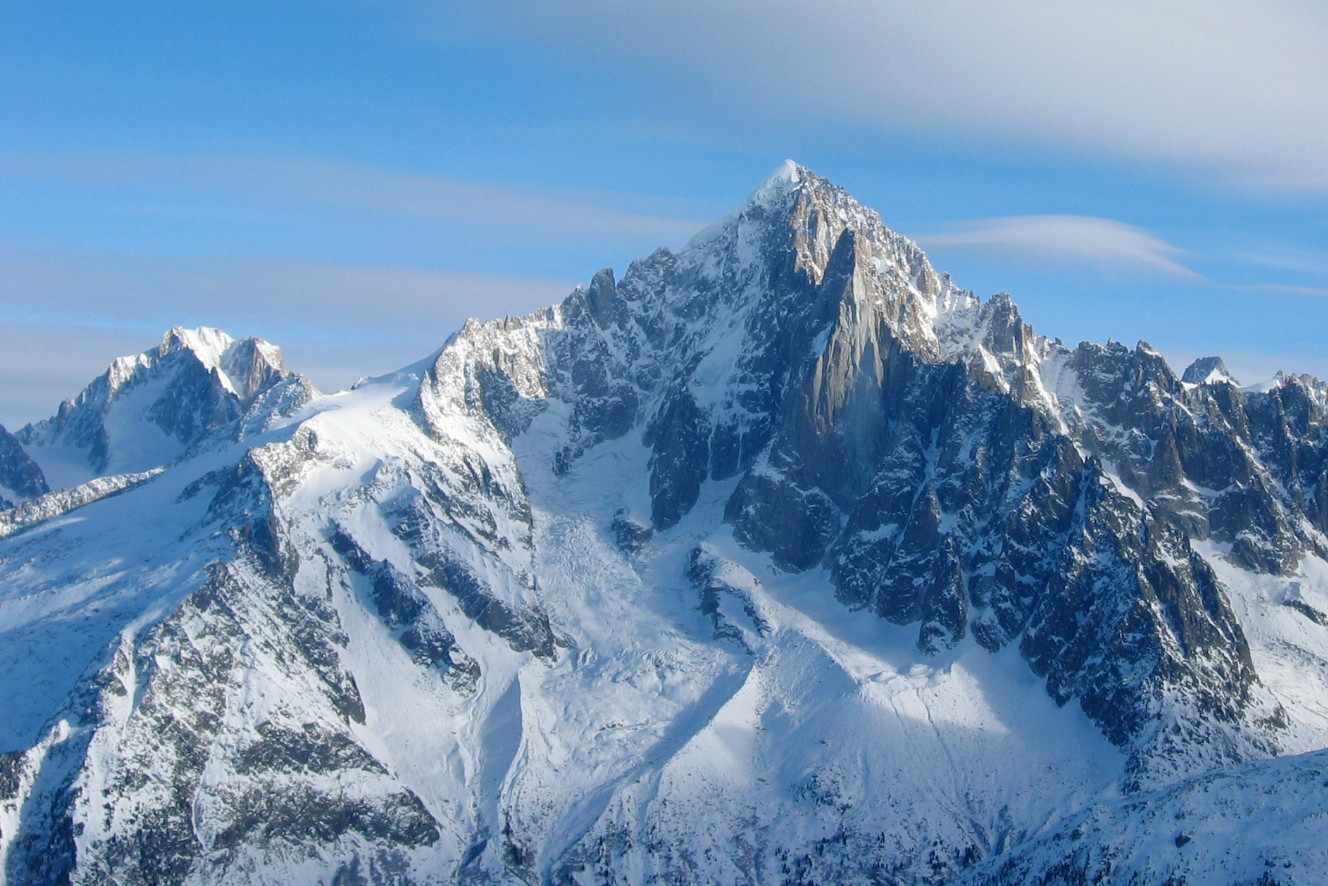
Aiguille Verte (4,122 m)

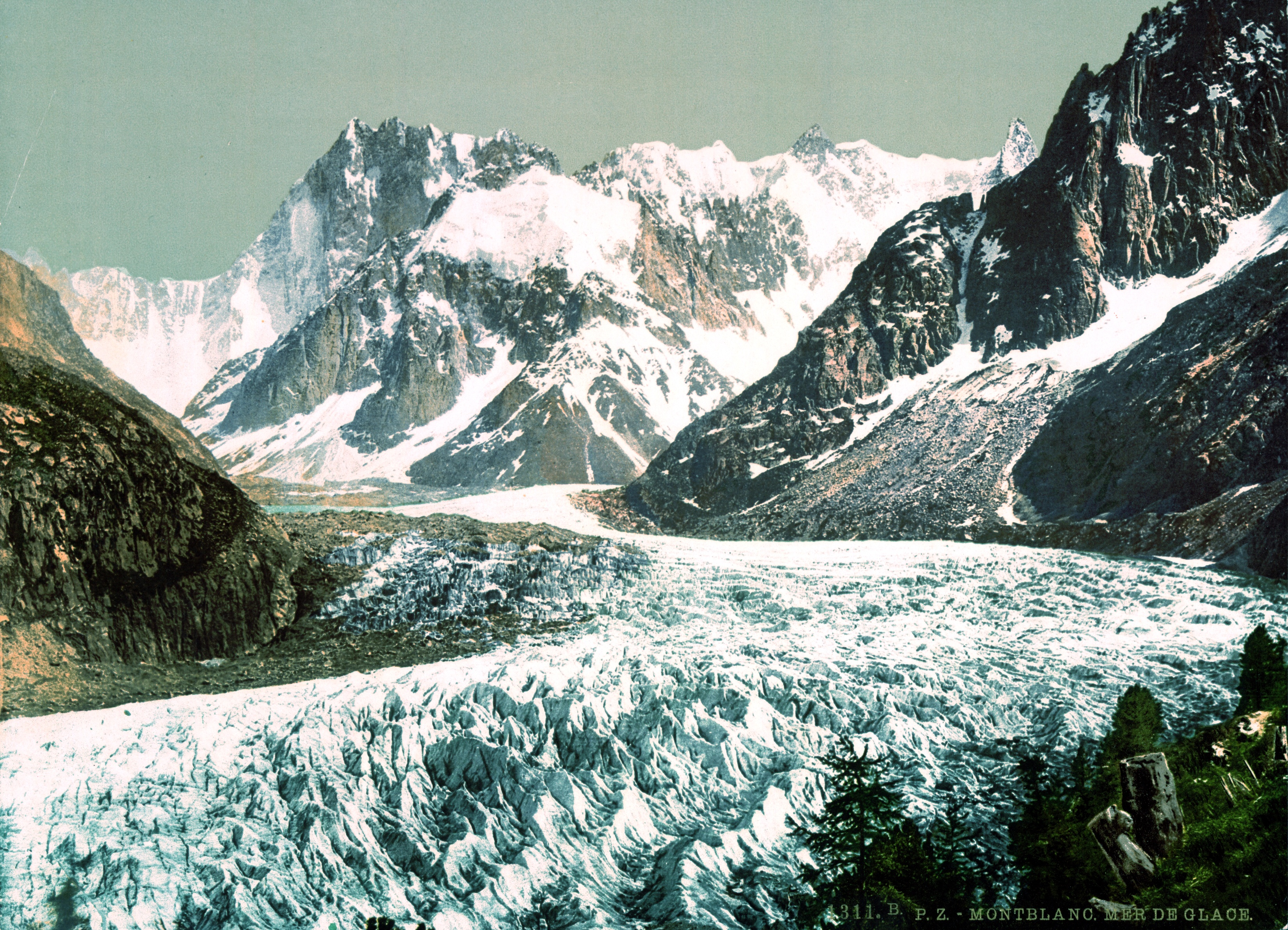
Mer de Glace, Dent du Géant (4,013 m) and Grandes Jorasses (4,208 m) in Chamonix (c. 1890)

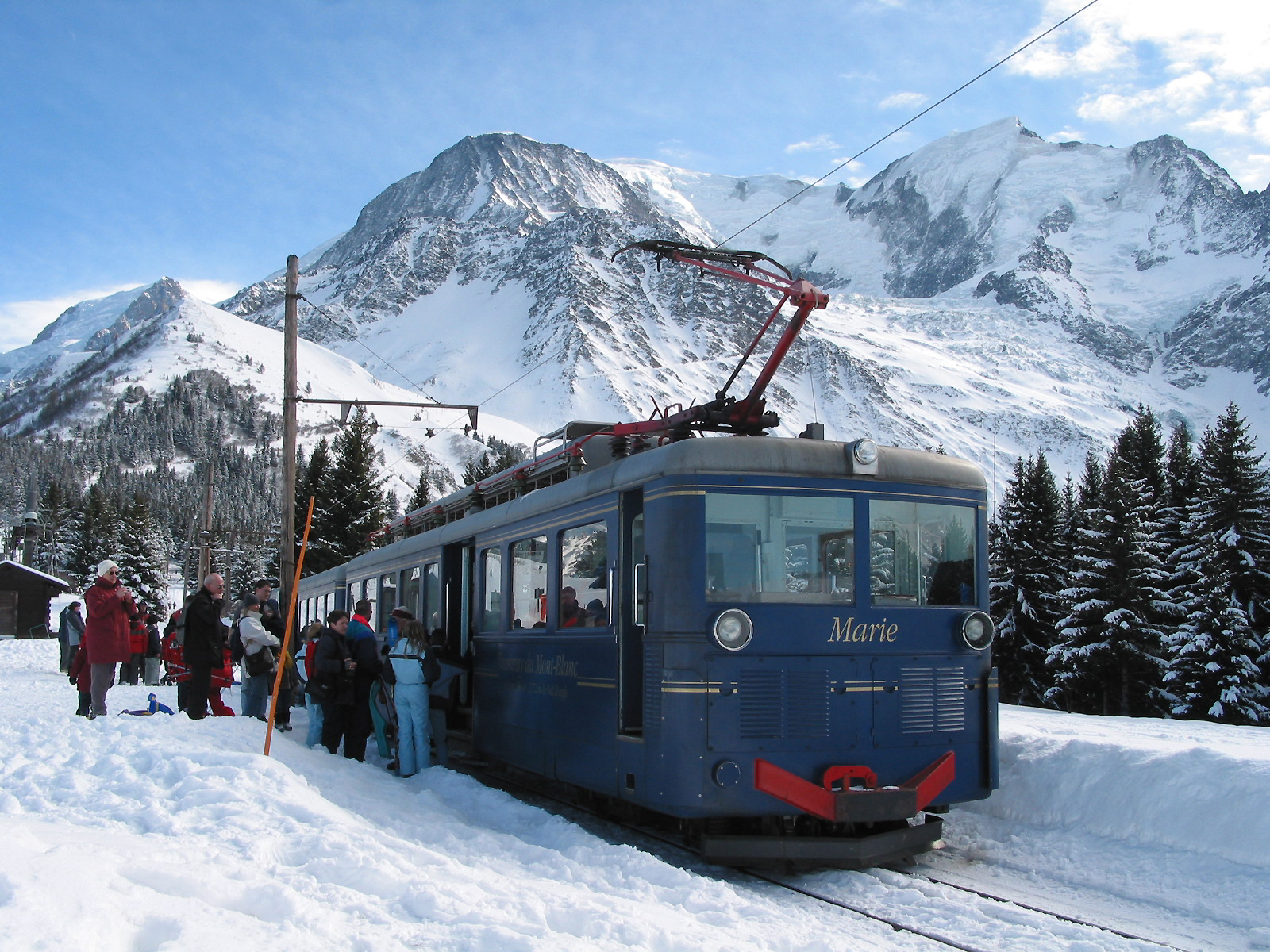
Tramway du Mont-Blanc, at Bellevue Station (1,794 m) in Saint-Gervais-les-Bains

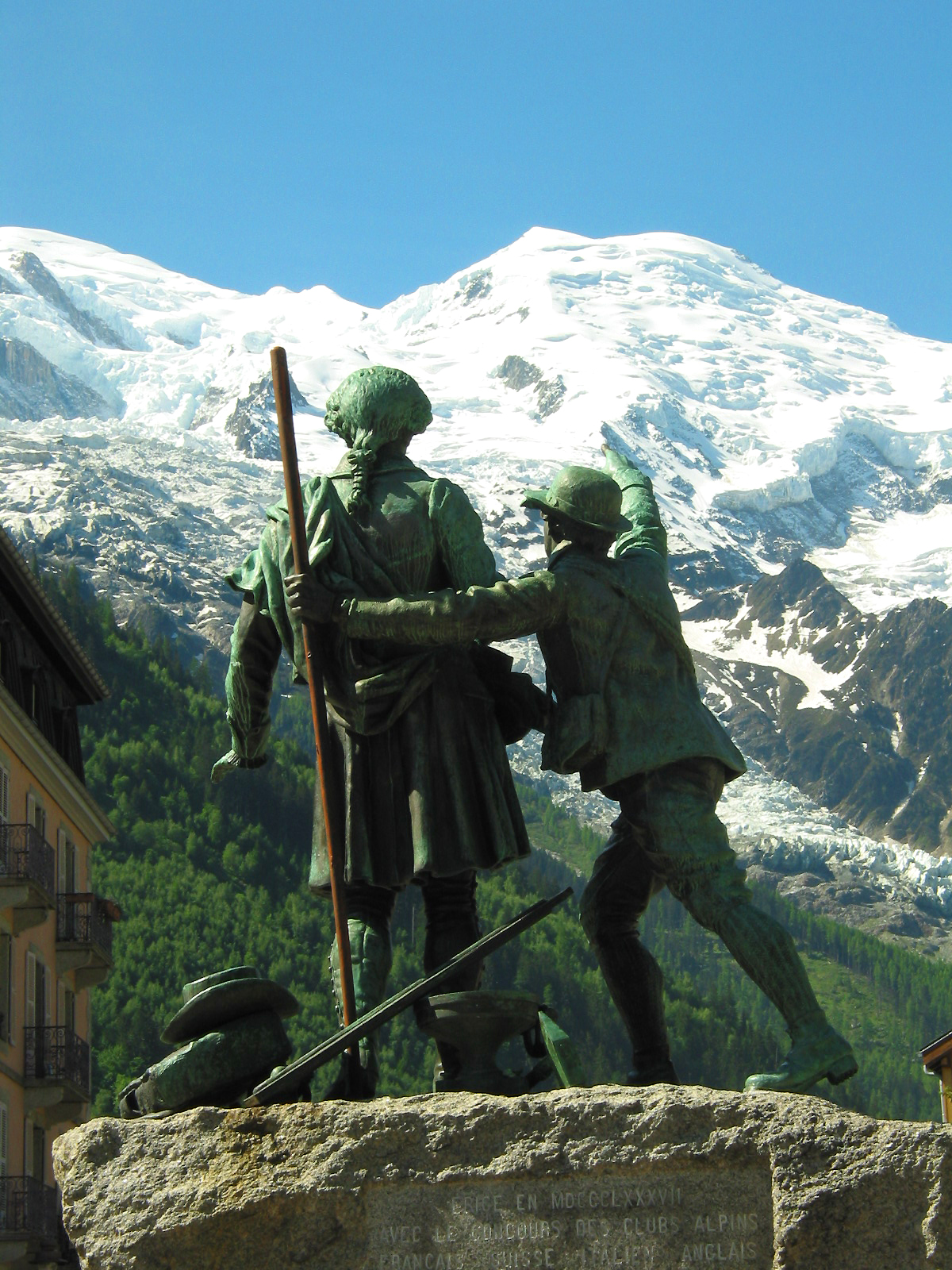
Jacques Balmat at the side of Horace-Benedict de Saussure, "The Father of Alpinism", in a monument erected at Chamonix

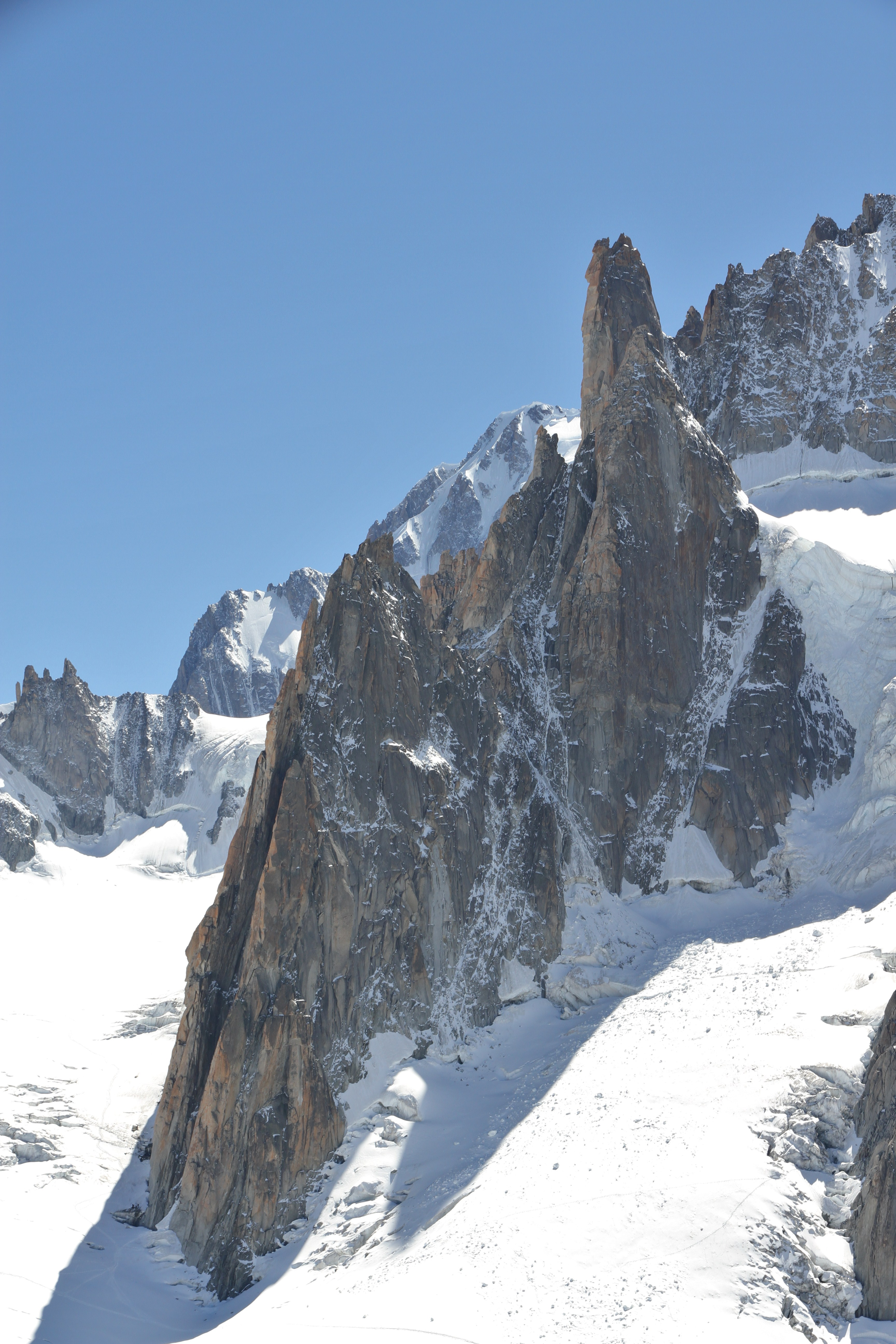
Grand Capucin (3,838 m) and its 400-meter vertical face

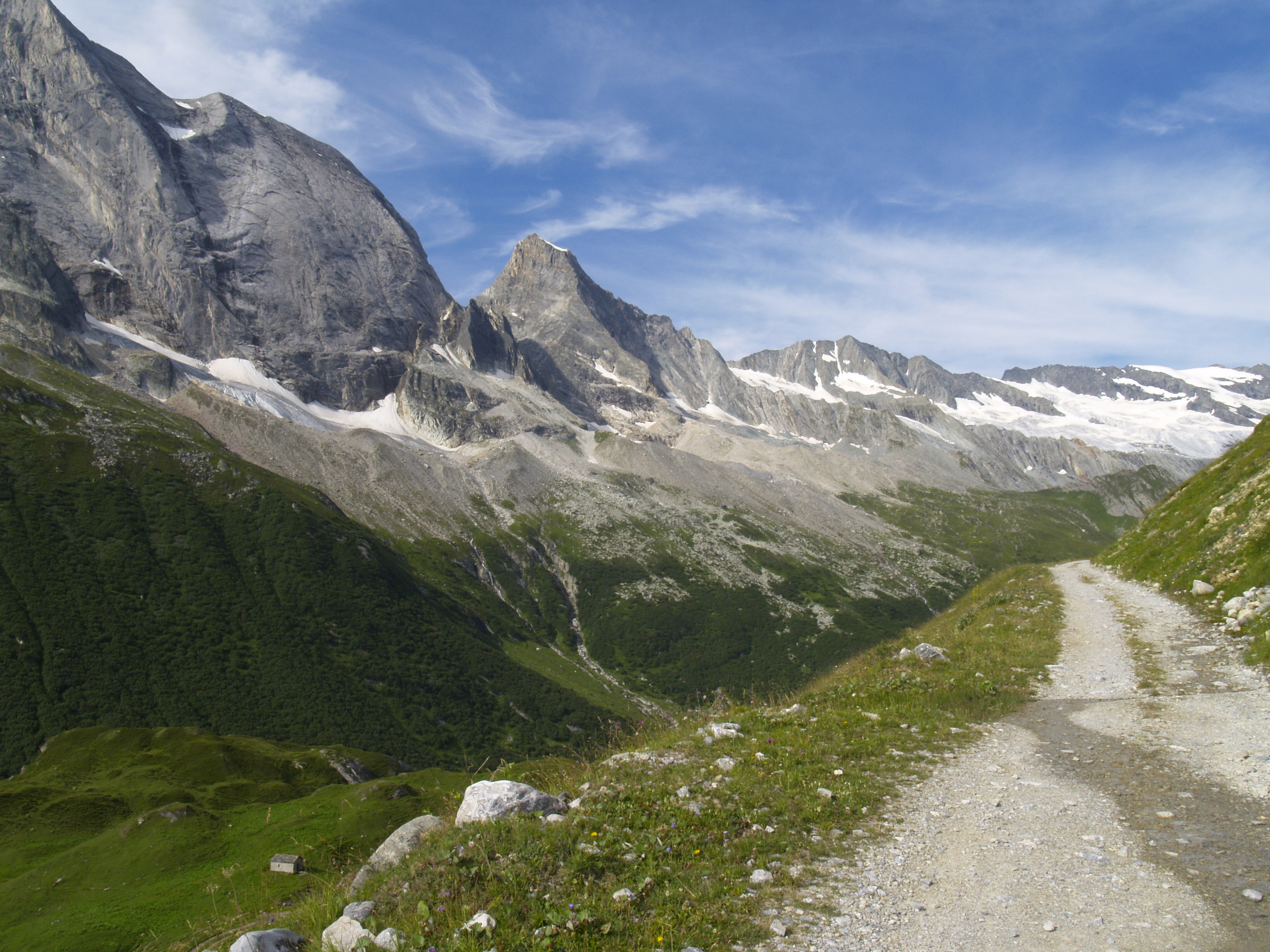
Vanoise National Park

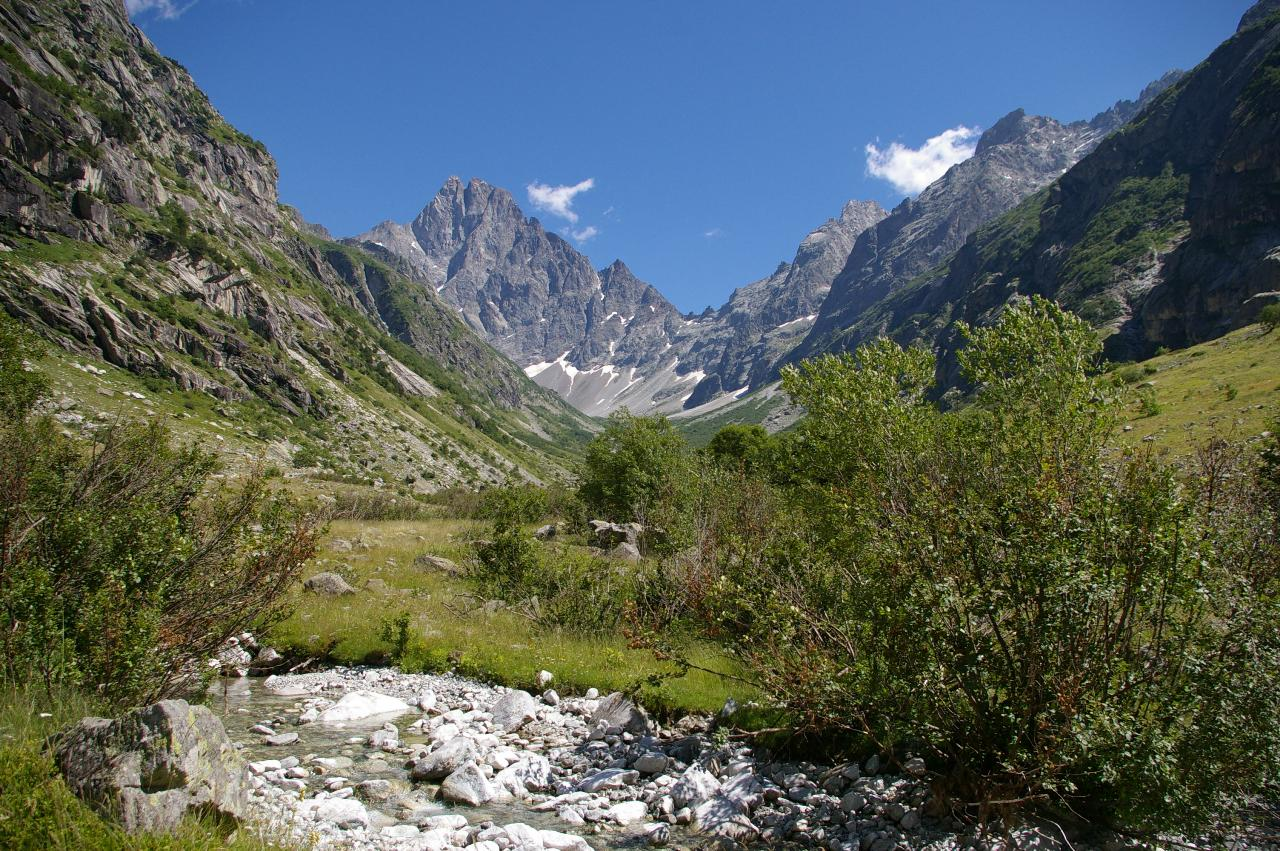
Écrins National Park

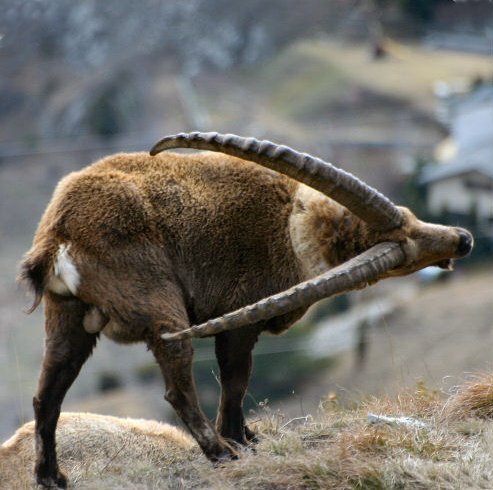
Alpine ibex in Aussois, Savoie

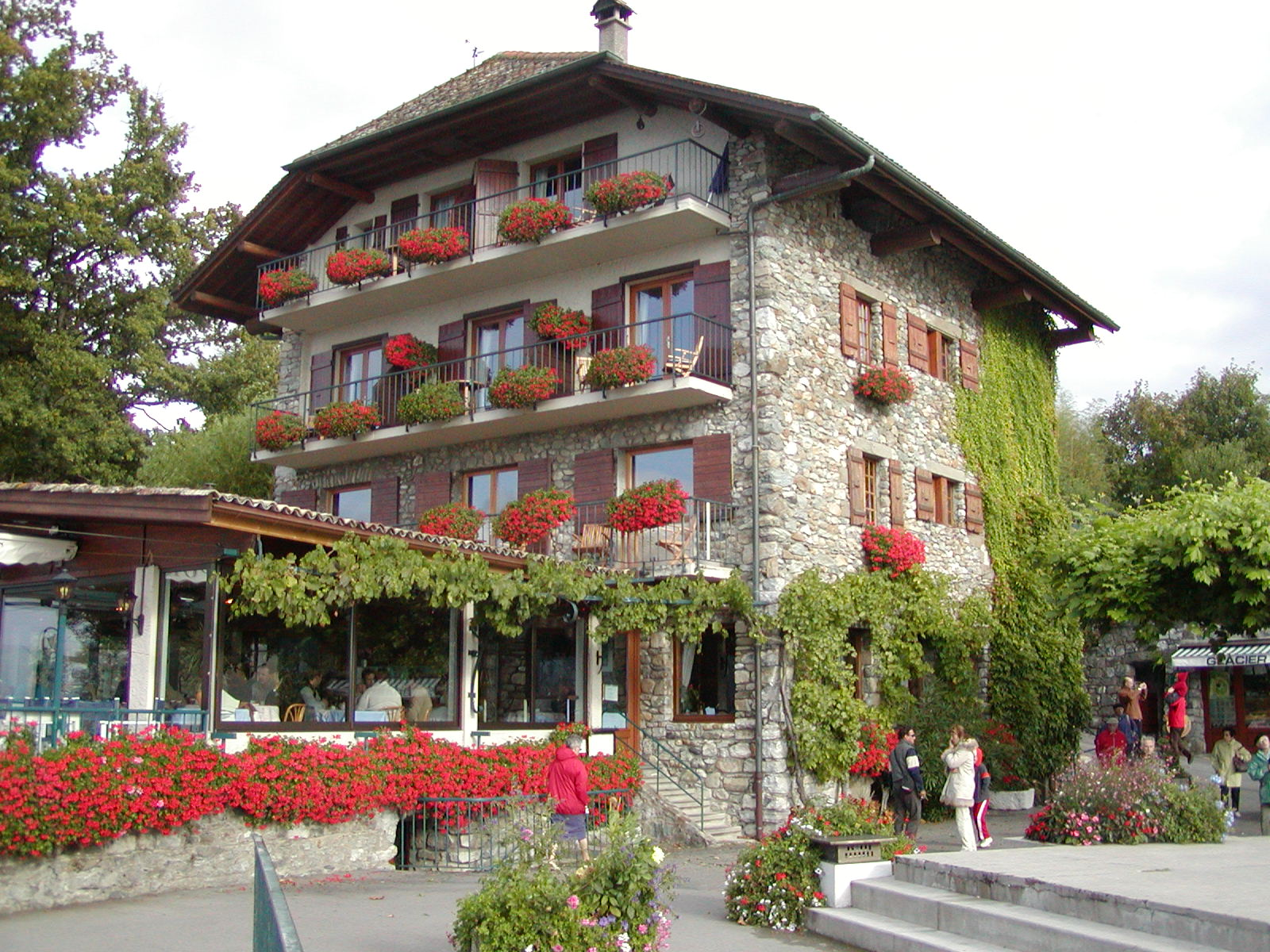
Chalet in the medieval city of Yvoire

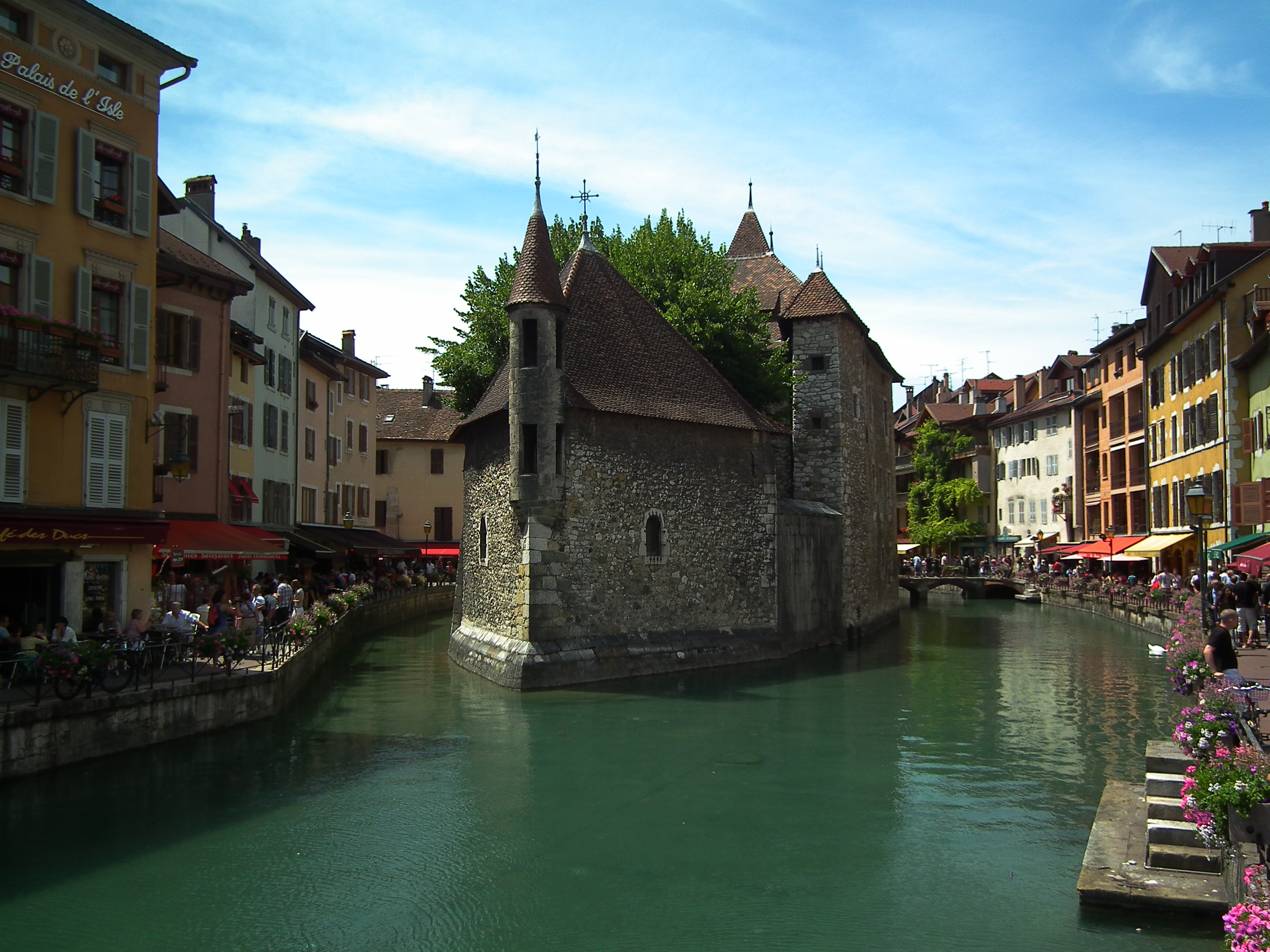
Palais de l'Isle in Annecy

== See also ==
- La Grande Odyssée
- 1924 Winter Olympics
- 1968 Winter Olympics
- 1992 Winter Olympics
- 2030 Winter Olympics
- List of highest paved roads in Europe
- List of mountain passes
- List of national parks in the Alps
- List of ski areas and resorts in Europe

== Bibliography ==
- Raoul Blanchard (1938–1956), Les Alpes Occidentales. Paris: Édition Arthaud. (French)
- Roger Frison-Roche (1964), Les montagnes de la terre. Paris: Flammarion. (French)
- Sergio Marazzi (2005), Atlante Orografico delle Alpi. SOIUSA. Pavone Canavese (TO): Priuli & Verlucca editori. ISBN 978-88-8068-273-8 (Italian)
- Sergio Marazzi, La "Suddivisione orografica internazionale unificata del Sistema Alpino" (SOIUSA) - article with maps and illustrations, PDF (Italian)
