= Gramont =

Gramont, Grammont, Grandmont, or variation, may refer to:

== Places ==
- Gramont, Tarn-et-Garonne, France
- Geraardsbergen, Belgium
- two castles known as château de Gramont (Spanish Agramont) in Basse-Navarre, one in Bergouey-Viellenave, the other in Bidache
  - Saint Theodulus of Grammont
  - Principality of Bidache (1570–1793)
- Le Grammont, a summit in the Chablais Alps
- Grandmont Abbey in Saint-Sylvestre, Haute-Vienne, Limousin, France
  - the Order of Grandmont
  - domaine de Grammont in Montpellier, historically owned by the Order of Grammont
- Grandmont, a neighborhood of West Detroit
- Grand Mont, a mountain in Savoie, France

== People ==
- as a French surname or title
  - Duke of Gramont, a noble title of the French peerage
  - Gramont family, an old French noble family, whose name is connected to the castle of Gramont
  - Augustine Grammont (1789-after 1821), French author and composer
  - Michel de Grammont (or Grandmont, died 1686), French pirate
  - Maurice Grammont (1866–1946), French linguist

=== Fictional characters ===
- Marquis Vincent de Gramont, a character from the 2023 film John Wick: Chapter 4

== See also ==
- Mount Grand, Brockville, New Zealand
- Grand (disambiguation)
- Mont (disambiguation)
- Graymont
