= Pierra Menta (mountain) =

Mountain in Savoie, France

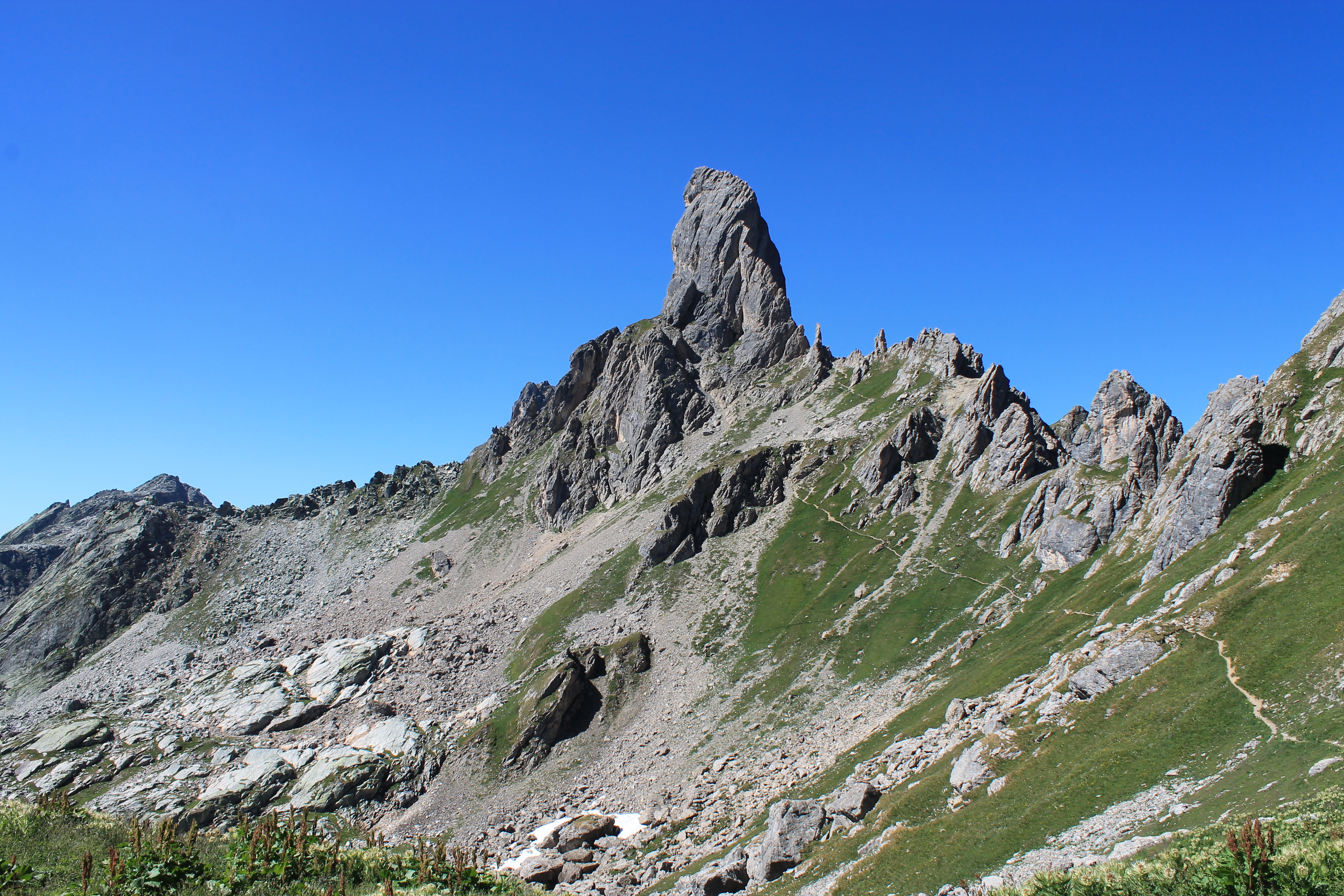

Highest point
- Elevation: 2,714 m (8,904 ft)
- Coordinates: 45°38′17″N 06°39′03″E

Geography
- Location within France
- Location: Savoie, France
- Parent range: Beaufortain Massif

Climbing
- First ascent: L. Zwingelstein and Loustalot in 1922

Pierra Menta is a mountain of Savoie, France. It lies in the Beaufortain Massif range. It has an elevation of 2,714 metres above sea level.
