= Parel (disambiguation) =

Parel is a neighborhood of Mumbai in India. It is also the Dutch word for a pearl, and may also refer to:

- Parel (surname)
- Grande Parel, a mountain in the French Alps
- Parel railway station on the Mumbai Suburban Railway
- Lower Parel railway station on the Mumbai Suburban Railway

== See also ==
- Parel van de Veluwe, a Dutch bicycle race
- Parel Vallei, a suburb of Cape Town, South Africa
