= Pointe de la Grande Journée =

Mountain in Savoie, France

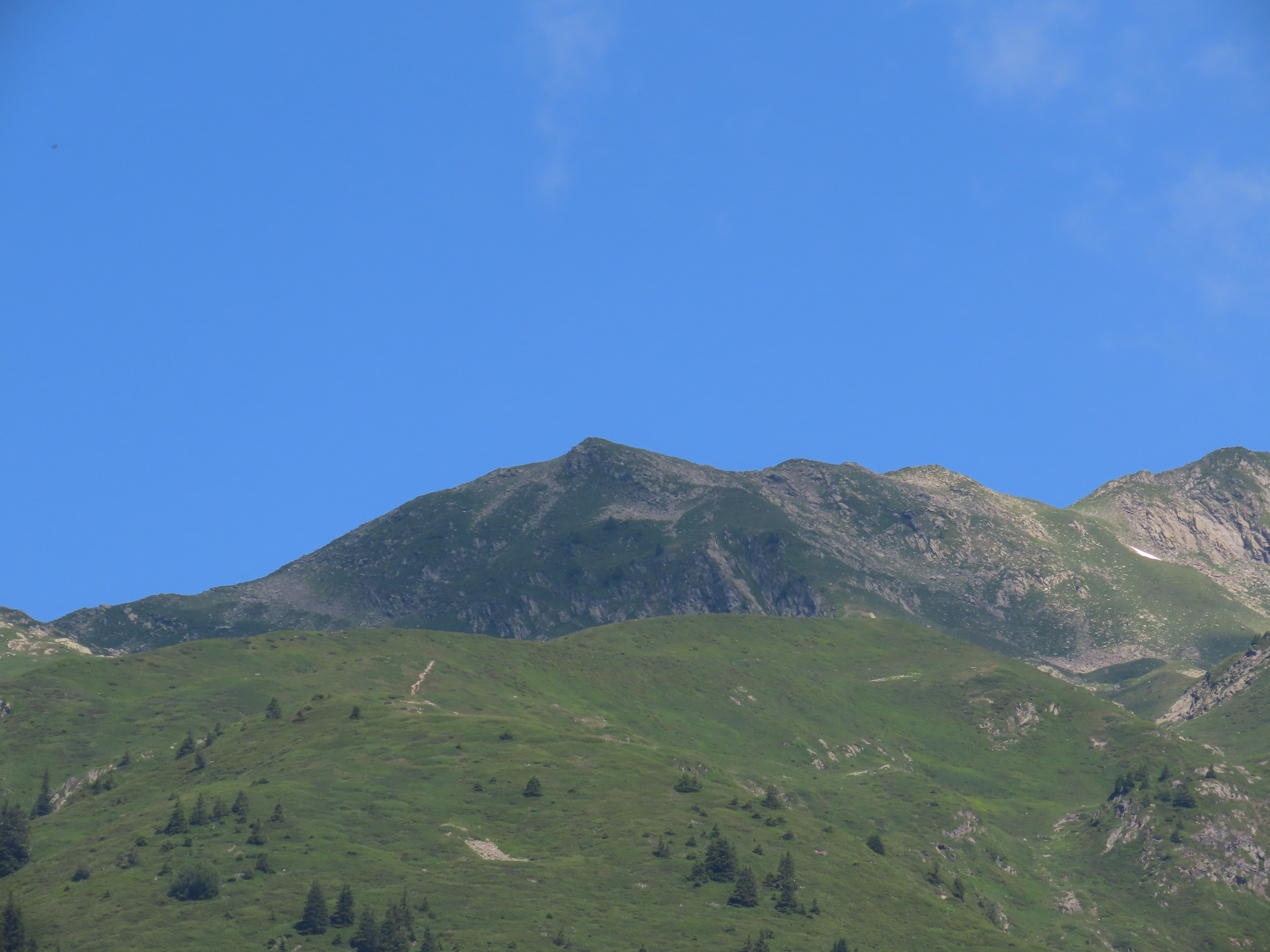

Highest point
- Elevation: 2,460 m (8,070 ft)
- Coordinates: 45°40′02″N 06°30′04″E

Geography
- Location within France
- Location: Savoie, France
- Parent range: Beaufortain Massif

Pointe de la Grande Journée is a mountain of Savoie, France. It lies in the Beaufortain Massif. It has an elevation of 2,460 metres above sea level.
