= Aiguilles de la Penaz =

Mountain in France

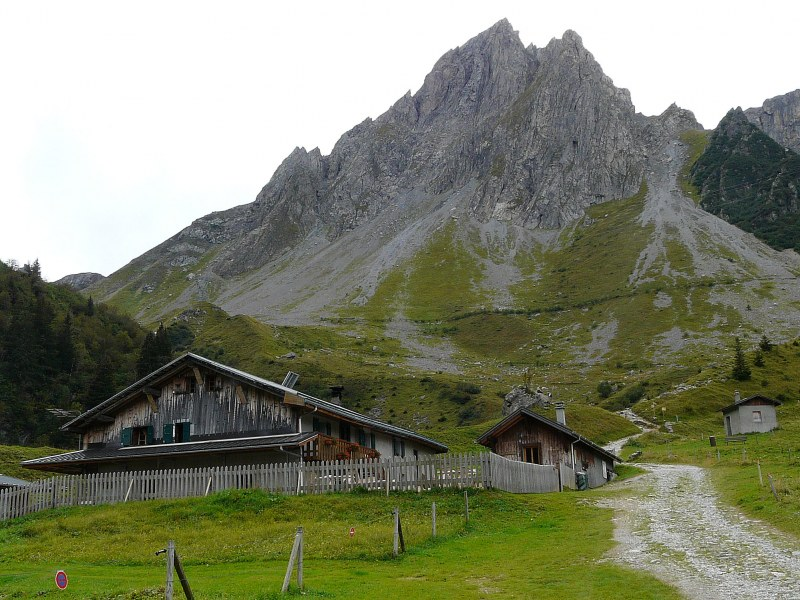
- Aiguille de la Pennaz

Highest point
- Elevation: 2,688 m (8,819 ft)
- Prominence: 359 m (1,178 ft)
- Listing: Alpine mountains 2500-2999 m
- Coordinates: 45°44′41″N 06°41′58″E

Geography
- Location within France
- Location: Haute-Savoie, France
- Parent range: Beaufortain Massif

The Aiguilles de la Penaz (2,688 m) is a mountain in the Beaufortain Massif in Haute-Savoie, France.
