= Beaufortain Massif =

Mountain range in France

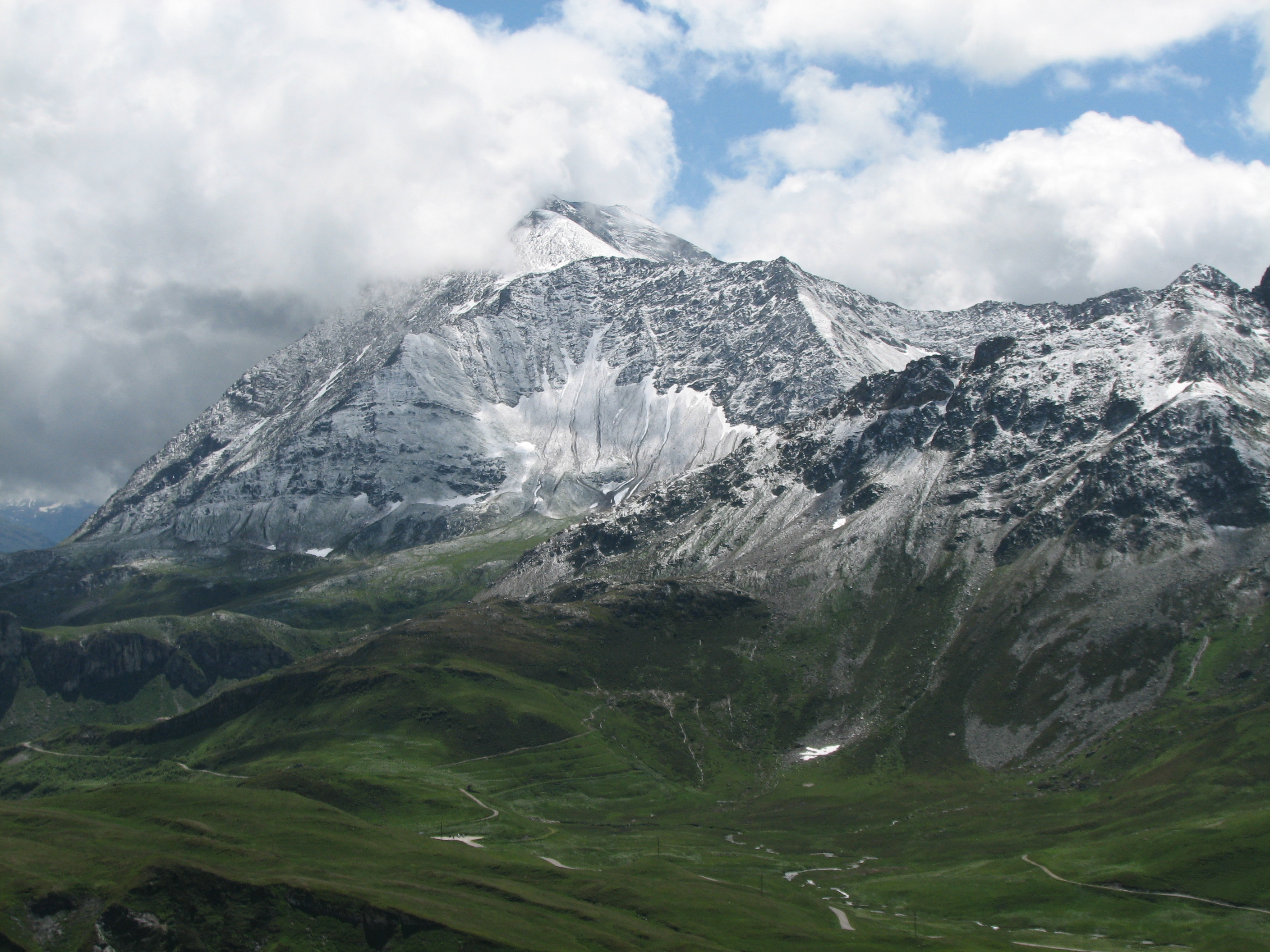
- The Pointe de la Terrasse as seen from the Rocher du Vent

Highest point
- Elevation: 2,995 m (9,826 ft)
- Prominence: 1,028 m (3,373 ft)
- Coordinates: 45°41′10.71″N 6°34′8.63″E

Naming
- Native name: Massif du Beaufortain (French)

Geography
- Location within Alps
- Location: Savoie and Haute-Savoie, Auvergne-Rhône-Alpes, France
- Parent range: French Alps

The Beaufortain Massif (French: Massif du Beaufortain, pronounced [masif dy bofɔʁtɛ̃]) is a massif of the French Alps that straddles the southeastern departments of Savoie and Haute-Savoie, in the historical region of Savoy.

It is bounded by the Arly river to the northwest, the Bon Nant to the northeast, as well as the Isère river as it runs through the Tarentaise Valley to the south. It is also crossed by the Dorinet and Doron de Beaufort rivers, in addition to their tributaries, from northeast to southwest, at Beaufort level.

It is surrounded by the Aravis Range, the Bauges Range, the Lauzière Massif, the Vanoise Massif and the Mont-Blanc massif.

== Peaks ==
Name	Elevation
Roignais	2,995 m (9,826 ft)
Combe Neuve	2,961 m (9,715 ft)
Aiguille du Grand Fond	2,920 m (9,580 ft)
Pointe de la Terrasse	2,881 m (9,452 ft)
Grande Paréi	2,725 m (8,940 ft)
Pierra Menta	2,714 m (8,904 ft)
Aiguilles de la Penaz	2,688 m (8,819 ft)
Grand Mont	2,686 m (8,812 ft)
Crêt du Rey	2,633 m (8,638 ft)
Tête de la Cicle	2,552 m (8,373 ft)
Crête des Gittes	2,538 m (8,327 ft)
Mont Coin	2,539 m (8,330 ft)
Mont Joly	2,525 m (8,284 ft)
Aiguille Croche	2,487 m (8,159 ft)
Pointe de la Grande Journée	2,462 m (8,077 ft)
Mont Mirantin	2,460 m (8,070 ft)
Roche Pourrie	2,037 m (6,683 ft)
Mont d'Arbois	1,833 m (6,014 ft)

== See also ==
- Beaufortain
