= Grand Pic de la Lauzière =

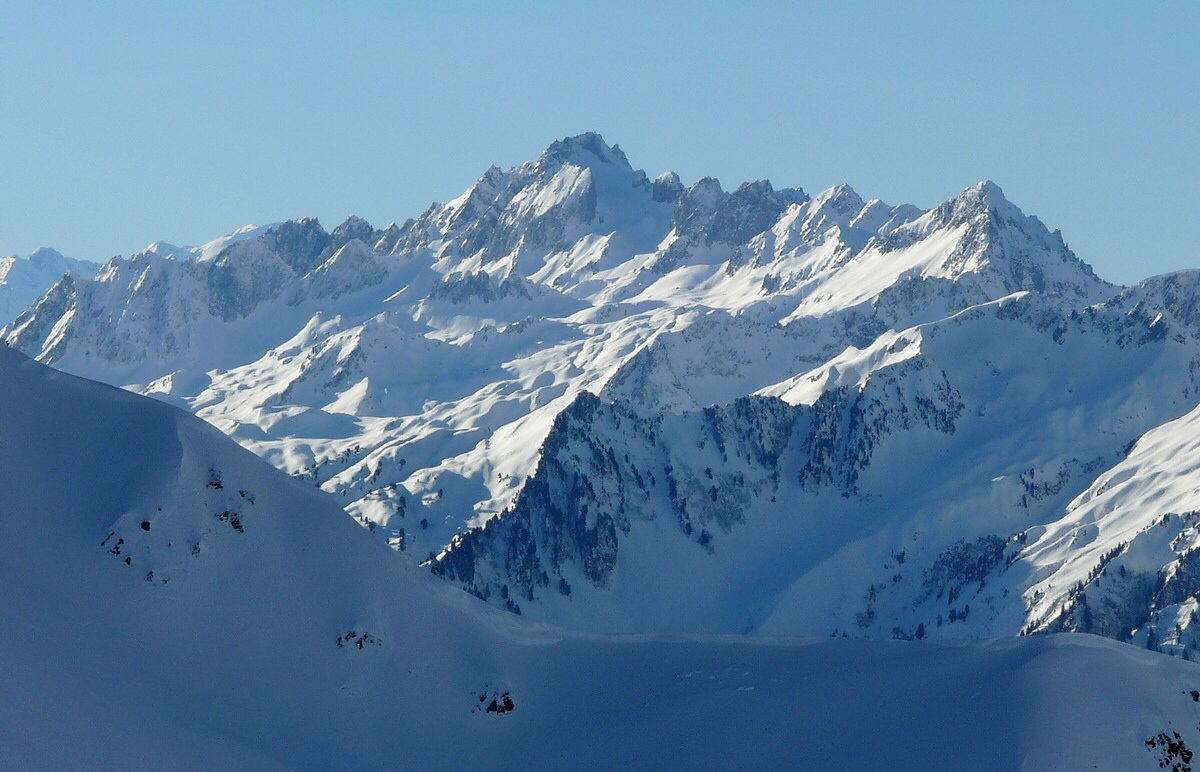

Highest point
- Elevation: 2,829 m (9,281 ft)
- Prominence: 836 m (2,743 ft)
- Isolation: 5.51 km (3.42 mi)
- Coordinates: 45°27′33″N 06°21′59″E

Geography
- Location within France
- Location: Savoie, France
- Parent range: Massif de la Lauzière

Grand Pic de la Lauzière is a mountain of Savoie, France. It lies in the Lauzière Massif range and has an elevation of 2,829 metres above sea level.
