= Mont Mirantin =

Mountain in France

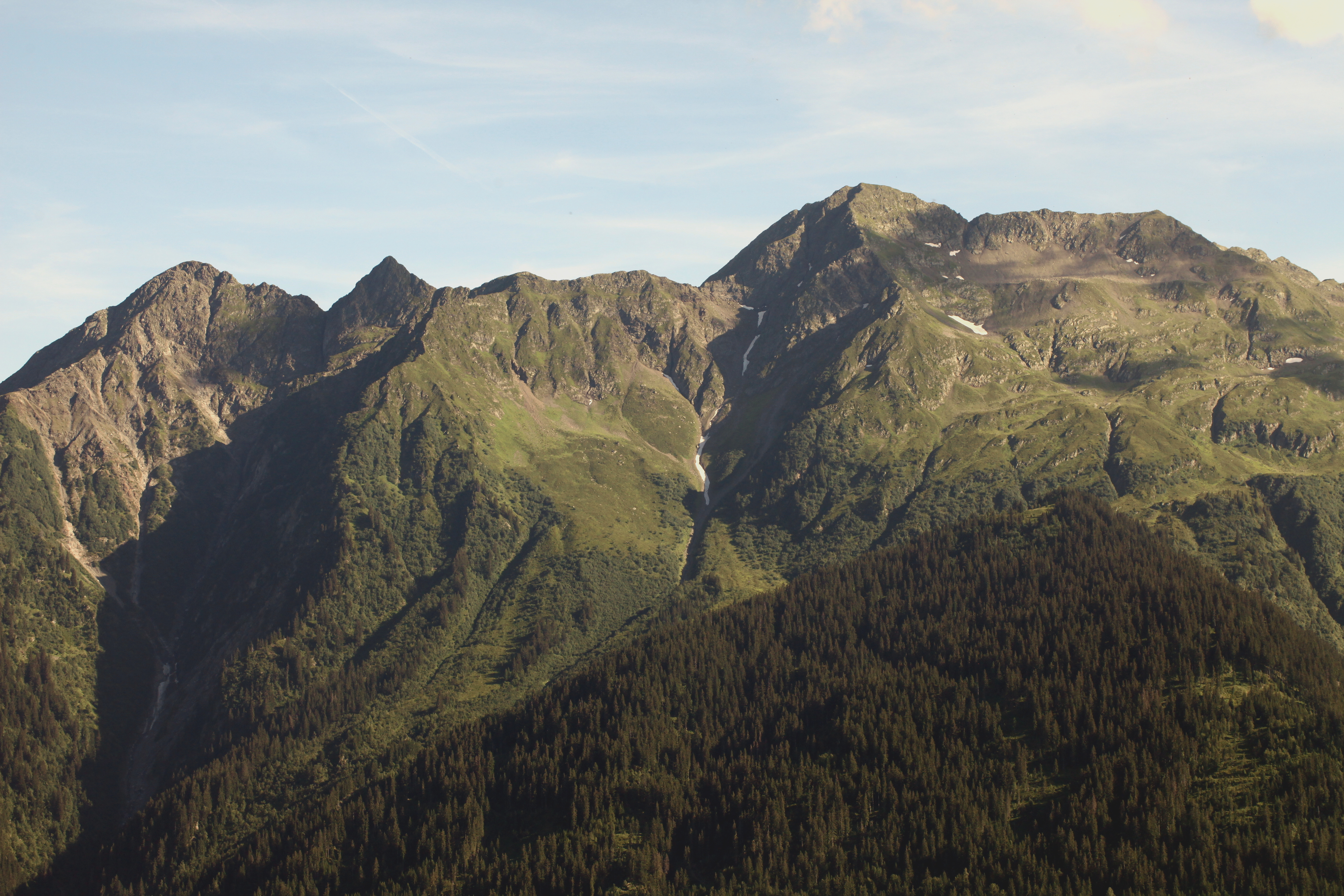
- Mont Mirantin

Highest point
- Elevation: 2,460 m (8,070 ft)
- Coordinates: 45°41′04″N 06°29′56″E

Geography
- Location within France
- Location: Savoie, France
- Parent range: Beaufortain Massif

Mont Mirantin is a mountain within the Beaufortain Massif range in Savoie, France. It has an elevation of 2,460 metres (8,071 ft) above sea level.
