= Tête de la Cicle =

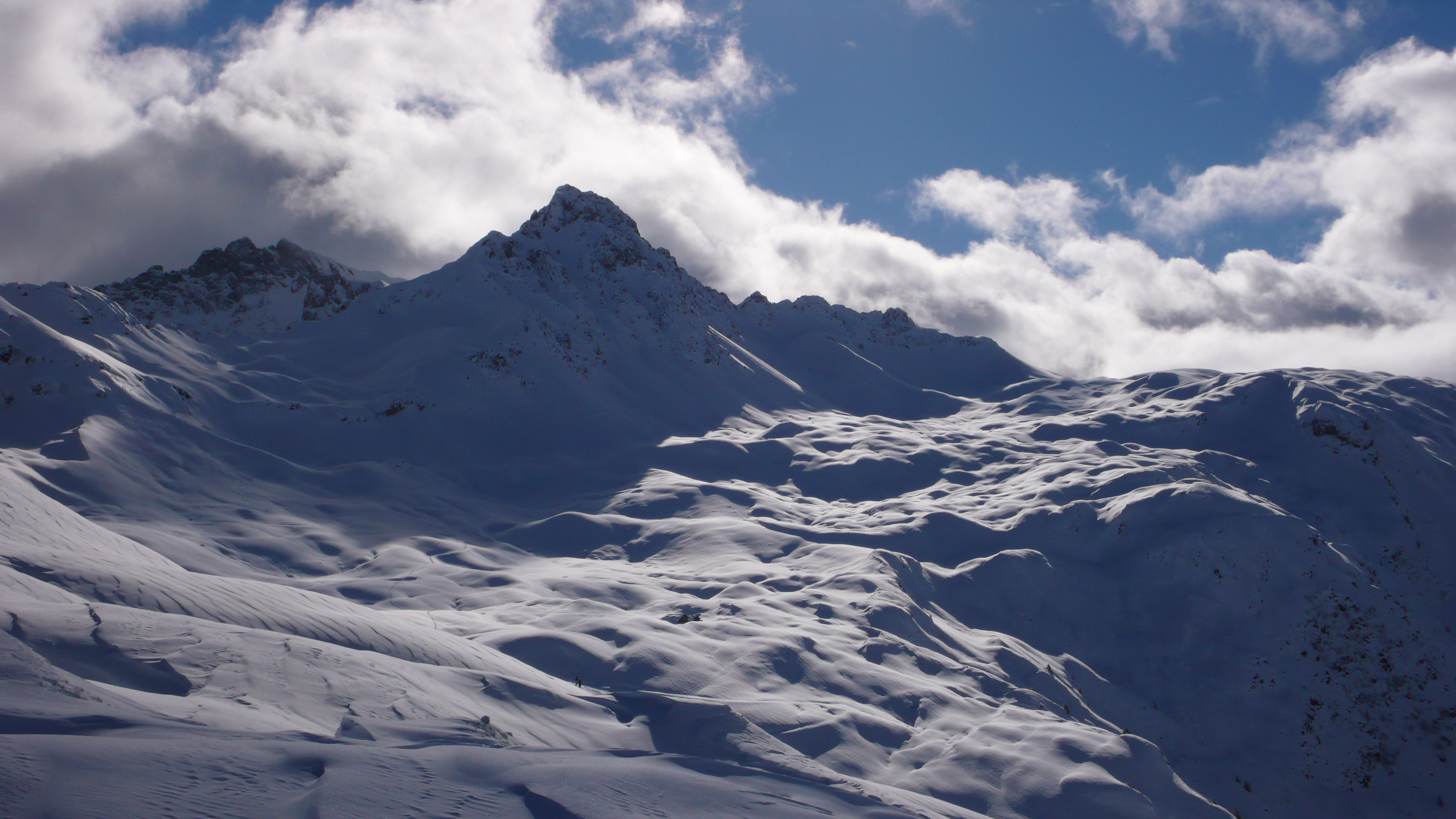
- Tête de la Cicle.

Highest point
- Elevation: 2,552 m (8,373 ft)
- Coordinates: 45°45′17″N 06°41′12″E

Geography
- Location within France
- Location: Savoie and Haute-Savoie, France
- Parent range: Beaufortain Massif

Tête de la Cicle is a mountain of Savoie, France. It lies in the Beaufortain Massif range and has an elevation of 2,552 metres above sea level.

== Bibliography ==
- Christophe Hagenmuller, Les plus belles traces du Beaufortain, Naturalpes, 2006 (ISBN 295278700X)
- Martial Manon, Panorama du Beaufortain, La Fontaine De Siloe, coll. « Les savoisiennes », 2002 (ISBN 2842062051)
