= Crête des Gittes =

French mountain in the Beaufortain Massif range

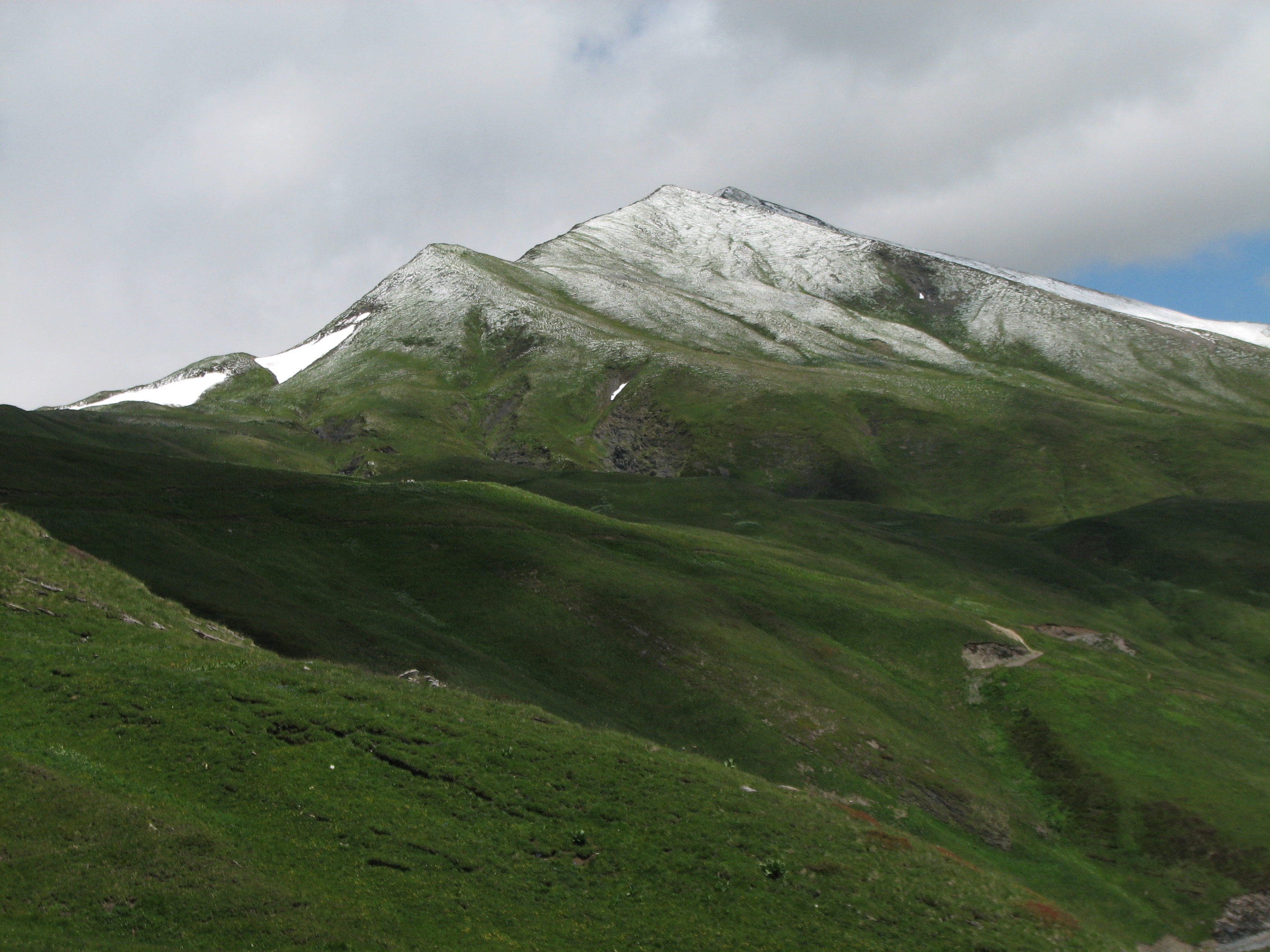

Highest point
- Elevation: 2,538 m (8,327 ft)
- Coordinates: 45°42′43″N 06°42′30″E

Geography
- Location within France
- Location: Savoie, France
- Parent range: Beaufortain Massif

Crête des Gittes is a mountain of Savoie, France. It lies in the Beaufortain Massif range. It has an elevation of 2,538 metres (8,327 ft) above sea level. It is on a popular mountain hiking trail, but is unadvisable during winter and poor weather.
