= Mont Coin =

Mountain in Savoie, France

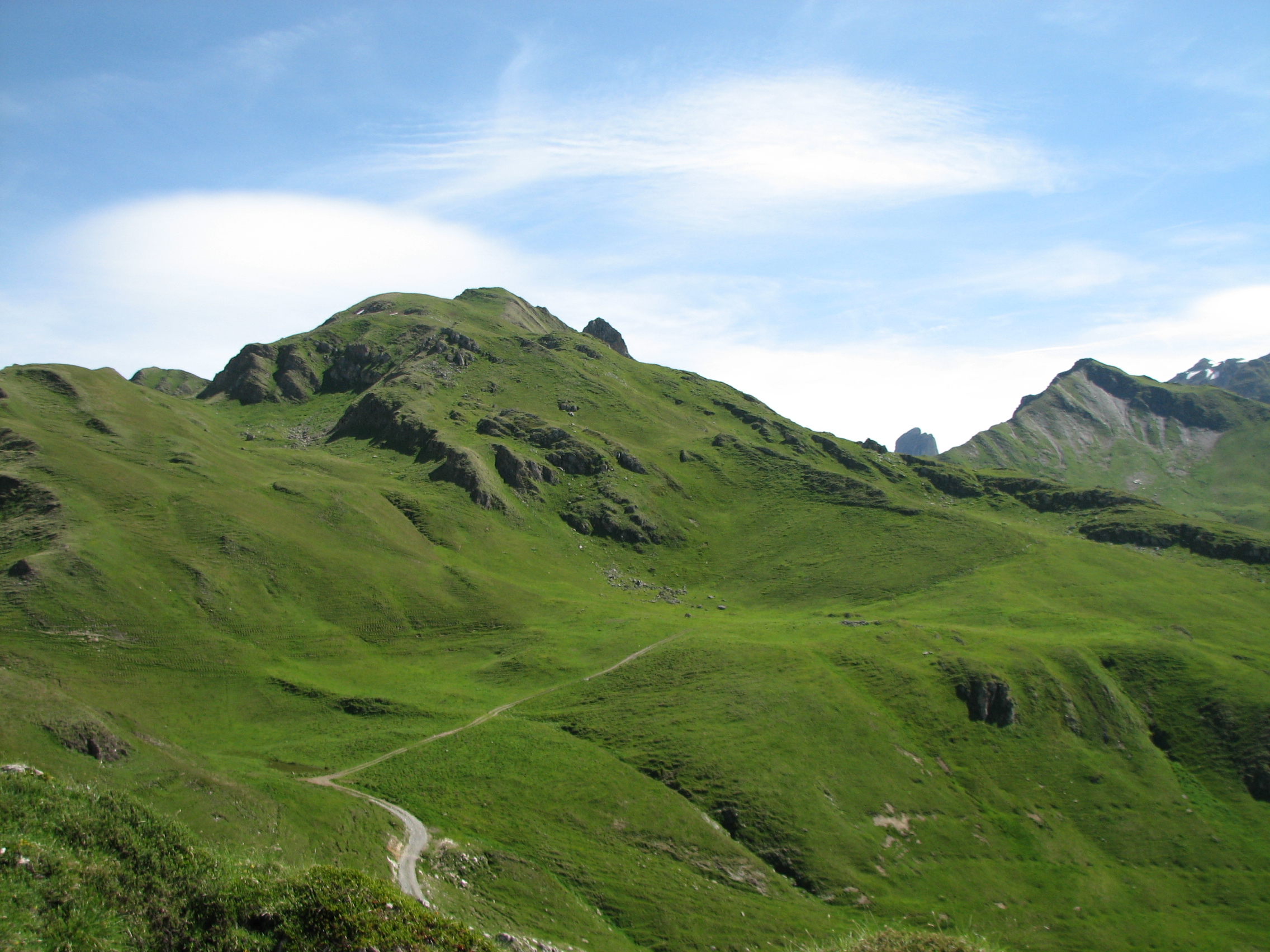

Highest point
- Elevation: 2,539 m (8,330 ft)
- Coordinates: 45°37′55″N 06°37′14″E

Geography
- Location within France
- Location: Savoie, France
- Parent range: Beaufortain Massif

Mont Coin is a mountain of Savoie, France. It lies in the Beaufortain Masif range. It has an elevation of 2,539 metres (8,330 ft) above sea level.

There are hiking trails in the area.
