= Mont Joly =

Mountain in Haute-Savoie, France

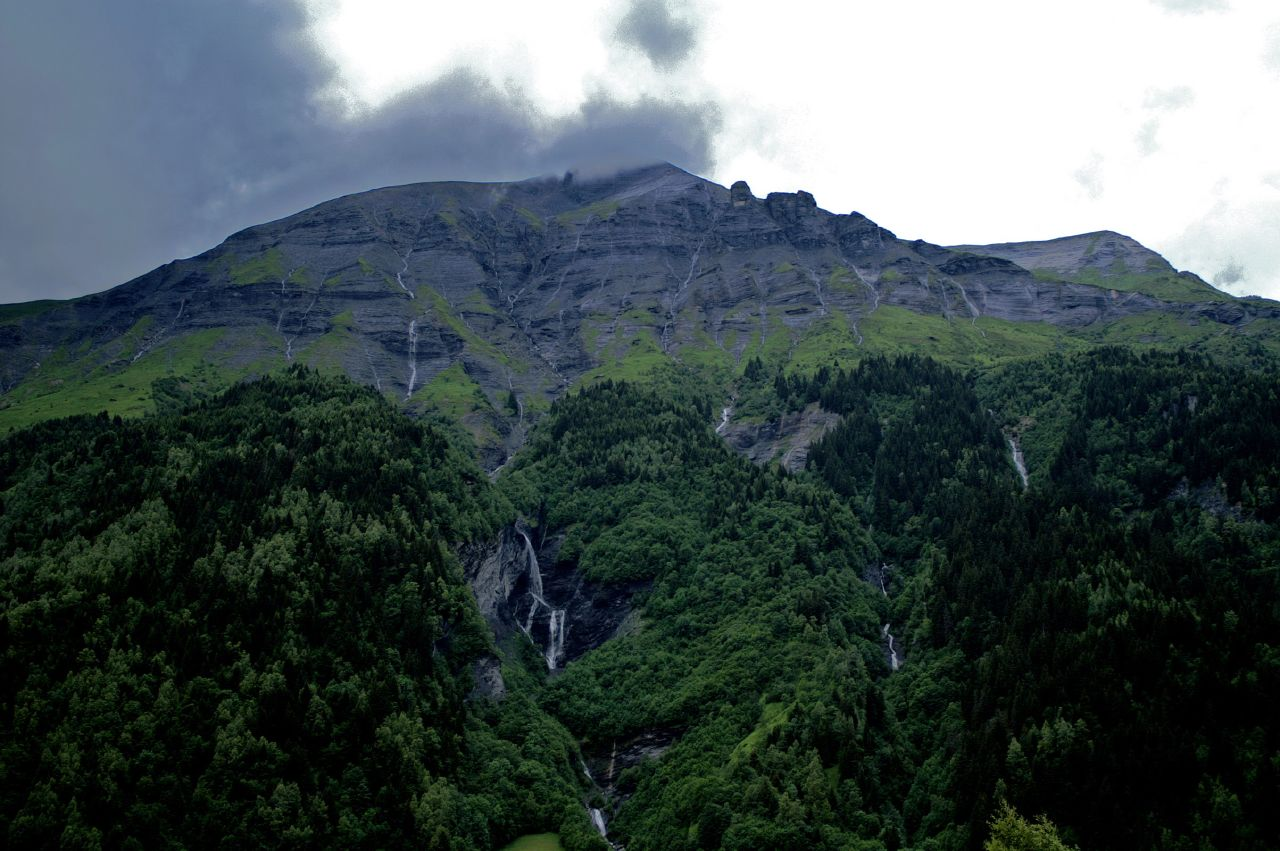

Highest point
- Elevation: 2,525 m (8,284 ft)
- Prominence: 536 m (1,759 ft)
- Isolation: 7.17 km (4.46 mi)
- Listing: Alpine mountains 2500-2999 m
- Coordinates: 45°49′33″N 06°41′34″E

Geography
- Location within France
- Location: Haute-Savoie, France
- Parent range: Beaufortain Massif

Mont Joly (2,525 m) is a mountain in the Beaufortain Massif in Haute-Savoie, France.
