= Crêt du Rey =

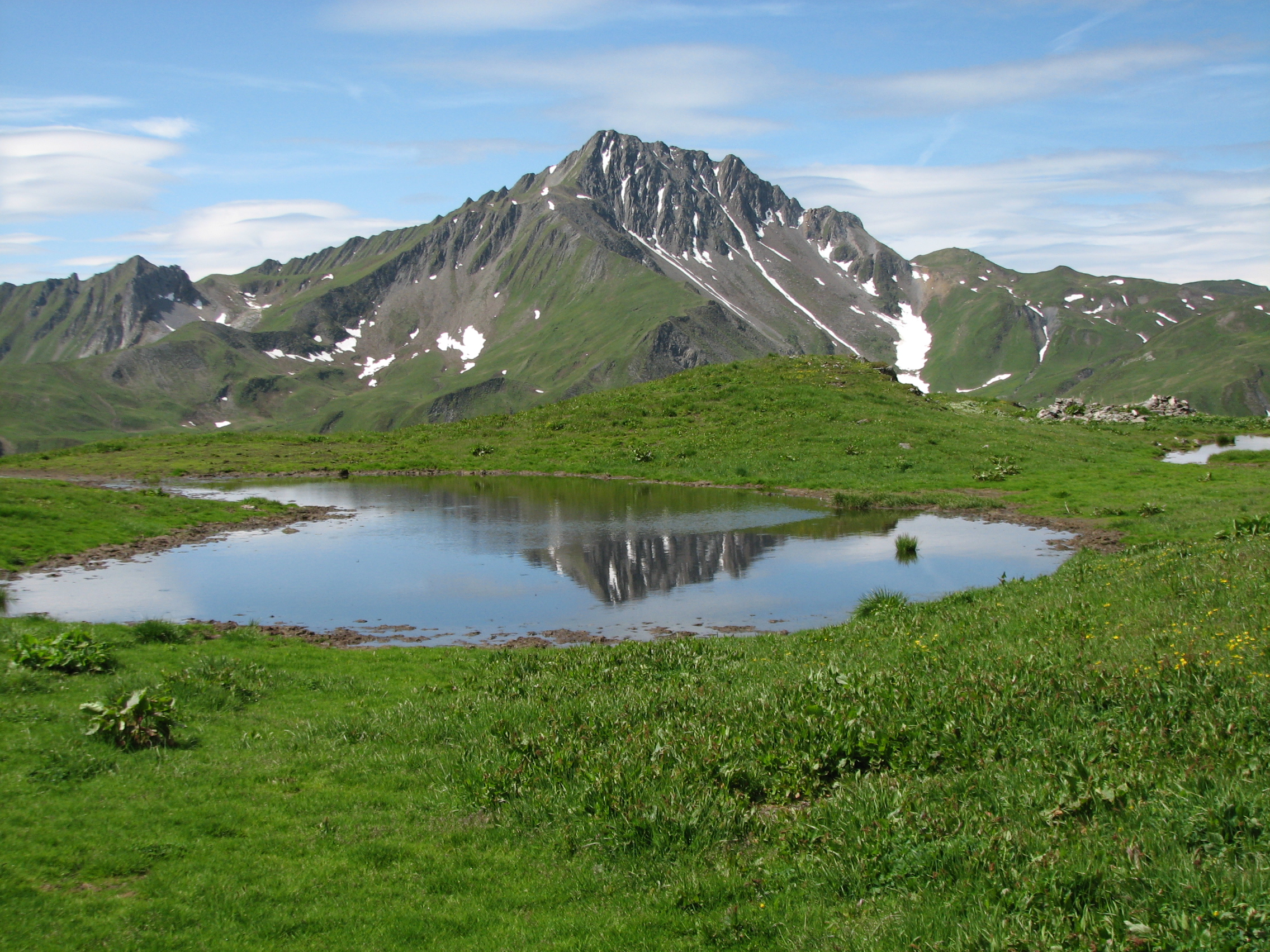

Highest point
- Elevation: 2,633 m (8,638 ft)
- Listing: Alpine mountains 2500-2999 m
- Coordinates: 45°36′07″N 06°33′57″E

Geography
- Location within France
- Location: Savoie, France
- Parent range: Beaufortain Massif

Crêt du Rey is a mountain of Savoie, France. It lies in the Beaufortain Massif range. It has an elevation of 2,633 metres above sea level.
