= Pointe de la Terrasse =

Mountain in Savoie, France

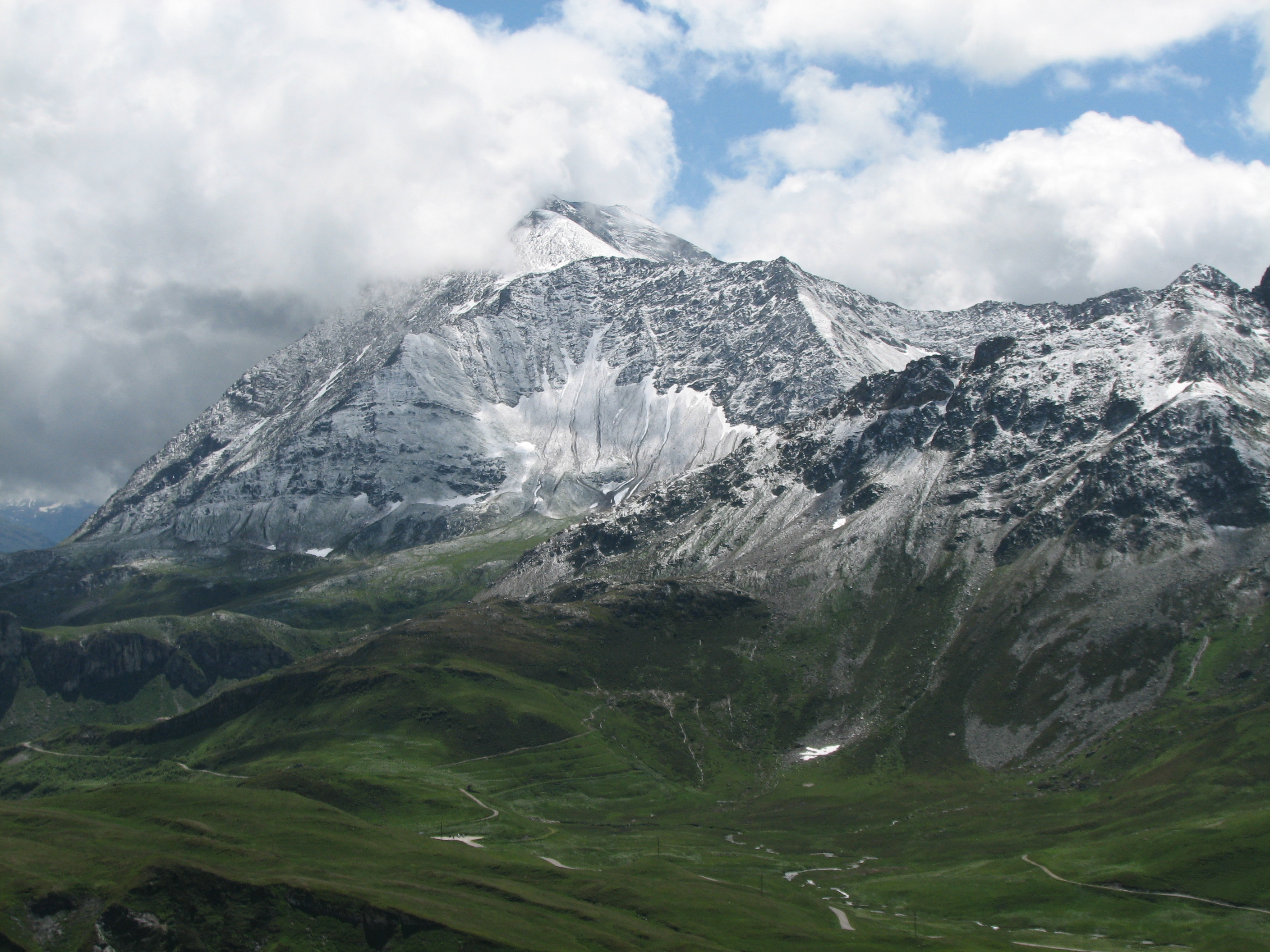

Highest point
- Elevation: 2,881 m (9,452 ft)
- Listing: Alpine mountains 2500-2999 m
- Coordinates: 45°40′13″N 06°43′28″E

Geography
- Location within France
- Location: Savoie, France
- Parent range: Beaufortain Massif

The Pointe de la Terrasse (2,881 m) is a mountain in the Beaufortain Massif in Savoie, France.
