= Parel (surname) =

Parel is a surname. Notable people with the surname include:

- Anthony Parel (1926–2025), Canadian historian
- Cristina Parel (died 2011), Filipina statistician
- Scott Parel (born 1965), American golfer

== See also ==
- Parel (disambiguation)
- Het Wonderlijke leven van Willem Parel, 1955 Dutch comedy film whose title character has the surname Parel
