= Graymont =

Graymont may refer to:

- Graymont (mansion), Virginia, US
- Graymont, Illinois, US
- Twin City, Georgia, US (formerly known as Graymont)

== See also ==
- Gramont (disambiguation)
