= Aiguille du Grand Fond =

Mountain in France

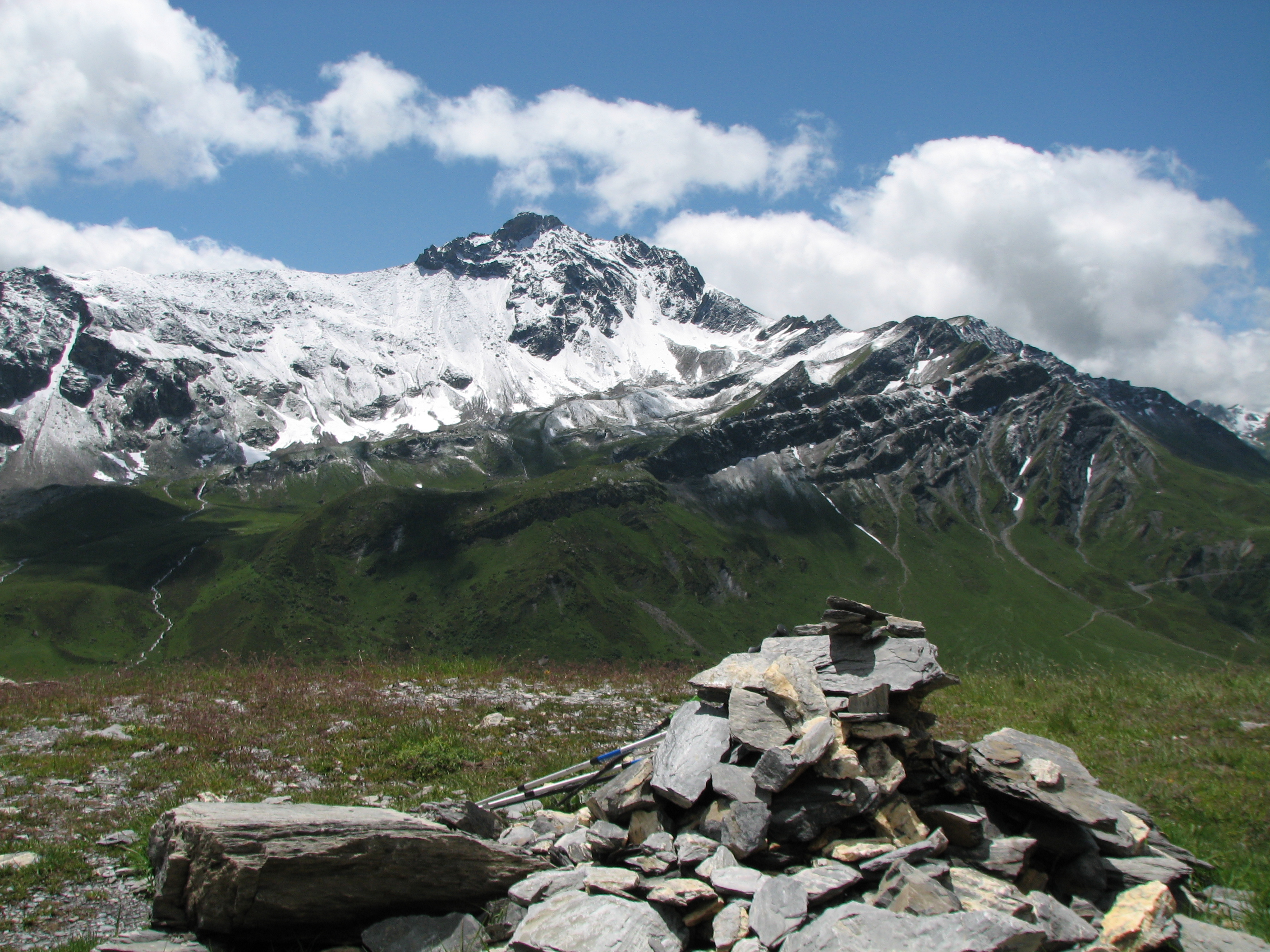
- Aiguille du Grand Fond viewed from Rocher du Vent

Highest point
- Elevation: 2,920 m (9,580 ft)
- Prominence: 298 m (978 ft)
- Listing: Alpine mountains 2500-2999 m
- Coordinates: 45°39′58″N 06°40′15″E

Geography
- Location within France
- Location: Savoie, France
- Parent range: Beaufortain Massif

Aiguille du Grand Fond is a mountain of Savoie, France. It lies in the Beaufortain Massif range. It has an elevation of 2,920 metres above sea level.
