= Roche Pourrie =

Mountain in France

- Location within France

Highest point
- Elevation: 2,037 m (6,683 ft)
- Coordinates: 45°41′03″N 06°27′37″E

Geography
- Location: Savoie, France
- Parent range: Beaufortain Massif

Roche Pourrie is a mountain of Savoie, France. It lies in the Beaufortain Massif range. It has an elevation of 2,037 metres above sea level. It has a T3 hiking trail.

The mountain offers a hiking trail. At the start of the hiking trail, there is the Parking du Col des Cyclotouristes, a car park located in Albertville, France. Further up the mountain, there is the La Roche-Pourrie. Drinking water is provided at the Col des cyclos.
