= Grand Mont =

Mountain in France

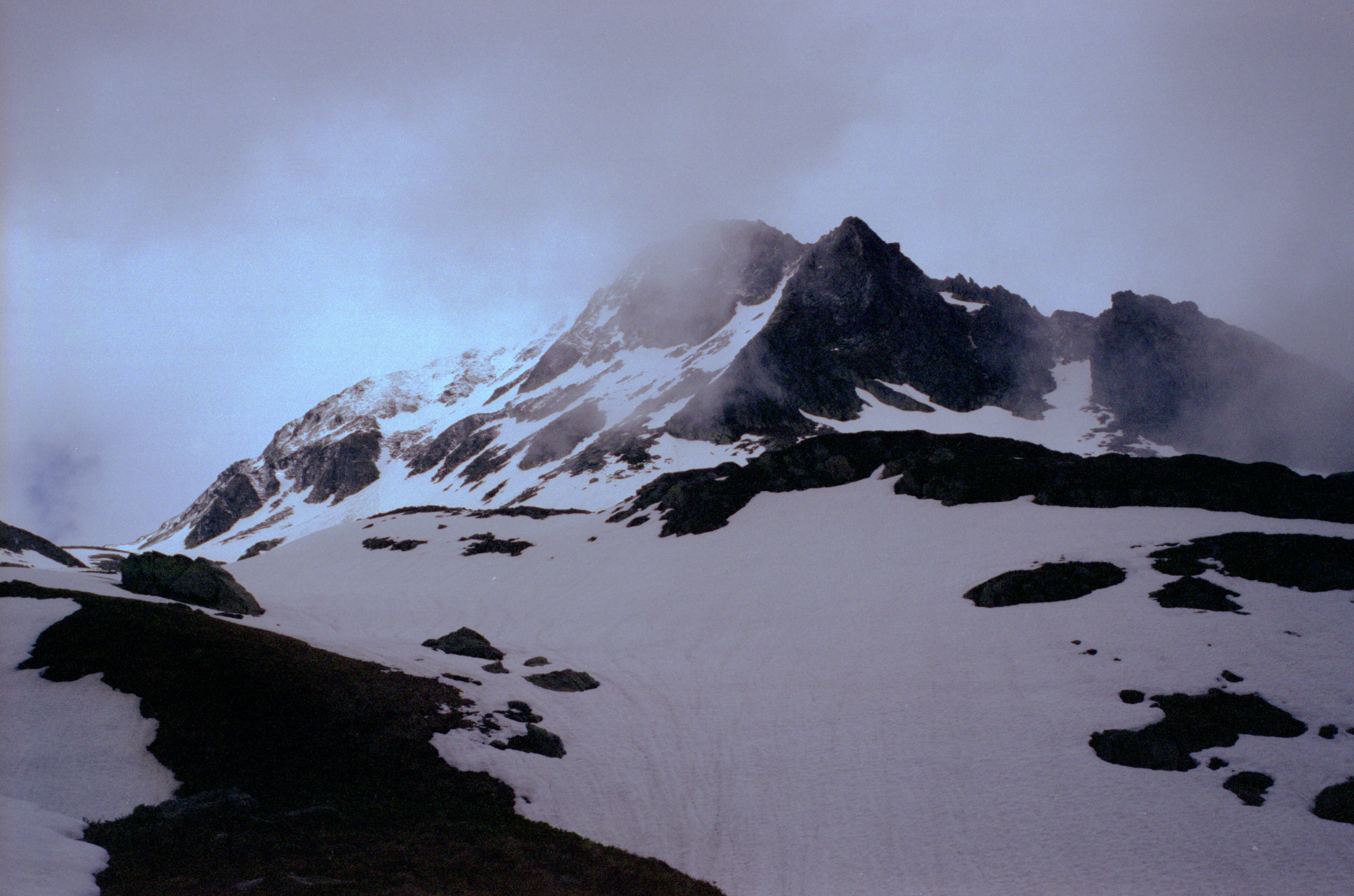

Highest point
- Elevation: 2,686 m (8,812 ft)
- Prominence: 581.4 m (1,907 ft)
- Isolation: 8.47 km (5.26 mi) to
- Listing: Alpine mountains 2500-2999 m
- Coordinates: 45°37′55″N 06°32′12″E

Geography
- Location within France
- Location: Savoie, France
- Parent range: Beaufortain Massif

Grand Mont is a mountain of Savoie, France. It lies in the Beaufortain Massif range. It has an elevation of 2,686 metres above sea level.
