= Maurice Grammont =

French linguist

Maurice Grammont (15 April 1866, in Damprichard – 17 October 1946, in Montpellier) was a French linguist.

He studied linguistics in Paris as a student of Michel Bréal, Arsène Darmesteter, Jules Gilliéron, Gaston Paris and Ferdinand de Saussure. Also, he studied Indo-European languages in Germany; at Freiburg as a pupil of Rudolf Thurneysen and at the University of Berlin under Johannes Schmidt. From 1892 taught classes in linguistics, Gothic and Lithuanian at the Faculty of Letters in Dijon. In 1895 he was appointed chair of grammar and philology at the Faculty of Letters in Montpellier, where he remained up until his retirement in 1939.

In 1904/05 he founded the laboratory of experimental phonetics at the University of Montpellier. He also worked as editor of the journal Revue des langues romanes.

== Selected works ==
- Le patois de la Franche-Montagne et en particulier de Damprichard (Franche-Comté), 1892 – The patois of the Franche-Montagne, in particular of Damprichard (Franche-Comté).
- La dissimilation consonantique dans les langues indo-européennes et dans les langues romanes, 1895 – Consonant dissimilation in Indo-European and Romance languages.
- Petit traité de versification française, 1908 – Brief treatise on French versification.
- Traité pratique de prononciation française, 1914 – Practical treatise on French pronunciation.
- Le vers français. Ses moyens d'expression, son harmonie, 1914 – The French verse; its means of expression; its harmony.
- Traite de phonétique, 1933 – Treatise on phonetics.
- Phonétique du grec ancien, 1948 – Phonetics of ancient Greek.
- Essai de psychologie linguistique, style et poésie, 1950 – Essay on linguistic psychology.
