= Roignais =

Mountain in Savoie, France

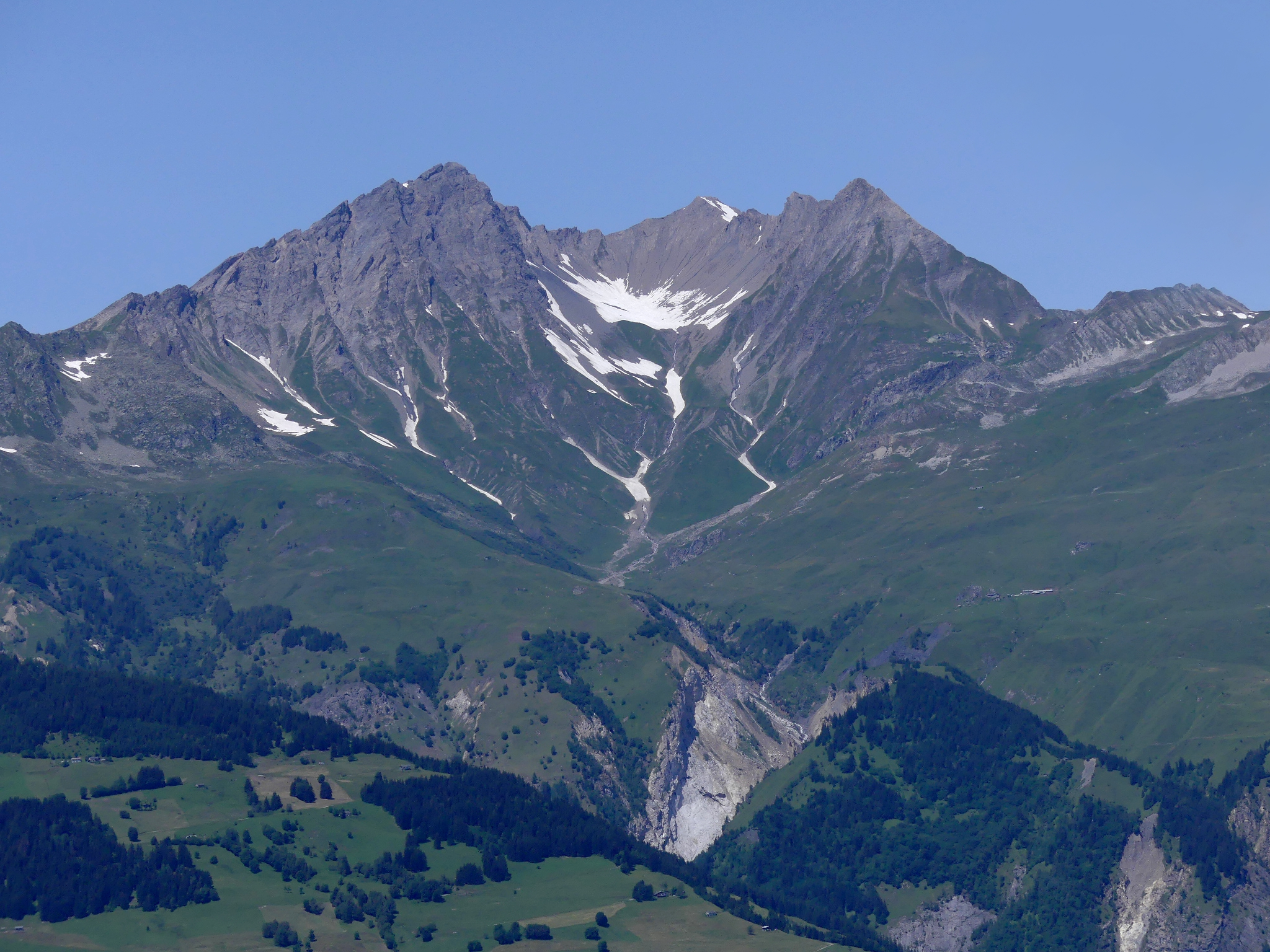

Highest point
- Elevation: 2,995 m (9,826 ft)
- Prominence: 1,028 m (3,373 ft)
- Listing: Alpine mountains 2500-2999 m
- Coordinates: 45°38′35″N 06°41′19″E

Geography
- Location within France
- Location: Savoie, France
- Parent range: Beaufortain Massif

Roignais is a mountain of Savoie, France. It lies in the Beaufortain Massif range. It has an elevation of 2,995 metres above sea level.
