= Grande Paréi =

- Location within France

Highest point
- Elevation: 2,725 m (8,940 ft)
- Coordinates: 45°37′38″N 06°38′32″E

Geography
- Location: Savoie, France
- Parent range: Beaufortain Massif

The Grande Paréi (2,705 m, sometimes written Grande Parei) is a mountain in the Beaufortain massif in Savoie, France. The Beaufortain is situated about 20 km South-West of Mont Blanc.
