= Lauzière Massif =

Mountain range in France

Coordinates: 45°27′33″N 6°21′59″E

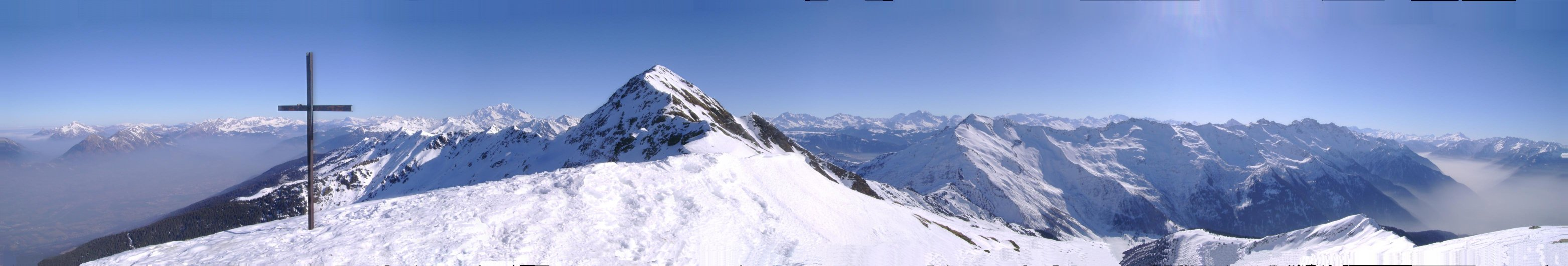

Naming
- Native name: Massif de la Lauzière (French)

Geography
- Map with subdivisions of the French Alps
- Location: Savoie, France
- Parent range: Vanoise Massif

The Lauzière Massif (French: massif de la Lauzière, pronounced [masif də la lozjɛʁ]) is an alpine mountain range in Savoie, France. It lies northwest of the larger Vanoise Massif. It has an elevation of 2,829 metres above sea level.

== See also ==
- French Alps
