= Monte Zucco =

Mountain in Italy

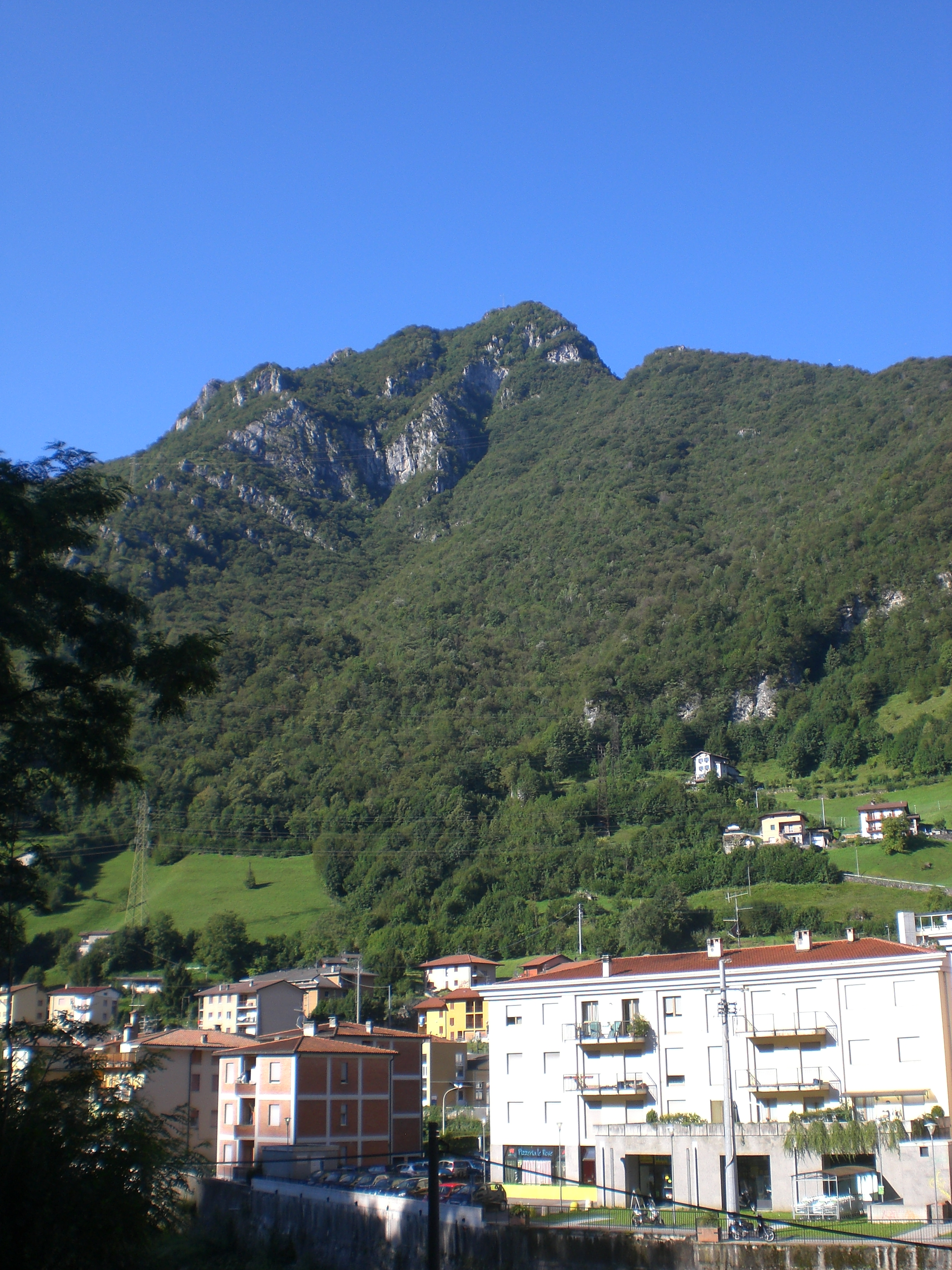

Highest point
- Elevation: 1,232 m (4,042 ft)
- Coordinates: 45°49′16″N 09°39′22″E

Geography
- Location within Italy
- Location: Lombardy, Italy
- Parent range: Bergamo Alps

Monte Zucco (pronounced [ˈmonte dˈdzukko]) is a mountain of Lombardy, Italy. It is located within the Bergamo Alps.
