= Rodes (disambiguation) =

Rodès is a town in southern France.

Rodes may also refer to:

== People ==
- Rodes, people with the surname Rodes
- Rodes K. Myers, Lt. Governor of Kentucky, United States (1939–1943)

== Places ==
- Pizzo di Rodes, a mountain in Lombardy, Italy
- Rodes, West Virginia, United States, a small town in Raleigh County

== Other ==
- Rodes baronets, a title in England (1641–1743)
