= Pizzo Porola =

Mountain in Italy

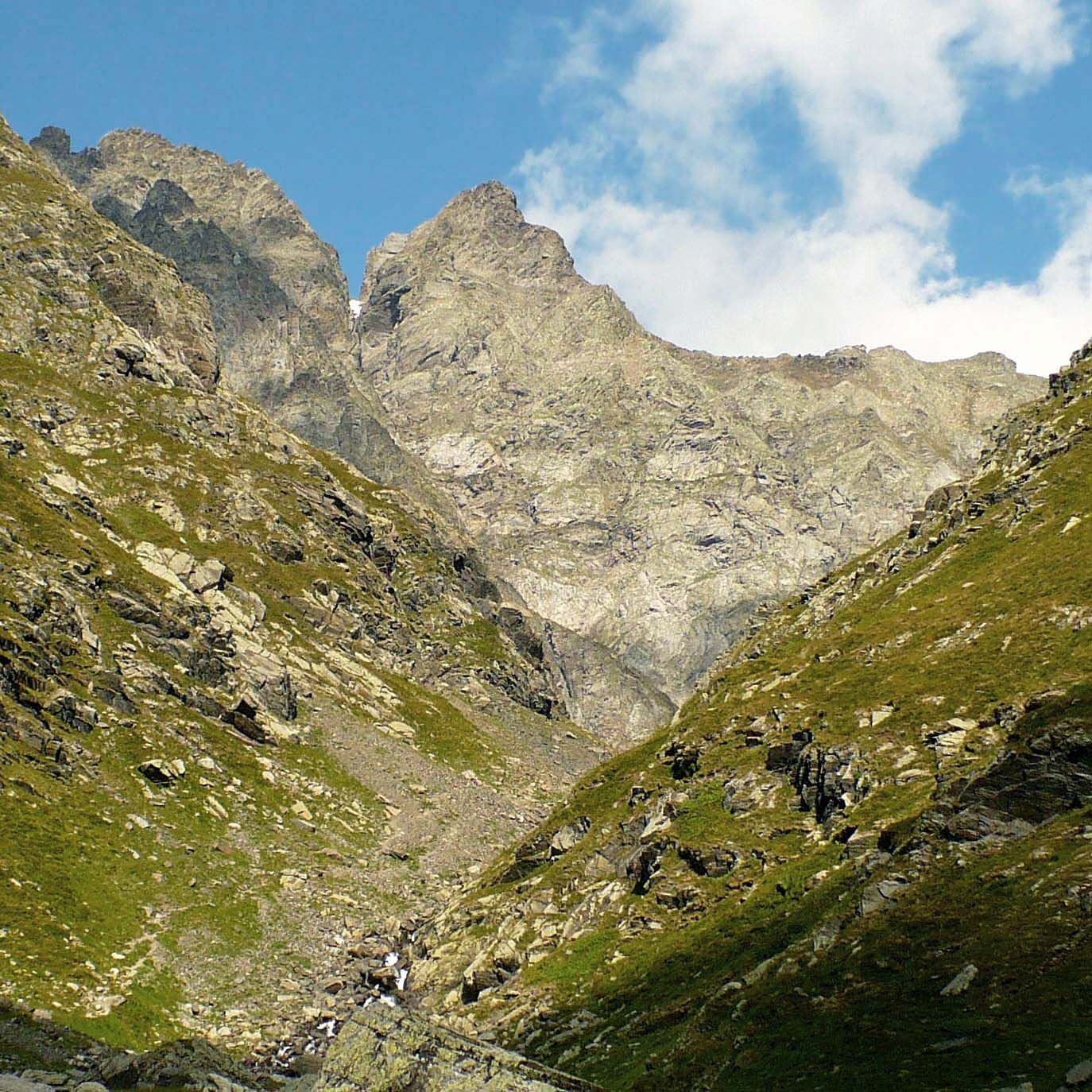

Highest point
- Elevation: 2,981 m (9,780 ft)

Geography
- Location: Lombardy, Italy
- Parent range: Orobic Alps

Pizzo Porola is a mountain of Lombardy, Italy, with an elevation of 2,981 metres (9,780 ft). It is the fourth highest peak of the Orobic Alps, after Pizzo Coca, Pizzo Redorta and Punta Scais.

Located on the watershed that divides the Valtellina (province of Sondrio) from the Val Seriana (province of Bergamo), Pizzo Porola lies north of Pizzo Scais and southwest of Passo Coca. Its northwestern side contains a small glacier, the Vedretta di Porola.
