= Monte Scanapà =

Mountain in Italy

Coordinates: 45°55′22″N 10°05′26″E

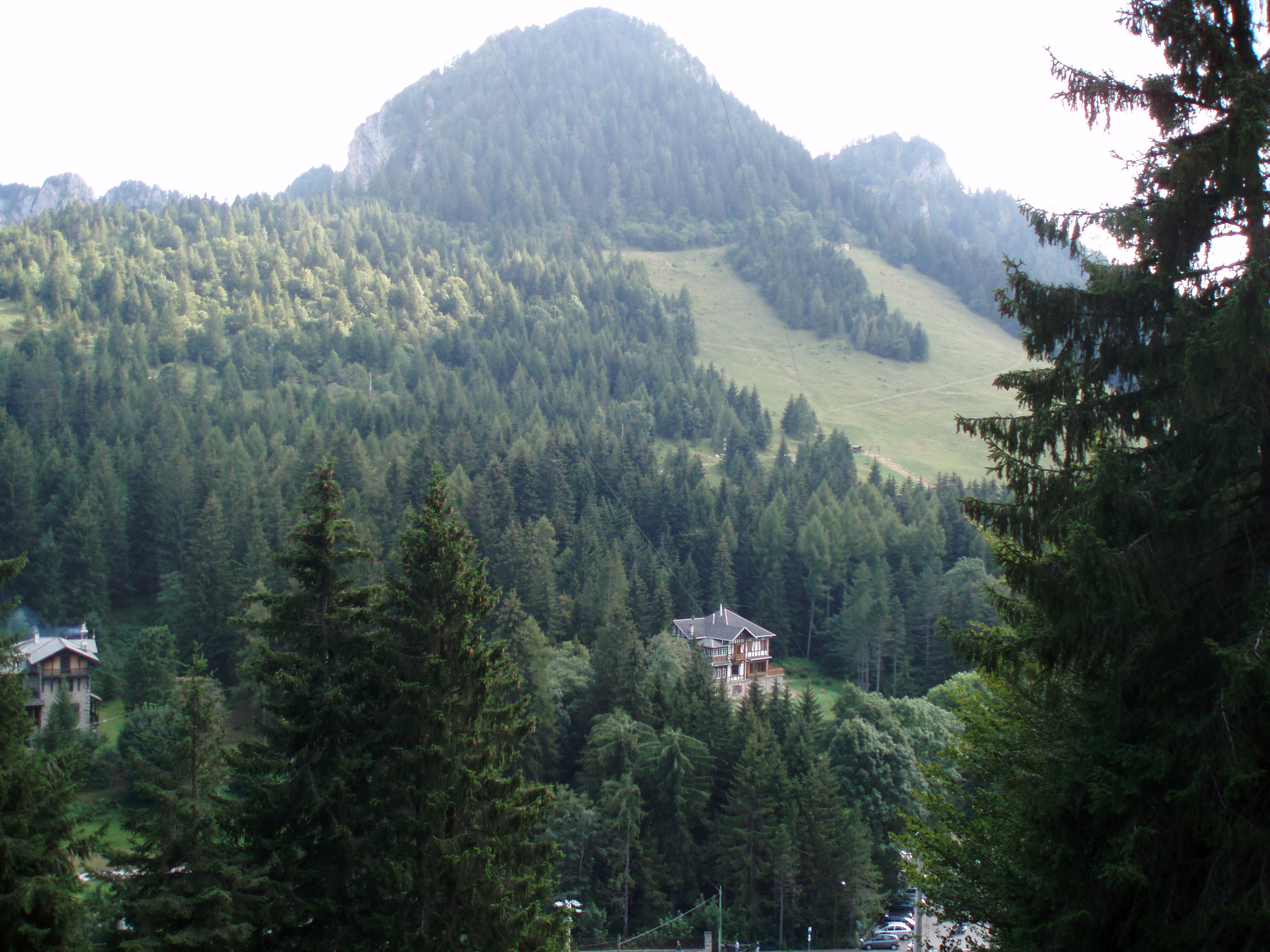

Highest point
- Elevation: 1,669 m (5,476 ft)

Geography
- Location: Lombardy, Italy
- Parent range: Bergamo Alps

Monte Scanapà is a mountain of Lombardy, Italy. It is located within the Bergamo Alps. The mountain is a popular destination for hiking.
