= Pizzo dei Tre Confini =

Mountain of Lombardy, Italy

Coordinates: 46°02′59″N 10°04′59″E

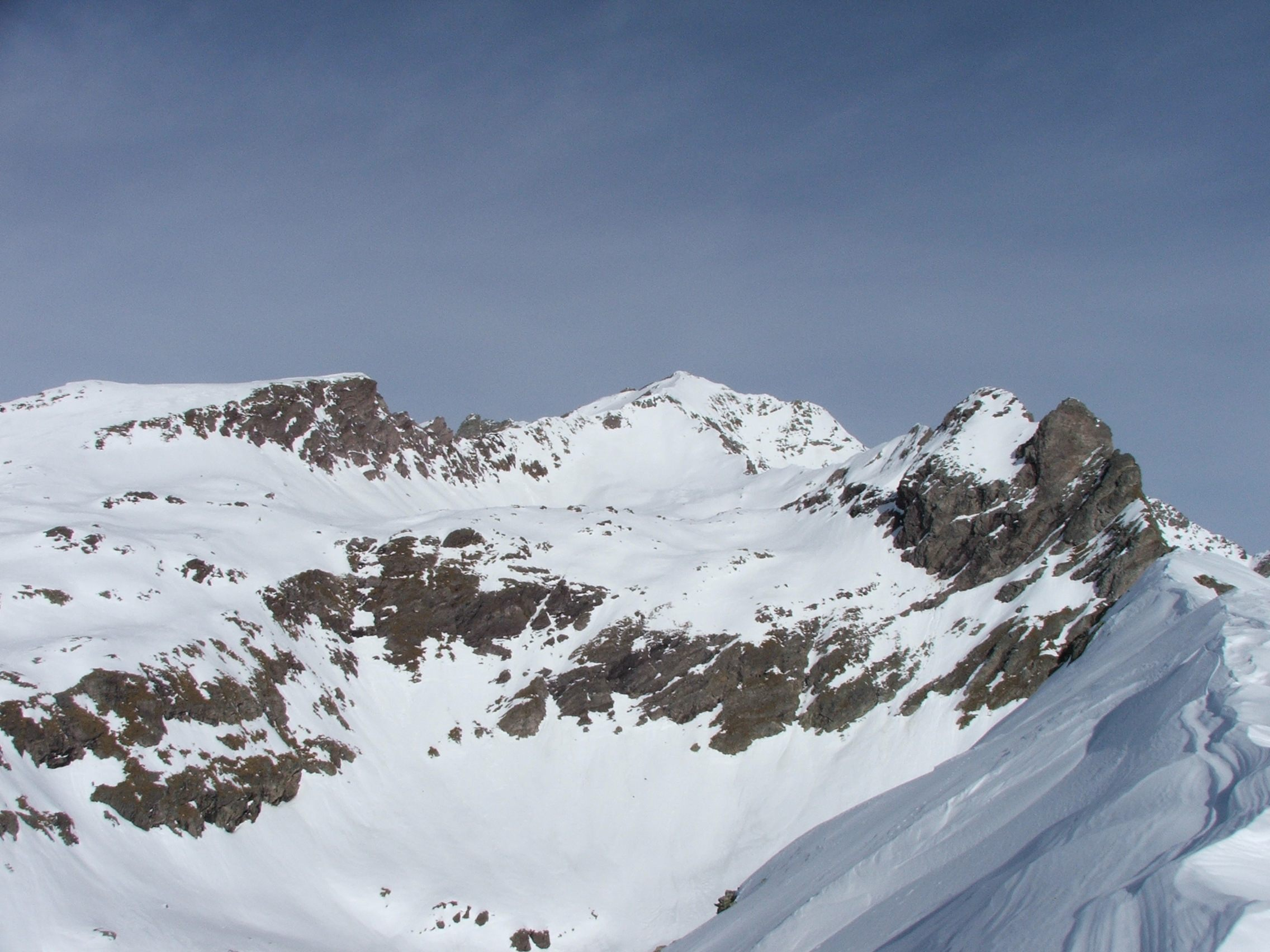

Highest point
- Elevation: 2,824 m (9,265 ft)

Geography
- Location: Lombardy, Italy
- Parent range: Bergamo Alps

Pizzo dei Tre Confini is a mountain of Lombardy, Italy. It is located within the Bergamo Alps.
