= Pizzo del Becco =

Mountain of Lombardy, Italy

Coordinates: 46°00′17″N 9°48′57″E

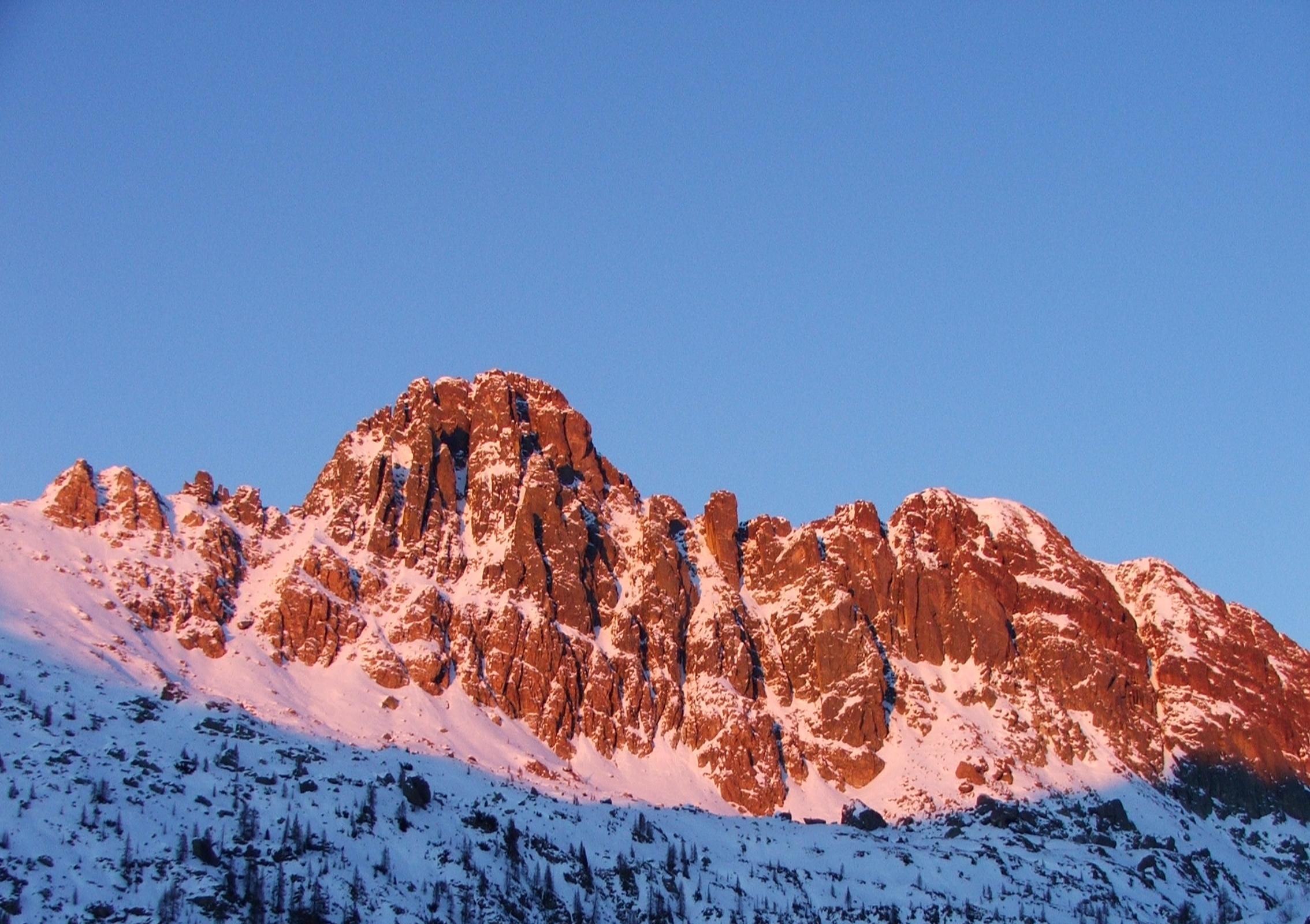

Highest point
- Elevation: 2,507 m (8,225 ft)

Geography
- Location: Lombardy, Italy
- Parent range: Bergamo Alps

Pizzo del Becco is a mountain of Lombardy, Italy. It is located within the Bergamo Alps. There are mountain hiking trails and a rifugio during the summer season.

== See also ==
- Conservation in Italy
