= Pizzo Rotondo (Orobie) =

Mountain in Italy

Coordinates: 46°03′07″N 9°41′11″E

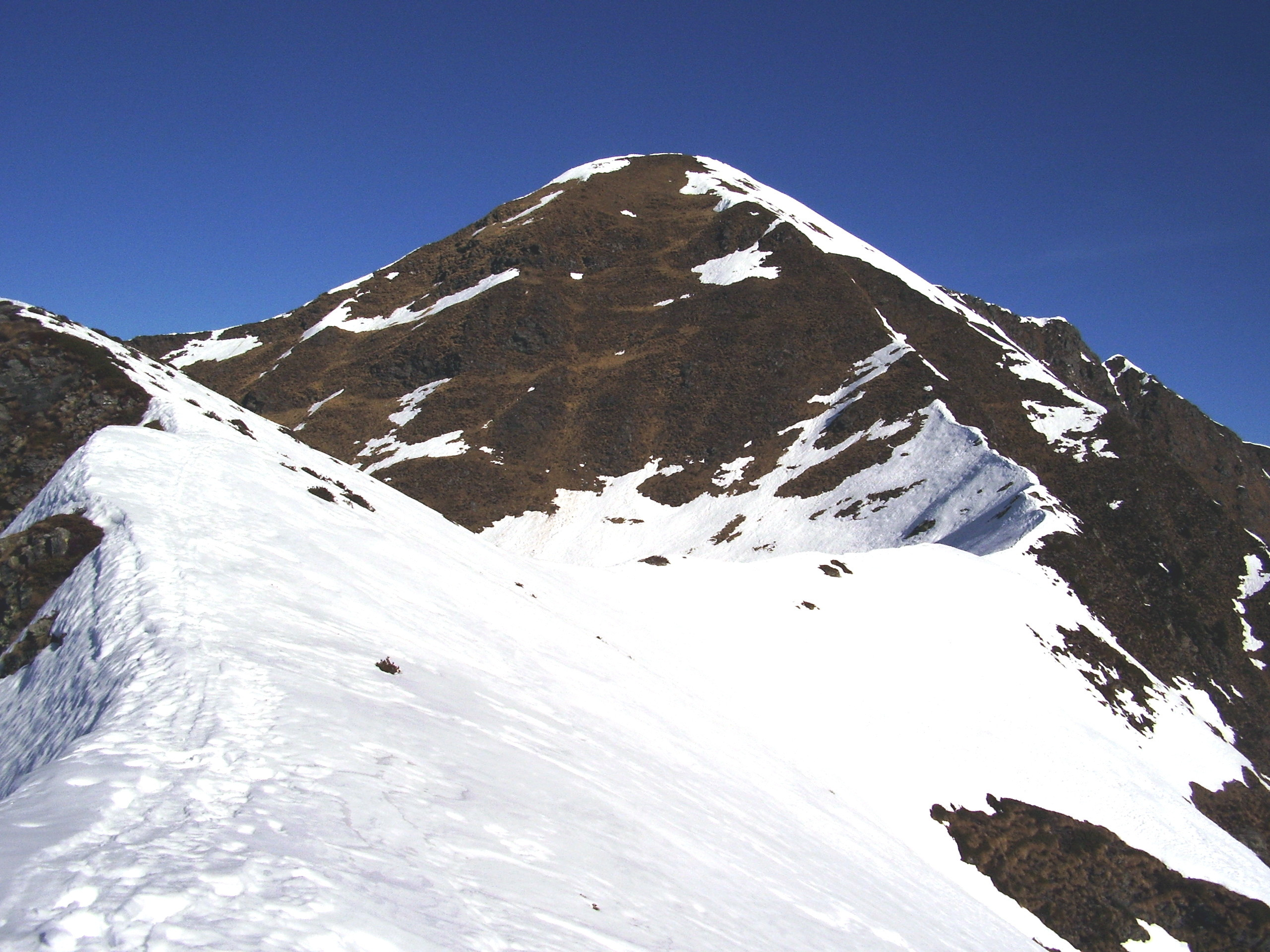

Highest point
- Elevation: 2,237 m (7,339 ft)

Geography
- Location: Lombardy, Italy
- Parent range: Bergamo Alps

Pizzo Rotondo (Orobie) is a mountain of Lombardy, Italy. It is located within the Bergamo Alps.
