= Monte Madonnino =

Mountain in Italy

Coordinates: 46°00′42″N 9°53′10″E

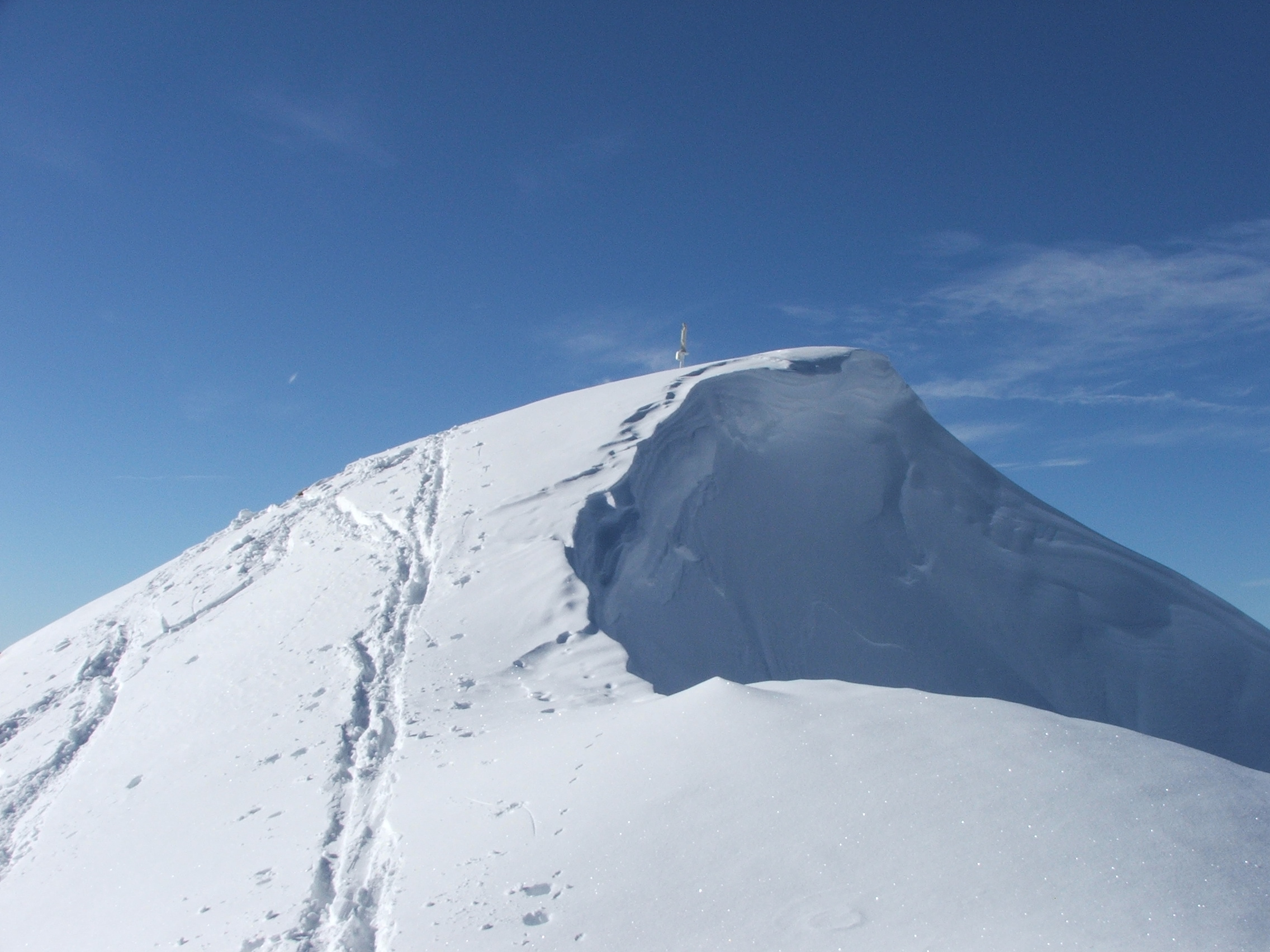

Highest point
- Elevation: 2,502 m (8,209 ft)

Geography
- Location: Lombardy, Italy
- Parent range: Bergamo Alps

Monte Madonnino is a mountain of Lombardy, Italy. It is located within the Bergamo Alps. There is a rifugio nearby to Monte Madonnino.
