= Pizzo del Diavolo della Malgina =

Mountain of Lombardy, Italy

Coordinates: 46°05′05″N 10°02′48″E

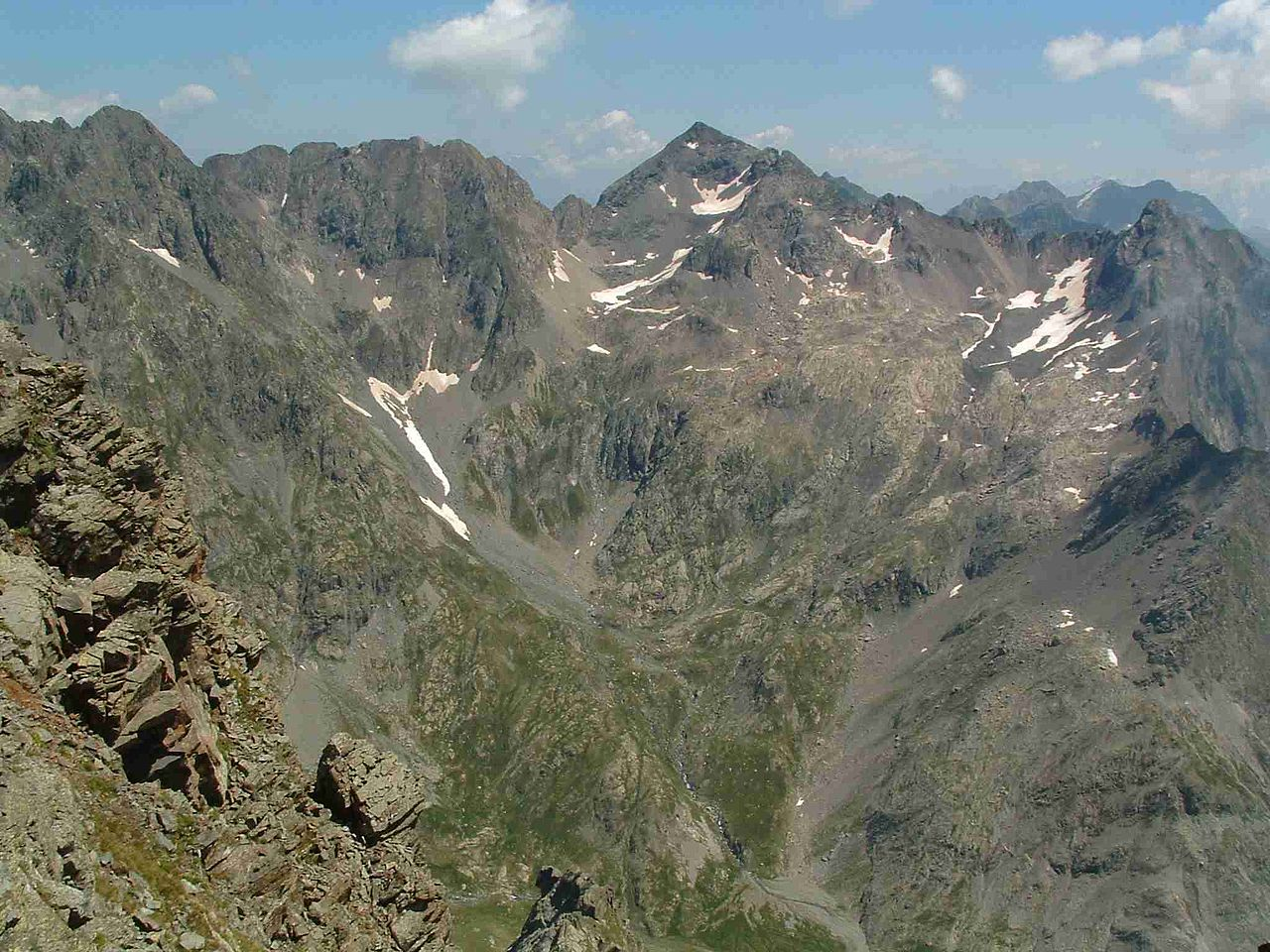

Highest point
- Elevation: 2,924 m (9,593 ft)

Geography
- Location: Lombardy, Italy
- Parent range: Bergamo Alps

Pizzo del Diavolo della Malgina is a mountain of Lombardy, Italy. It is located within the Bergamo Alps.
