= Monte Venerocolo =

Mountain in Italy

Coordinates: 46°03′26″N 10°10′09″E

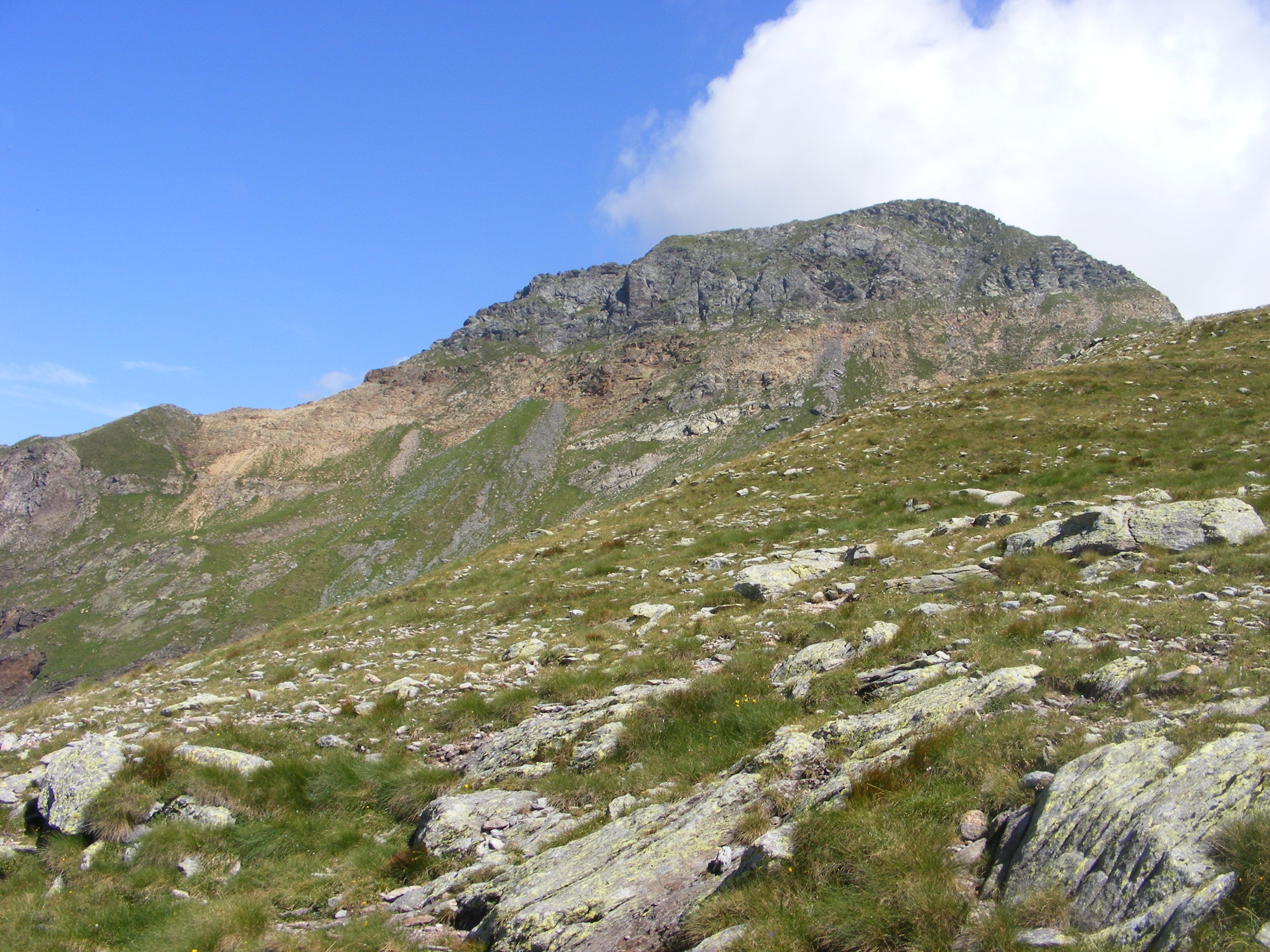

Highest point
- Elevation: 2,590 m (8,500 ft)

Geography
- Location: Lombardy, Italy
- Parent range: Bergamo Alps

Monte Venerocolo is a mountain of Lombardy, Italy. It is located within the Bergamo Alps.
