= Monte Farno =

Mountain in Italy

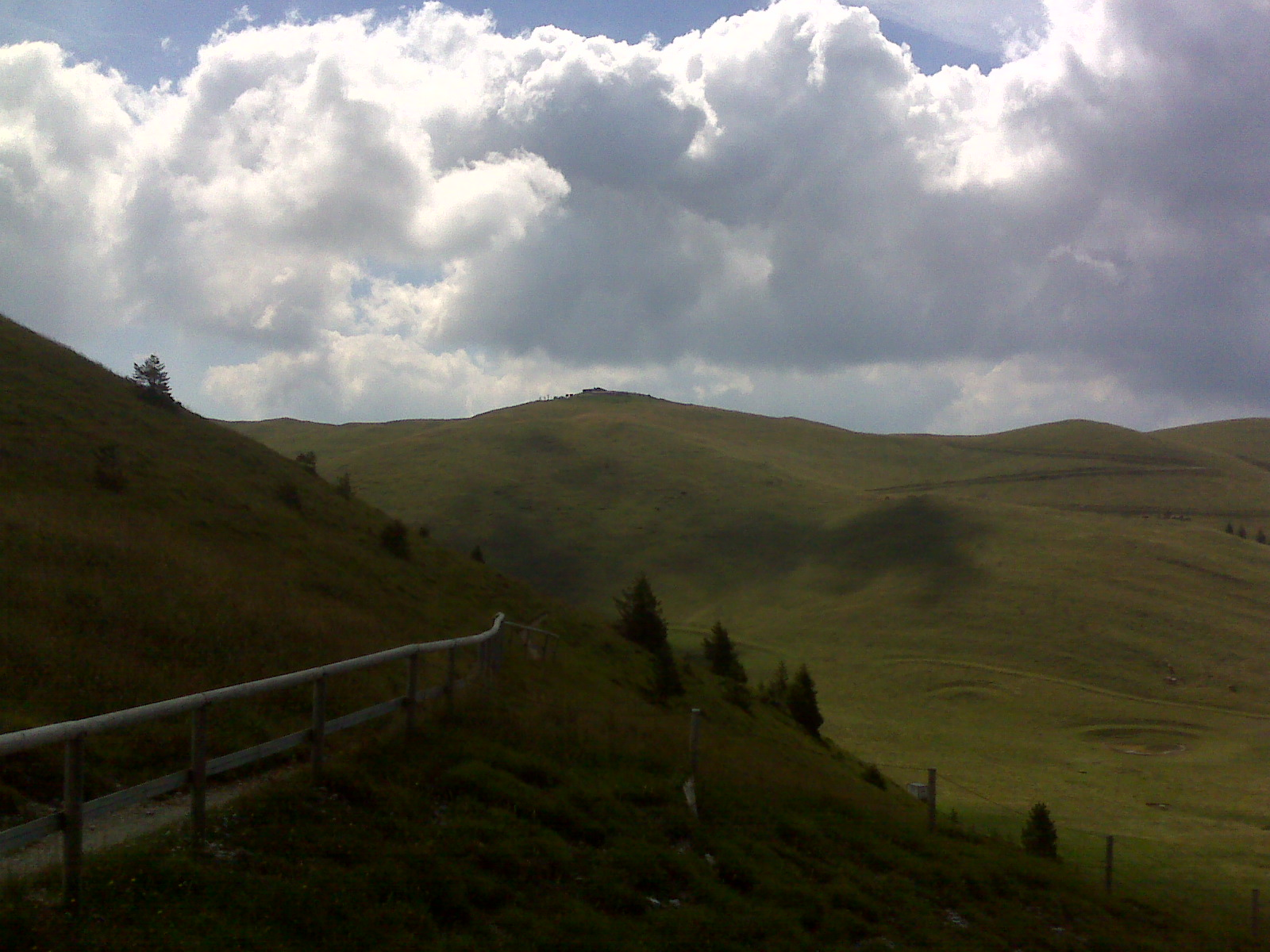

Highest point
- Elevation: 1,250 m (4,100 ft)
- Coordinates: 45°49′47″N 9°53′47″E

Geography
- Location within Italy
- Location: Lombardy, Italy
- Parent range: Bergamo Alps

Monte Farno is a mountain of Lombardy, Italy. It is located within the Bergamo Alps.
