= Corno Guazza =

Mountain in Italy

Coordinates: 45°51′13″N 9°54′02″E

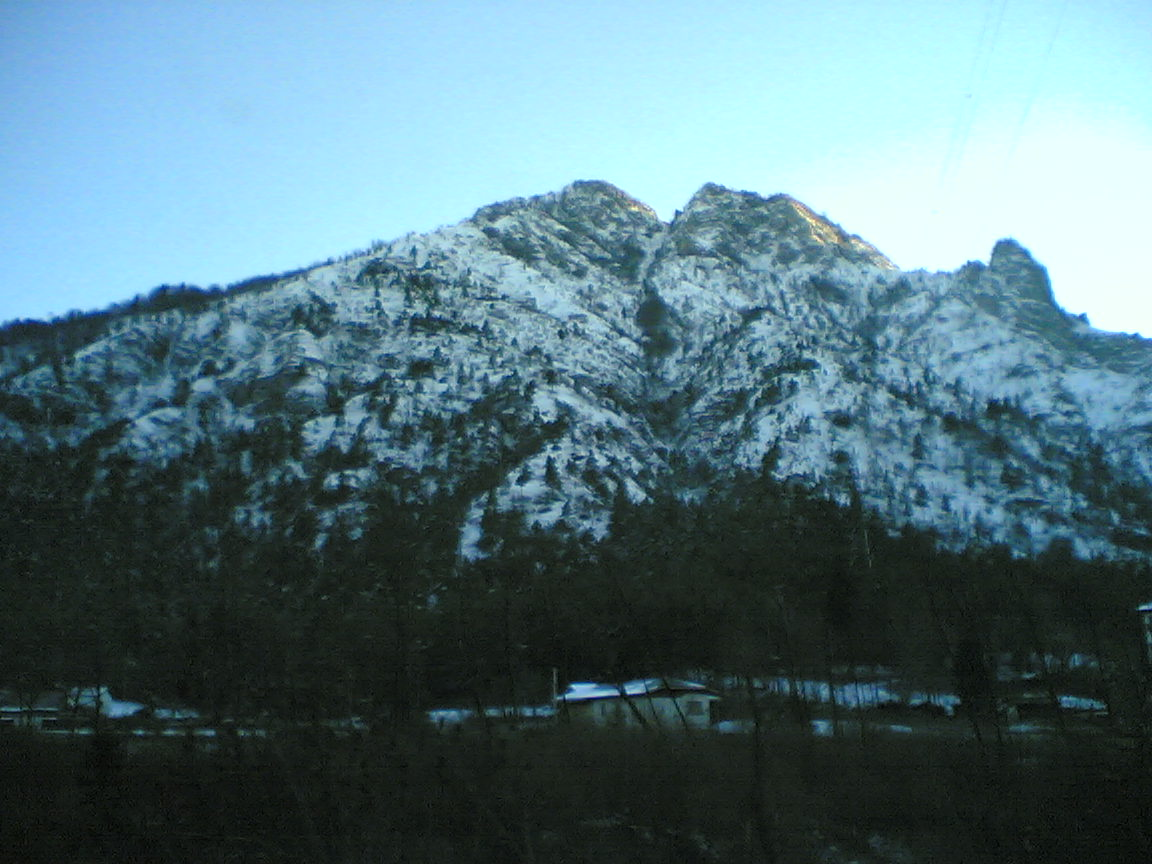
- Corno Guazza (left) and Corno Falò, from Ponte Nossa

Highest point
- Elevation: 1,270 m (4,170 ft)

Geography
- Location: Lombardy, Italy
- Parent range: Bergamo Alps

Corno Guazza is a mountain of Lombardy, Italy. It is located within the Bergamo Alps.

The elevation is reached from the town of Ponte Nossa, following a particularly steep slope, to the top of Corno Falò, from where, w the main peak of Corno Guazza can be reached. The elevation top provides a wide view of the mountains of the upper Seriana Valley: the nearby Pizzo Frol (1,050 m), a mountain that was the subject of a campaign to introduce mouflon by the province of Bergamo during 2002-2003.
