= Monte Pegherolo =

Mountain in Italy

Coordinates: 46°01′29″N 9°42′46″E

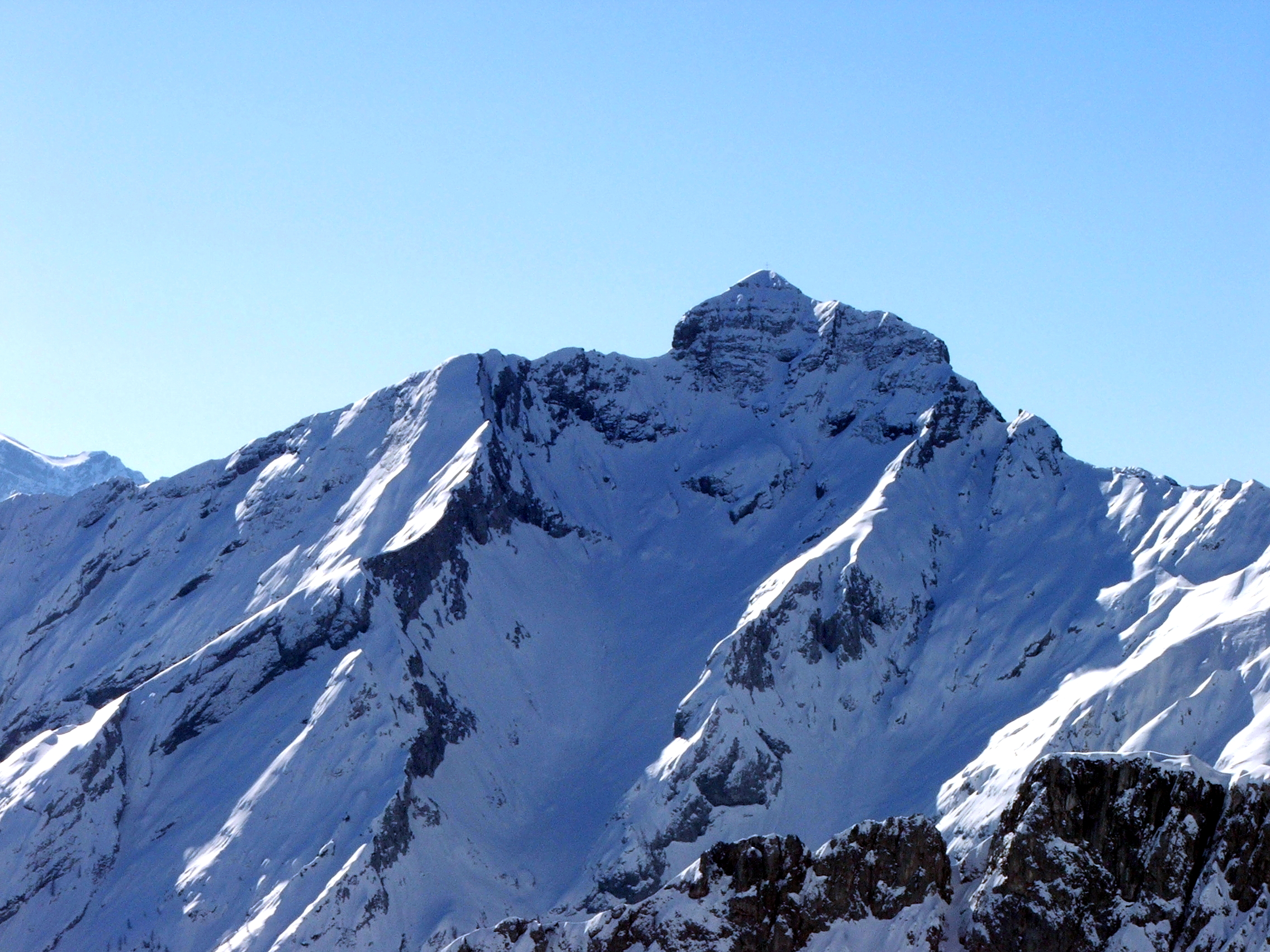

Highest point
- Elevation: 2,369 m (7,772 ft)

Geography
- Location: Lombardy, Italy
- Parent range: Bergamo Alps

Monte Pegherolo is a mountain of Lombardy, Italy. It is located within the Bergamo Alps, and is 2,369 meters high. Hiking is a popular pastime on this mountain.
