= Monte Gleno =

Mountain in Italy

Coordinates: 46°01′55″N 10°03′16″E

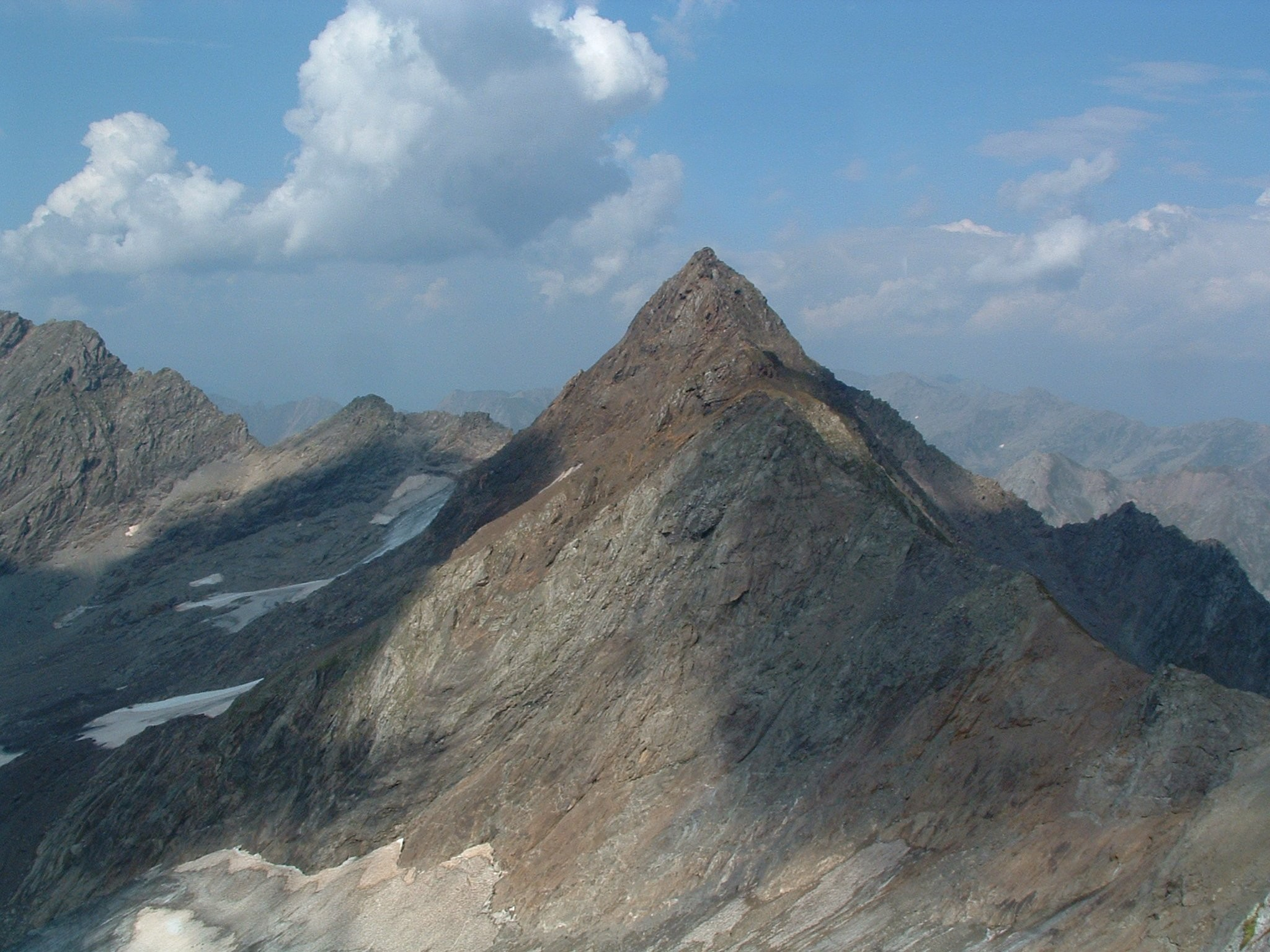

Highest point
- Elevation: 2,882 m (9,455 ft)

Geography
- Location: Lombardy, Italy
- Parent range: Bergamo Alps

Monte Gleno is a mountain of Lombardy, Italy. It is located within the Bergamo Alps.
