= Monte Chierico =

Mountain in Italy

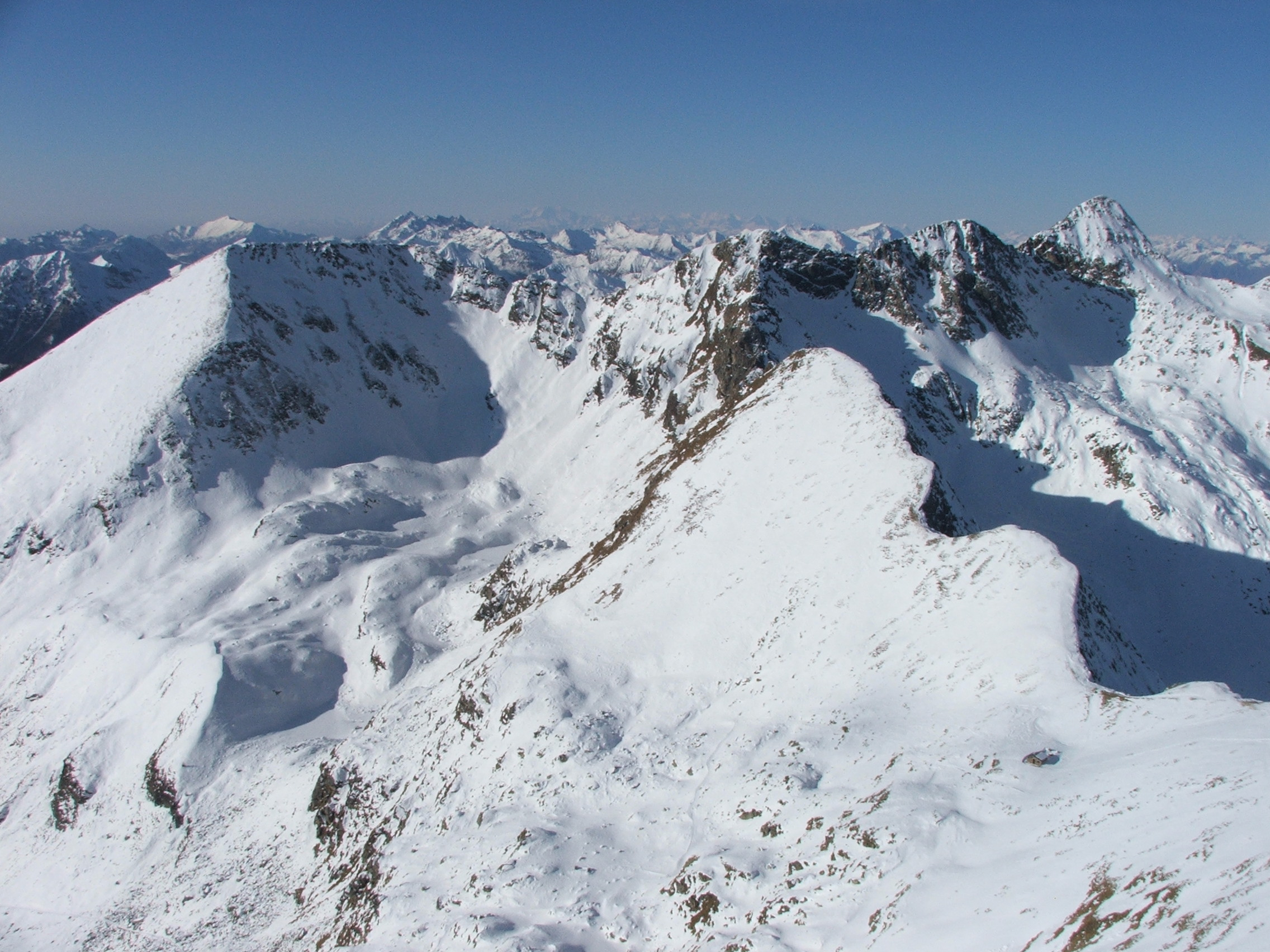

Highest point
- Elevation: 2,535 m (8,317 ft)
- Coordinates: 46°02′42″N 9°48′31″E

Geography
- Location within Italy
- Location: Lombardy, Italy
- Parent range: Bergamo Alps

Monte Chierico is a mountain of Lombardy, Italy. It is located within the Bergamo Alps. Hiking is popular at the lower elevations, especially below 2,535 metres on Monte Chierico, out of Carona.

== See also ==
- Mountaineering
