= Monte Grabiasca =

Mountain in Italy

Coordinates: 46°02′03″N 9°54′19″E

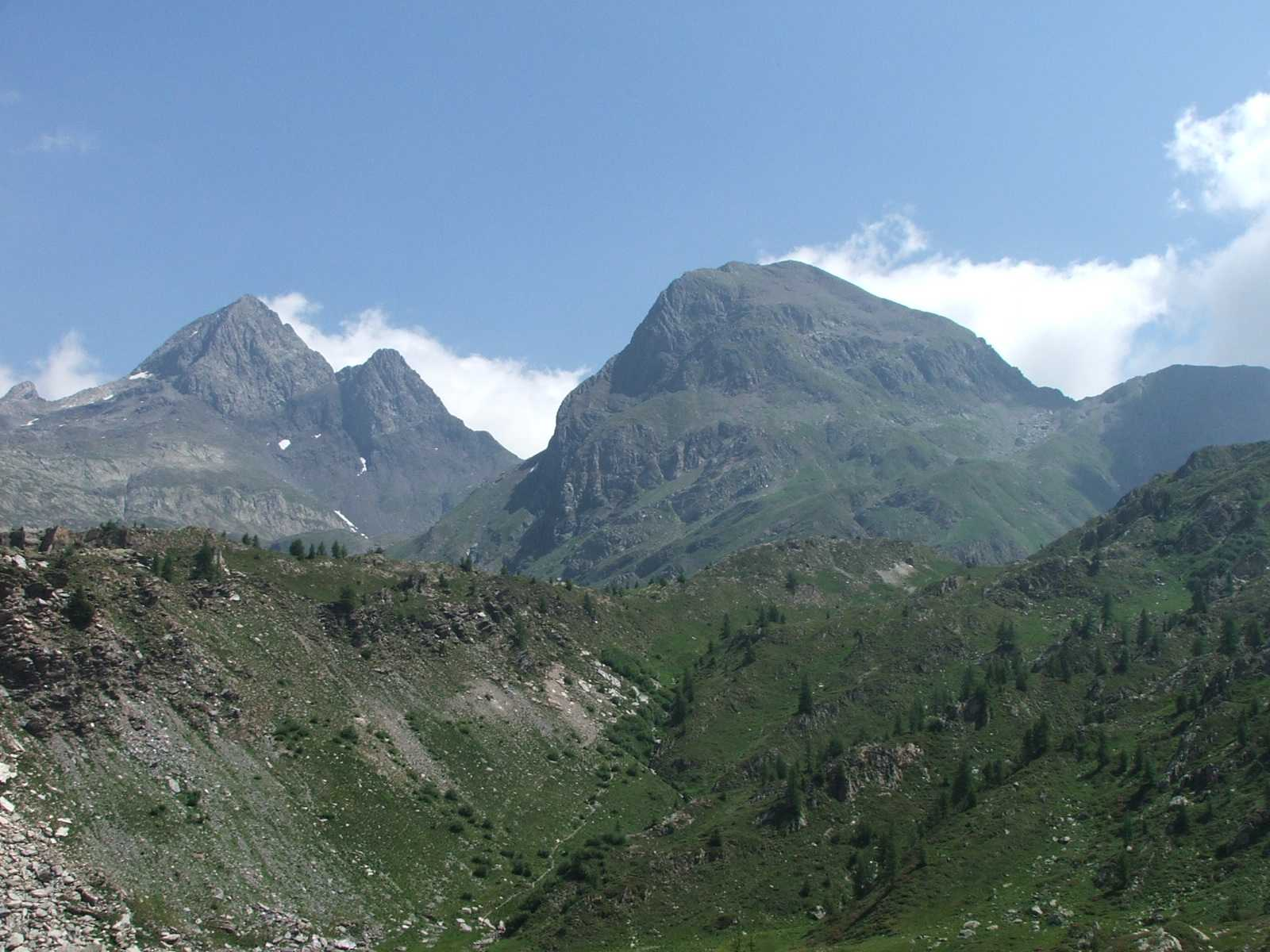
- Monte Grabiasca (right)

Highest point
- Elevation: 2,705 m (8,875 ft)

Geography
- Location: Lombardy, Italy
- Parent range: Bergamo Alps

Monte Grabiasca is a mountain of Lombardy, Italy. It is located within the Bergamo Alps. It has been a hiking destination for over a century. There is a rifugio nearby to Monte Grabiasca.
