= Monte Cornagera =

Mountain in Italy

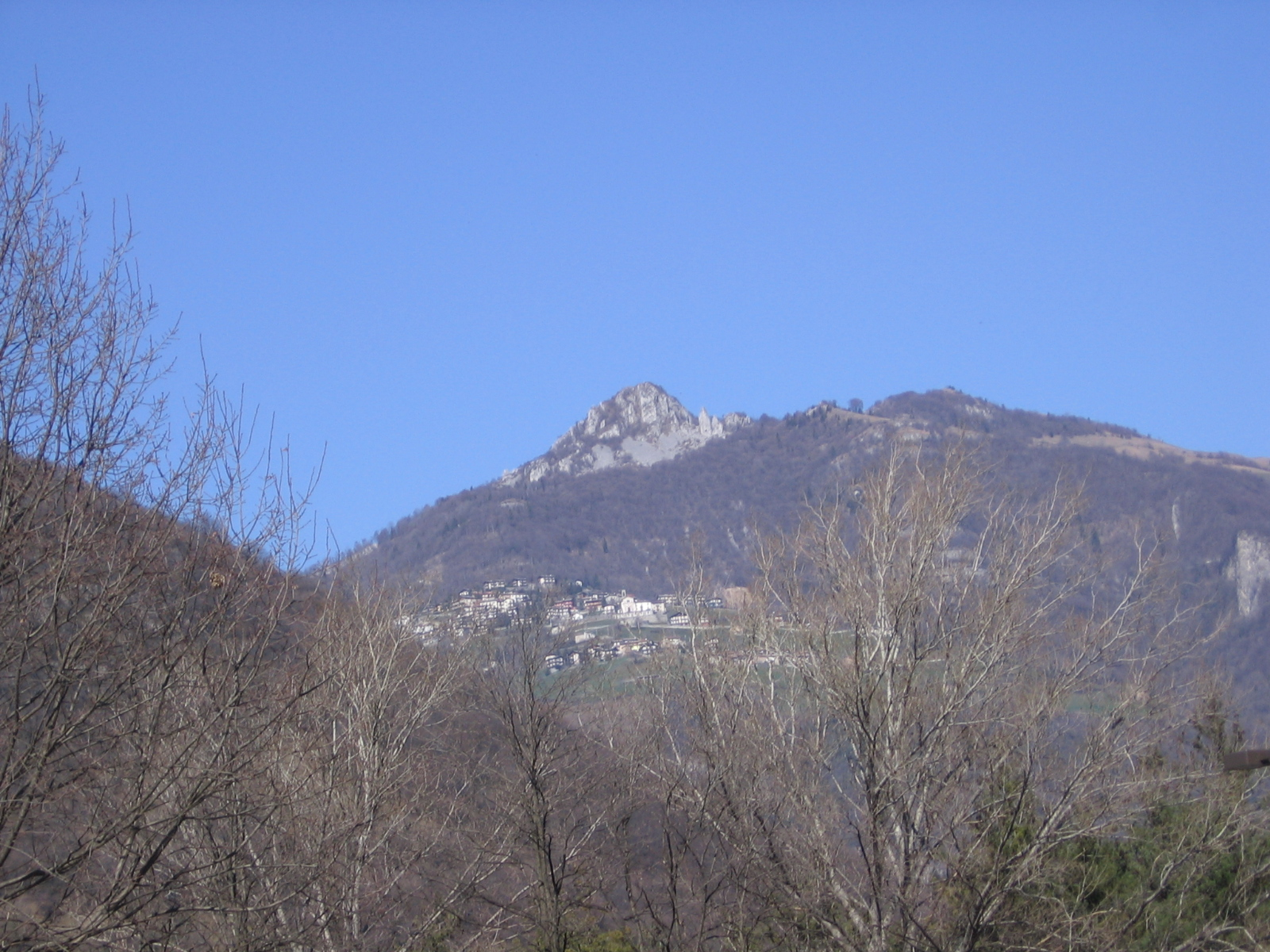

Highest point
- Elevation: 1,312 m (4,304 ft)
- Coordinates: 45°47′39″N 9°46′52″E

Geography
- Location within Italy
- Location: Lombardy, Italy
- Parent range: Bergamo Alps

Monte Cornagera is a mountain in Lombardy, Italy, within the Bergamo Alps.
