= Monte Cavallo (Orobie) =

Mountain in Italy

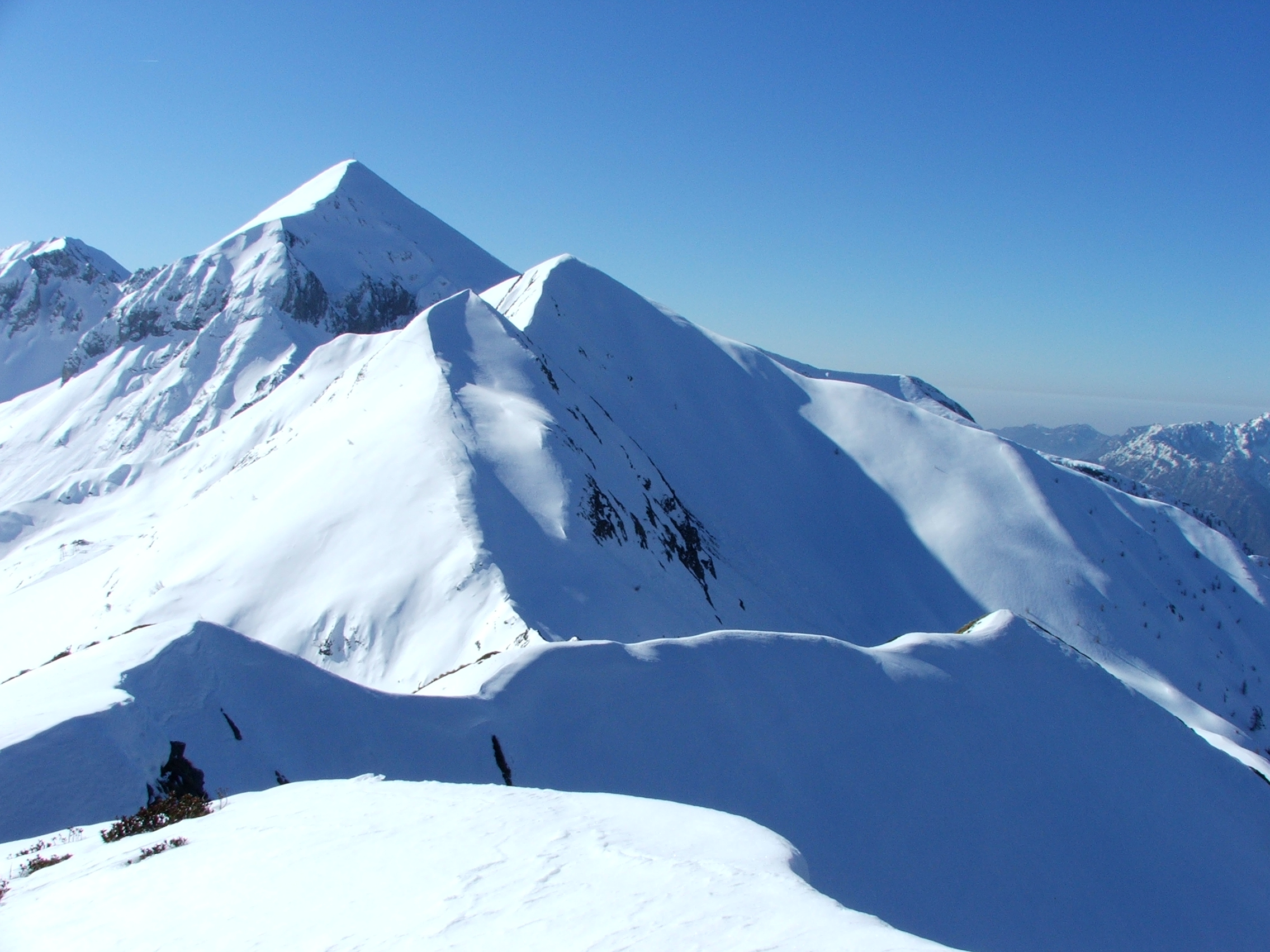

Highest point
- Elevation: 2,323 m (7,621 ft)
- Coordinates: 46°02′05″N 9°41′26″E

Geography
- Location within Italy
- Location: Lombardy, Italy
- Parent range: Bergamo Alps

Monte Cavallo is a mountain of Lombardy, Italy. It is located within the Bergamo Alps.
