= Monte Avaro =

Mountain in Italy

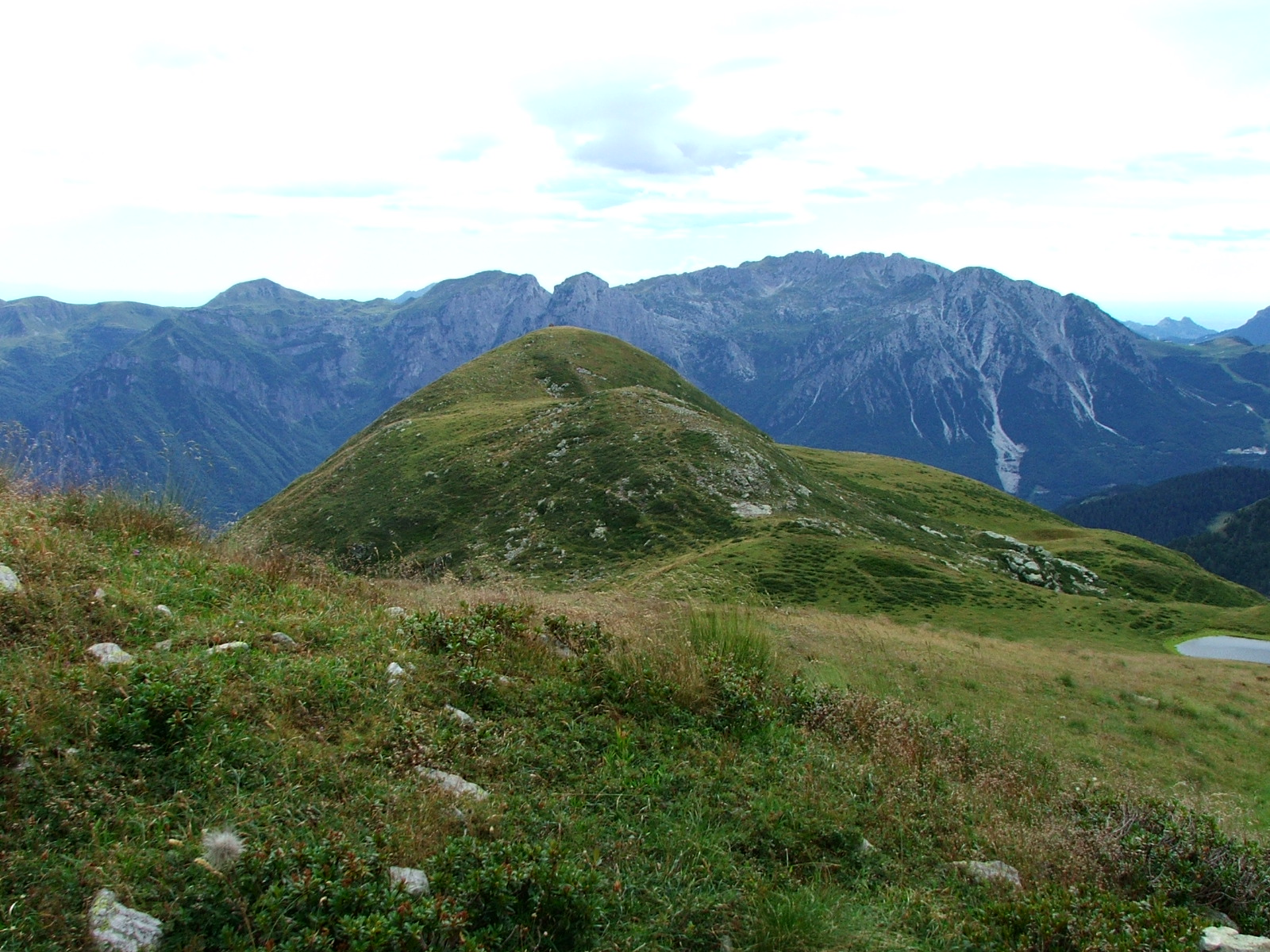

Highest point
- Elevation: 2,088 m (6,850 ft)
- Coordinates: 46°01′00″N 9°35′18″E

Geography
- Location within Italy
- Country: Italy
- Region: Lombardy
- Province: Bergamo
- Parent range: Bergamo Alps

Monte Avaro is a mountain located within the Bergamo Alps of Lombardy, Italy. It is located in the upper Val Brembana in the province of Bergamo.
