= Monte Triomen =

Mountain in Italy

Coordinates: 46°01′13″N 9°35′33″E

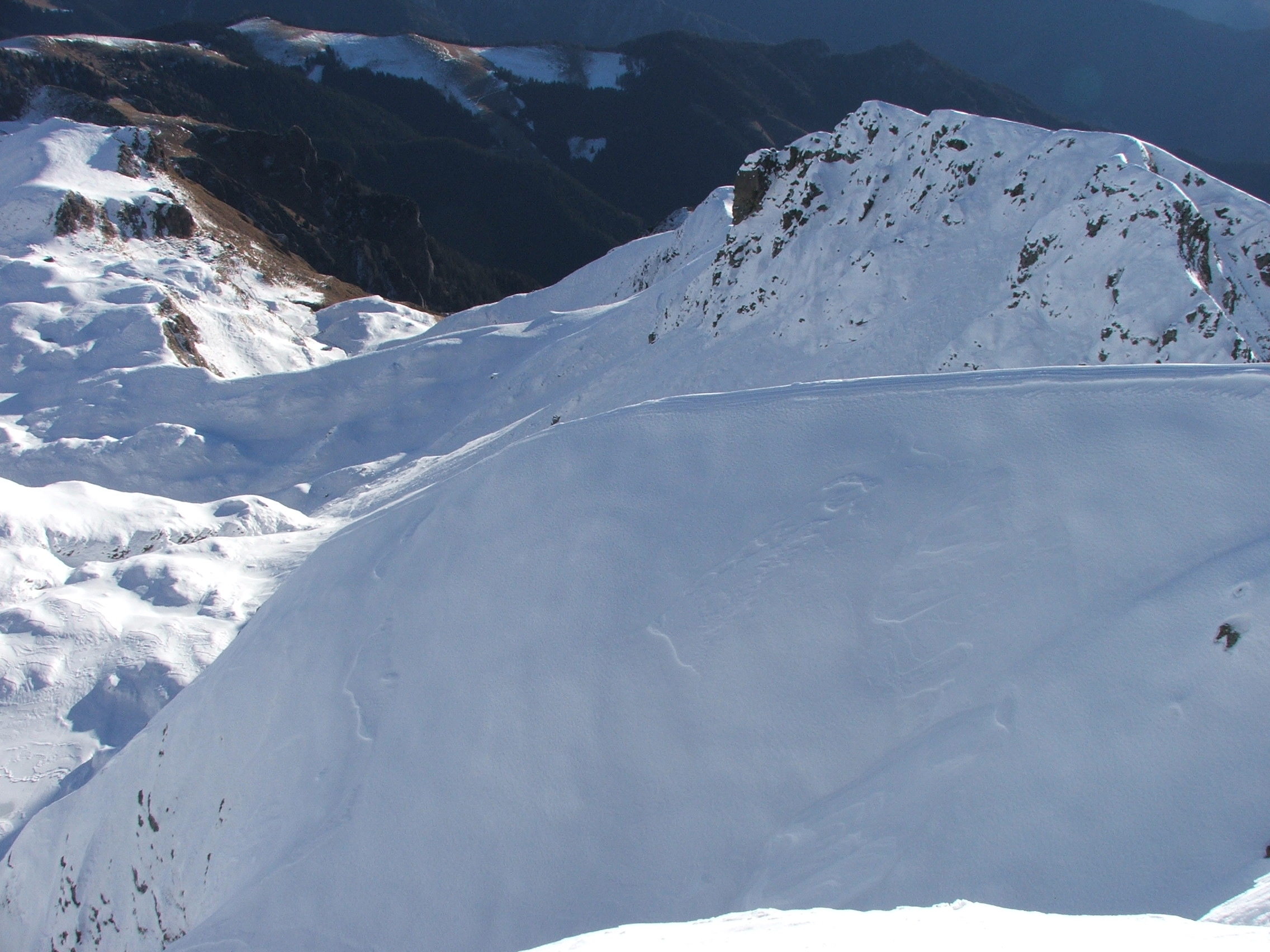

Highest point
- Elevation: 2,251 m (7,385 ft)

Geography
- Location: Lombardy, Italy
- Parent range: Bergamo Alps

Monte Triomen is a mountain of Lombardy, Italy. It is located within the Bergamo Alps. It is a popular destination for skiing and mountain hiking.
