= Dente di Coca =

Mountain in Italy

Coordinates: 46°04′26″N 10°00′05″E

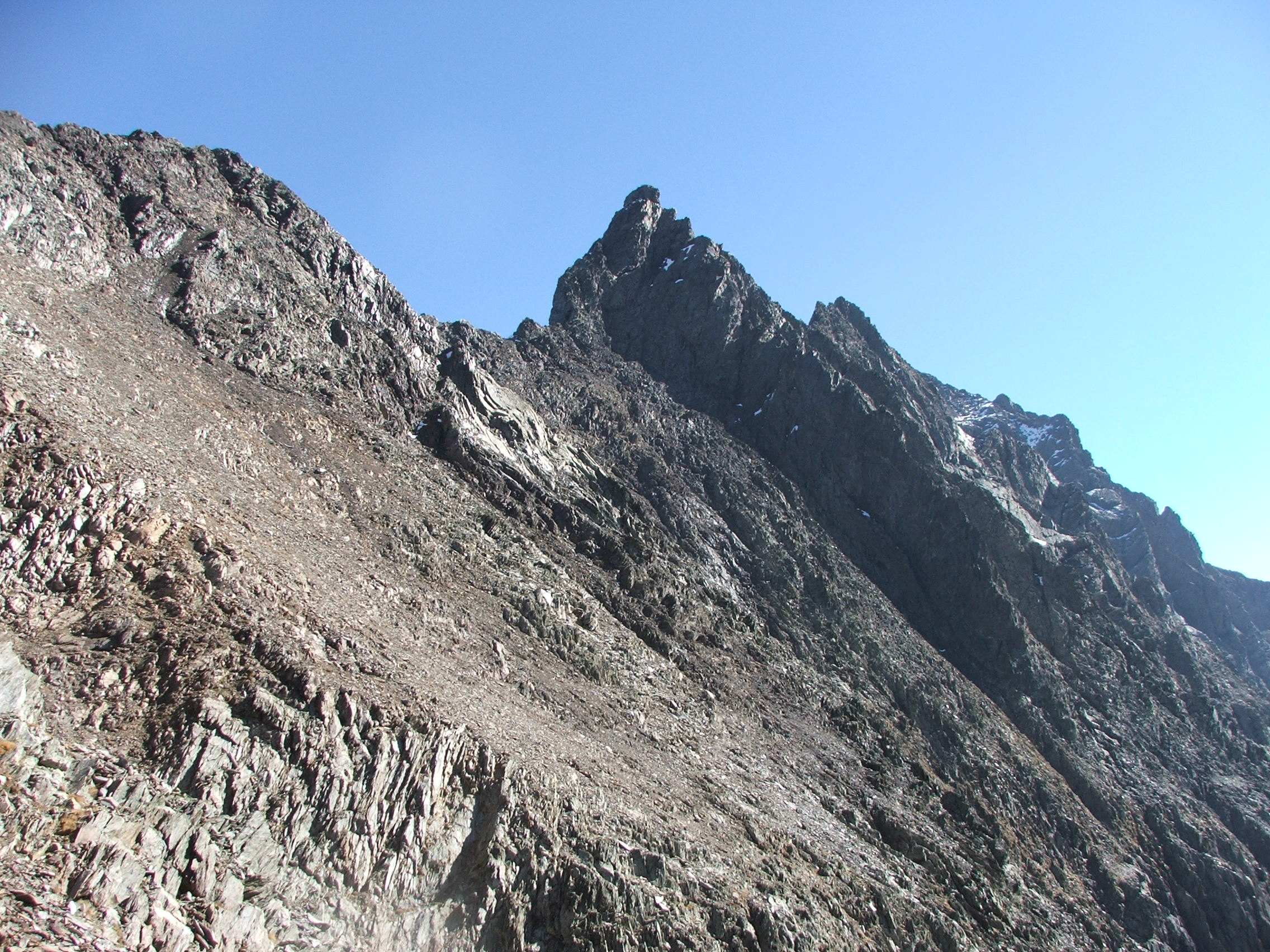

Highest point
- Elevation: 2,924 m (9,593 ft)

Geography
- Location: Lombardy, Italy
- Parent range: Bergamo Alps

Dente di Coca is a mountain of Lombardy, Italy. It is located within the Bergamo Alps.
