= Cime di Caronella =

Mountain in Italy

Coordinates: 46°05′26″N 10°05′26″E

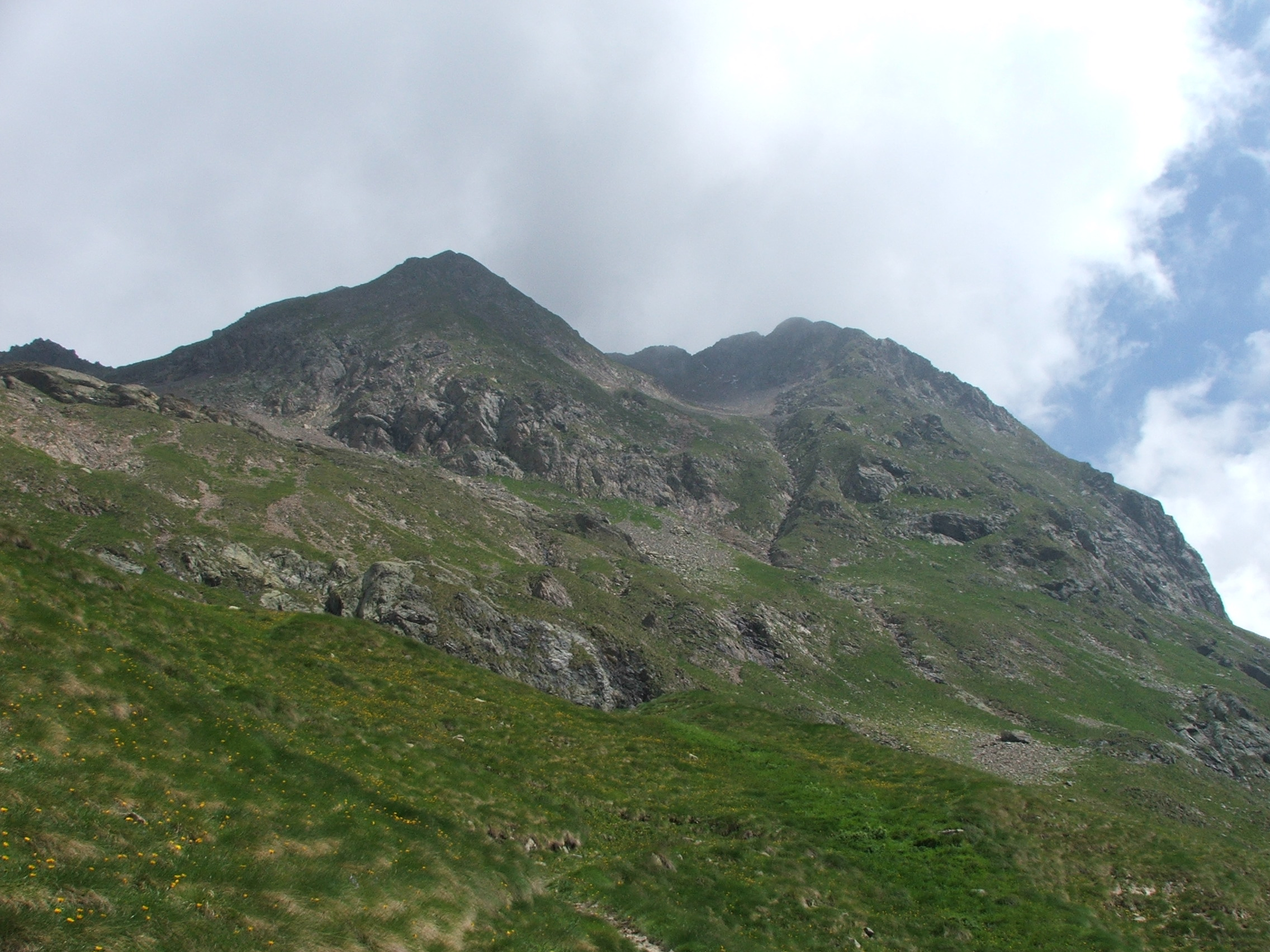

Highest point
- Elevation: 2,871 m (9,419 ft)

Geography
- Location: Lombardy, Italy
- Parent range: Bergamo Alps

Cime di Caronella is a mountain of Lombardy, Italy. It is located within the Bergamo Alps.
