= Corno Stella =

Mountain in Italy

Coordinates: 46°03′14″N 9°48′26″E

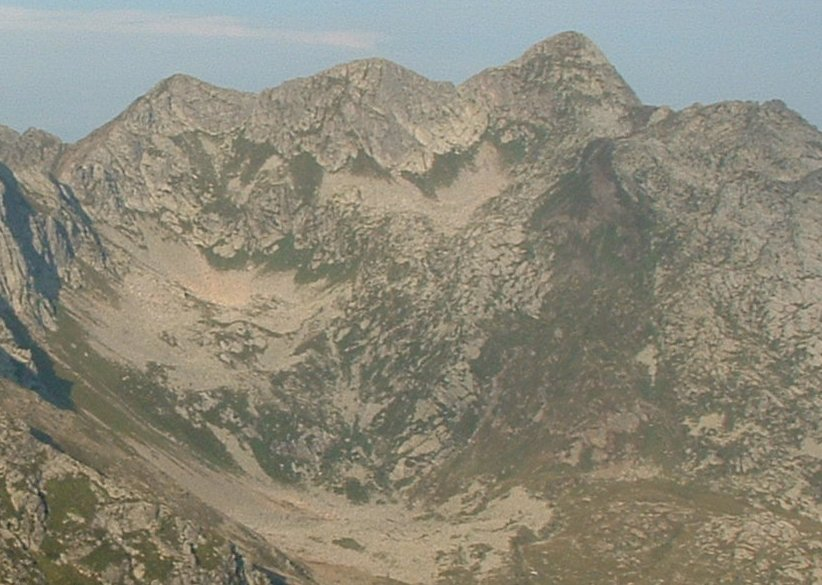

Highest point
- Elevation: 2,620 m (8,600 ft)
- Prominence: 253 m (830 ft)

Geography
- Location: Lombardy, Italy
- Parent range: Bergamo Alps

Corno Stella is a mountain of Lombardy, Italy. It is located within the Bergamo Alps. Hiking is a popular activity, and there is a rifugio on the lower slopes, open during the summer, which includes hot showers.
