= Pizzo Farno =

Mountain in Italy

Coordinates: 45°59′21″N 9°49′35″E

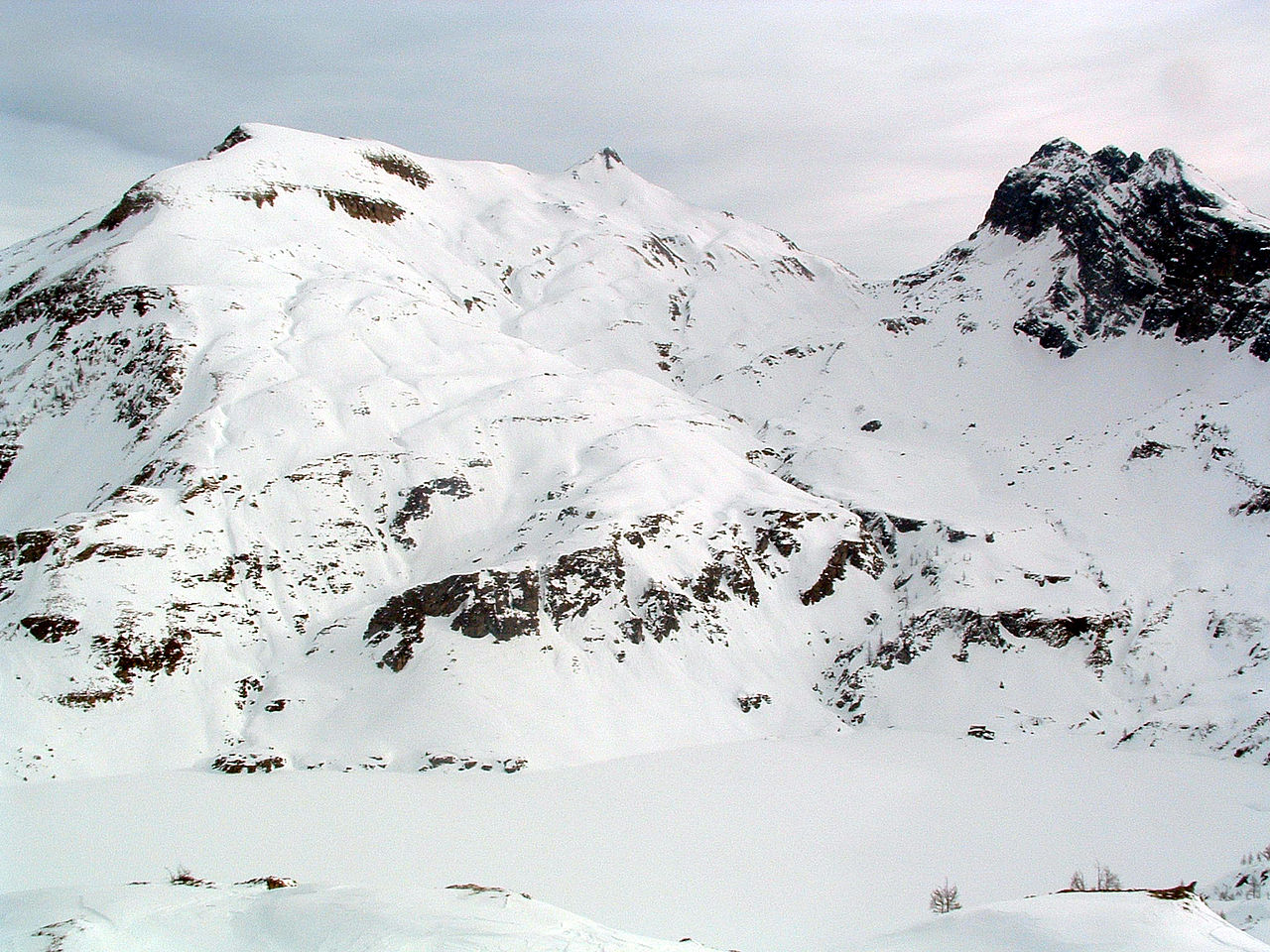

Highest point
- Elevation: 2,506 m (8,222 ft)

Geography
- Location: Lombardy, Italy
- Parent range: Bergamo Alps

Pizzo Farno is a mountain of Lombardy, Italy. It is located within the Bergamo Alps. There is hiking, a rifugio, a hostel, and camping.
