= Monte Masoni =

Mountain in Italy

Coordinates: 46°02′38″N 9°50′18″E

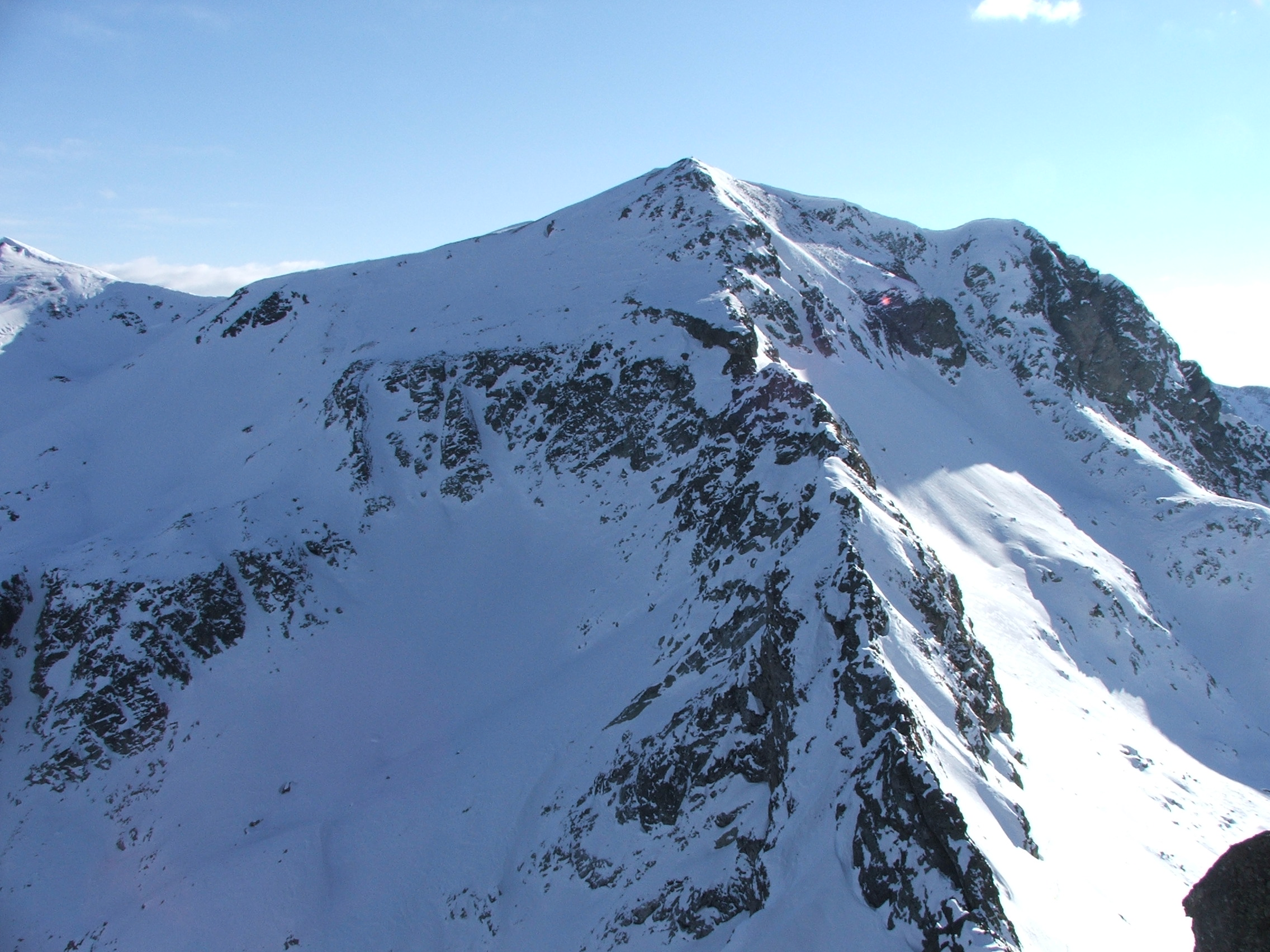

Highest point
- Elevation: 2,663 m (8,737 ft)

Geography
- Location: Lombardy, Italy
- Parent range: Bergamo Alps

Monte Masoni is a mountain of Lombardy, Italy. It is located within the Bergamo Alps. The mountain is 2,663 metres above sea level.
