= Punta Scais =

Mountain in Italy

Coordinates: 46°04′N 9°59′E

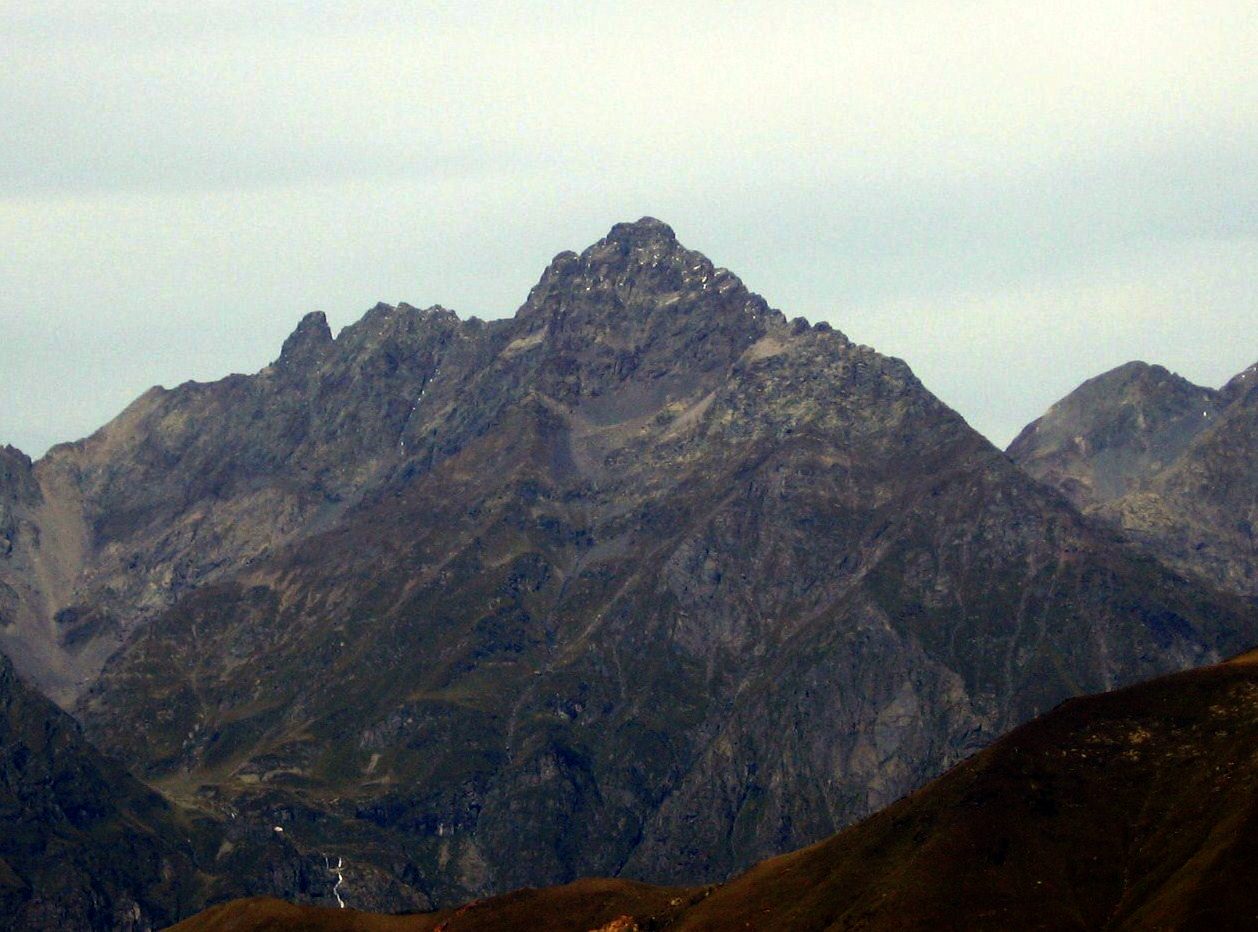

Highest point
- Elevation: 3,040 m (9,970 ft)
- Prominence: 393 m (1,289 ft)
- Listing: Alpine mountains above 3000 m

Geography
- Location: Lombardy, Italy
- Parent range: Bergamo Alps

Punta Scais is a mountain of Lombardy, Italy. It is located in the Bergamo Alps.
