= Bergamasque Alps =

Mountain range in the Italian Alps

- Bergamo Alps
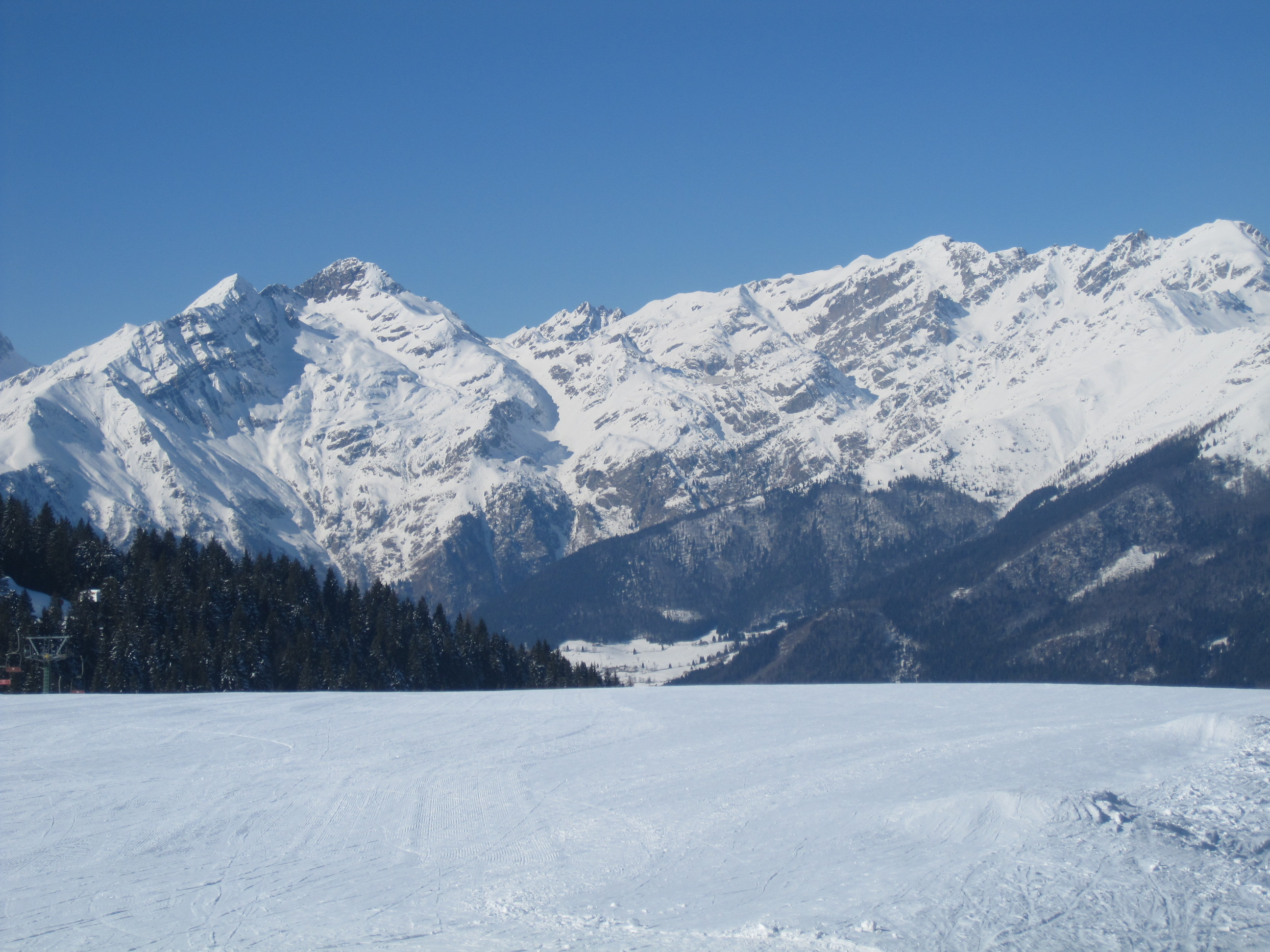
- Orobie Alps in winter

Highest point
- Peak: Pizzo di Coca
- Elevation: 3,050 m (10,010 ft)

Naming
- Native name: Alpi Orobie (Italian)

Geography
- Country: Italy
- Provinces: Bergamo; Brescia; Lecco
- Region: Lombardy
- Range coordinates: 46°4′7″N 10°0′42″E
- Parent range: Bergamasque Alps and Prealps
- Borders on: Bregaglia Range; Bernina Range; Ortler Alps; Adamello-Presanella; Bergamasque Prealps

Geology
- Orogeny: Alpine orogeny
- Rock types: Igneous rock; Sedimentary rocks

The Bergamasque Alps or Bergamo Alps (Italian: Alpi Orobie; sometimes translated into English as Orobic Alps) are a mountain range in the Italian Alps. They are located in northern Lombardy and named after the city Bergamo, south of the mountains. Within the Eastern Alps, the Alpine Club or AVE system places them within the Western Limestone Alps, while the SOIUSA system classifies them within the Southeastern Alps.

== Peaks ==
The main peaks of the Bergamasque Alps are:

Peak	Elevation	
Peak	(m)	(ft)
Pizzo di Coca	3,050	10,010
Pizzo di Scais	3,040	9,974
Pizzo Redorta	3,037	9,964
Pizzo Porola	2,981	9,780
Dente di Coca	2,924	9,593
Pizzo del Diavolo della Malgina	2,924	9,593
Pizzo del Diavolo di Tenda	2,915	9,564
Monte Torena	2,911	9,551
Pizzo Recastello	2,888	9,475
Cime di Caronella	2,871	9,419
Monte Gleno	2,883	9,459
Pizzo Strinato	2,836	9,304
Pizzo di Rodes	2,829	9,281
Pizzo dei Tre Confini	2,824	9,265
Monte Grabiasca	2,705	8,875
Monte Masoni	2,663	8,737
Corno Stella	2,620	8,596
Monte Legnone	2,610	8,563
Monte Venerocolo	2,590	8,500
Pizzo dei Tre Signori	2,554	8,380
Monte Chierico	2,535	8,317
Pizzo del Becco	2,507	8,225
Pizzo Farno	2,506	8,222
Monte Madonnino	2,502	8,209
Monte Ponteranica	2,378	7,802
Monte Pegherolo	2,369	7,772
Cime di Lemma	2,348	7,703
Monte Cavallo	2,323	7,621
Monte Triomen	2,251	7,385
Pizzo Rotondo	2,237	7,339
Monte Avaro	2,088	6,850
Monte Cornagera	1,312	4,304
Corno Guazza	1,270	4,170
Monte Farno	1,250	4,100

== Passes ==
The main mountain passes of the Bergamasque Alps are:

Pass	Location	Type	Elevation (m/ft)	
Passo di Val Morta or del Diavolo	Valle Seriana to Sondrio	footpath	2,601	8,534
Passo di Venina	Valle Brembana to Sondrio	footpath	2,433	7,983
Passo del Serio	Valle Seriana to Sondrio	footpath	2,419	7937
Passo del Venerocolo	Val di Scalve to Aprica	bridle path	2,315	7,595
Passo di Dordona	Valle Brembana to Sondrio	footpath	2,080	6,824
Passo San Marco	Bergamo to Morbegno	road	1,985	6,513
Passo del Vivione	Val di Scalve to Edolo	road	1,819	5,968
Aprica Pass	Edolo to Sondrio	road	1,181	3,875
Passo di Tartano	Valleve to Tartano	footpath	2,108	6,425

== Gallery ==
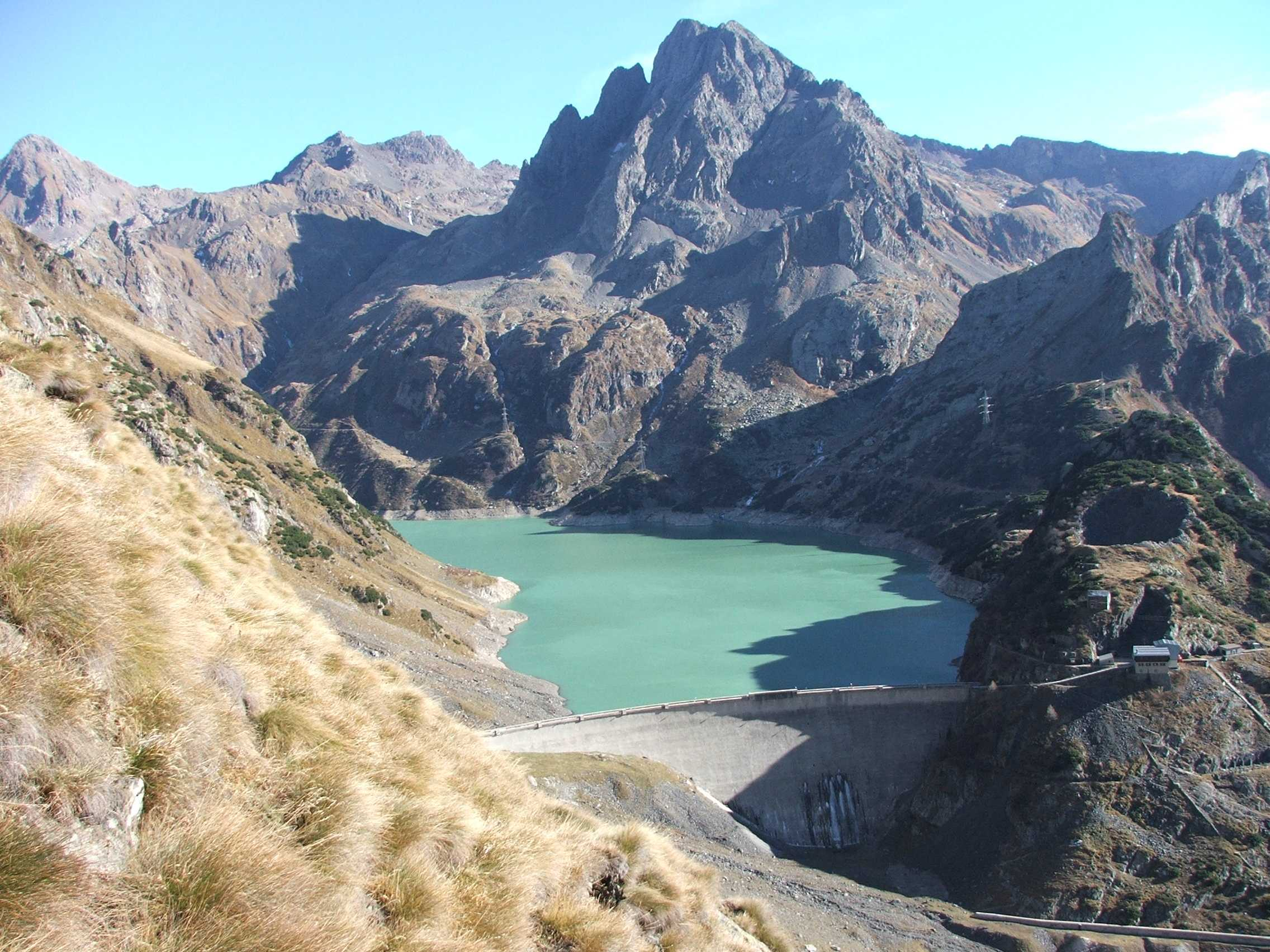
Barbellino Lake

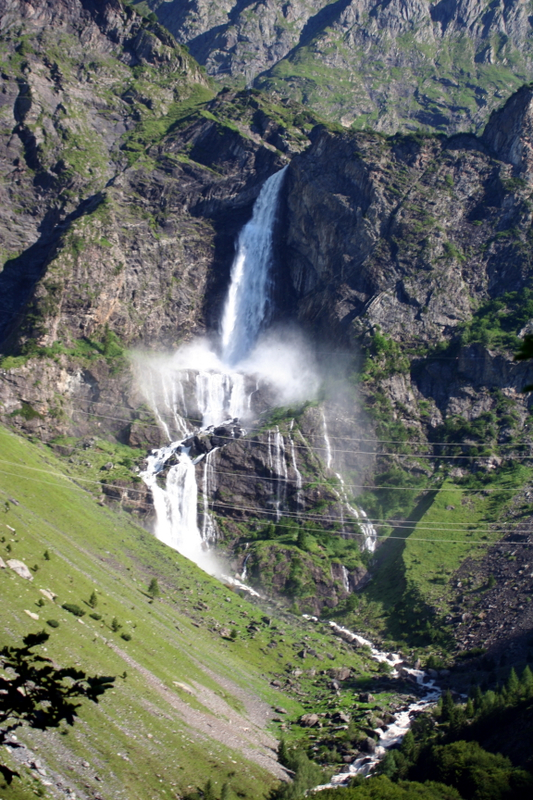
Serio Falls

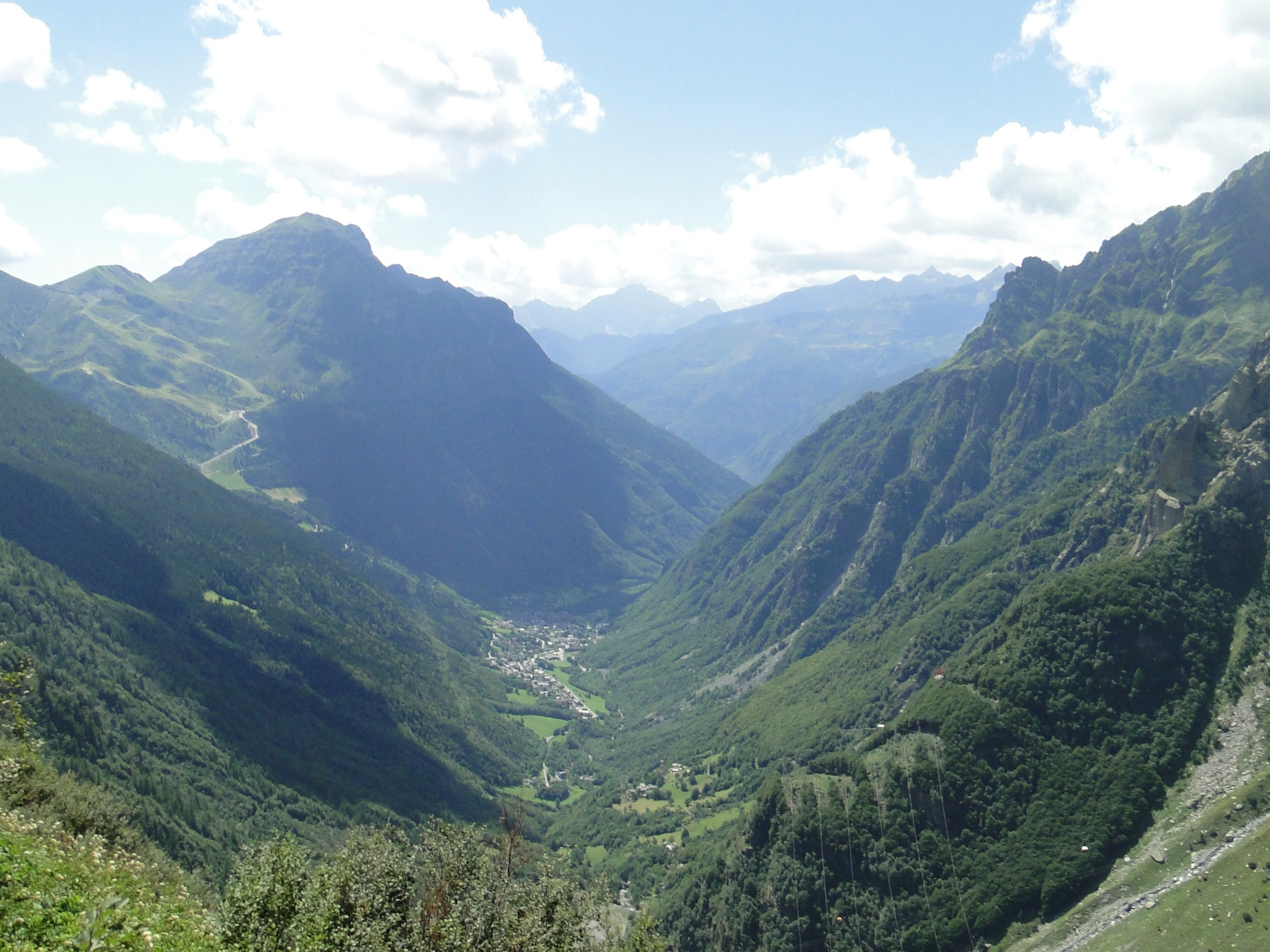
Valbondione, in the Park of the Bergamo Orobic Alps

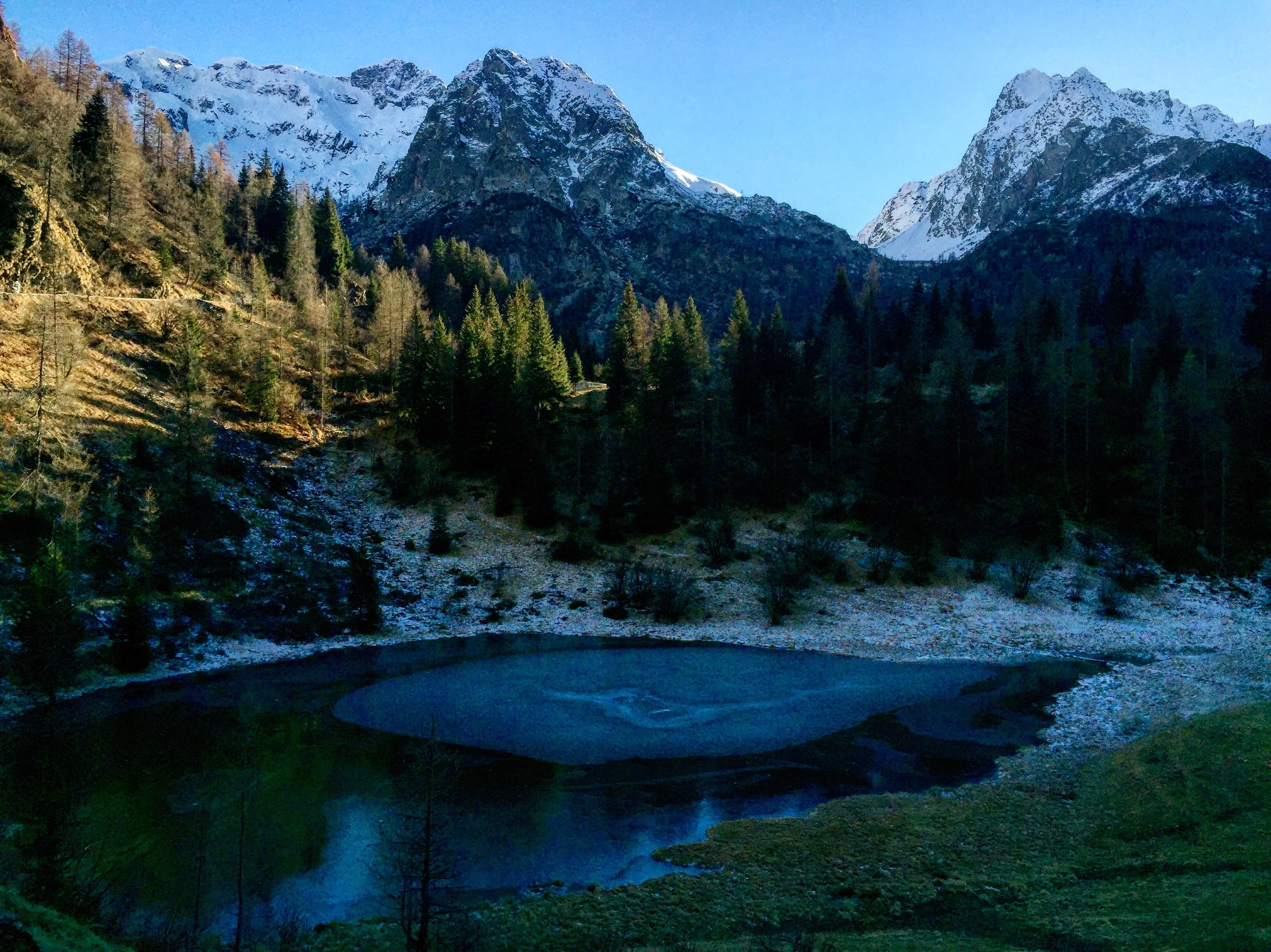
Prà de'Lac

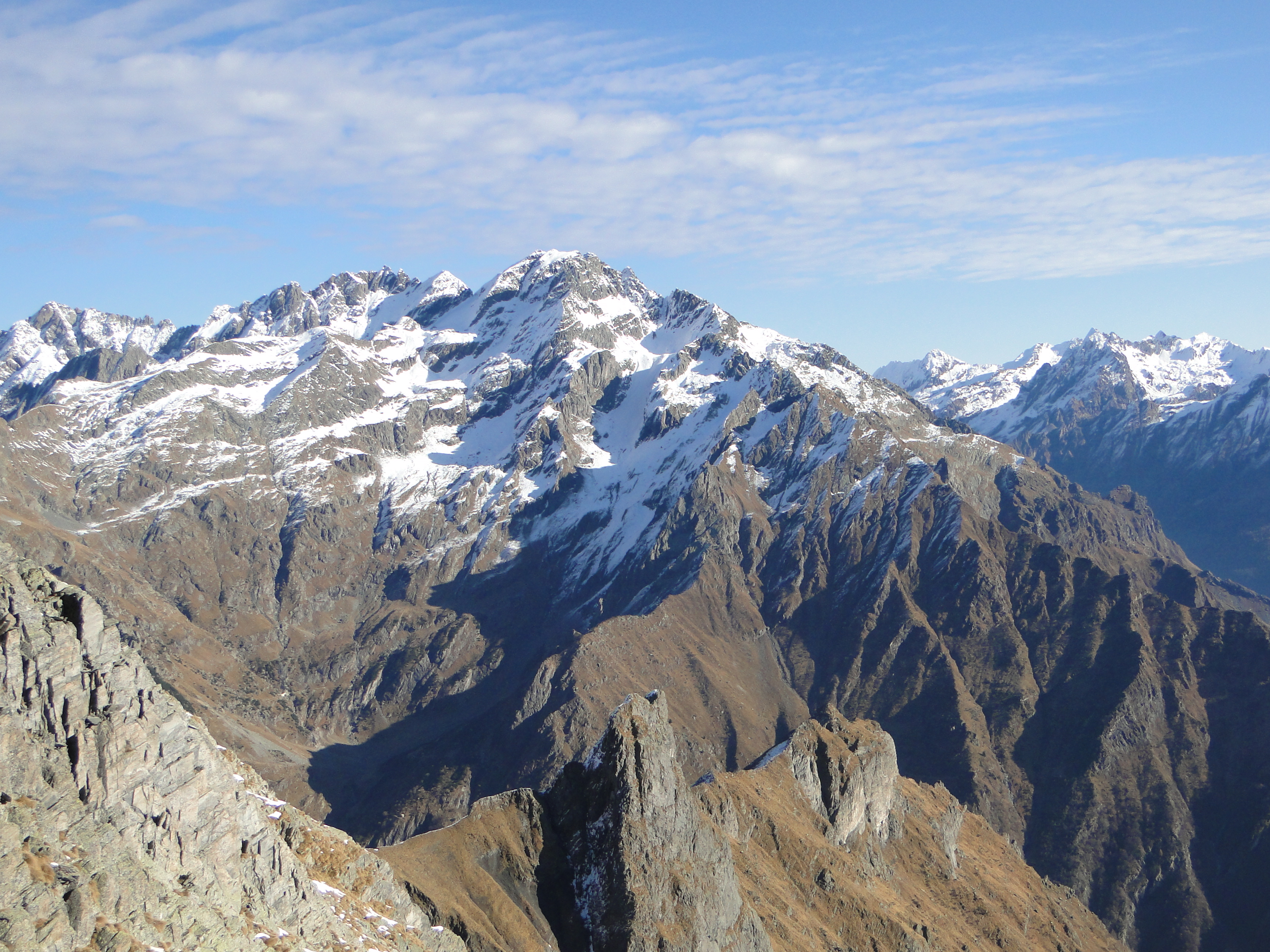
Redorta

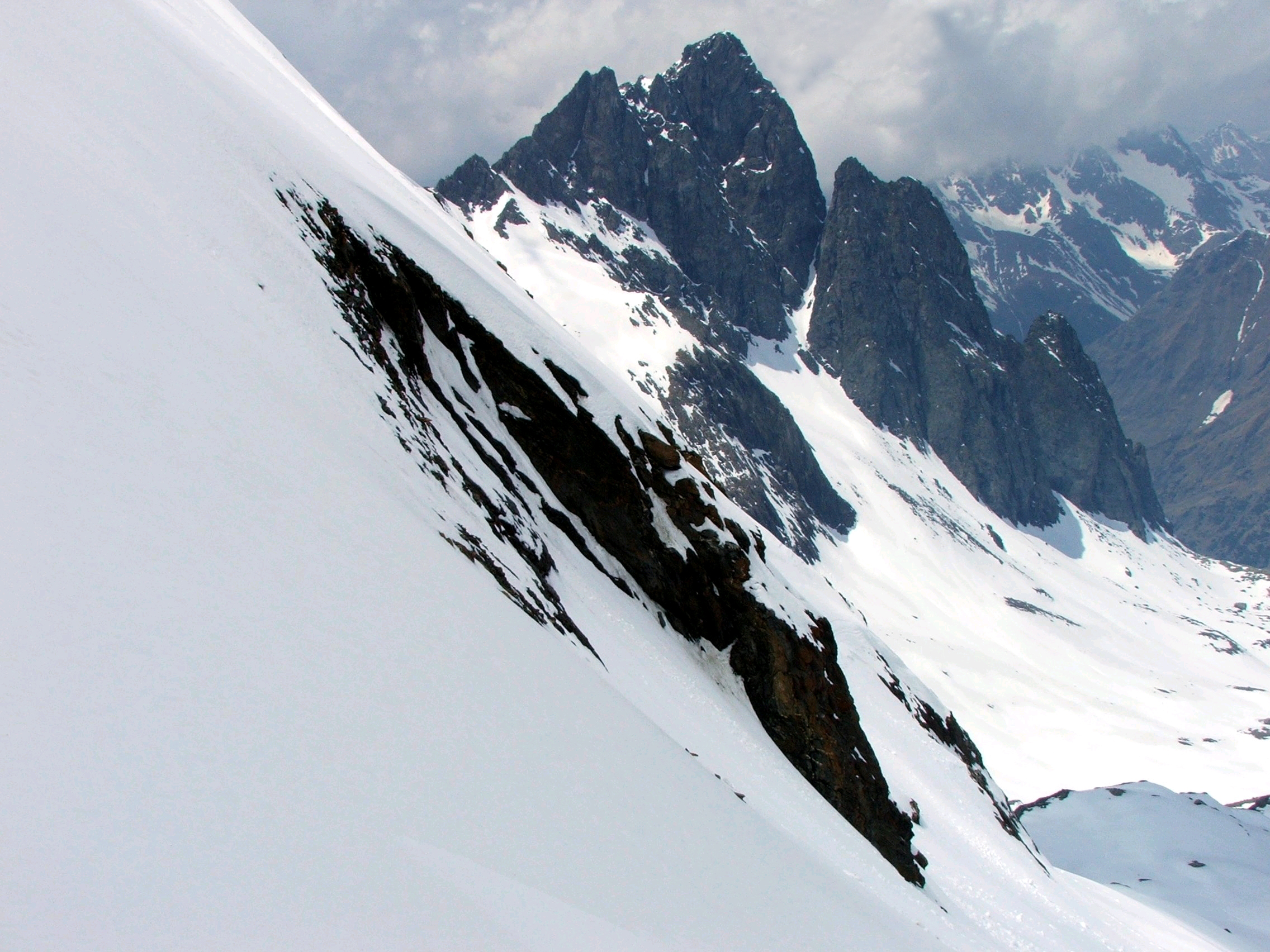
Recastello

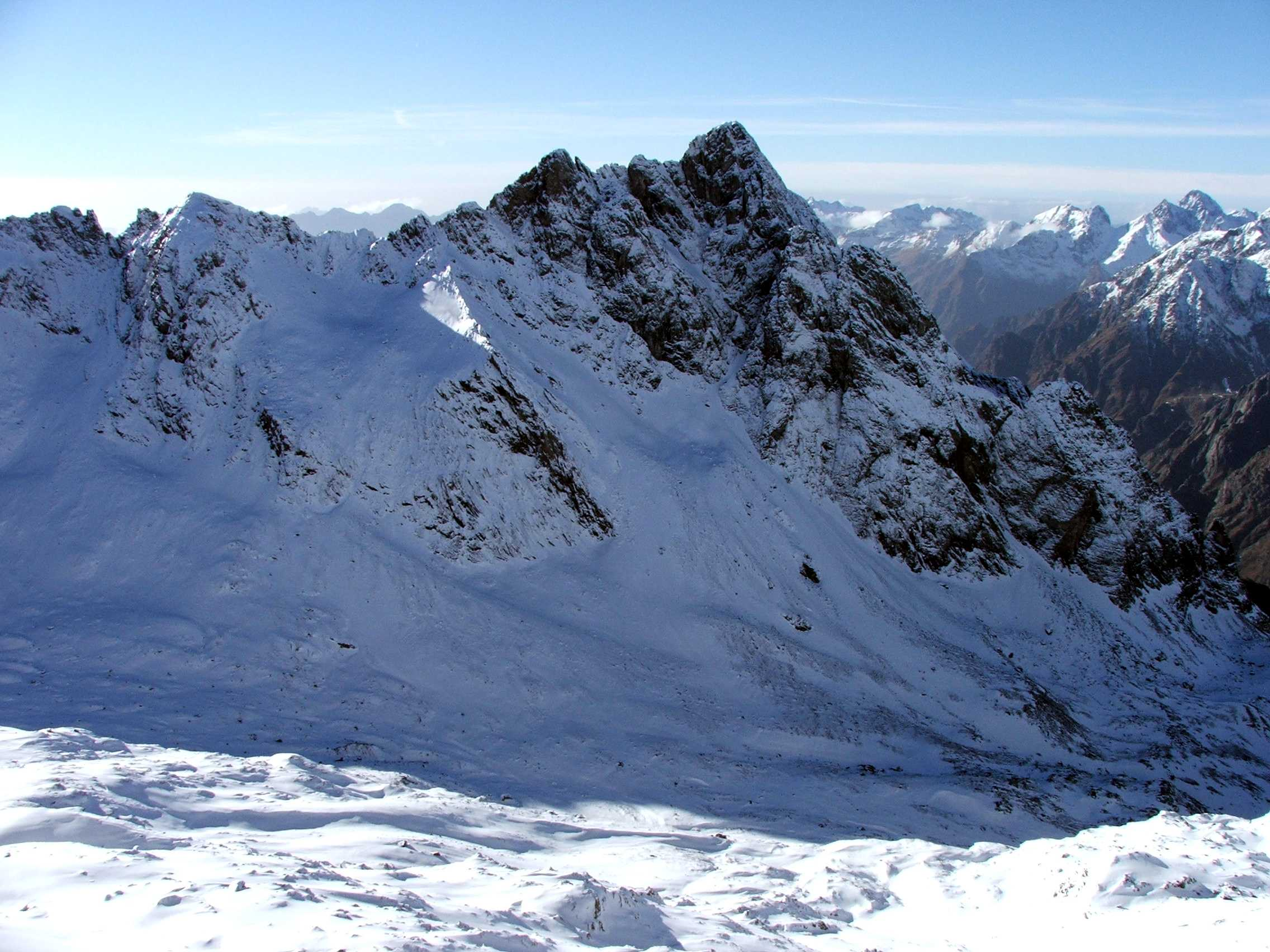
Recastello

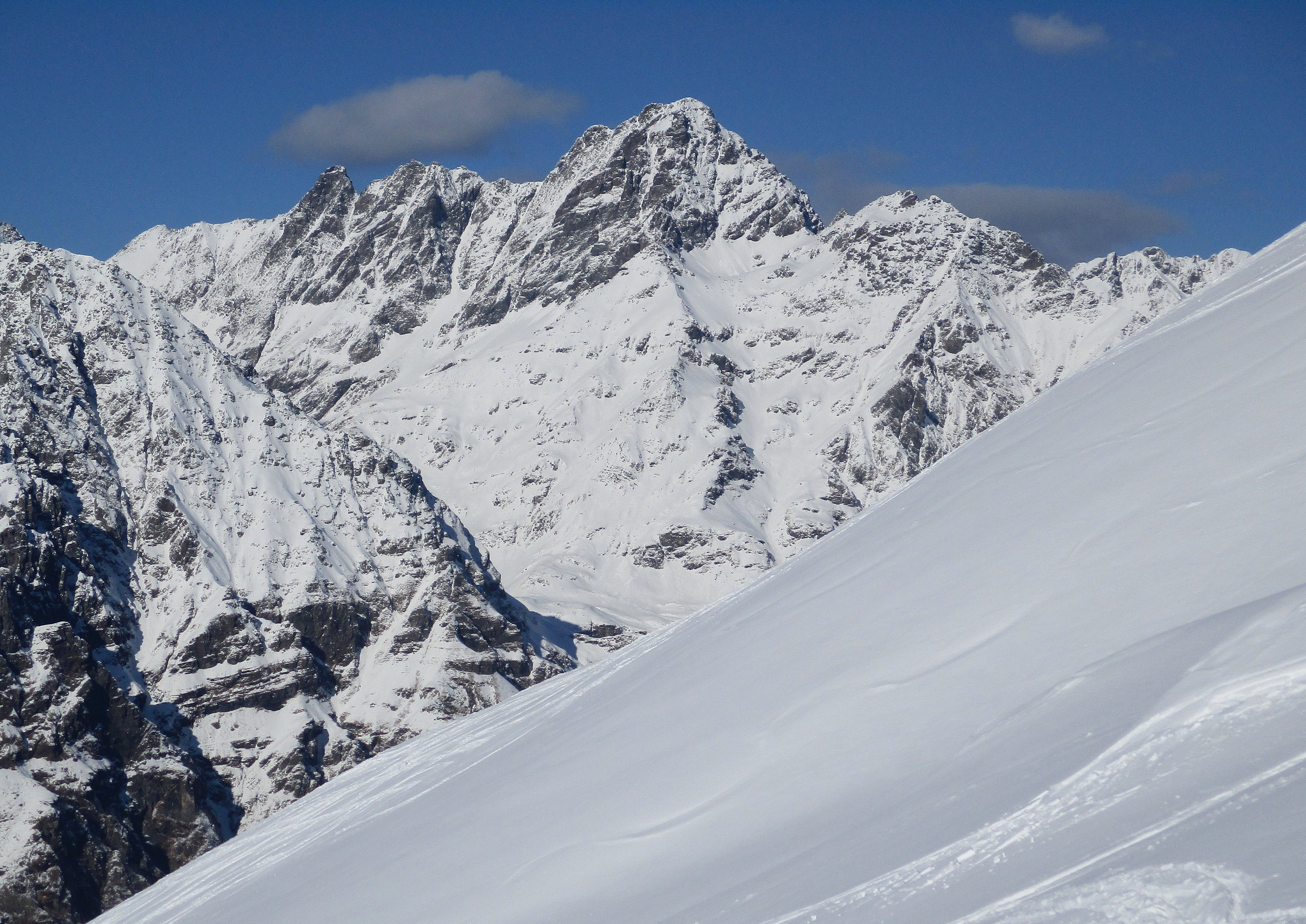
Pizzo Coca

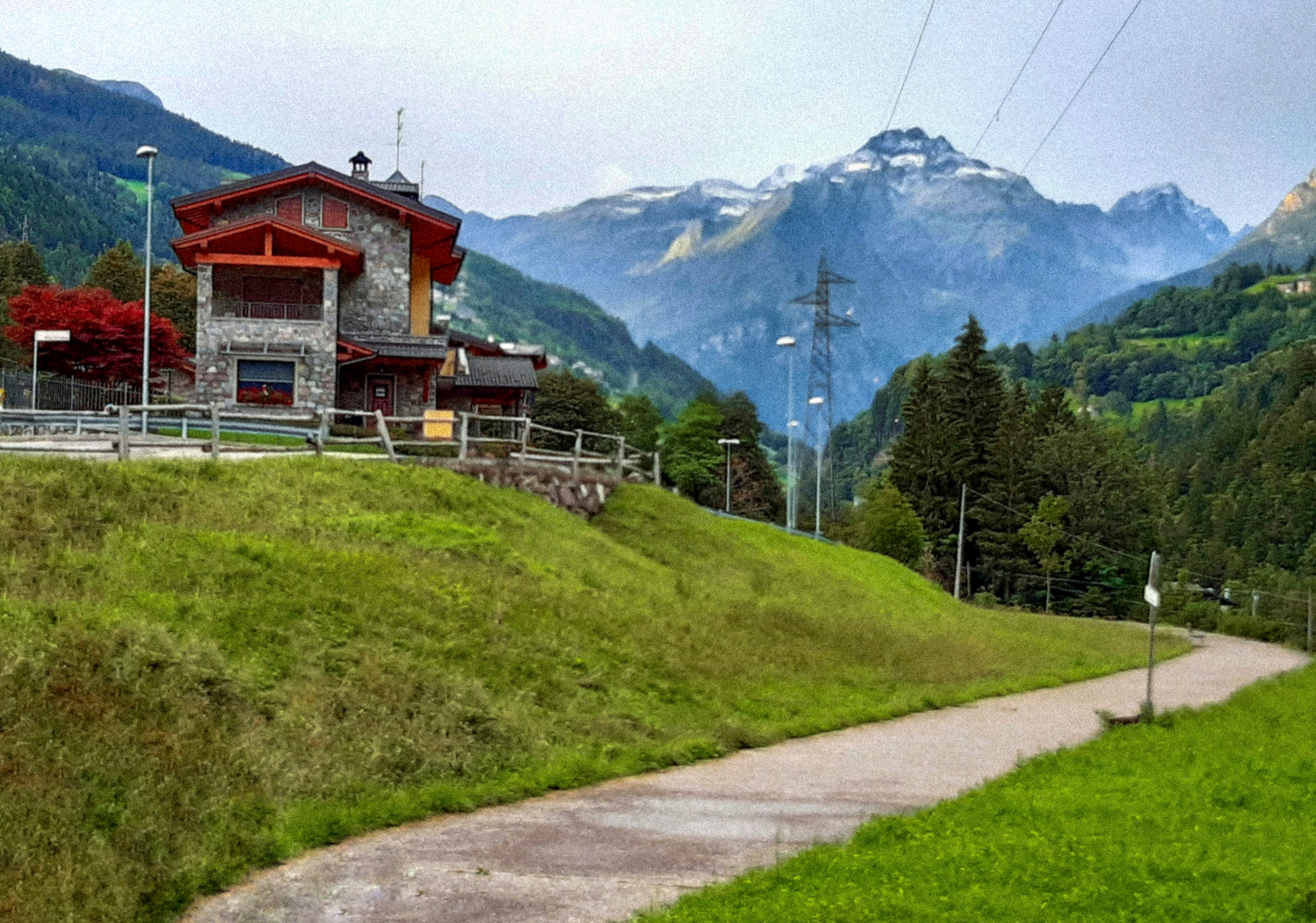
View of Punta Scais peak from Gromo

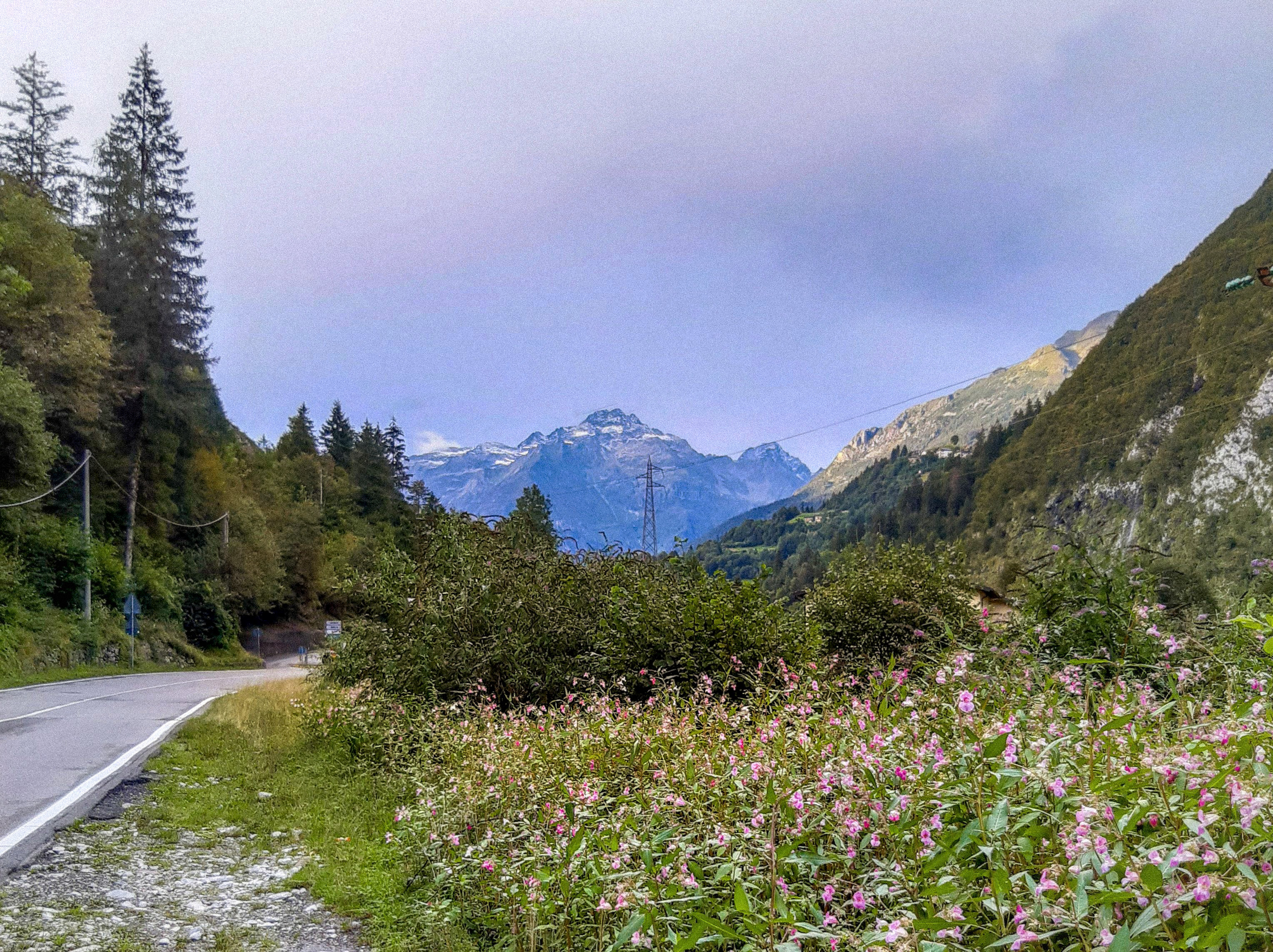
Bergamo Alps in Mid-summer

== Panorama ==
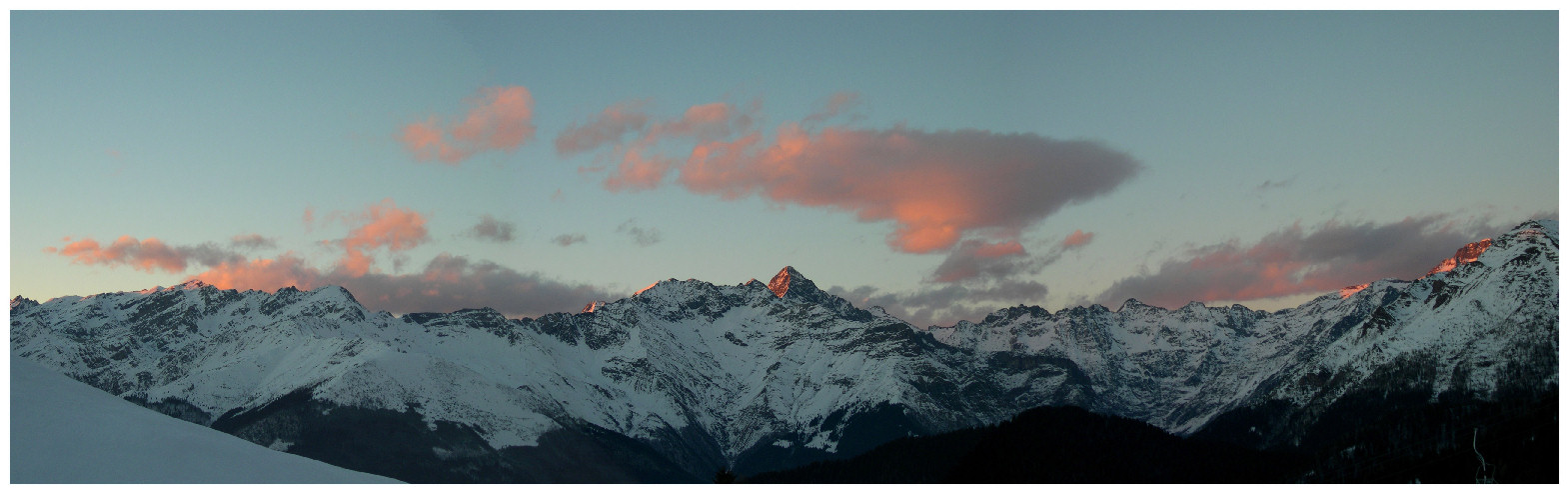
Winter panorama

== Maps ==
- Italian official cartography (Istituto Geografico Militare - IGM); on-line version: www.pcn.minambiente.it

== See also ==
- Bergamasque Prealps
- Lakes of Porcile
