= Pizzo di Rodes =

Mountain of Lombardy, Italy

Coordinates: 46°05′45″N 9°57′37″E

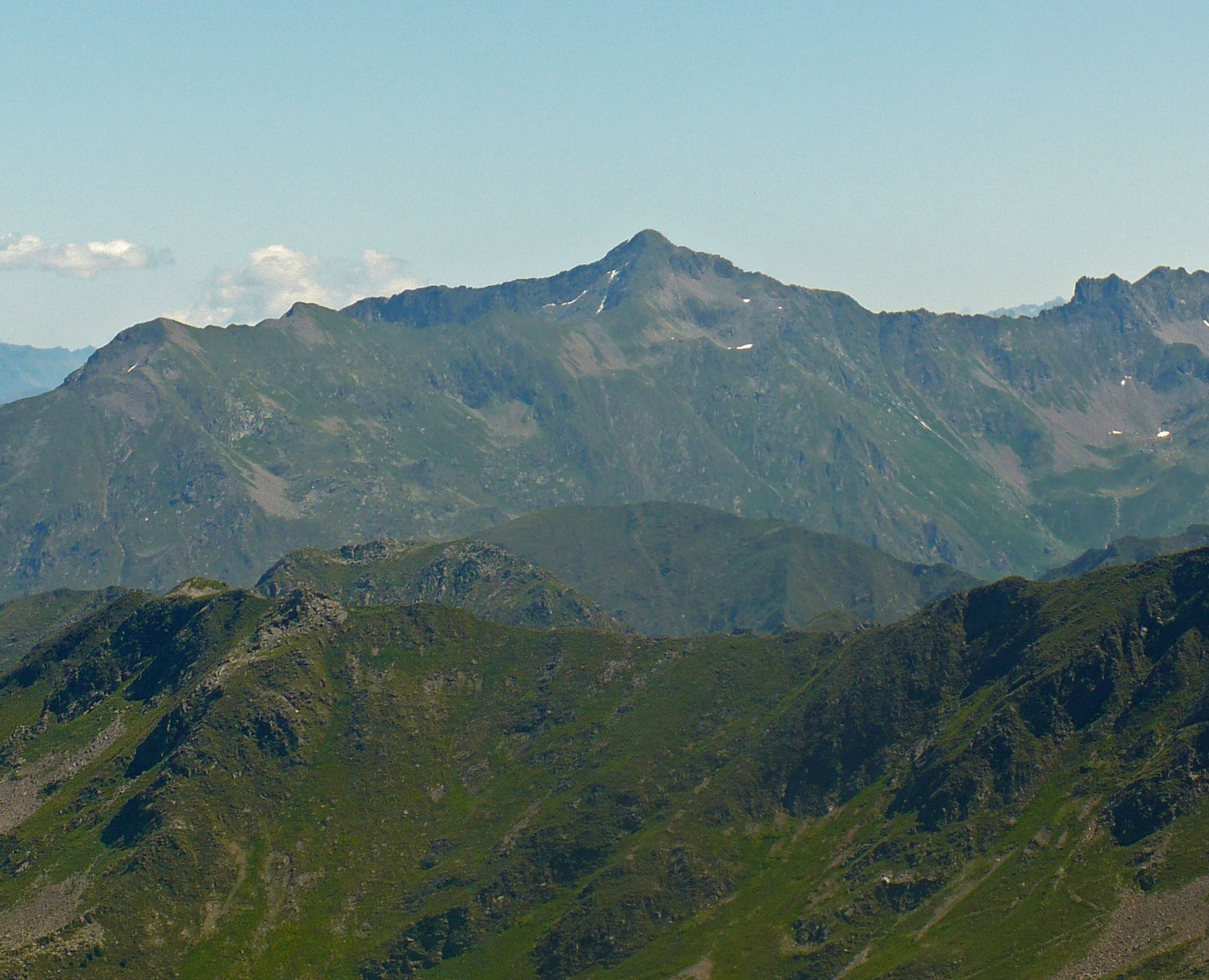
- Pizzo di Rodes seen from Corno Stella

Highest point
- Elevation: 2,831 m (9,288 ft)

Geography
- Location: Lombardy, Italy

Pizzo di Rodes is a mountain of Lombardy, Italy. It has an elevation of 2,831 metres above sea level.
