= Monte Due Mani =

Mountain in Italy

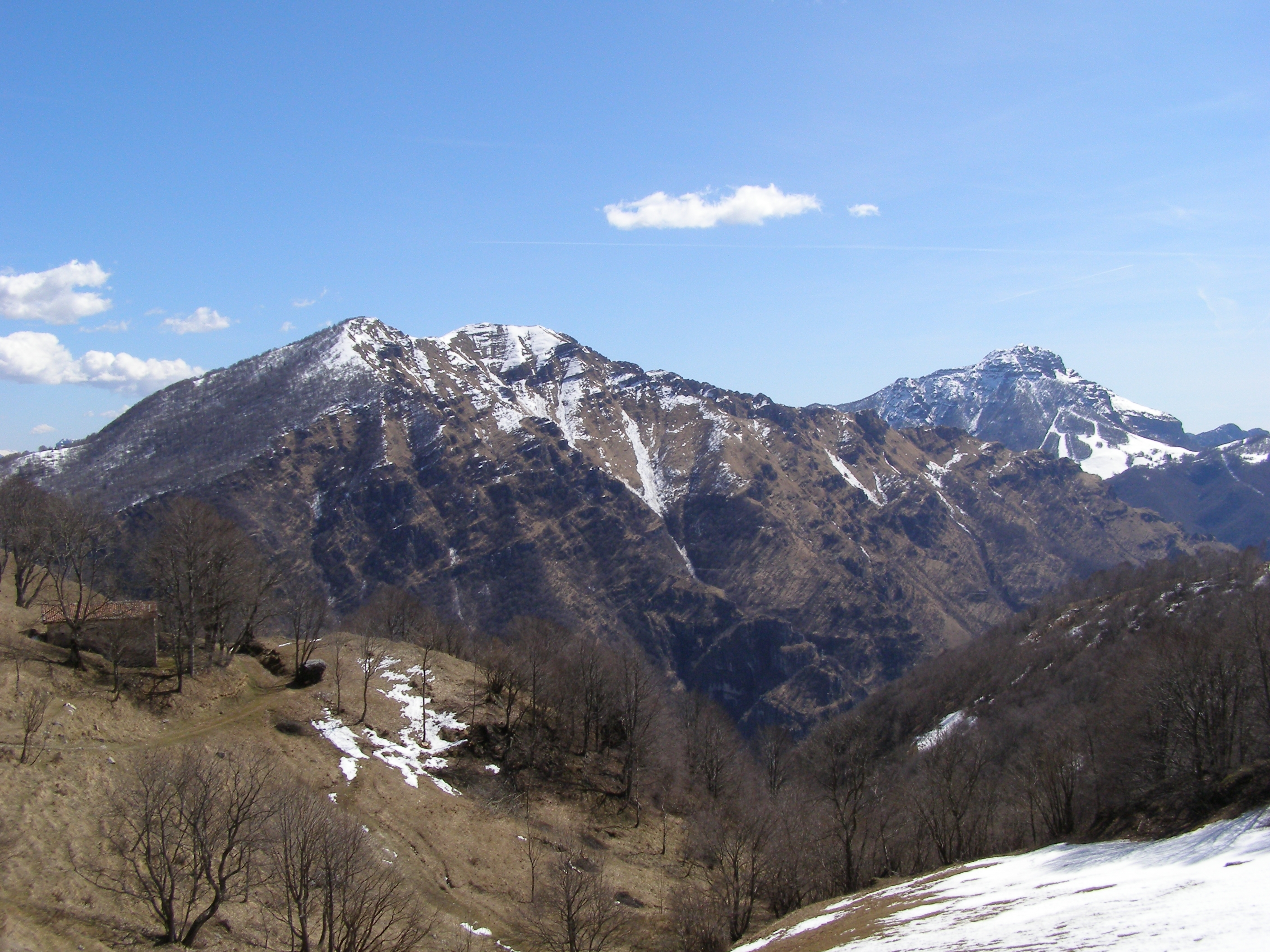
- Due Mani (left) and Resegone

Highest point
- Elevation: 1,666 m (5,466 ft)
- Prominence: 429 m (1,407 ft)
- Coordinates: 45°53′59″N 9°26′55″E

Geography
- Location within Italy
- Location: Lombardy, Italy
- Parent range: Bergamasque Prealps

Monte Due Mani is a mountain of Lombardy, Italy, with an elevation of 1,666 metres (5,466 ft).

It is located in the Bergamasque Prealps, between the Valsassina, Lake Como and the Grigna and Resegone massifs, in the province of Lecco.

The peak can be reached on foot from Culmine di San Pietro (a mountain pass in the territory of Cassina Valsassina), Ballabio or Moggio.
