= Cemetery Basilica (Thessaloniki) =

Historic site in Thessaloniki, Greece

Coordinates: 40.625052°N 22.95509°E

The Cemetery Basilica is an Early Christian basilica church located at Tritis Septemvriou Street in Thessaloniki, Greece. Only a portion of the building has been excavated, as the rest lies underneath the buildings of the Thessaloniki International Fair. The new Museum of Byzantine Culture is also located nearby.

The church is a three-aisled basilica. Its date of construction is unknown, but a number of coins dating from the period AD 380–450 have been excavated around it, making the church a 5th-century construction. The building survived intact until the 7th century, when it was destroyed during one of the barbarian assaults on the city. The church is connected to the nearby martyrion of Alexander of Pydna, and features also a kyklion – an unusual subterranean corridor underneath the sanctuary, probably connected with the cult of the martyrs.
