= Monte Sodadura =

Mountain in Lombardy, Italy

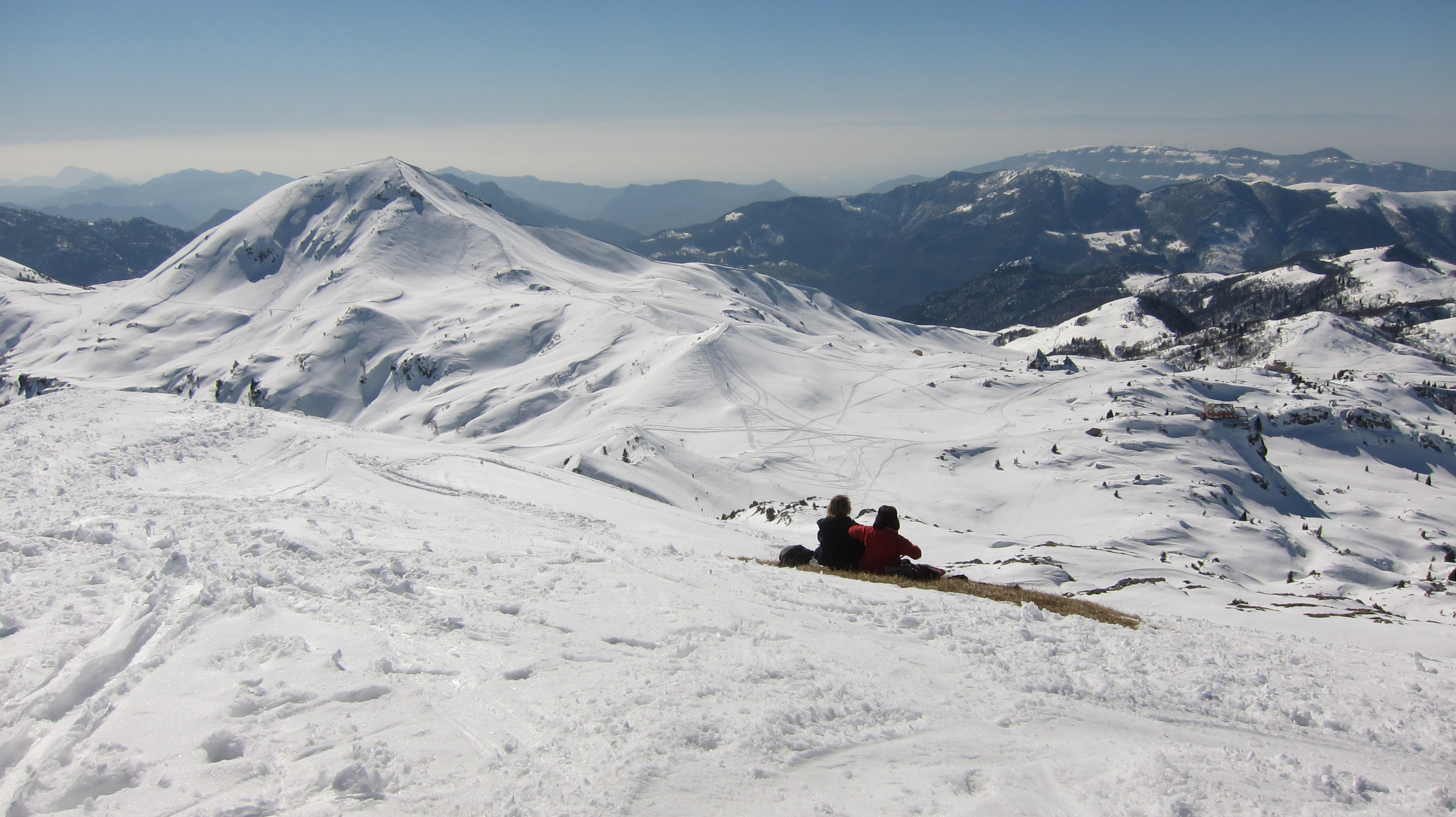
- Monte Sodadura (left) seen from nearby Cima di Piazzo during winter

Highest point
- Elevation: 2,010 m (6,590 ft)
- Prominence: 132 m (433 ft)
- Coordinates: 45°56′24″N 9°32′50″E

Geography
- Location: Lombardy, Italy
- Parent range: Bergamasque Prealps

Monte Sodadura is a mountain of Lombardy, Italy, with an elevation of 2,010 metres (6,594 ft). It is located in the Bergamasque Prealps, in the Province of Bergamo and close to the border with the Province of Lecco, between the Valsassina and the Val Taleggio.

Monte Sodadura rises as a rough pyramid from the Piani di Artavaggio, a grassy plateau and former ski resort overlooking the town of Moggio. It can be reached in about an hour through hiking paths starting from the Piani, or through longer paths starting from Pizzino, in the Val Taleggio.

A small mountain pass, called the Bocchetta di Regadur, divides it from the nearby Monte Aralalta.
