= Secco =

Secco is a surname of Italian origin, which means dry. It may refer to:

- Alessio Secco (born 1970), Italian football manager
- Caio Secco (born 1990), Brazilian footballer
- Deborah Secco (born 1979), Brazilian actress
- Edson Secco (born 1976), Brazilian composer, musician, and sound designer
- Louis Secco (1927–2008), Canadian ice hockey player and Olympic medalist
- Madeline Secco (born 1994), Canadian women's field hockey player
- Stefano Secco (born 1973), Italian operatic tenor
- Tom Secco (born ?), American men's soccer coach

== Fictional characters ==
- Secco, a minor antagonist of the manga and anime Golden Wind
- Secco, a character in the adult animated series Tear Along the Dotted Line

== See also ==
- Secco, a musical term meaning "dry", "without resonance", or "quick"
- Secco or Fresco-secco, a type of mural painting where paint is applied to dry plaster on a wall
- Monte Secco, a mountain in Lombardy, Italy
