= Bergamasque Prealps =

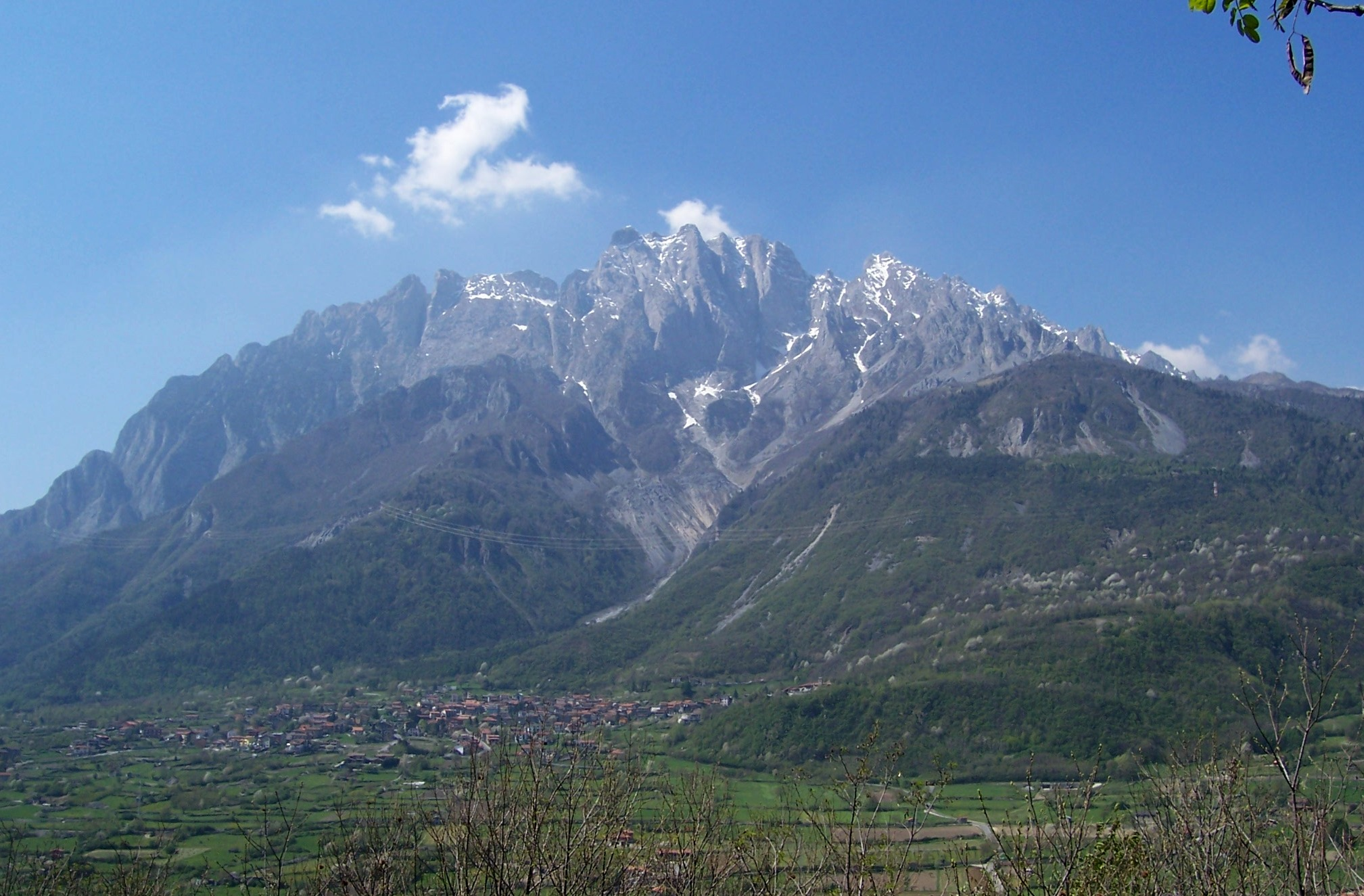
- Mount Concarena - view from Naquane Val Camonica

Highest point
- Peak: Mount Concarena
- Elevation: 2,549 m (8,363 ft)
- Coordinates: 46°00′41″N 10°16′46″E

Naming
- Native name: Prealpi Bergamasche (Italian)

Geography
- Country: Italy
- Region: Lombardy
- Province: Bergamo; Brescia; Lecco
- Parent range: Bergamasque Alps and Prealps
- Borders on: Bergamo Alps, Lugano Prealps, Brescia and Garda Prealps and Po plain

Geology
- Orogeny: Alpine orogeny
- Rock type: Sedimentary rocks

The Bergamasque Prealps (Italian: Prealpi Bergamasche) are a mountain range within the Alps. The range is located in Lombardy, in the north of Italy.

== Geography ==
Administratively the range belongs to the Italian province of Bergamo and, to a lesser extent, to the provinces of Lecco and Brescia.

The western slopes of the mountains are drained by the Adda, the central and eastern part of the range by Oglio and other minor rivers and streams, all of them tributaries of the Po.

=== SOIUSA classification ===
According to SOIUSA (International Standardized Mountain Subdivision of the Alps) the mountain range is an Alpine subsection, classified in the following way:

- main part = Eastern Alps
- major sector = Southern Limestone Alps
- section = Bergamasque Alps and Prealps
- subsection = Bergamasque Prealps
- code = II/C-29.II

== Borders ==
The Bergamo Prealps stretch between Lake Como (west) and Lake Iseo (east). They are separated from the Bergamo Alps (north) by some secondary valleys of Val Brembana, Val Seriana and Val Camonica: Valsassina, Valtorta, Val Secca, Valcanale, Val Nembo, Val di Scalve and Val Paisco. Towards south they end with the Po plain.

=== Subdivision ===
The Bergamasque Prealps are subdivided into three supergroups:

- Catena Campelli-Resegone-Grigne (or Prealpi Bergamasche Occidentali) - SOIUSA code: II/C-29.II-A,
- Catena Arera-Alben (or Prealpi Bergamasche Centrali) - SOIUSA code: II/C-29.II-B,
- Catena Presolana-Pora-Concarena (or Prealpi Bergamasche Orientali) - SOIUSA code: II/C-29.II-C.

== Notable summits ==
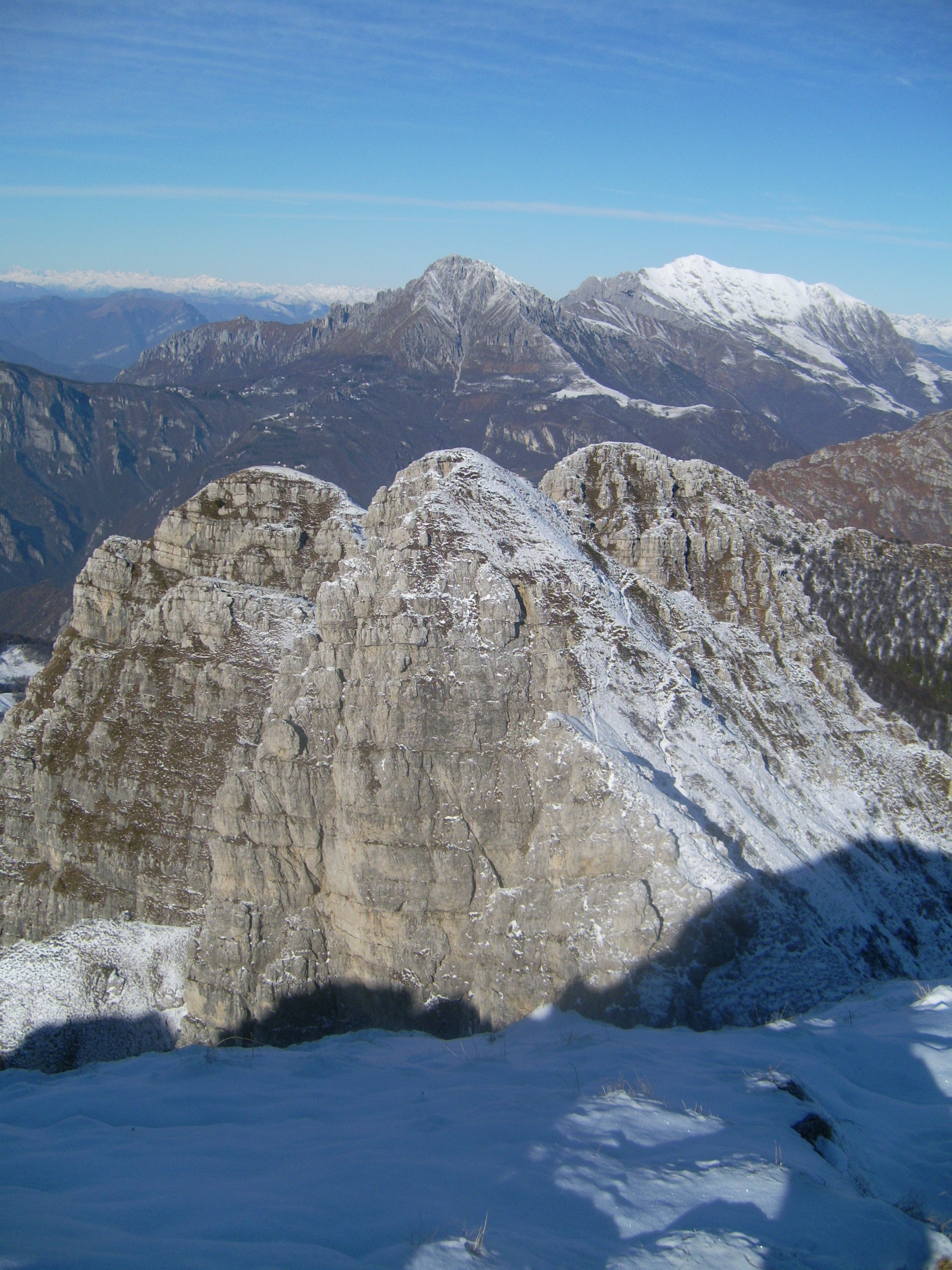
Monte Resegone, in the western part of the range

Some notable summits of the range are:

Name	metres
Concarena	2,549
Presolana	2,521
Pizzo Arera	2,512
Pizzo Camino	2,492
Grigna	2,410
Cime di Lemma	2,348
Cima del Fop	2,322
Monte Secco	2,267
Monte Sodadura	2,010
Monte Resegone	1,875
Monte Pora	1,880
Monte Negrino	1,781
Monte Altissimo	1,703
Monte Due Mani	1,666
Pizzo Formico	1,636
Monte Linzone	1,392
Monte Misma	1,160
Canto Alto	1,146
Monte Canto	710

== See also ==
- Bergamo Alps
- Monte Alben

== Maps ==
- Italian official cartography (Istituto Geografico Militare - IGM); on-line version: www.pcn.minambiente.it
