= Concarena =

Mountain in Italy

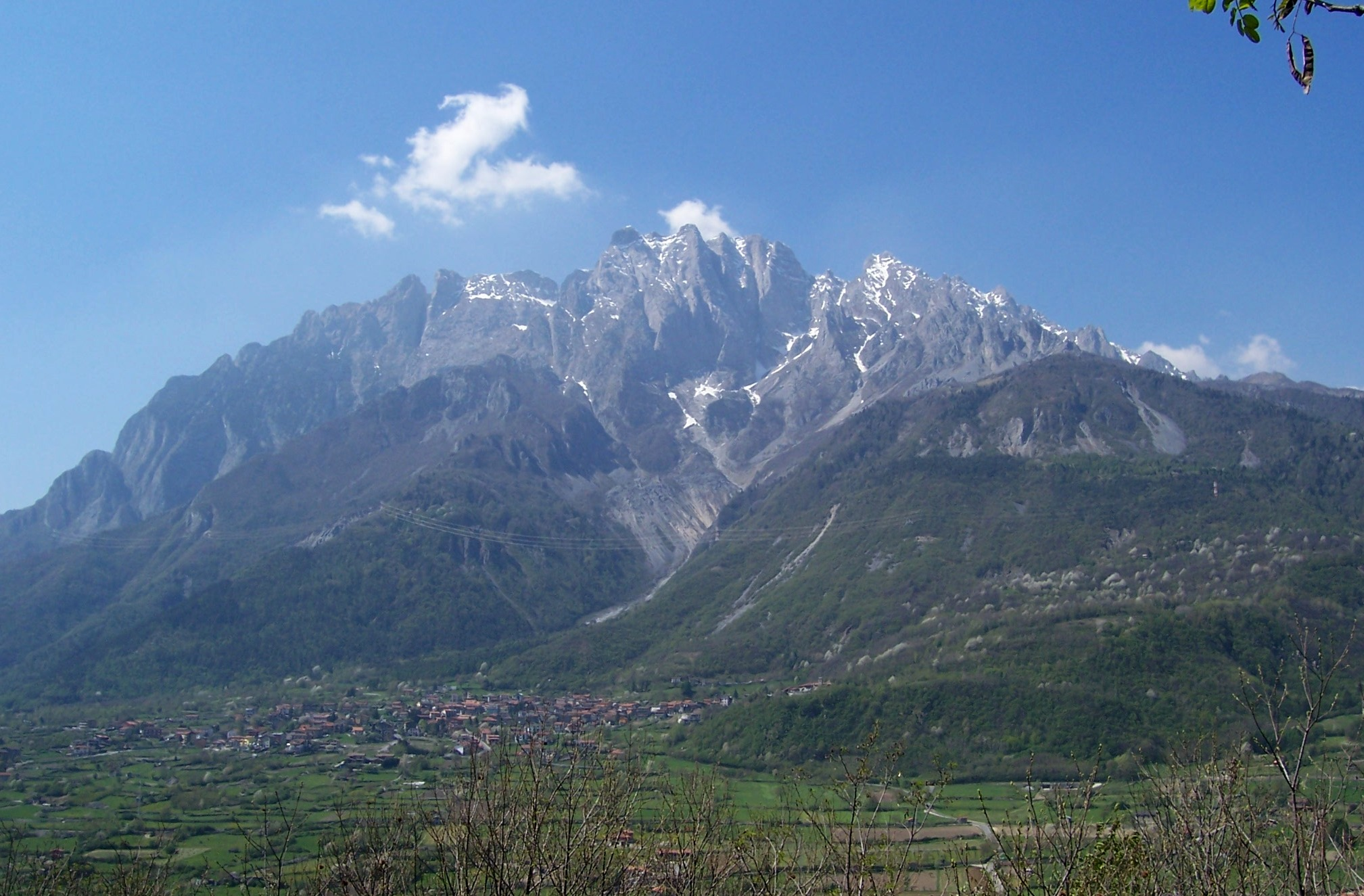
- Monte Concarena

Highest point
- Elevation: 2,549 m (8,363 ft)
- Prominence: 721 m (2,365 ft)
- Listing: Alpine mountains 2500-2999 m
- Coordinates: 46°00′41″N 10°16′46″E

Geography
- Location within Alps
- Location: Lombardy, Italy
- Parent range: Bergamasque Prealps

The Concarena is a mountain in Lombardy, northern Italy. It is multi summited and its highest peak is the Cima della Bacchetta, with a height of 2,549 m.

The Concarena divides the mid Val Camonica and the Valle di Scalve, lying at its north-eastern tip (the southern one being the Pizzo Camino). Most of the mountain is located in the province of Brescia, with only the north-western areas part of the province of Bergamo.

Other summits over 2,000 meters include the Cima dei Ladrinai (2,403 m), Monte Vaccio (2,338 m) and the Corno del Dente (2,303 m).

The mountain is composed of carbonate rocks from the Triassic period (c. 225 million years ago).

== SOIUSA classification ==
According to the SOIUSA (International Standardized Mountain Subdivision of the Alps) the mountain can be classified in the following way:

- main part = Eastern Alps
- major sector = Southern Limestone Alps
- section = Bergamasque Alps and Prealps
- subsection = Bergamasque Prealps
- supergroup = Prealpi Bergamasche Orientali
- group = Gruppo Camino-Concarena
- subgroup = Gruppo della Concarena
- code = II/C-29.II-C.11.c
