= Monte Misma =

Mountain in Italy

Coordinates: 45°44′06″N 9°49′09″E

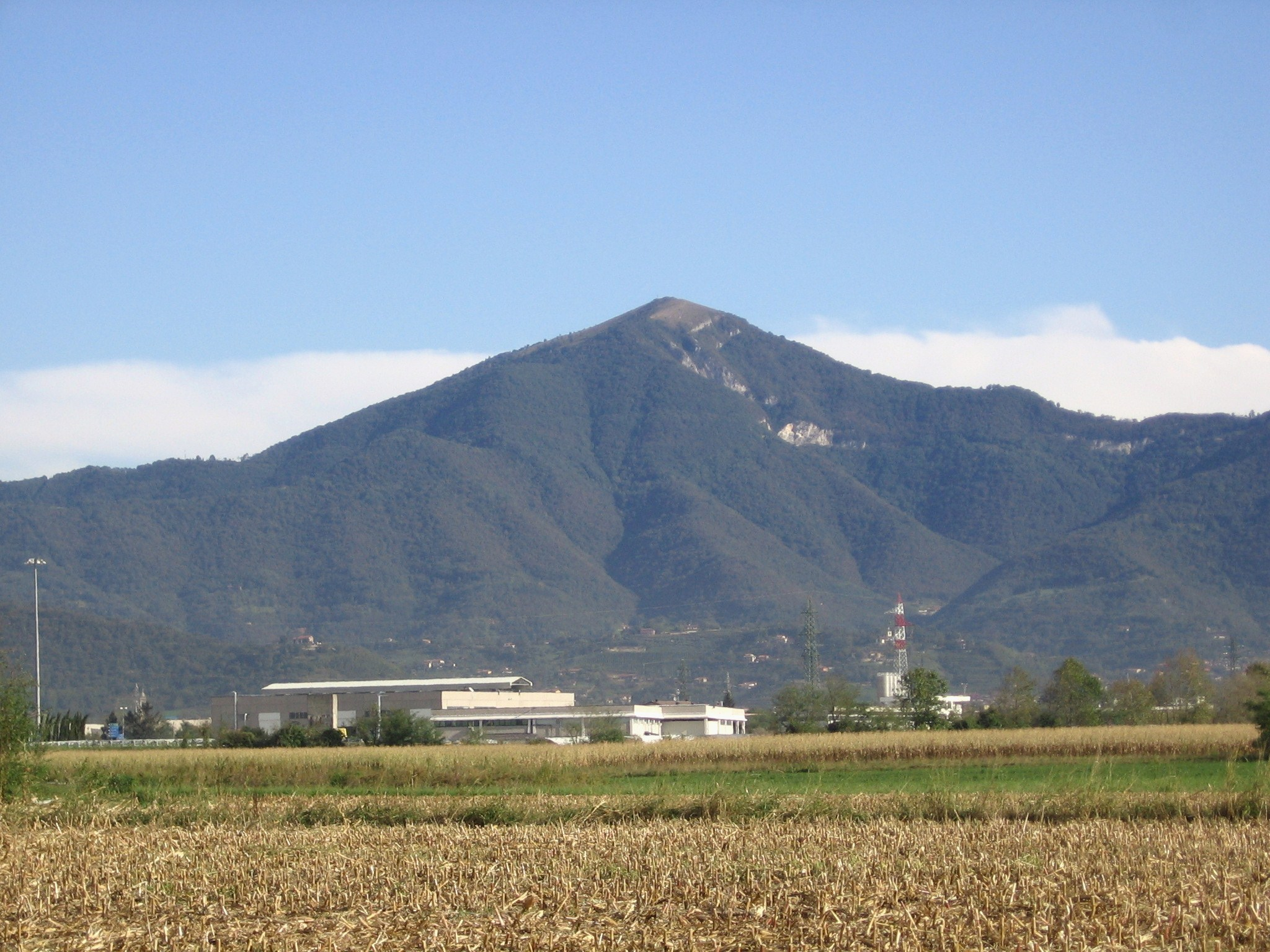

Highest point
- Elevation: 1,160 m (3,810 ft)

Geography
- Location: Lombardy, Italy
- Parent range: Bergamasque Prealps

Monte Misma is a mountain of Lombardy, Italy. It is located within the Bergamasque Prealps. Monte Misma has been a mountain hiking destination for over a century.
