= Cime di Lemma =

Mountain in Italy

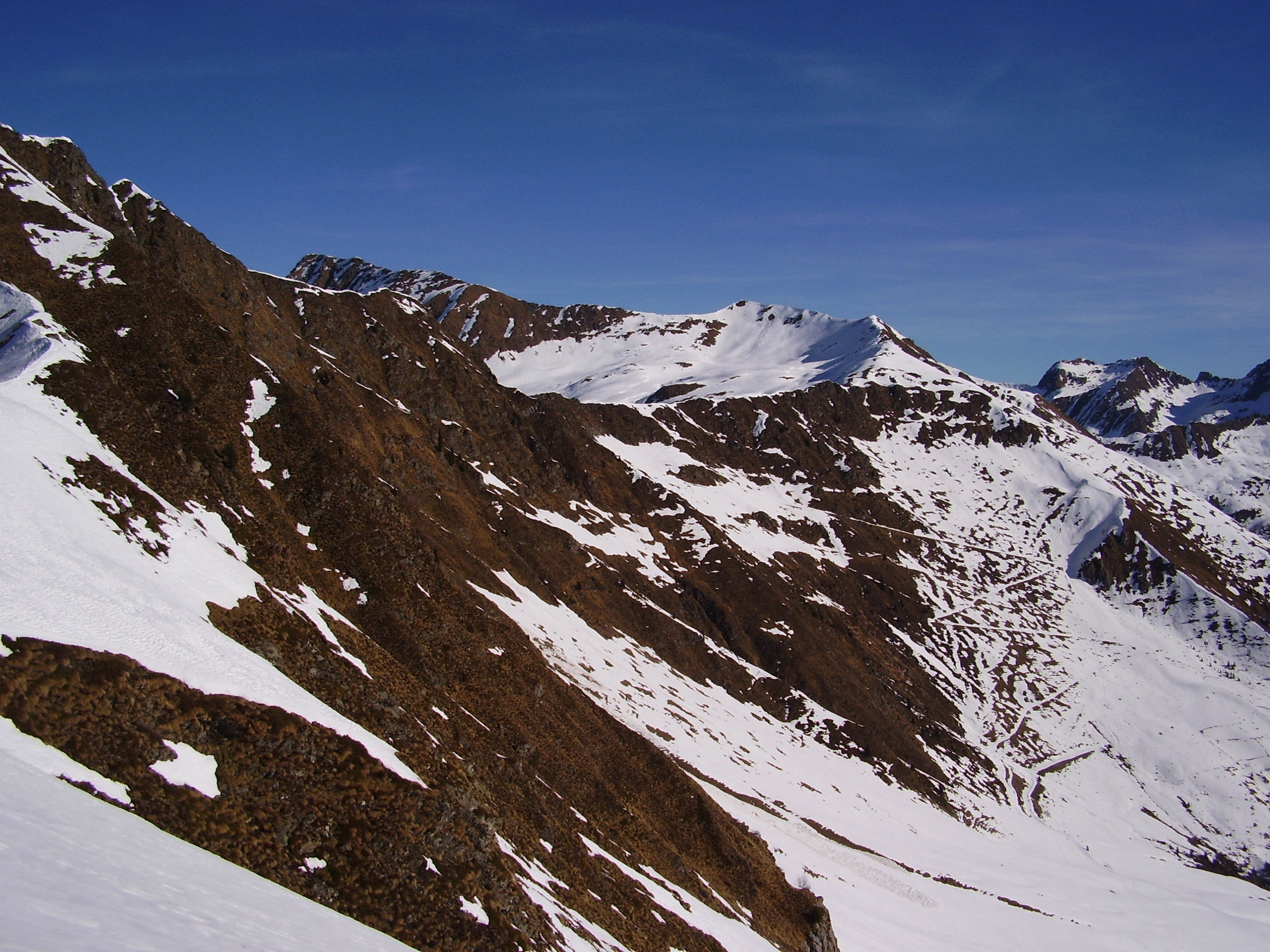

Highest point
- Elevation: 2,348 m (7,703 ft)

Geography
- Location: Lombardy, Italy
- Parent range: Bergamo Alps

Cime di Lemma is a 2,348-metre (7,703 ft) mountain peak of Lombardy, Italy. It is located within the Bergamo Alps, near the border of the provinces of Sondrio and Bergamo in Lombardy, Italy. Situated above the Tartano Valley (Val Tartano), the mountain is particularly notable as a classic and highly frequented destination for ski mountaineering in the Valtellina region.

== Geography and Access ==
Cima di Lemma is located within the Lombardy region of northern Italy. It is primarily accessed via the Val Tartano, a lateral valley of the broader Valtellina.

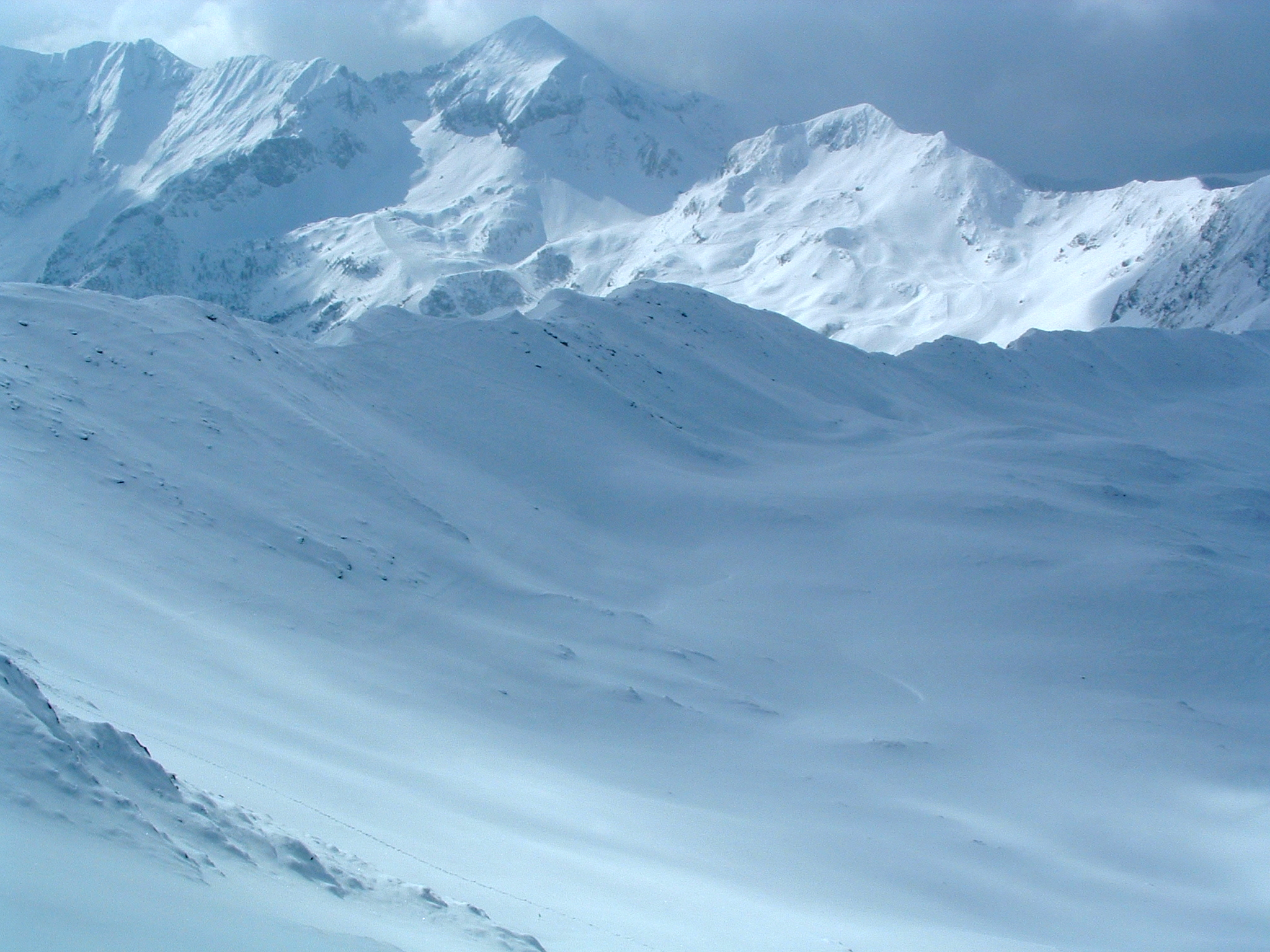
The ridge that, from the highest peak, leads towards the Lemma Pass

The standard staging point for winter ascents is the hamlet of Le Teggie which is located at an elevation of 1,400 metres (4,600 ft). Access to the trail-head is typically achieved by traveling past to the town of Morbegno, navigating through the village of Tartano, and driving up the main valley road. The exact starting point for mountaineers is highly dependent on seasonal snow conditions, although a designated parking clearing near the year-round inhabited houses of Le Teggie, just past a small artificial tunnel and is a commonly used base.

== Ski Mountaineering ==
The route to Cima di Lemma from Le Teggie is considered a very classic early-season ski mountaineering excursion. The round trip covers a positive elevation difference of 948 metres (3,110 ft) and generally takes approximately five hours to complete (four hours for the ascent and one hour for the descent). In the Italian grading system, the difficulty is rated as MS (Medio Sciatore).

The Cime di Lemma rise in the Orobie Alps along the ridge that connects the Lemma Pass to the Tartano Pass, on the border between the municipalities of Tartano (SO) and Valleve (BG); the highest reaches 2,312 m. The ridge that connects them rises from the southwest to the northeast. The northern slope and the stretch at the southeast end host mountain pastures in the summer, while the southwest flank is steeper and therefore less frequented.

Frequented in winter by ski mountaineers and in summer by hikers, the peaks offer a wide panorama of Monte Disgrazia, Monte Pegherolo, Monte Cavallo, Pizzo Rotondo, Monte Arete, Monte Cadelle and Monte Valegino, as well as the San Simone ski slopes, and are often frequented by chamois.

Standard alpine touring equipment, including skis, climbing skins, and avalanche safety gear (ARTVA/avalanche transceiver), is required. The most highly recommended period for undertaking the route is during the early winter months of January and February.

=== Ascent and Descent Route ===
The peaks can be reached via a hiking trail from the Tartano Pass. This can also be easily reached from the hamlet of San Simone di Valleve, first following a road, then a trail that reaches the pass. From there, follow the ridge westward until you reach the main summit.

While the standard route to the summit proceeds directly up the valley towards Passo Tartano, a prominent variation involves ascending the steep, north-facing slopes above the valley floor. This path navigates through a forest, passing an initial group of mountain huts. Climbers then traverse halfway up to the left before taking a ramp to reach the open spaces visible from the Tartano Pass.

Instead of reaching the pass directly, skiers typically climb into a gorge situated to the right, directly beneath the peak of Cima di Lemma. Navigating steep mid-slope sections, the route enters a scenic valley characterized by bumps and dips. Skis are traditionally left at the col to the right of the summit, and the final stretch to the peak is completed on foot. The descent is generally made via the same route.

== Snow Conditions ==
The mountain's topography offers varying kind of snow conditions depending on the chosen route. Because the steeper, forested variation faces north, it frequently retains high-quality powdery snow and is highly favored by skiers for the downhill descent. Conversely, the traditional approach via Passo Tartano concludes on a south-facing slope, which is exposed to the sun and often results in highly variable and less predictable snow conditions.

== See also ==
Valtellina

Bergamo Alps

Ski mountaineering
