= Cima del Fop =

Mountain in Italy

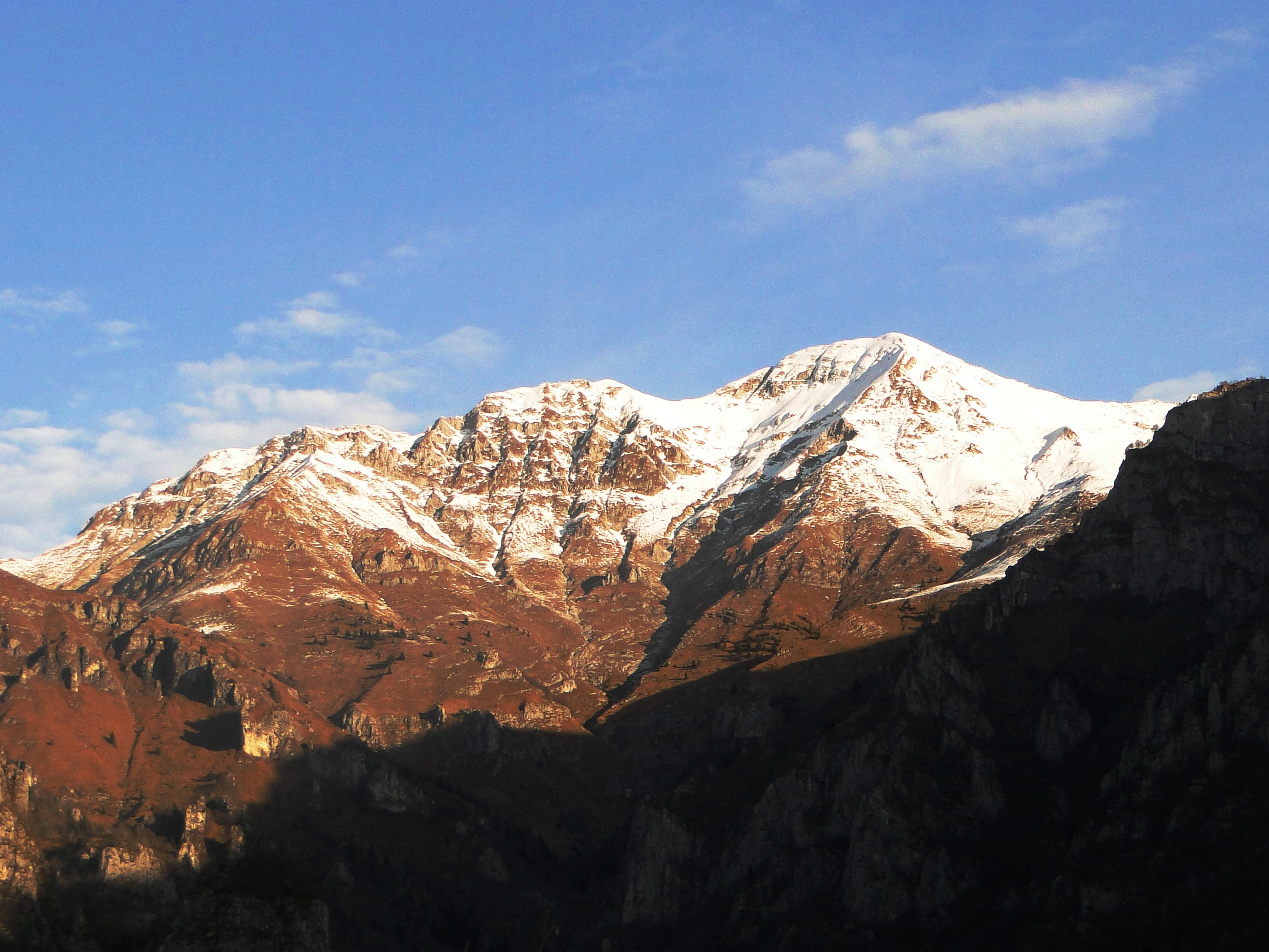
- Cima del Fop

Highest point
- Elevation: 2,322 m (7,618 ft)
- Coordinates: 45°56′00″N 9°51′51″E

Geography
- Location within Alps
- Location: Lombardy, Italy
- Parent range: Bergamasque Prealps

Cima del Fop is a mountain of Lombardy, Italy. It is located within the Bergamasque Prealps.
