= Museum of Byzantine Culture =

Museum in Thessaloniki, Greece

Coordinates: 40.6239°N 22.9550°E

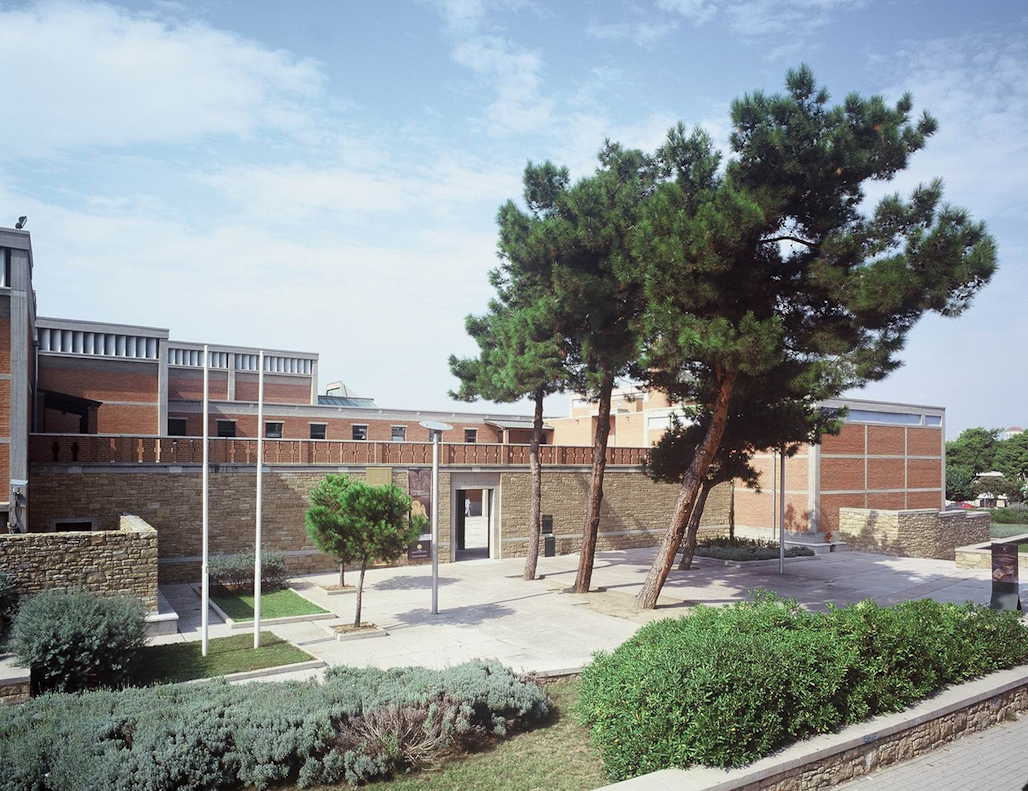
The Museum of Byzantine Culture

The Museum of Byzantine Culture (Greek: Μουσείο Βυζαντινού Πολιτισμού) is a museum in Thessaloniki, Central Macedonia, Greece, which opened in 1994.

== History ==
To design the museum, a nationwide architectural competition was announced in 1977. The competition was ultimately won by the entry of Kyriakos Krokos. Construction of the building began in March 1989, and was completed in October 1993. Antiquities from the Byzantine and Christian Museum in Athens were transferred in June 1994, some of them being displayed in the museum's inaugural exhibition, "Byzantine Treasures of Thessaloniki: The Return Journey". The museum finally opened on 11 September 1994.

== Purpose of the museum ==
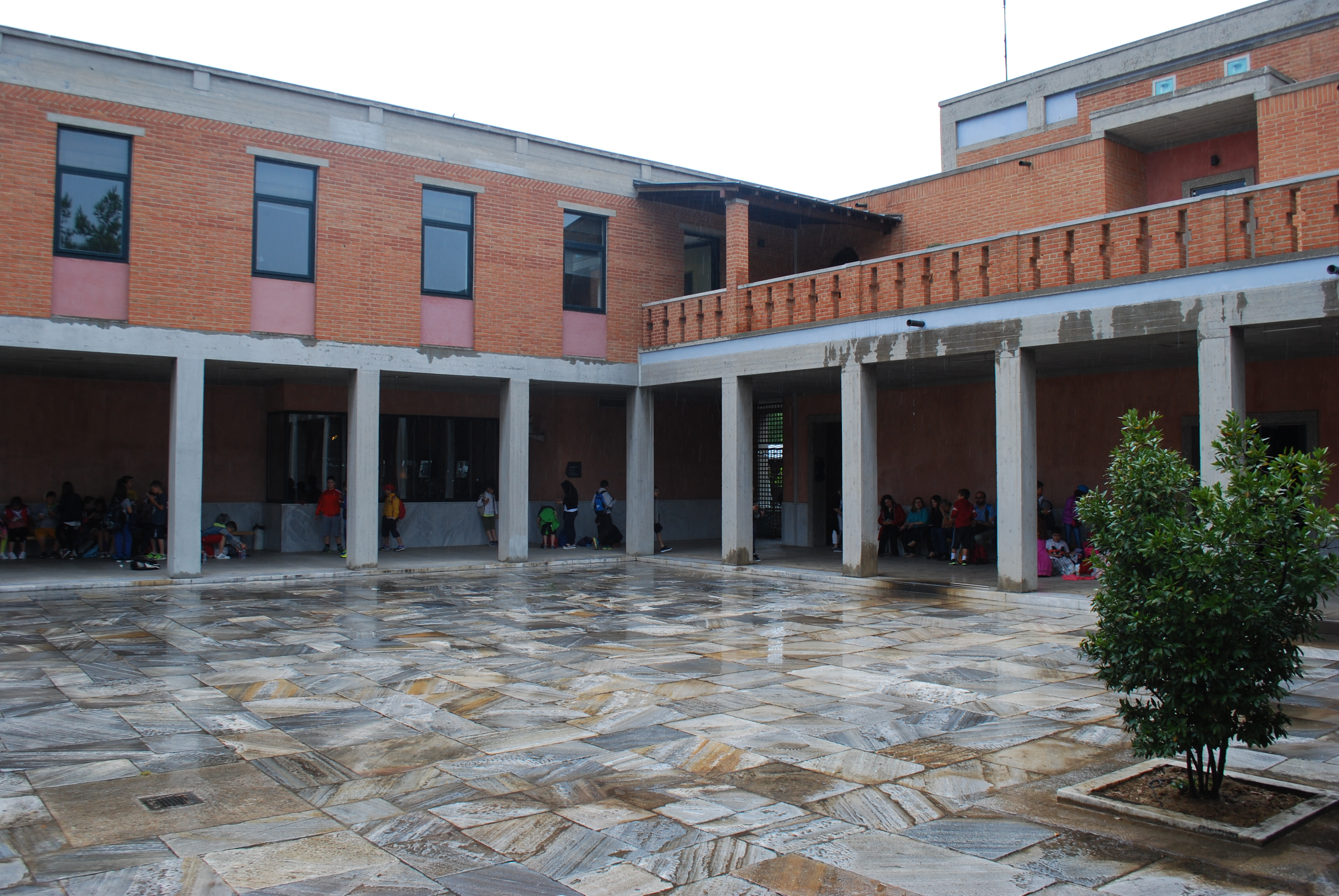
View of the atrium

Article 4, Goals:

The museum is a scientific institution, open to the public, of a broader cultural and educational nature, aims to collect, preserve, protect, conserve, exhibit and study the works and objects of the early Christian, Byzantine, medieval in general and post-Byzantine periods, mainly from the geographical area of Macedonia and the excavation material of the territorial scope of the 9th Ephorate of Byzantine Antiquities, with which it is in close collaboration. The Museum of Byzantine Culture also works as appropriate with the other Ephorates, when this is necessary for the enrichment and fuller, better and more scientifically informed presentation of its reports. in the framework of the realization of its aims, the Museum of Byzantine Culture is addressed to the general public, encourages through appropriate activities the increase of the number of visitors, favors the entertaining and educational contact of the public with its collections and asserts a scientifically proven and internationally scholarly way of their museum presentation.

After the publication of Decree 191 (Organization of the Ministry of Culture, Government Gazette 146 / A / 13.6.2003), the museum's goals were set out as "the acquisition, acceptance, storage, maintenance, recording, documentation, research, study, publication and display and promotion to the public of objects of the early Christian, Byzantine, medieval in general and post-Byzantine periods in northern Greece and of the modern era with subjects related to the Byzantine and Christian art".

== Exhibits ==
As of 2017, the museum has 11 permanent exhibitions. "Early Christian Churches", focuses on the design and decoration of churches in early centuries of Christianity. "Early Christian Cities and Dwellings", presents aspects of economic life, domestic handicrafts, houses, and food and clothing of early Christians, and finally, "From the Elysian Fields to the Christian Paradise" focuses on cemeteries of early Christians, jewellery, sepulchral architecture and painting, cult customs, and clay and glass objects recovered from excavated graves. Since 1998, the museum has run educational programmes for schoolchildren.

The exhibition in detail:

=== Room 1: The Early Christian Church ===
This room exhibits finds from the Protobyzantin period (4th to 7th century). After the founding of the Byzantine Empire by Constantine the Great (330 AD) Christianity became a state religion. The artifacts on display follow the development of church architecture, with marble floors and wall claddings in wealthy churches and frescoed walls in poorer churches.

=== Room 2: Early Christian City and Dwelling ===
This room displays everyday objects such as pottery, glass vessels, looms etc, replicating the reception hall of a rich household in Thessaloniki.

=== Room 3: From the Elysian Fields to the Christian Paradise ===
The exhibition, which opened in 1997, traces burial customs in the Roman world from 400 to 900 CE, focusing on gravestone inscriptions and tomb paintings.

=== Room 4: From Iconoclasm to the Splendor of the Macedonian and Komnenian Dynasties ===
Since 2000, the period from the 8th to the 12th century has been dealt with in Room 4. This so-called middle Byzantine period was regarded as a period of Byzantine humanism and Greek education. Shown are items of everyday life in the Macedonian and Komnenian Dynasties such as coins, pottery, lead seals and clothing.

=== Room 5: The Dynasties of Byzantine Emperors ===
Here the epoch of the Byzantine rulers from the time of Heraclius (610–641) to the fall of Constantinople in 1453 is considered. Since the year 2000, coins and seals from this time have been seen here.

=== Room 6: The Byzantine Castle ===
The Byzantine castles were built in strategically important locations. In order to protect their inhabitants and people from the surrounding area, even during a long period of a siege in war time, they had all the necessary facilities of a city. The archaeological finds displayed are from different castles of Macedonia. A video informs the visitor about the castles of Macedonia and Thrace. The exhibition in room 6 was opened in 2000.

=== Room 7: The Twilight of Byzantium (1204–1453) ===
The late Byzantine period is noticed by his artists and their works of art. It especially focuses on the Slavic neighbors of Greece and the monastic community of Mount Athos. Since 2002 the works of art have been exhibited.

=== Room 8: Dori Papastratos Collection ===
The collection was donated to the museum in 1994. In addition to wooden and copper printing plates, more than 200 prints from the 18th to the 19th century can be seen. Some prints were taken from the permanent exhibition of the museum and are exhibited in other museums, abroad and within Greece.

=== Room 9: The Demetrios Economopoulos Collection ===
Since 2001, some of the 1460 artefacts that Mr. Oikonopoulos has left to the museum are exhibited. The collection contains pieces from prehistoric times up to the 19th century, with Byzantine and post-Byzantine art predominant. Mainly, icons from the 14th century to the 19th century are shown.

=== Room 10: "Byzantium after Byzantium": The Byzantine Legacy in the Years after the Fall ===
It was only in 2004 that Room 10 was opened to the public in its present form. Here the Byzantine legacy after the conquest of the Ottoman Empire is illuminated. The works depicted illustrate various styles that were cultivated under the rule of the Venetians and the Ottomans. Exhibited are icons, prints, embroidery, books, silver and gold forging.

=== Room 11: Discovering the Past ===
The last room of the permanent exhibition opened in 2004. It documents the stations from the excavation of an object to its exhibition in the museum. The excavation, documentation, study and conservation phases are brought to the visitor by means of archaeological material and digital representation.

=== Temporary exhibitions ===
Since the opening of the museum, temporary exhibitions have been held, most of which touch on the subject of "Byzantium". Among other things, there were presentations of religious themes, daily life and Byzantine treasures in the monastic republic of Athos.

In addition, the exhibits of other museums are presented and thematic related hiking exhibitions are housed.

== Collections ==
The collection of the museum contains works from the 2nd to the 20th century. They originate mainly from collections, legacies, seizures, donations or were procured with private or state aid. Most of the collection consists of coins, seals and smaller artifacts, followed by sculptures and icons. They come from Thessaloniki and Macedonia, from churches, private houses and cemeteries.

The works of iconic paintings from the 16th and 17th centuries are of high artistic value. But also the rare textiles of the early Byzantine period (loans from the Benaki Museum), or tomb-works and mosaics are of particular importance. Selected artifacts are temporarily handed over to other museums at home and abroad as hiking exhibitions.

The collection includes:

=== Books and manuscripts ===
The collection includes 27 Greek books and manuscripts. The oldest are from the early Christian period; most were written on parchment. Of particular interest are some pages of the Qur‘an and an Ottoman manuscript.

=== Wooden icons ===
More than 1,000 individual works comprise the storage space of the museum; including the 442 icons that were sent to Athens during the First World War. In 1987, the number of icons was considerably increased by accessing 400 icons from the estate of Mr. Oikonopuolos. The collection is constantly being extended, not least by private donations and legacies. The museum houses icons from the 12th century to the 20th century and comes from the areas where Greeks lived under Venetian or Ottoman rule. The works are of different origin, they come from islands, from Northern Greece or Constantinople.

=== Miniatures ===
Over 7,000 objects of this group were found in Thessaloniki and further Macedonia. Almost all were discovered in organized excavations; only a few come from donations or were confiscated. They date from the late Roman period, from the Byzantine period to the time of Ottoman rule. Jewelry from gold, silver, glass and bone are represented as well as ecclesiastical objects. Furthermore, tools made of different materials are kept.

=== Fabrics ===
The existing textiles are from the 4th century to the 19th century and thus represent the entire Byzantine and post-Byzantine era. The woolen and linen tunics from Egypt are permanent loans of the Benaki Museum from Athens.

=== Coins ===
The approximately 30,000 coins of the museum were discovered in Thessaloniki and further Macedonia. They date from the late Roman period to modern times. The predominant part are bronze coins. Few are made of silver, some more are of gold. In addition to individual finds, the coins mainly come from larger hoards, which were probably created by their owners for emergency periods.

=== Seals ===
100 seals are in the possession of the Museum of Byzantine Culture. They were once used to verify documents. They are considered important historical sources to understand the administrative Byzantine system and the church hierarchy. The most important seals are of Tiberius II (698–705), Constantine VII (913–959), the patriarchs Photios (858–886) and Michael Keroularios (1043–1059).

=== Mosaics ===
The collection includes 70 mosaics that adorn the walls and floors of churches, private houses and public buildings. Most of them are from the excavation of Thessaloniki from the 4th to the 7th century. During this period, Thessaloniki was the center of mosaic art in the region. The mosaics are made of different materials. In addition to stones, marble and glass, leaf gold was also used. They depicted saints, animals, plants and geometrical shapes.

=== Wall paintings ===
About 200 wall paintings from the 3rd to the 20th century are owned by the museum. Among them are the most beautiful tomb paintings of Greece. The most popular motifs from the Greek and Roman epoch are garlands, wreaths and ribbons. Wall paintings can be found in almost all rooms of the permanent exhibition.

=== Sculptures ===
The approx. 2,000 sculptures are from the period from the 2nd / 3rd century to the 17th century. 120 sculptures are permanently exhibited in the museum. Almost all were found in Thessaloniki and the surrounding area; most of them are architectural in nature, such as capitals in the Ionic and Corinthian style. Few sculptures are preserved from the period from the 7th to the 9th century, the so-called "dark times". From the 9th to the 12th century, the artists' activities increased significantly. From this time came marble images with ecclesiastical motifs. The few, discovered sculptures from the late Byzantine period point to the decline of the empire, which fell to the Franks in 1204 and to the Ottomans in 1453.

=== Latest projects ===
They are predominantly modern paintings by Greek artists, inspired by the early Christian, Byzantine spirit. In addition to oil paintings are prints and abstract paintings. About 50 works are copies of ancient tomb paintings, mosaics and sculptures.

=== Early printed books ===
The collection of the museum consists of 22 books, mostly from the 19th and 20th century. The works are written in different languages and deal with Christian themes. The bindings of some books are valuable and elaborate. In addition to velvety envelopes one finds silver-framed covers, which depict Christian scenes or the crucifix.

== Laboratories and workshops ==
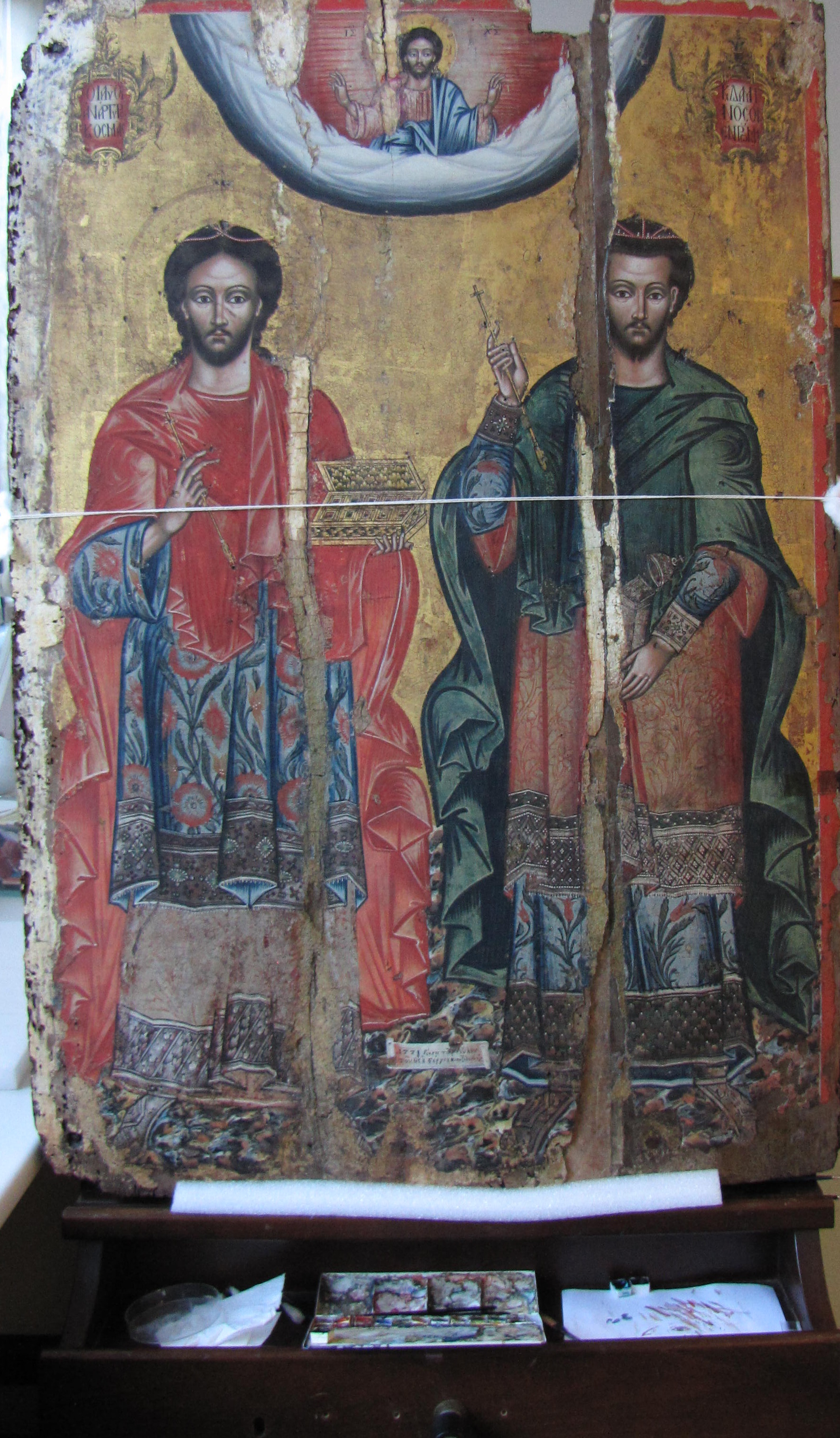
Damaged icon

The museum has seven different laboratories and workshops. They are housed on 2750 m^{2} of space, each department has a fireproof storage room and a suction system for the indoor air. Like the entire museum, the workshops are air-conditioned; Temperature and humidity are kept constant, the fresh air (supplied from outside the museum) is filtered.

The workshops utilize standard diagnostic and conservation methodologies and participate in European research programs in cooperation with national and international institutions. Additionally, the facilities host student internships for participants from Greece and abroad.

The Workshops in detail:

=== Conservation Workshop of Icons ===
The oldest workshop of the museum started work in 1993. It consists of an X-ray room, diagnostics, a room for preservation and a carpentry. The X-ray machine is also used by other departments, the radiation exposure of employees is recorded for health reasons. The conventional radiographs are digitized and stored on DVD's. Details of the surface of an object are examined with the electron microscope and displayed on a screen. Depending on requirements, the findings will continue to be examined under ultraviolet light or by infrared light. Occasionally, an underlying painting is discovered beneath the visible surface of an icon. In some cases, the older painting is brought to light again. Two conditions have to be fulfilled: the underlying painting must be in good condition and it should be much older than the picture above it. With the utmost care, the visible image is conserved, so after completion of the restoration both paintings are preserved, the one visible first and the one below. Due to the immense effort, it takes months until an experienced restorer completes the work, these works are performed quite rarely.

In addition to these non-destructive methods, destructive investigations are also used; In the process, tiny samples are taken and examined. Since the laboratory is not equipped for these examinations, they are carried out in the departments of the Universities of Thessaloniki or Athens. This lab, like some of the other laboratories, has chemicals to remove unwanted layers. The chemicals are stored in special cabinets, which may suck escaped gases before opening the cabinets.

In the workshop icons, woodcuts, painted textiles, leather and wood are processed. All work steps are documented. The first work of the conservators in 1994 was the project "Byzantine treasures of Thessaloniki, the return". There are cooperations with many national and international institutions. In addition to Greek monasteries and other institutions, these include the National Museum of Medieval Art of Korytsa (Albania) and the National Gallery of Arts of Sofia (Bulgaria).

=== Conservation Workshop of Paper ===
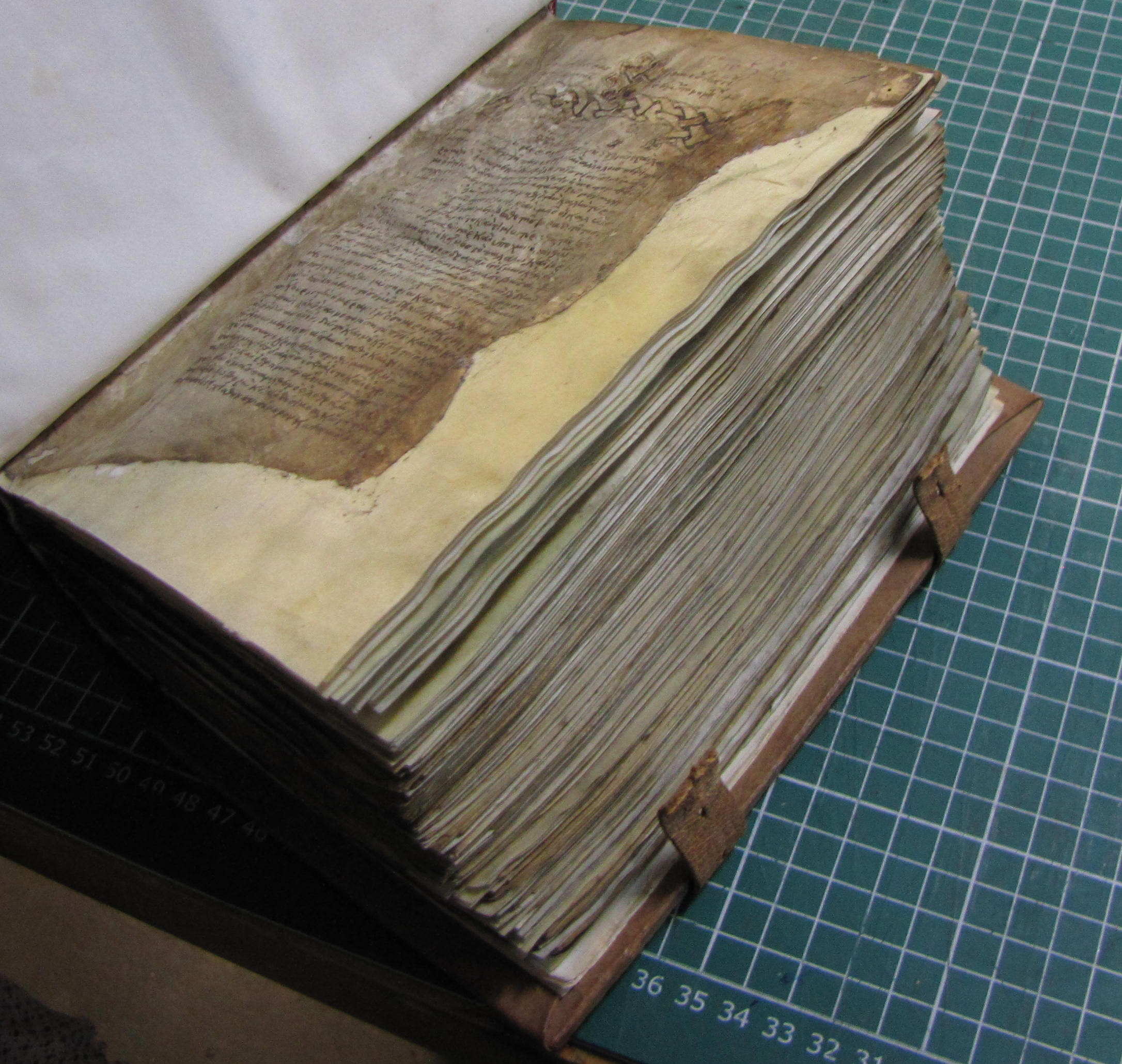
Restored book

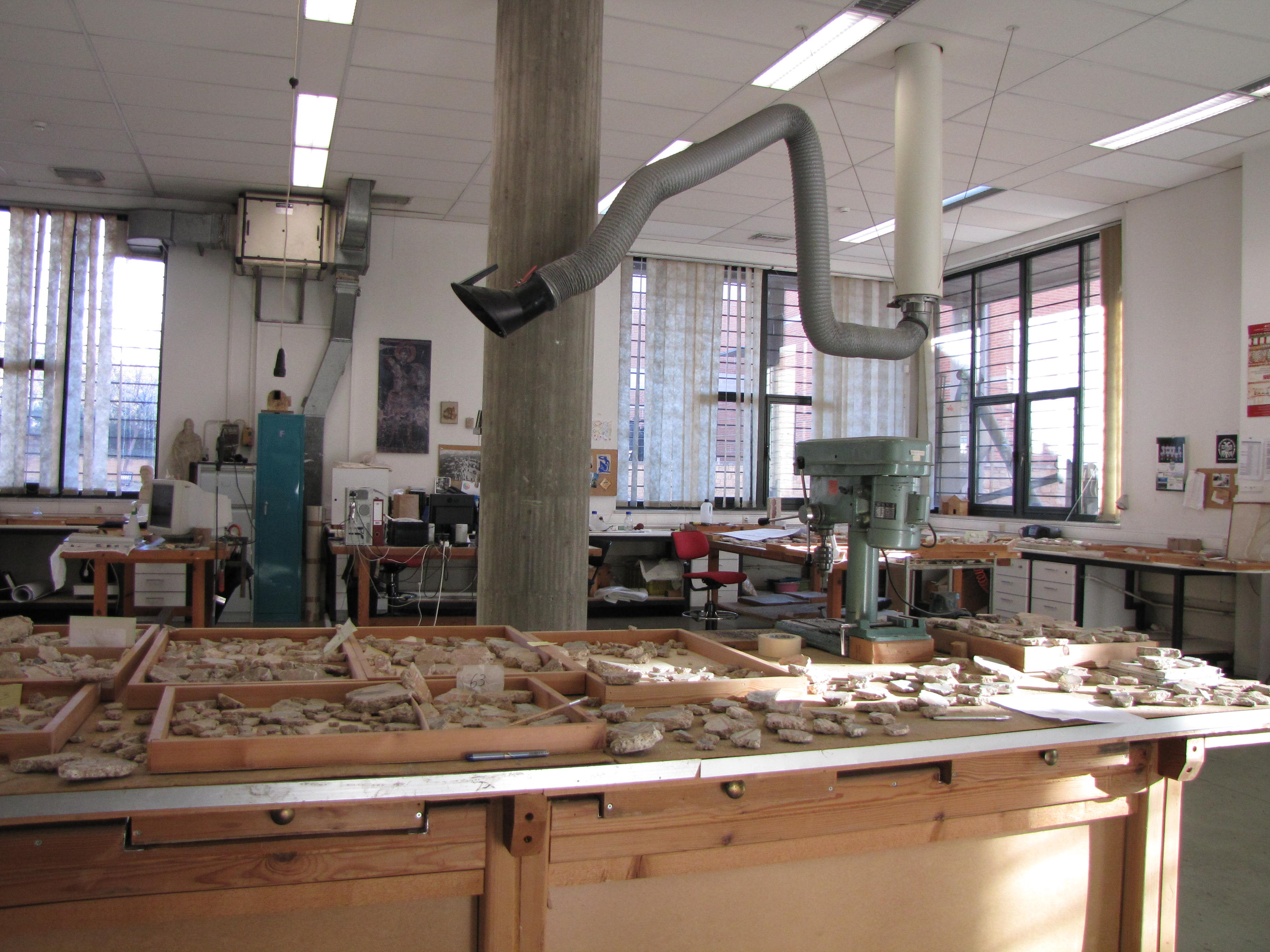
Part of a workshop (Wallpaintings)

Originally preserved in this workshop documents for the exhibition "Treasures of Mount Athos", which took place in 1997 in the rooms of the museum. Since then, the equipment has been adapted to the increased demands on the processing and preservation of the exhibits. Since the year 2000, the specialized conservators have been working in a separate room, taking care of the diagnosis, documentation and preservation of fonts made of paper or parchment. While parchment and hand-made papers age quite slowly, the preservation of books printed on industrially produced paper is more laborious. The proportion of acids makes them easier to decompose.

Parts of the staff are trained in paleography and can thus decipher the ancient scriptures.

The workshop does not just take care of the museum's collections. She is an advisor and works for the Hellenic Institute of Byzantine and Post-Byzantine Studies in Venice, the city of Kozani and the monasteries of Athos. During 2007 and 2008, the lab collaborated with the Camberwell College of Arts of the University of the Arts London.

Guided tours are available in conjunction with the museum's educational program. There will also be workshops on bookbinding, papermaking and engraving.

=== Conservation Workshop of Ceramic, Glass and Small Finds ===
Since 1994 the workshop works. Next to the work area there is a storage room and an area used for cleaning the excavated material. After the cleaning process, the finds are sorted. All color matched parts, as well as all related forms (handles, floors, etc.) are grouped together. Then they are examined for their composition and condition. As an orientation for the composition of the items serve drawings of all known forms of clay and glass vessels. The individual parts are glued together and dried in a special oven.

Both old and modern methods are used for repair and conservation.

In addition to guided tours, there are also workshops dedicated to the production of pottery.

=== Conservation Workshop of Metals ===
Coins and other metal finds are mechanically and chemically cleaned here. If necessary, heavy soiling is removed with a sandblaster, for finer work dental tools are used. As in some other workshops too, a special cabinet is for storing acids and other chemicals. available. Before opening these cabinets any escaped gases are sucked off. In addition to coins, smaller finds made of other materials, such as glass or bone, are processed.

=== Conservation Workshop of Mosaics ===
Since 1995 about 600 mosaics have been conserved. Most of them are in the museum's exhibition, and the curators are responsible for their inspection and repair. Guided tours for students of archeology and students who are especially interested in conservation are offered in conjunction with the museum's educational program.

=== Conservation Workshop of Stone ===
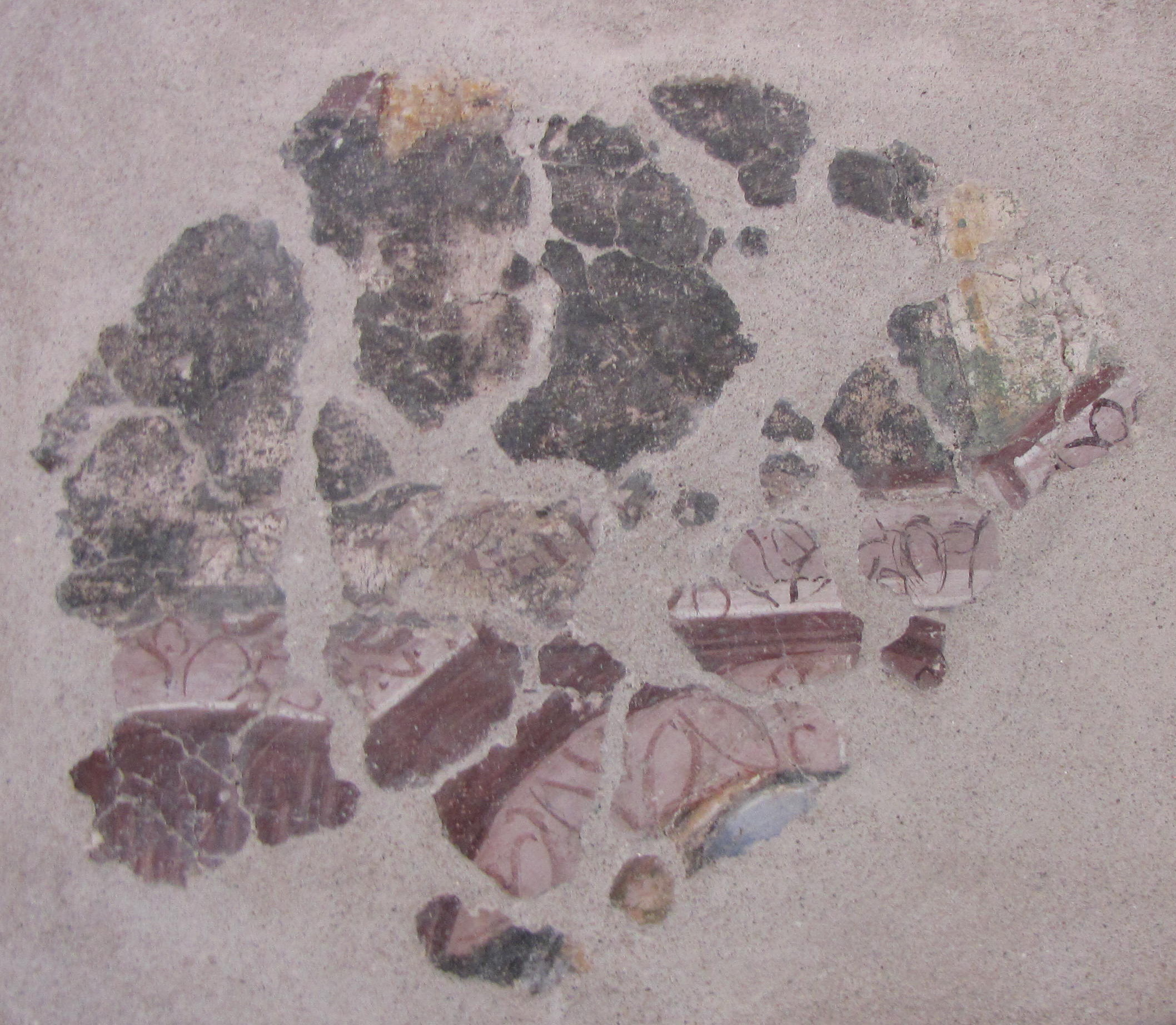
Fragments of a mural painting in fiberglas

Besides the sculptures and other stone finds of the museum, the staff also deal with the ancient finds of other regions of Greece. Since 1994, mostly marble artefacts have been worked up and preserved in a professional manner. As in the other workshops, all work steps are recorded, photographed and documented.

=== Conservation Workshop of Mural Paintings ===
The murals of the museum come from churches and other buildings from Thessaloniki and the surrounding area. The museum's collection consists of around 200 pieces, dating from the early Christian period (4th to 7th centuries), through the post-Byzantine period to the modern era (19th and 20th centuries). Most of the paintings were executed as Frescoes, from the post-Byzantine period also as Secco.

The detached murals are applied to transportable media so that they can be displayed in museums. Before they are examined microscopically and technically. This analyzes the composition of the material on which the painting was applied. Fractions of a painting are put together by the restorer in the best possible way and stuck with the painted side on a fabric, which in turn lies on a flat surface. A frame of appropriate size is made and placed around the fragments, then the frame is filled with fiberglass. The fragments are enclosed from the fiberglass. After drying, the fabric is peeled off and the adhesive removed from the resulting work.

== Storerooms ==
Approximately 1200 m^{2} of the building is used as storage space. Industrial warehouses served as a model. Sculptures are stored on pallets, which can be moved by machines. Icons and mosaics in horizontal, sliding frames. An unconventional method is used for storing amphorae. After finding a Byzantine ship, it was found that amphorae could be stacked in a space-saving manner without damaging the clay vessels.

== Awards ==
In 2005, the museum was awarded the Council of Europe's Museum Prize.

== Gallery ==
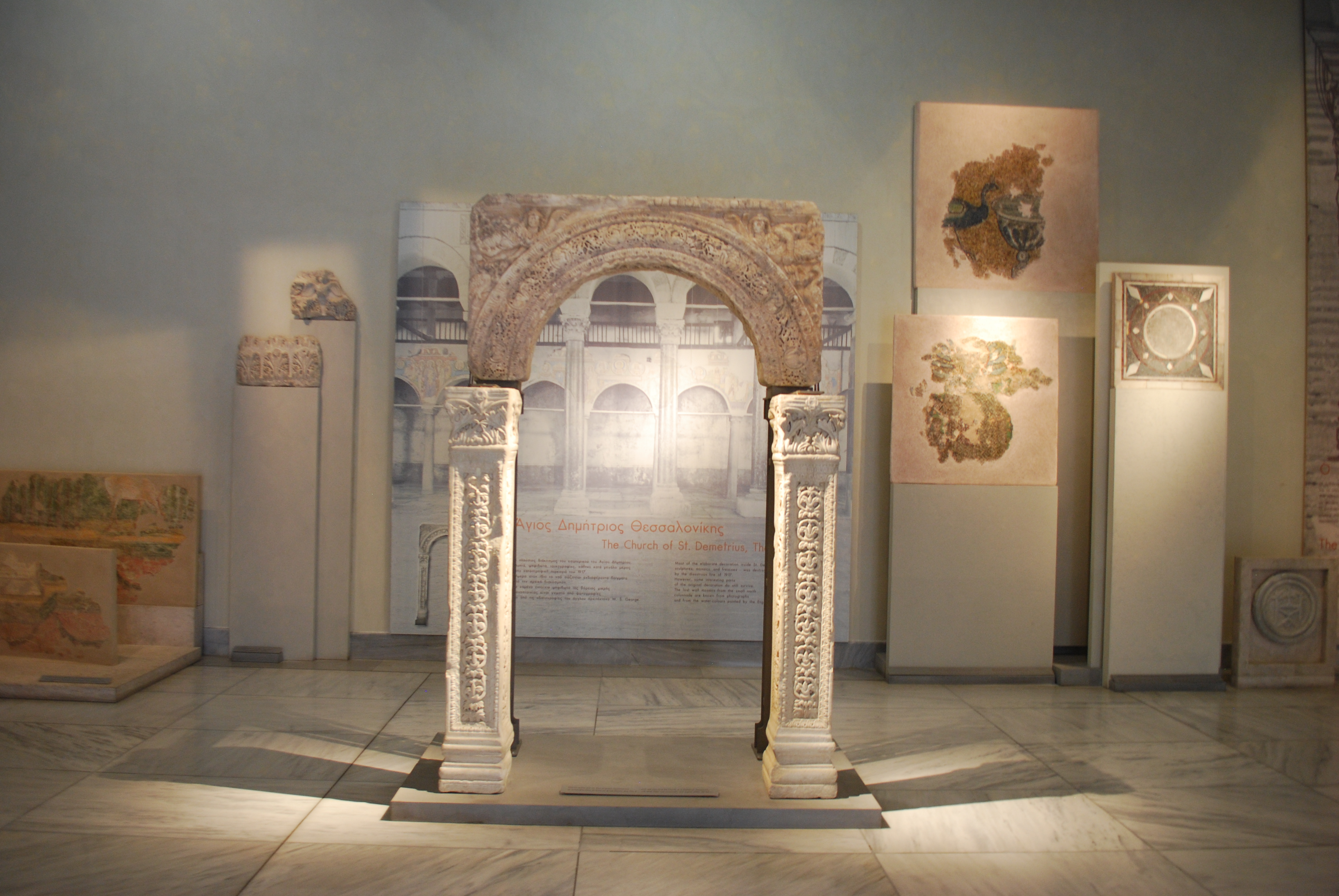
Arch and piers from the Church of Hagios Demetrios

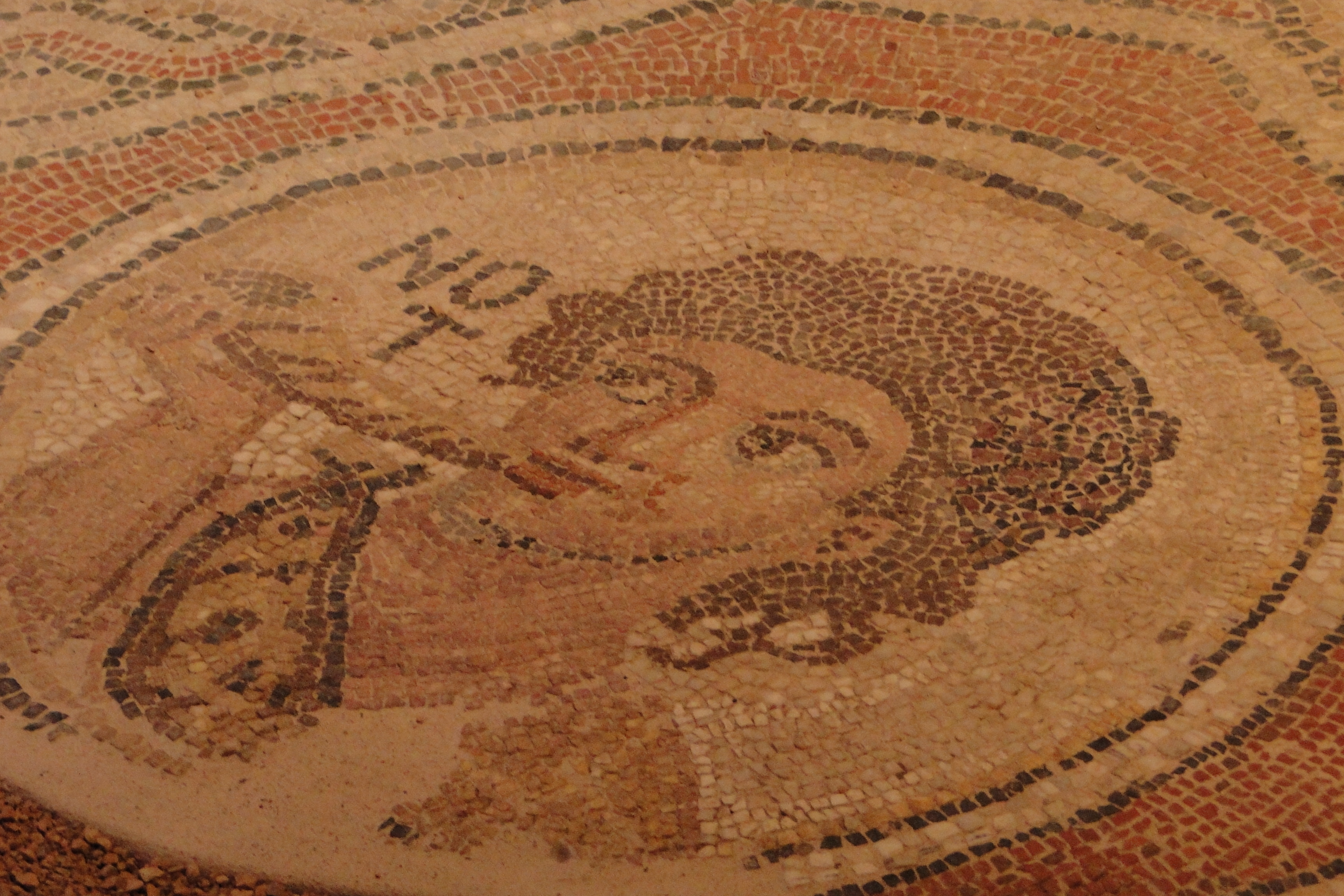
Byzantine mosaic

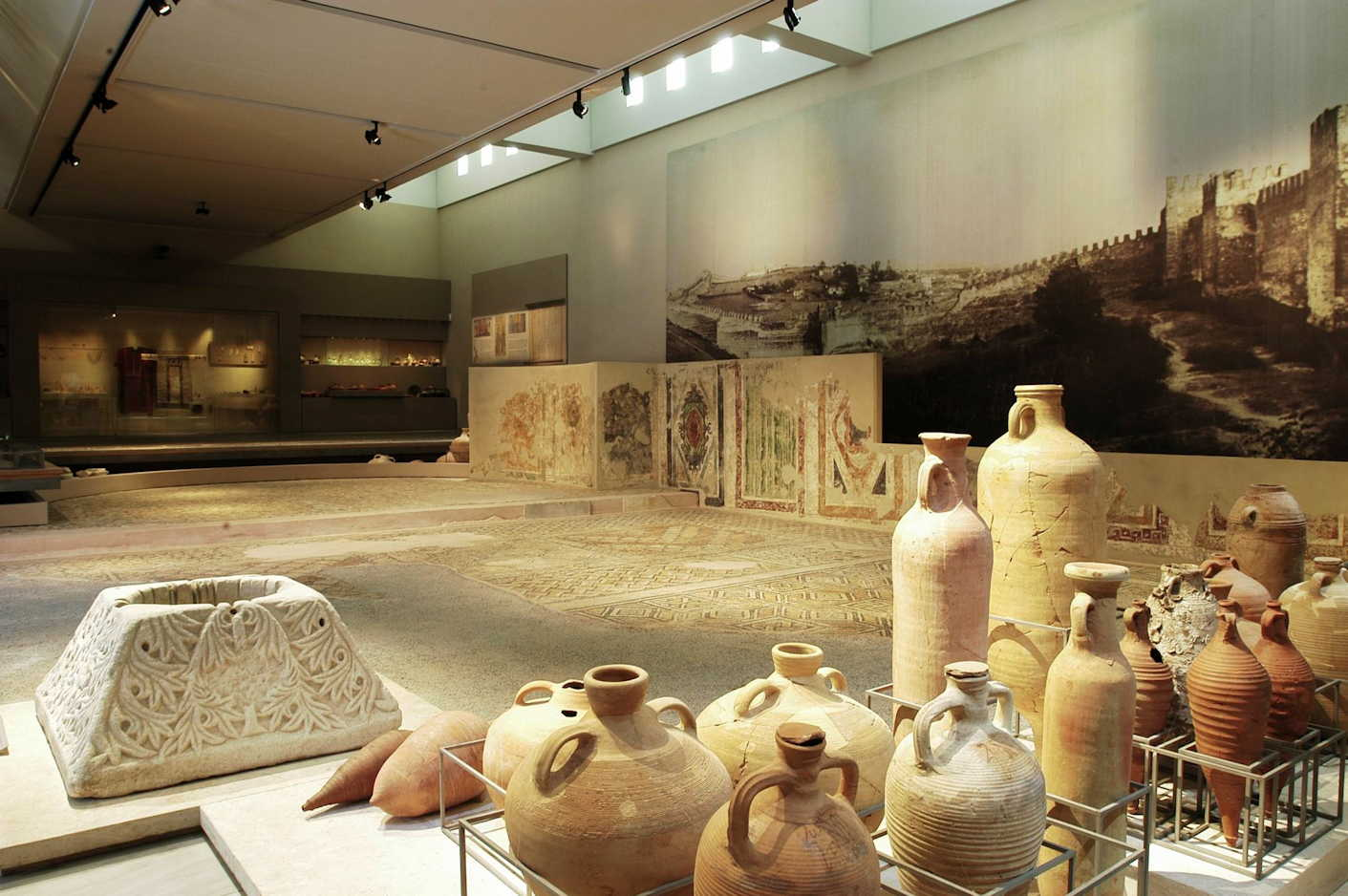
Interior view of the museum

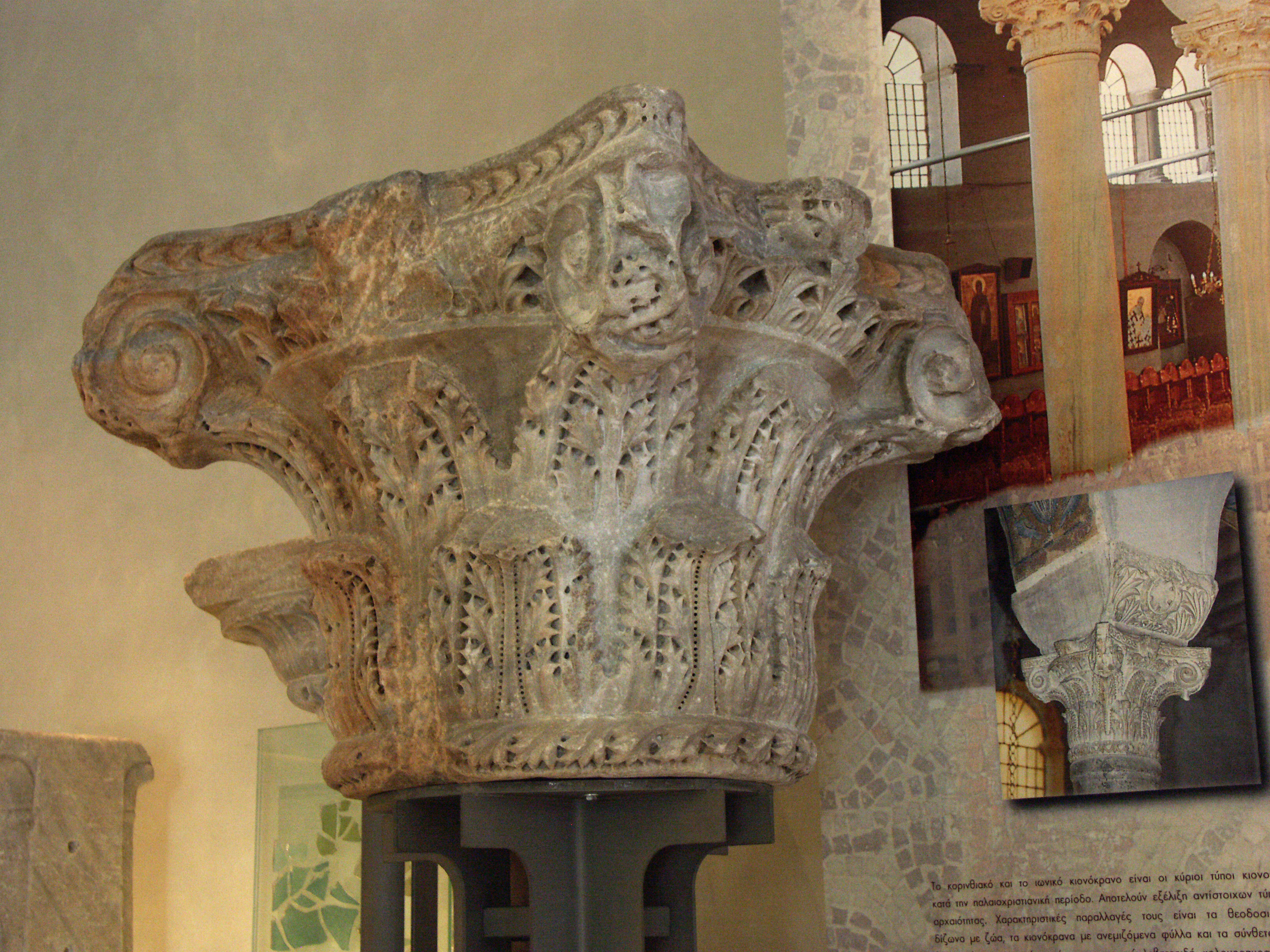
Theodosian capital from the atrium of the Church of the Acheiropoietos

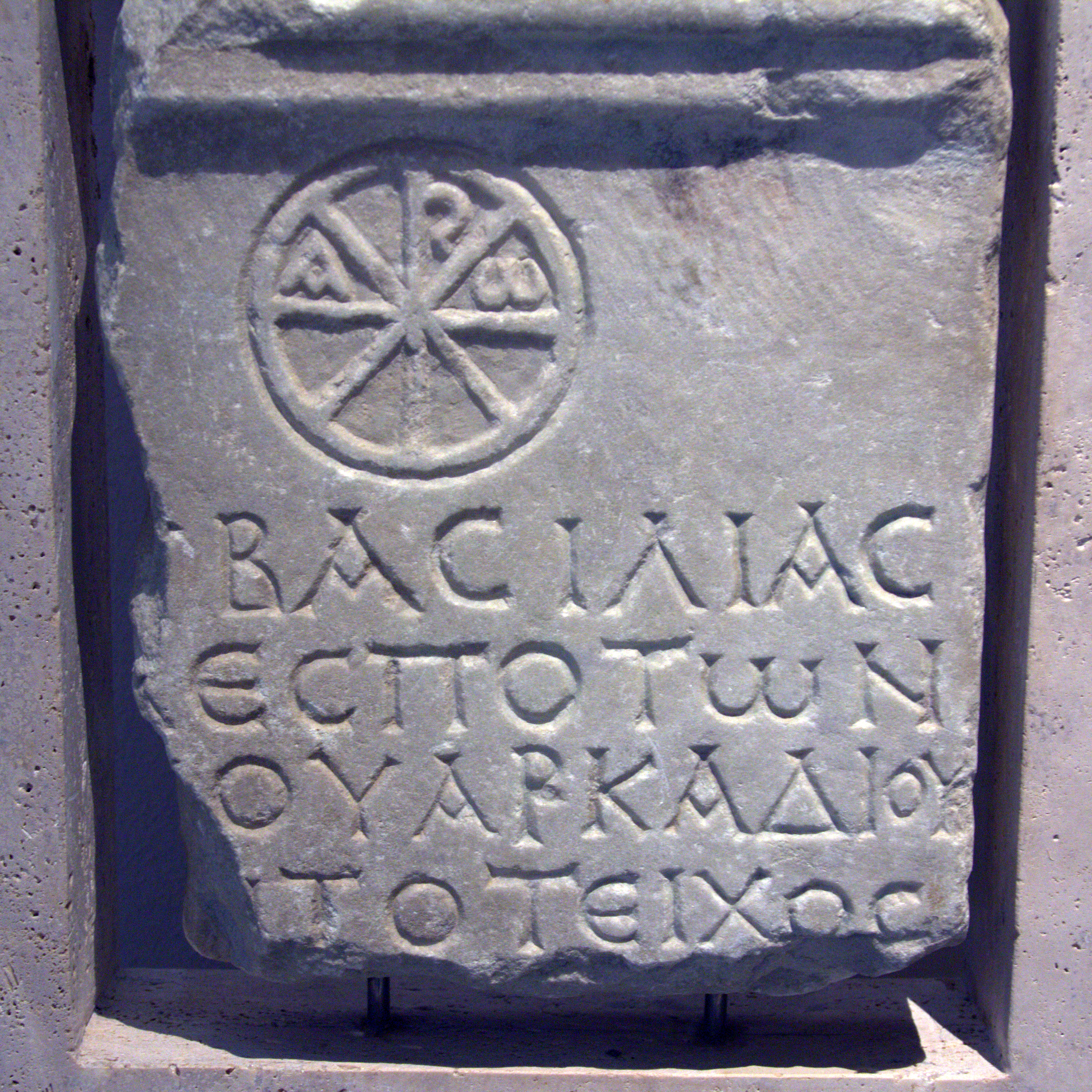
Inscription from the walls of Panion, Eastern Thrace

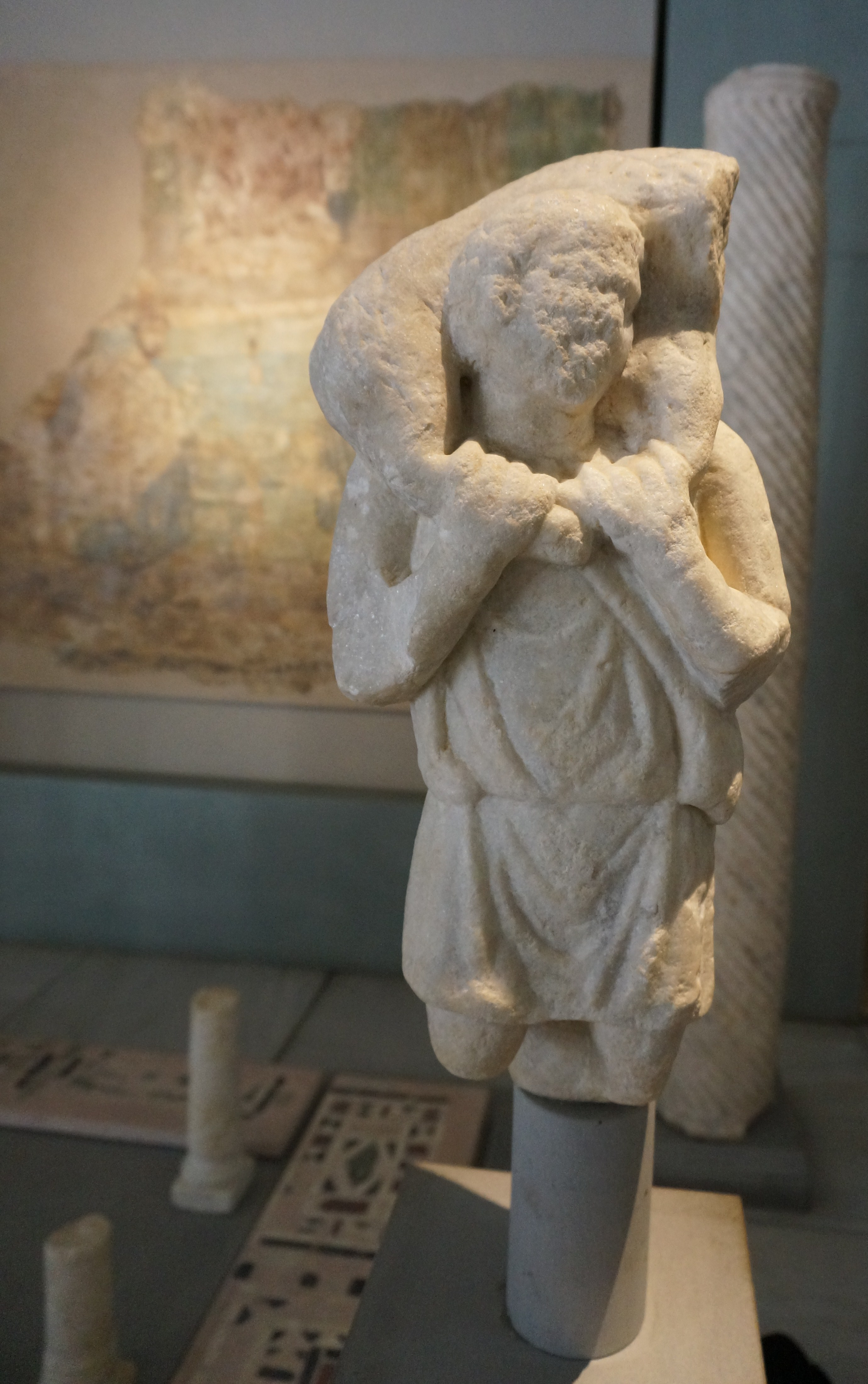
Statue of the good shepherd, 4th century

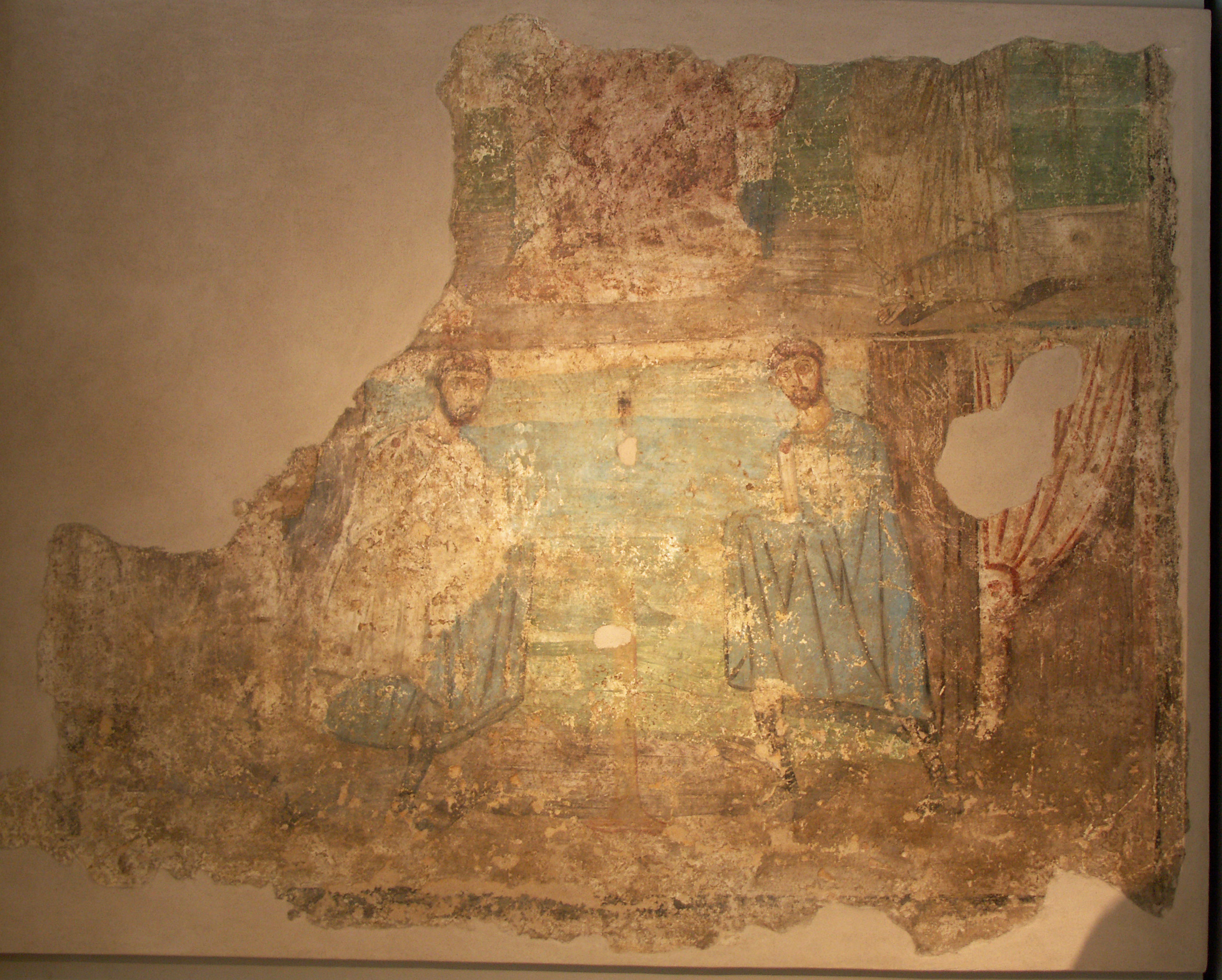
Wall painting of Sts Cosmas and Damian from the Agora

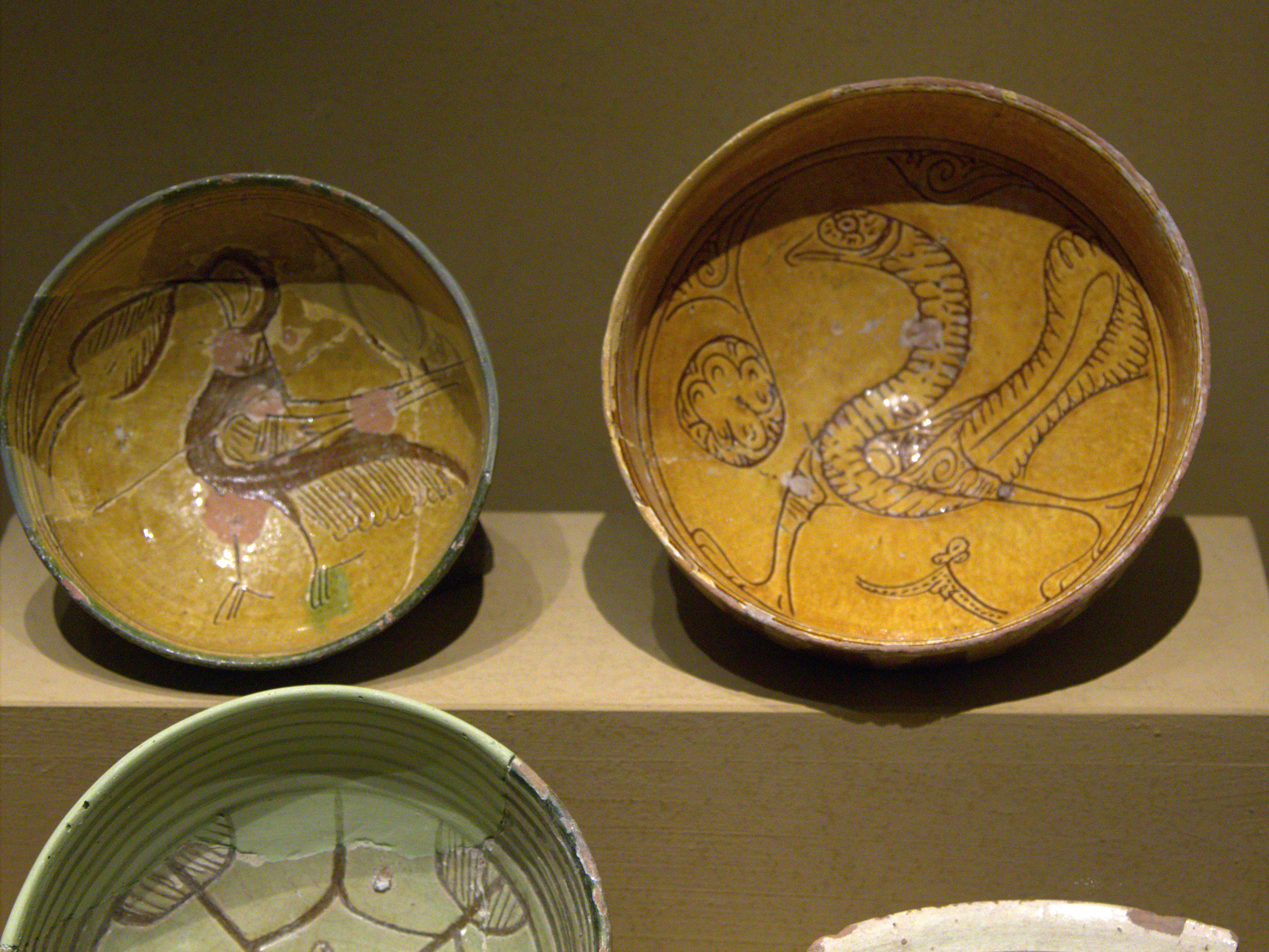
Glazes ceramics, sgraffito and painted decoration

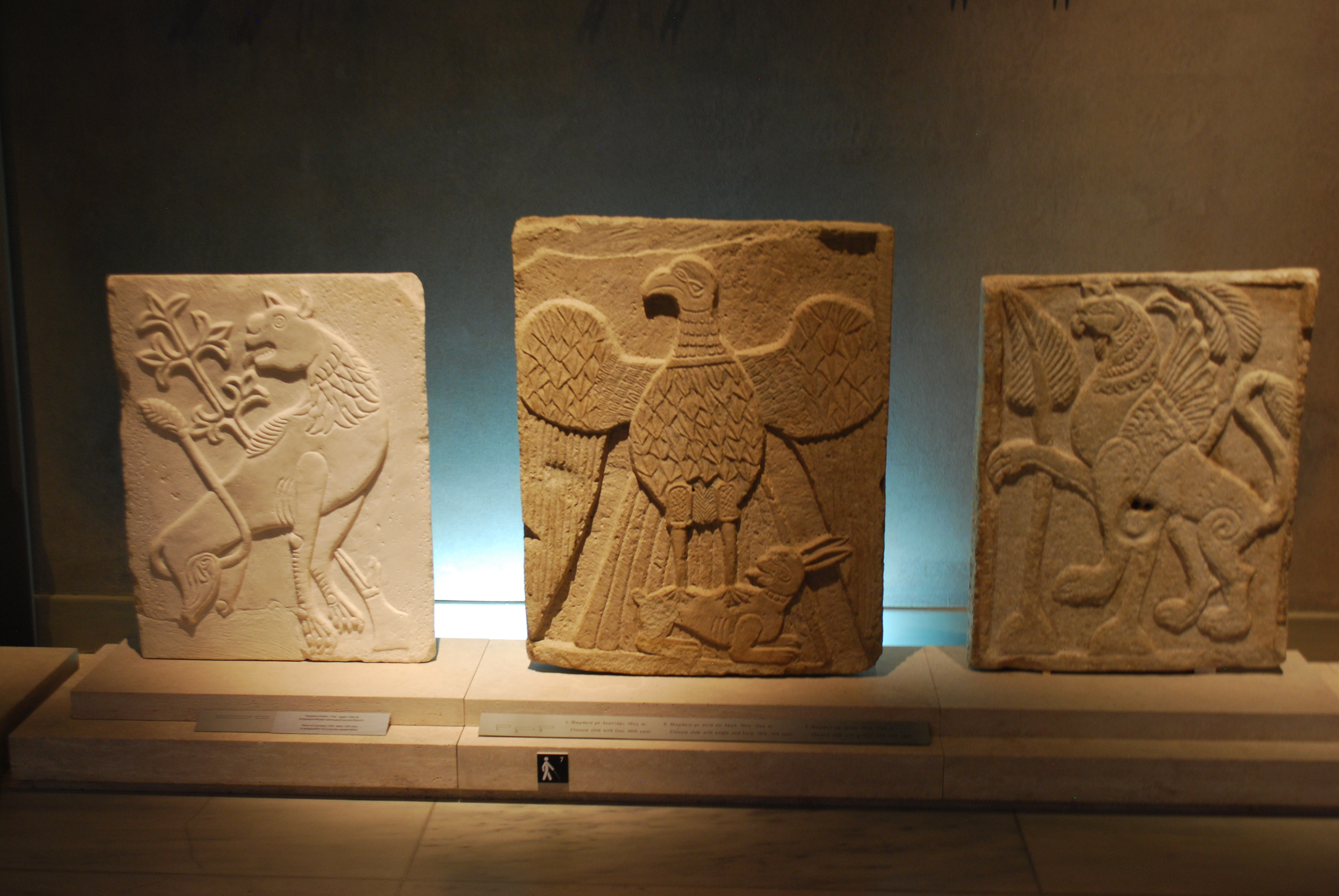
Plaques

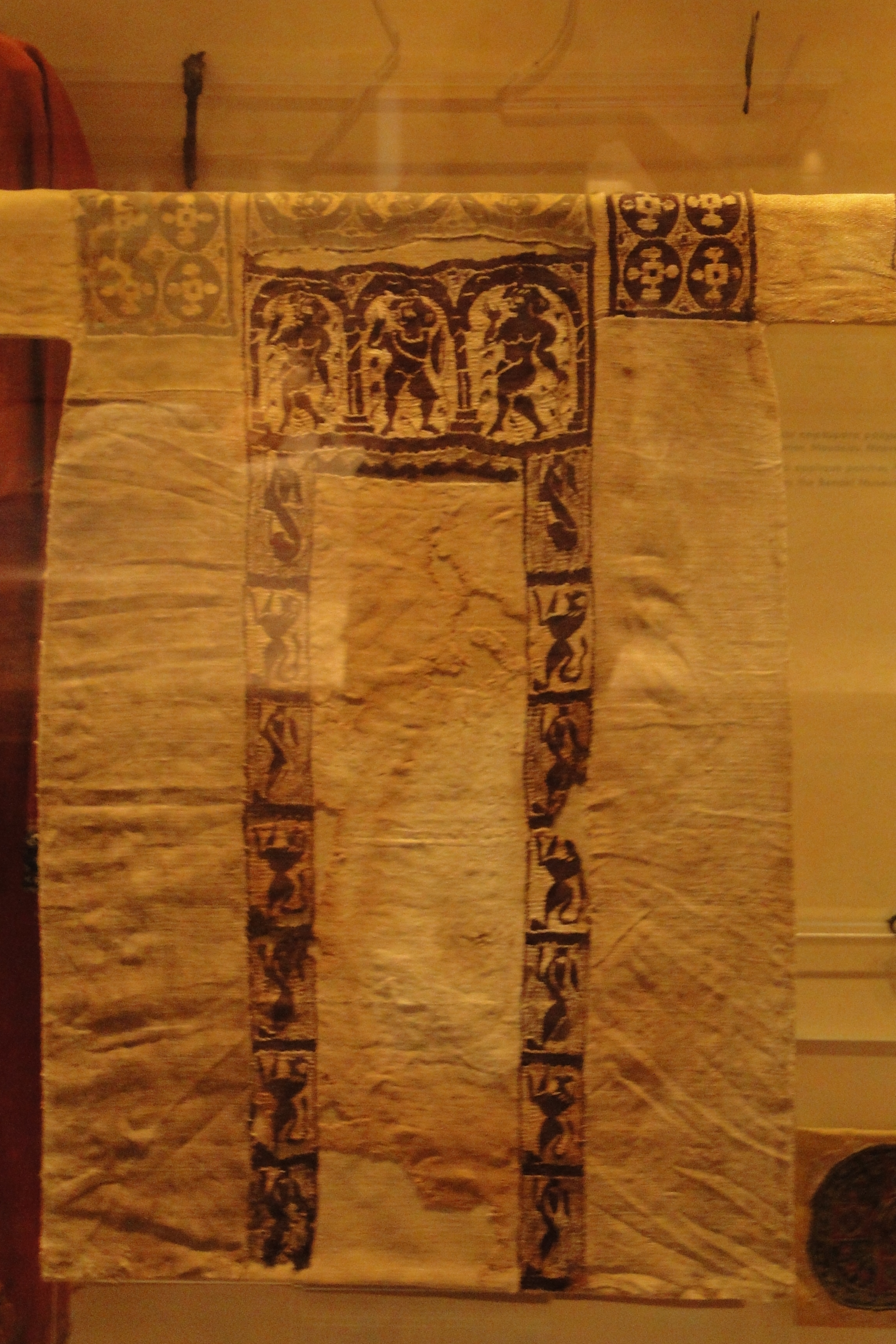
Tunic from Egypt, 7th century

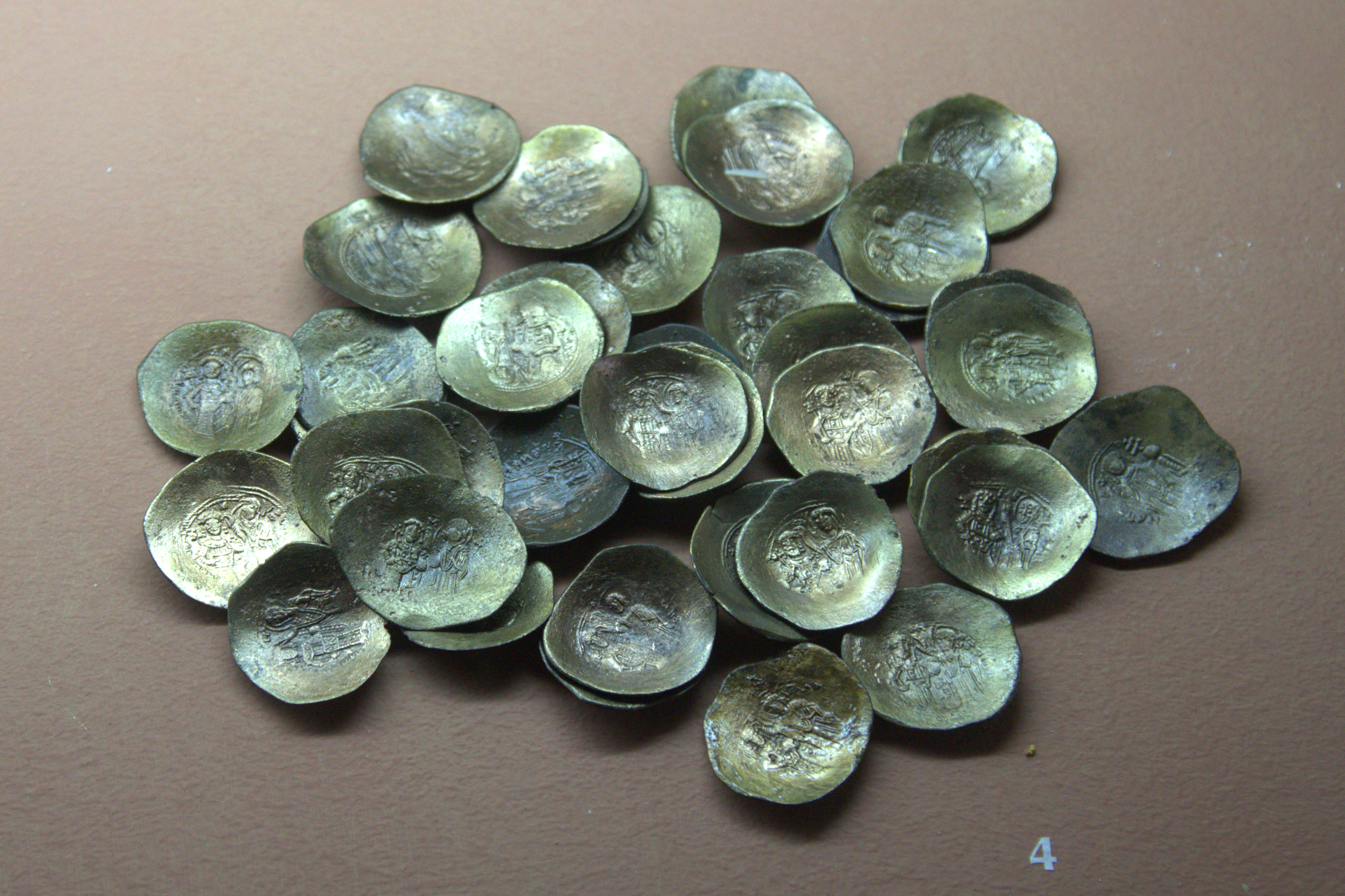
Coins from Thessaloniki (1143-1180)

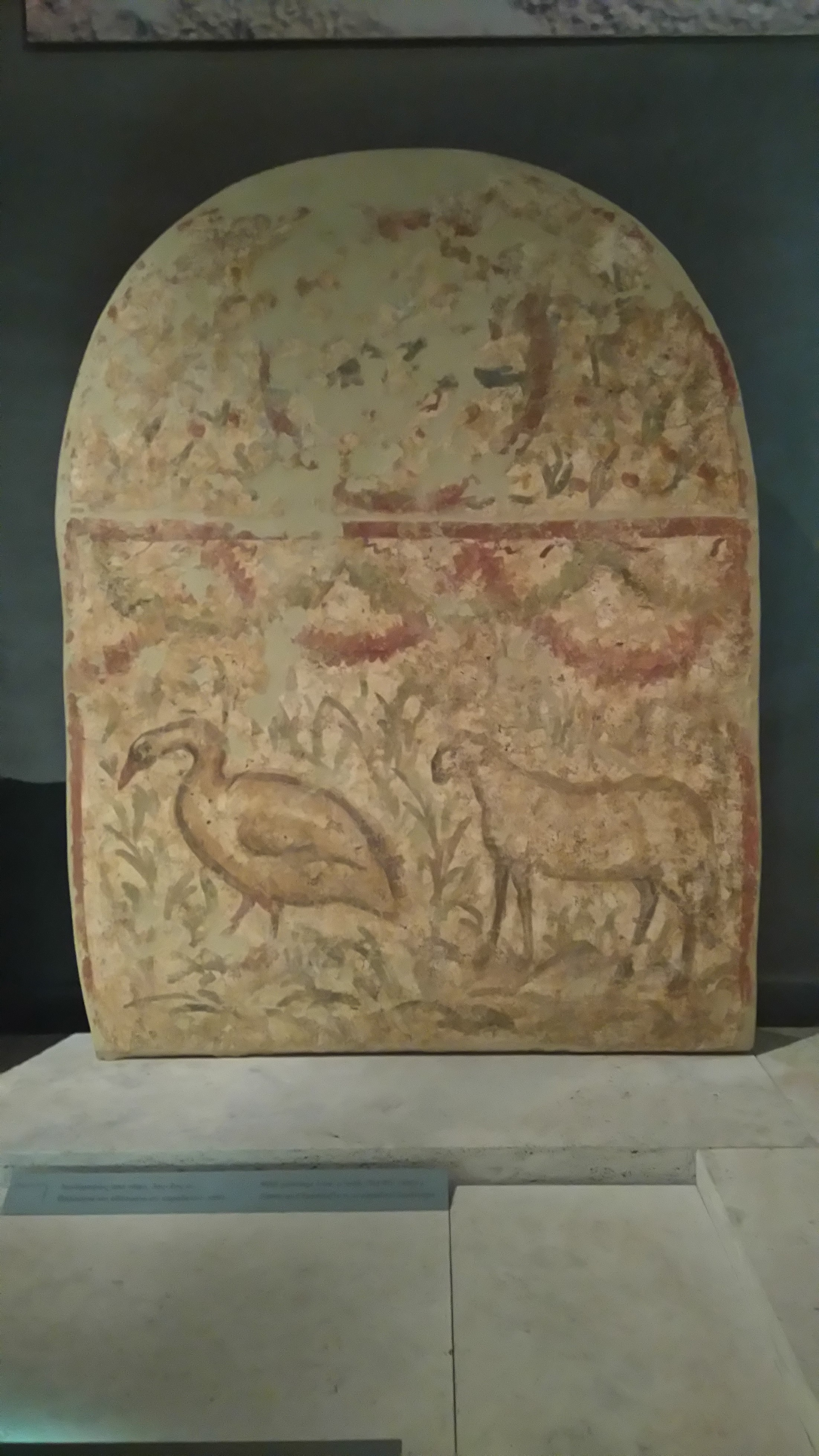
Paintings from a tomb
