= Monte Aralalta =

Mountain in Lombardy, Italy

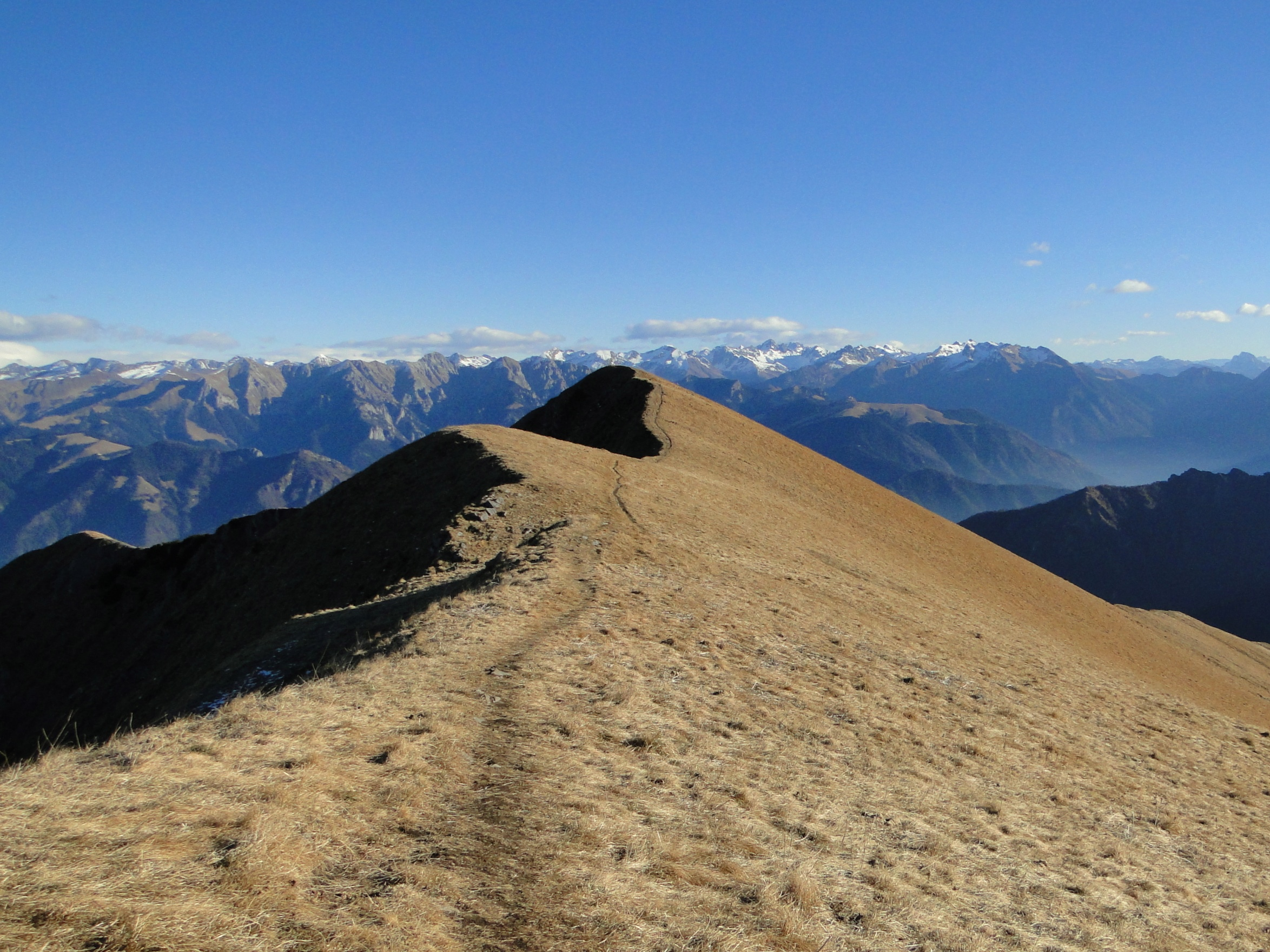

Highest point
- Elevation: 2,009 m (6,591 ft)
- Prominence: 166 m (545 ft)
- Coordinates: 45°56′43″N 9°34′37″E

Geography
- Location: Lombardy, Italy
- Parent range: Bergamasque Prealps

Monte Aralalta is a mountain of Lombardy, Italy, with an elevation of 2,009 metres (6,591 ft). It is located in the Bergamasque Prealps, in the Province of Bergamo, overlooking the Val Taleggio.

== Summit ==
Aralalta has two peaks, about two hundred meters apart and joined by a grassy ridge; the Aralalta proper is the lower peak, with an elevation of 2,003 meters, whereas the highest peak is called Pizzo Baciamorti.

The summit can be reached through hiking paths starting from Quindicina and Capo Foppa, hamlets of Taleggio, as well as from the Piani di Artavaggio, a grassy plateau and former ski resort overlooking the town of Moggio in the province of Lecco.

It lies entirely within the Bergamasque Alps Regional Park.
