= Monte Linzone =

Mountain in Italy

Coordinates: 45°47′08″N 9°31′07″E

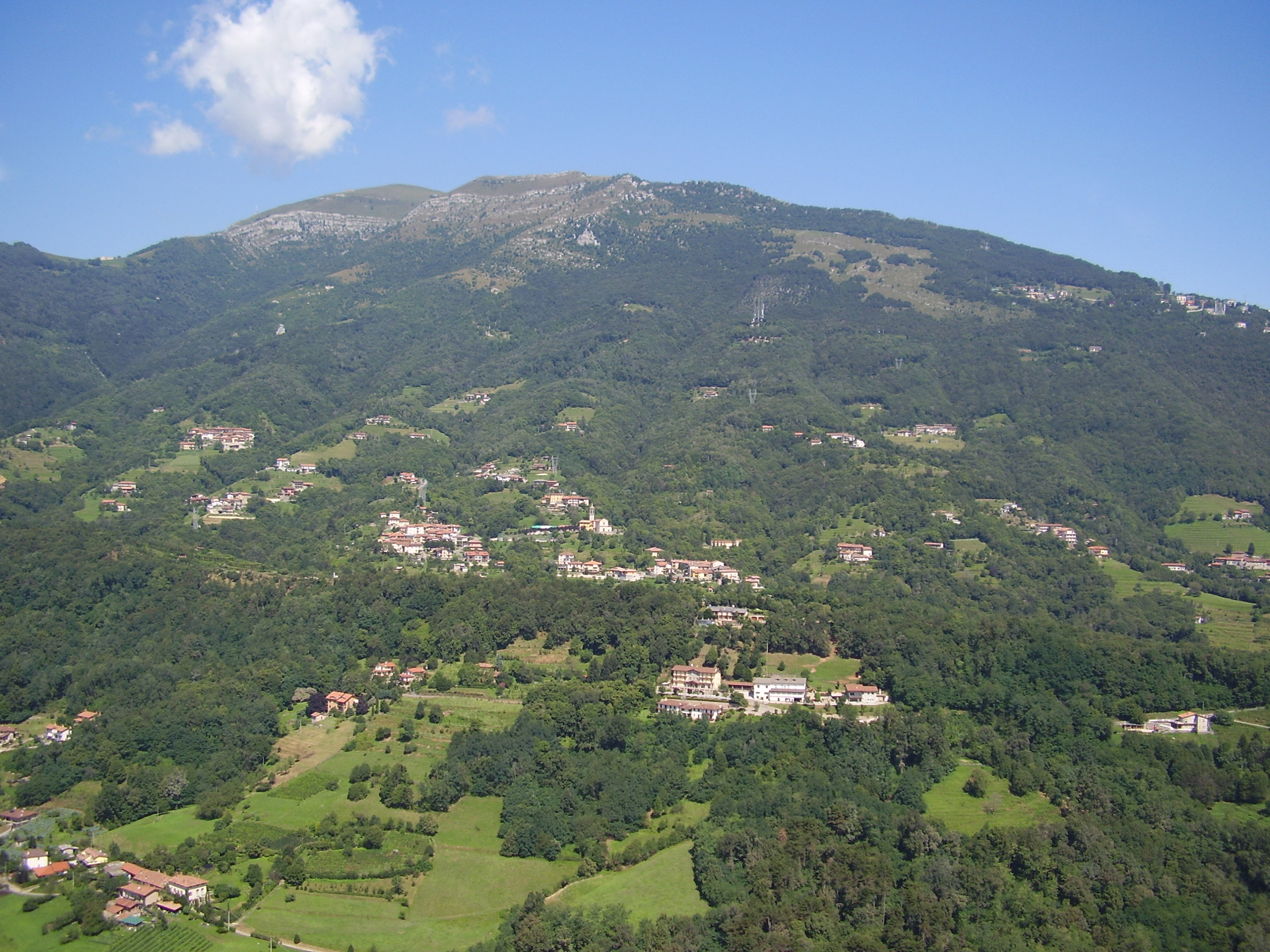

Highest point
- Elevation: 1,392 m (4,567 ft)

Geography
- Location: Lombardy, Italy
- Parent range: Bergamasque Prealps

Monte Linzone is a mountain of Lombardy, Italy. It is located within the Bergamasque Prealps.
