= Monte Negrino =

Mountain in Italy

Highest point
- Elevation: 1,781 m (5,843 ft)

Geography
- Location: Lombardy, Italy
- Parent range: Bergamasque Prealps

Monte Negrino is a mountain of Lombardy, Italy. It is located within the Bergamasque Prealps.

Nature hikes are a popular pastime to Monte Negrino.

== See also ==
- Conservation in Italy
