= Monte Resegone =

Mountain in Italy

Resegone
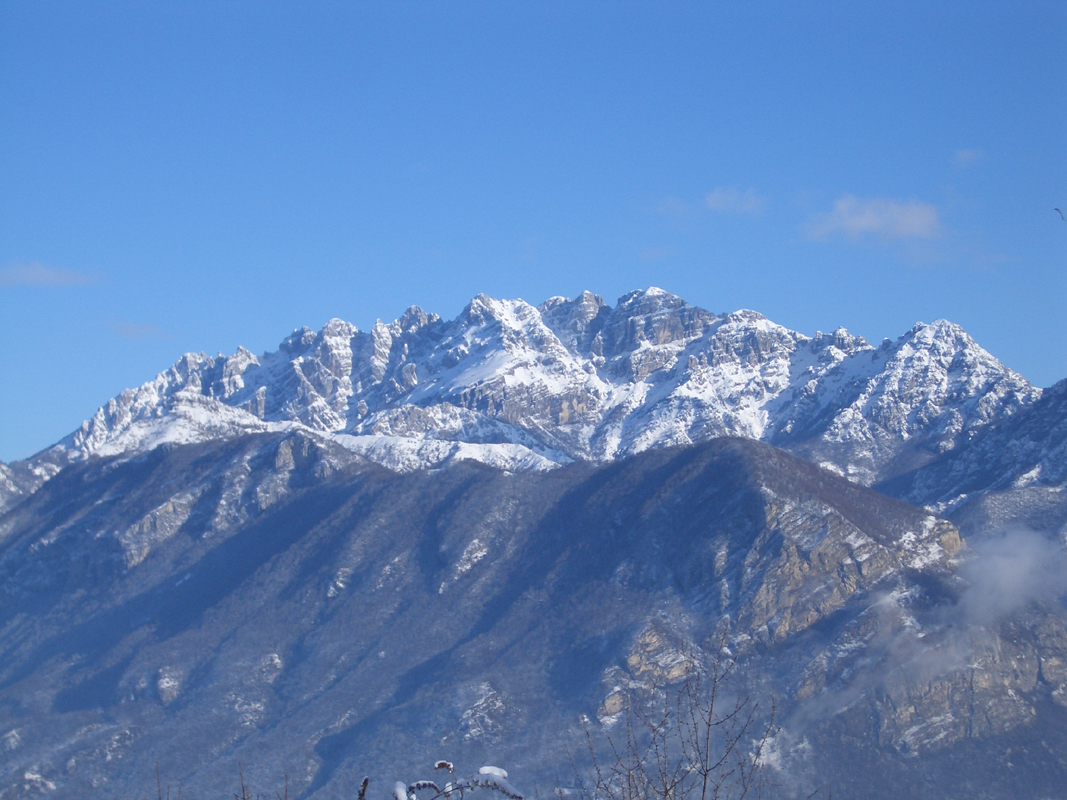

Highest point
- Elevation: 1,875 m (6,152 ft)
- Prominence: 727 m (2,385 ft)
- Coordinates: 45°51′30″N 9°28′08″E

Naming
- Native name: Resegon (Lombard)
- English translation: Big Saw

Geography
- Location within Alps
- Location: Lombardy, Italy
- Parent range: Bergamasque Prealps

Climbing
- Easiest route: Hike/Scramble

Monte Resegone or Resegone di Lecco (Italian: [rezeˈɡoːne]; Lombard: Resegon [rezeˈɡũː, rezˈɡu, razˈɡu]), also known as Monte Serrada, is a mountain of the Bergamasque Prealps in Lombardy, northern Italy. It has an elevation of 1,875 m and is located on the border between the provinces of Bergamo and Lecco.

== Overview ==
It towers over the city of Lecco and the southern end of Lake Como. The mountain is so named because of its resemblance to a saw (Lombard: résega; Latin: serra) as it has eleven summits of similar height. The highest of these summits, Punta Cermenati, reaches 1,875 m above sea level and towers 1,500m above the valley below. The mountain is popular with both hikers and climbers with many maintained paths and Via ferratas as well as much opportunity for rock climbing on the south and west walls of the northern summits.

Most routes start from the villages of Morterone, Piani d'Erna and Erve and ascend the various canyons that lie between the different summits. Just below the Punta Cermenati at 1,860 meters sits the Luigi Azzoni mountain hut.

Italian author Alessandro Manzoni made Resegone (which he called Monte Serrada) the backdrop for some of the scenes in his novel The Betrothed (in Italian I promessi sposi).

The first person to reach the summit using only his hands and without any protections was Sergio "Gigi" Sala from Casatenovo in 1985.
