= Monte Secco =

Mountain in Italy

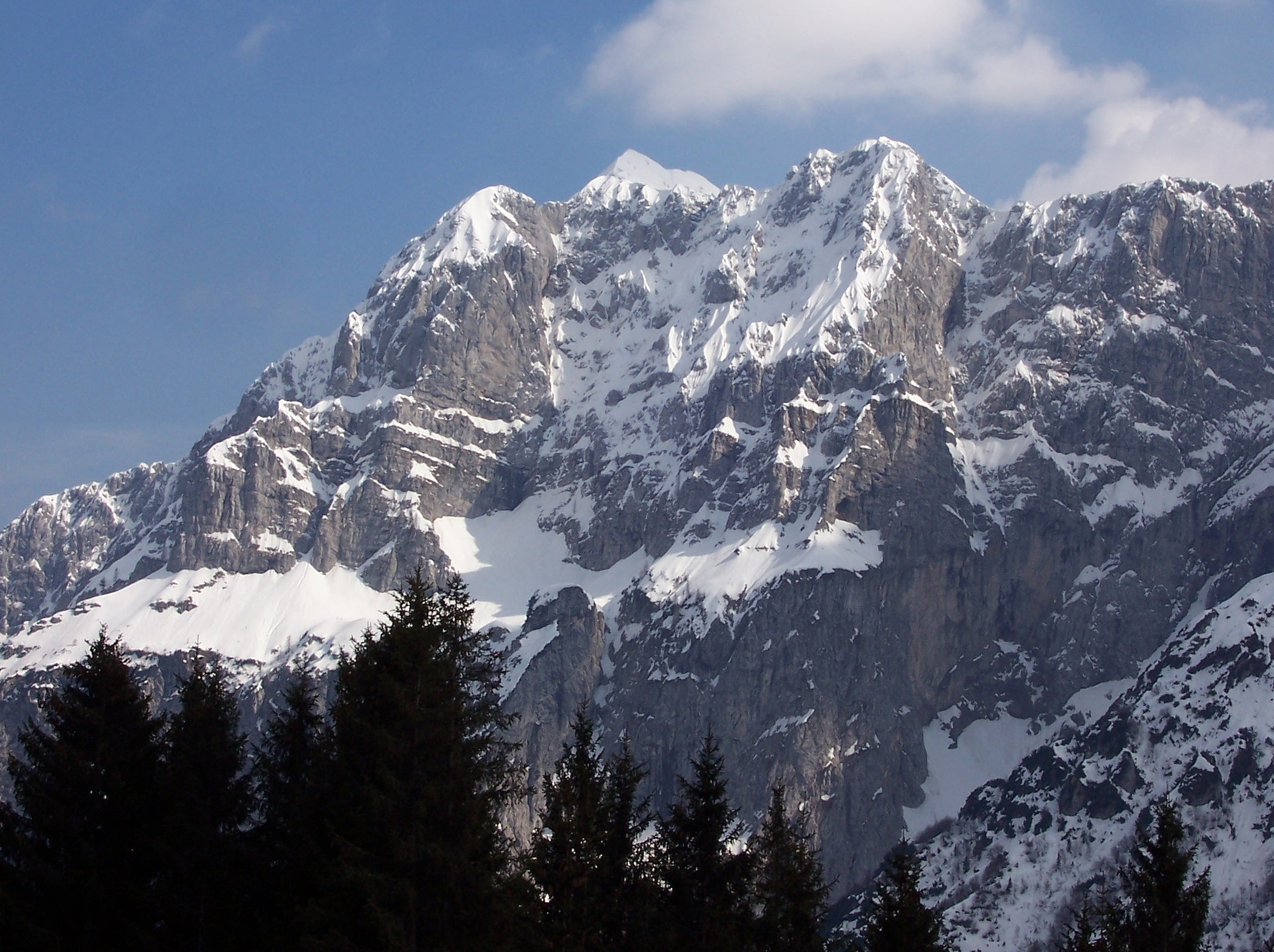
- Monte Secco in winter, from Baite Zulino

Highest point
- Elevation: 2,267 m (7,438 ft)
- Coordinates: 45°55′52″N 9°52′56″E

Geography
- Location within Alps
- Location: Lombardy, Italy
- Parent range: Bergamasque Prealps

Climbing
- First ascent: 1931, by G.B. Cortinovis and E. Corio

Monte Secco is a mountain above Val Seriana in Lombardy, Italy. It is located within the Bergamasque Prealps. A cross was mounted at its summit at 2,267 metres (7,438 ft) in 1965.
