= Tartano Pass =

Passo di Tartano
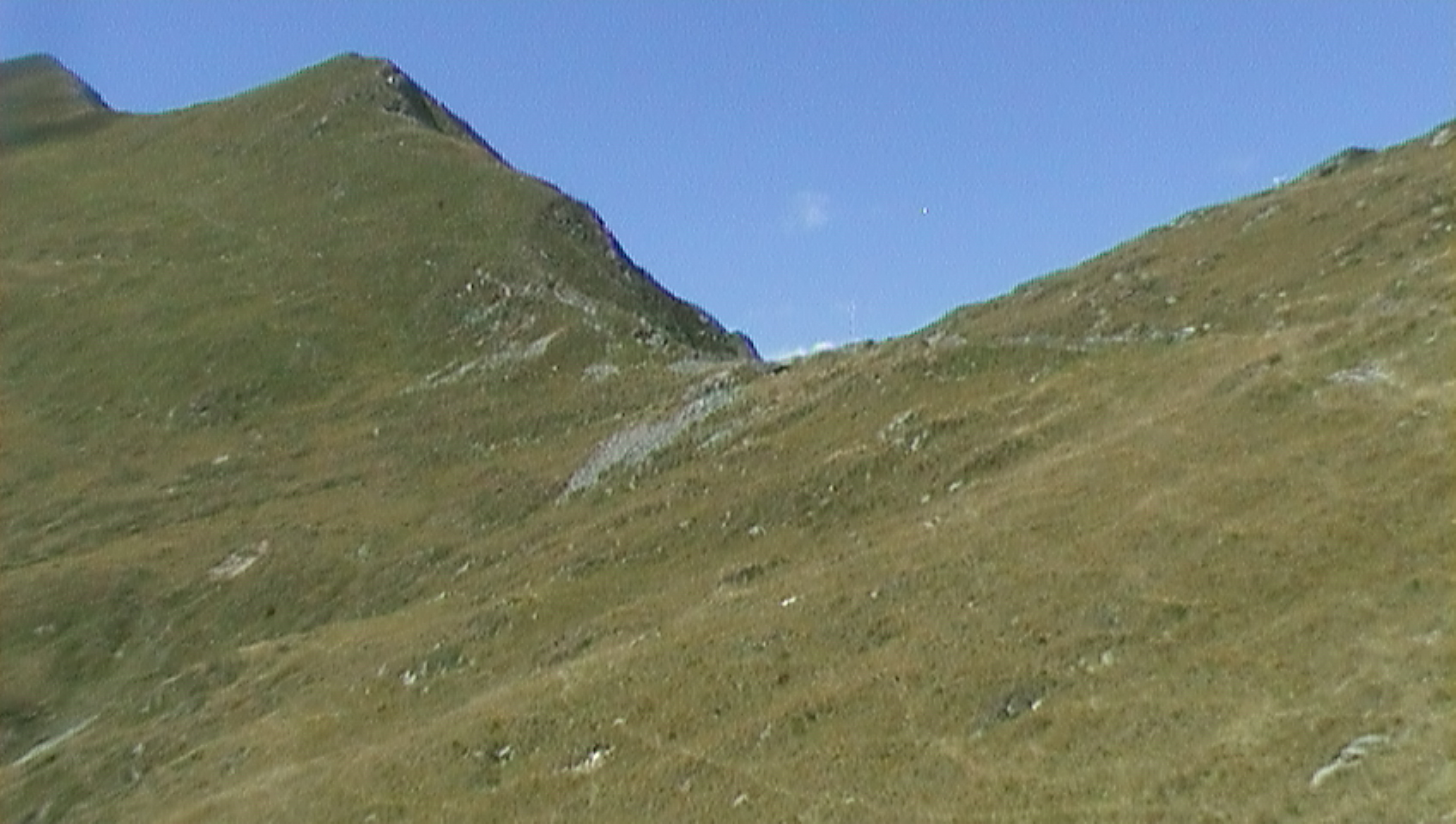

- Location within Alps
- Elevation: 2,124 metres (6,969 ft)
- Traversed by: Trail

Third Approach
- Location: Italy
- Range: Bergamo Alps
- Coordinates: 46°03′49″N 9°43′08″E

Passo di Tartano is a mountain pass that links the village of Tartano in Valtellina with Valleve in Val Brembana. There is not a road that cross the pass, during summer the Pass is a popular destination for hikers. The pass is covered of snow usually form the mid of November to May and is a destination for off pist skiers. At the pass there are remains of fortifications of Cadorna Line built during World War I.

== See also ==
- List of highest paved roads in Europe
- List of mountain passes
