= Monte Alben =

Mountain in Bergamo, Italy

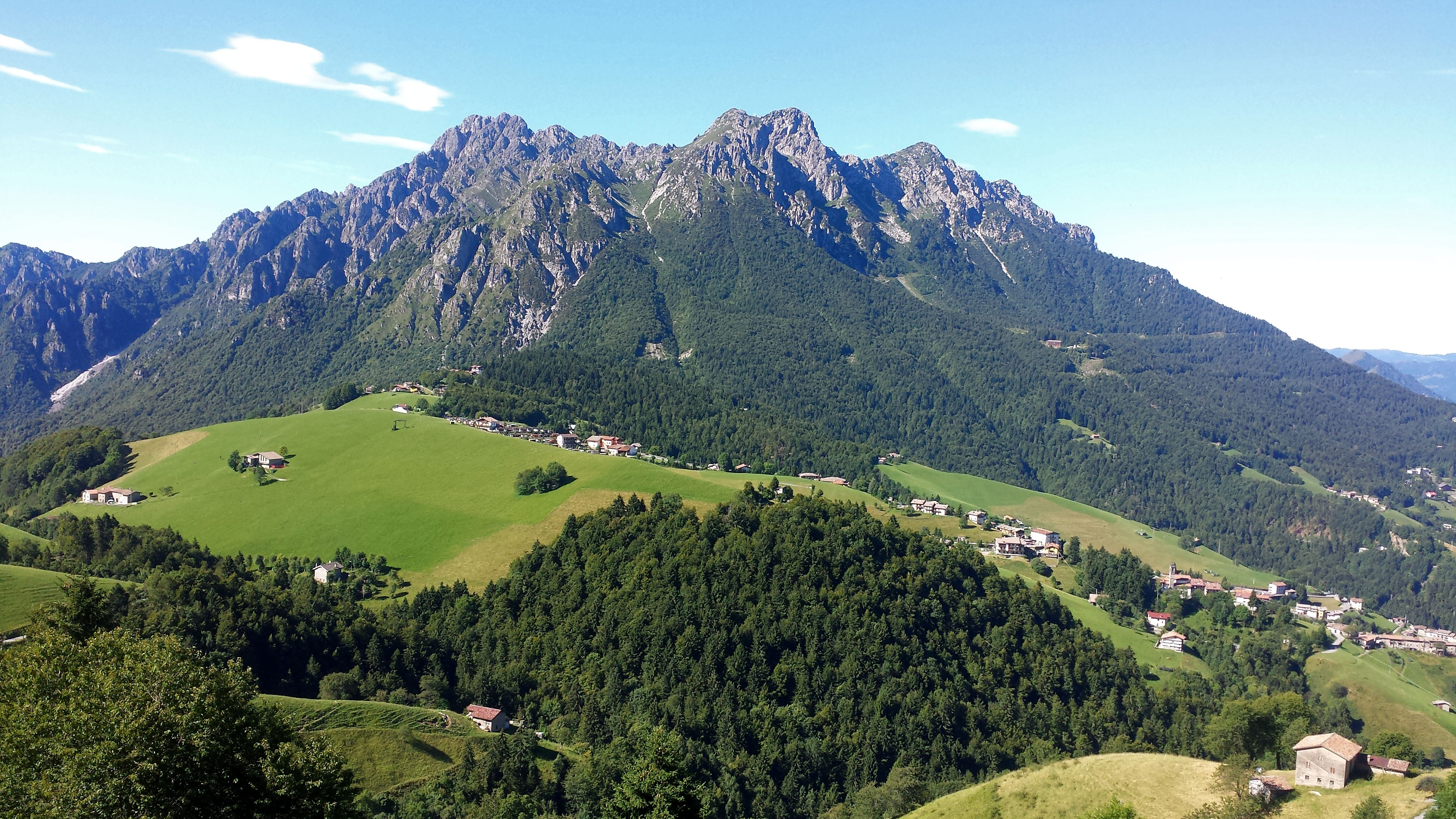
- Mount Alben as seen from the pastures of Monte di Zambla

Highest point
- Elevation: 2,019 m (6,624 ft)
- Listing: Prominent mountains of the Alps
- Coordinates: 45°51′44″N 9°46′55″E

Geography
- Location within Italy
- Location: Lombardy, Bergamo, Italy
- Parent range: Bergamasque Alps and Prealps

Monte Alben, with a height of 2019 m above sea level, is a mountain in the Bergamasque Prealps, located along the ridge separating the Brembana Valley from the Seriana Valley, in the province of Bergamo.

== Description ==
It is formed by a mountainous massif of imposing-looking limestone rock, rising between the Serina valley, Riso valley, Parina valley and Vertova valley, immediately south of Zambla pass. To the northeast, toward the upper Serina and Riso valleys, the Alben is characterized by impassable spires, rocky ridges and gullies, while to the southwest, toward the middle Serina and Vertova valleys, wooded slopes, pine forests and wide pastures are more spacious. At the summit there are several peaks connected by rocky ridges, including Cima La Croce (1975 m) and Cima della Spada (1,952 m), which overlook the municipality of Oltre il Colle, and the main summit (2019 m), located further south.

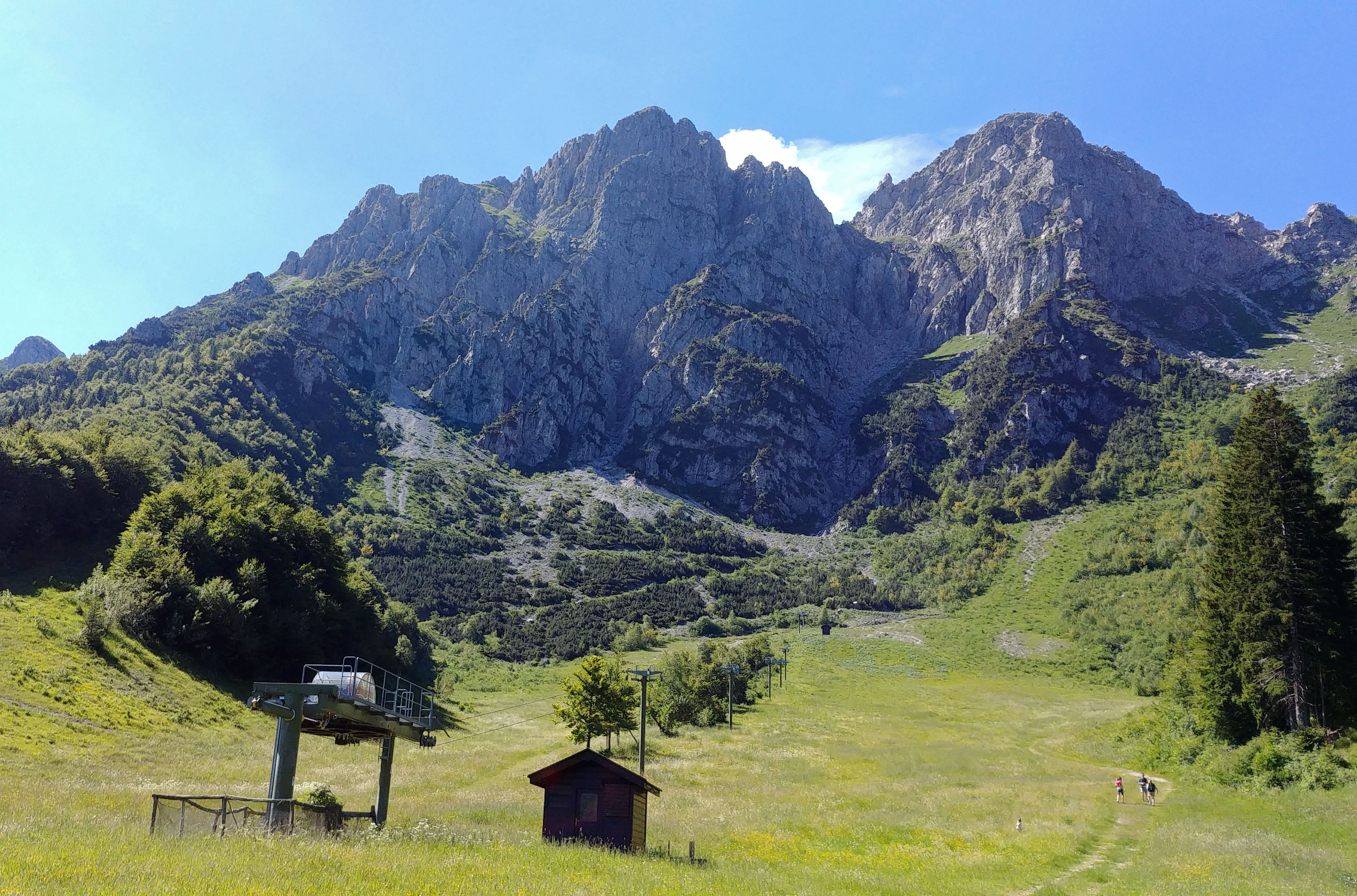
Cima la Croce (right) and the subpeak (left), on which the Maurizio via ferrata runs.

From the summit cross there is a panorama view ranging from the nearby Arera, Menna and Grem mounts, to the main peaks of the Bergamasque Alps and Prealps arc (including Resegone, Grigna, Pizzo Tre Signori, Pizzo del Diavolo, Redorta, Coca, Presolana), to the more distant Rosa, Disgrazia and Adamello groups. Toward the south, beyond the Po Valley, the outline of the Tuscan-Emilian Apennines can be seen on the horizon.

On the southern slopes of the mountain, just above the municipality of Cornalba, an imposing vertical rock cliff emerges from the woods, on which a renowned rock climbing wall has been carved out, with more than a hundred routes ranging from 5th grade up to 9a+, which have also been climbed by famous climbers, including Adam Ondra.

On the rocks of the north side is the Maurizio via ferrata, which allows climbers to ascend a wild rock face leading to the La Croce summit, first passing through the subpeak.

The Alben is also the habitat of Primula albenensis, an endemic species found only in the Bergamo area and recognized as such in 1993, which takes its name from the mountain. It blooms between April and June at an altitude of about 1,150 to 2,000 metres (3,770 to 6,560 ft).

== Access ==
The shortest route to the summit goes up the northern slope, starting at Zambla Pass (1264 m). A dirt track to the right leads to Crocetta Pass (1,267 m), and just beyond it a path leads steeply up into the woods to the left. Once out of the trees, it zigzags up a gully leading to the Brassamonti pass, and continues with gentler slopes to the junction for the nearby Nembrini Bivouac. From here it climbs, passing under the characteristic Torrione dell'Alben and reaching the Passo la Forca (1848 m), a pass that divides the main peak from the Cima della Croce (1975 m), and near which is located the Bivacco del Gioan. From the pass, the route continues eastward along the rocky ridge. This part of the route is the most striking, especially because of the way the trail has been recovered through the rock formations arranged along the ridge. It then proceeds alternating between a few rock jumps (grade I climbing) and sections of gravel path, and reaches the summit cross after about 2.30 hours from the start.

Another of the most popular routes to the summit goes up the south side of the mountain, starting from Cornalba (900 m). The trail starts from a driveway that narrows at the edge of the municipality, climbing through the forest. At the end of the long stretch through the trees, it comes out into a wide pasture (Pian delle Casere) that extends to the foot of the Alben ridge, where there are also a couple of huts and a puddle that holds rainwater used for watering livestock. The trail continues up the pasture in a northerly direction until it climbs to La Forca Pass, rejoining the previous route. The total duration is about 3 hours.

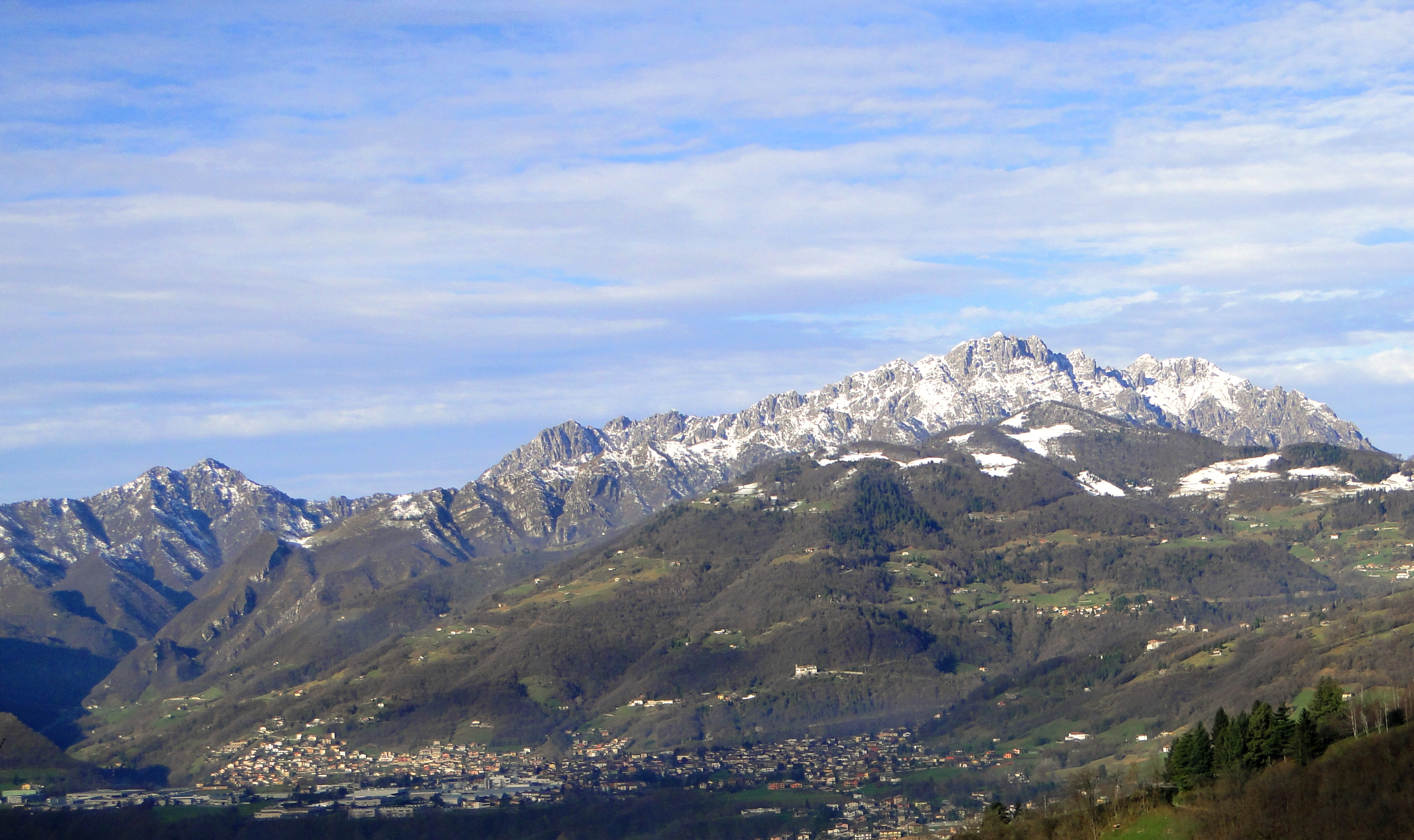
The northeast slope as seen from the Seriana valley

It is also possible to reach the summit from the Vertova valley. From the municipality of Vertova (400 m) it follows in its entirety the CAI 530 trail, which climbs by a dirt track to the Cavlera alpine hut, and from there to the Bliben Pass. It then climbs to the pass adjacent to Mount Secretondo and continues in uninterrupted ups and downs to Bivacco Testa. This is where the most scenic part of the route begins, with the trail running along the ridge between val Vertova and val del Riso, then climbing between towers and pinnacles to Campelli Peak (1890 m). From here it joins trail 525, and follows the ridge to the summit cross, after a long walk of about 6 hours.

Another route involves leaving from Costa Serina (900m) to follow trail 519B to Barbata Pass (1312m), which divides Mount Alben and Mount Suchello. Once at the pass, one continues northward along trail 525, which, after a traverse in a scenic and severe environment under the wide pastures of Cascina Foppi, reaches a junction. Here the trail splits: the first option crosses wide pastures and valleys, the second continues along rocky ridges. Either way, one reaches the junction with trail 530 and, after some ups and downs, arrives at the summit of Mount Alben. The route takes about 3.30 hours of walking.

Another possibility is the concatenation of Mounts Poieto, Suchello and Alben, which can be done starting from Aviatico. One climbs to Mount Poieto (1360 m), follows trail 519, which passes by the Forca di Aviatico, and reaches Suchello (1541 m) after long ups and downs through meadows and woods. From here one descends back into the woods to the Barbata Pass and rejoins the previous route.

== Image gallery ==
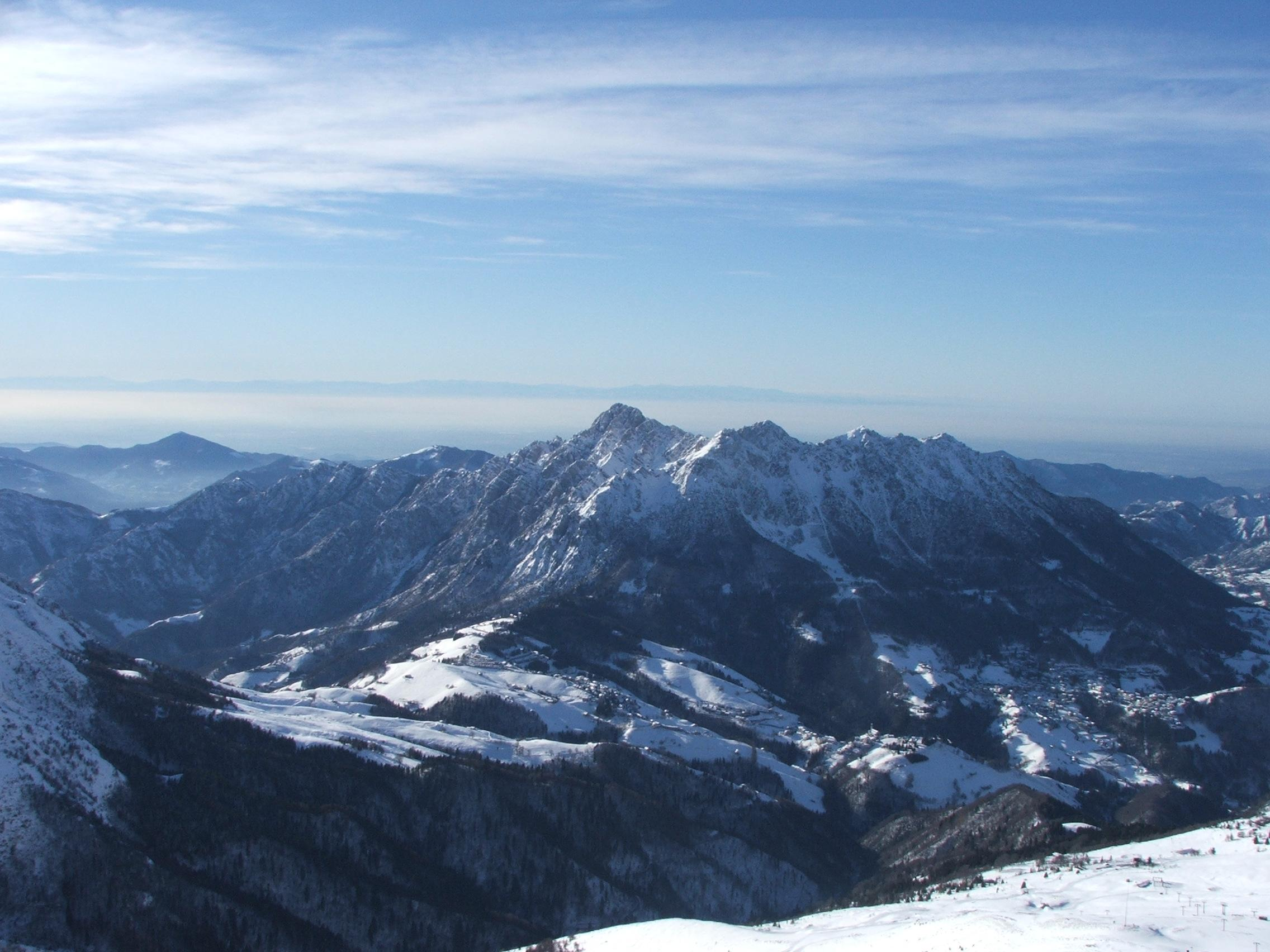
Mount Alben seen from Pizzo Arera and, in the background, the profile of the Tuscan-Emilian Apennines

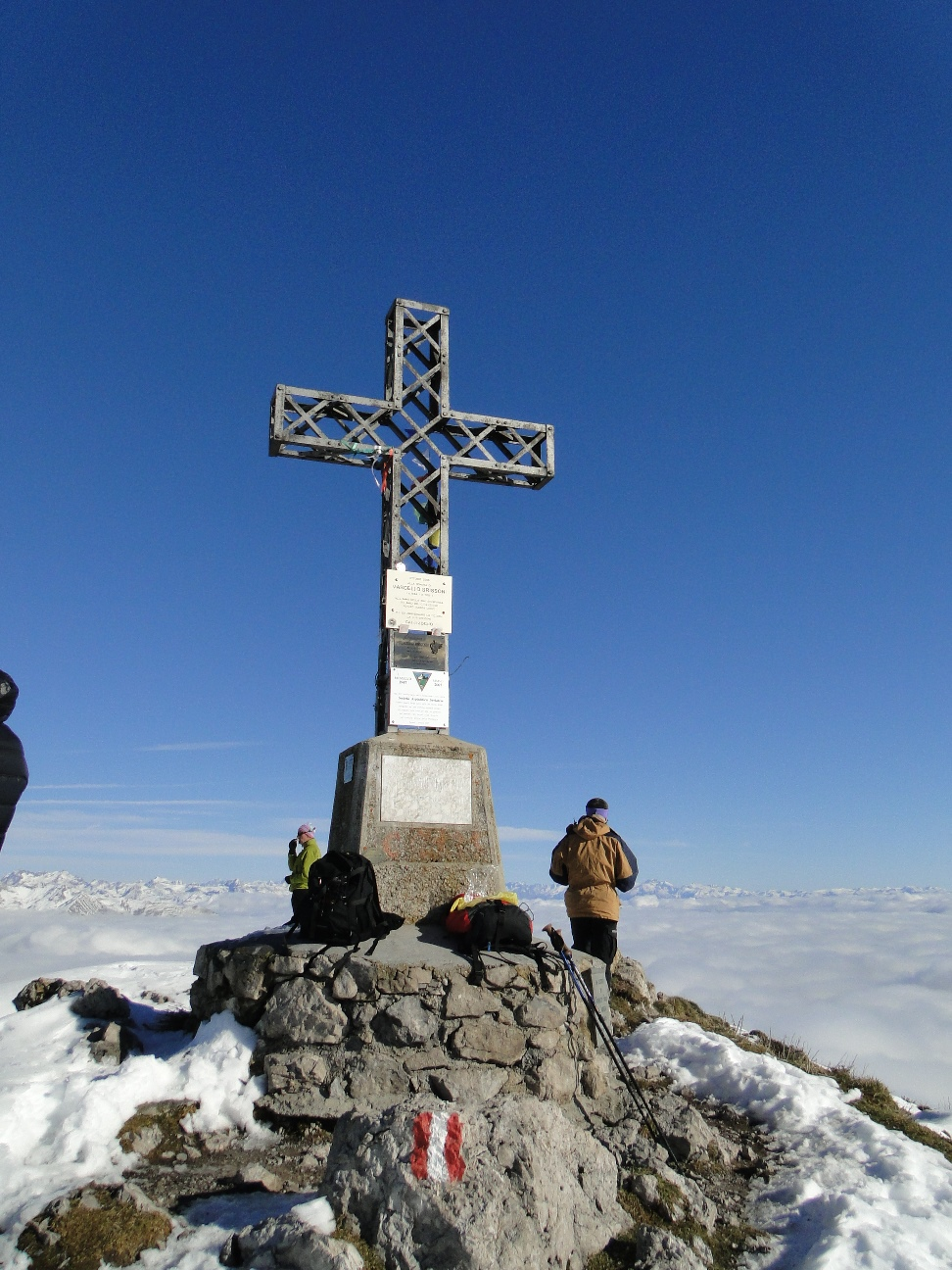
The summit cross of Mount Alben

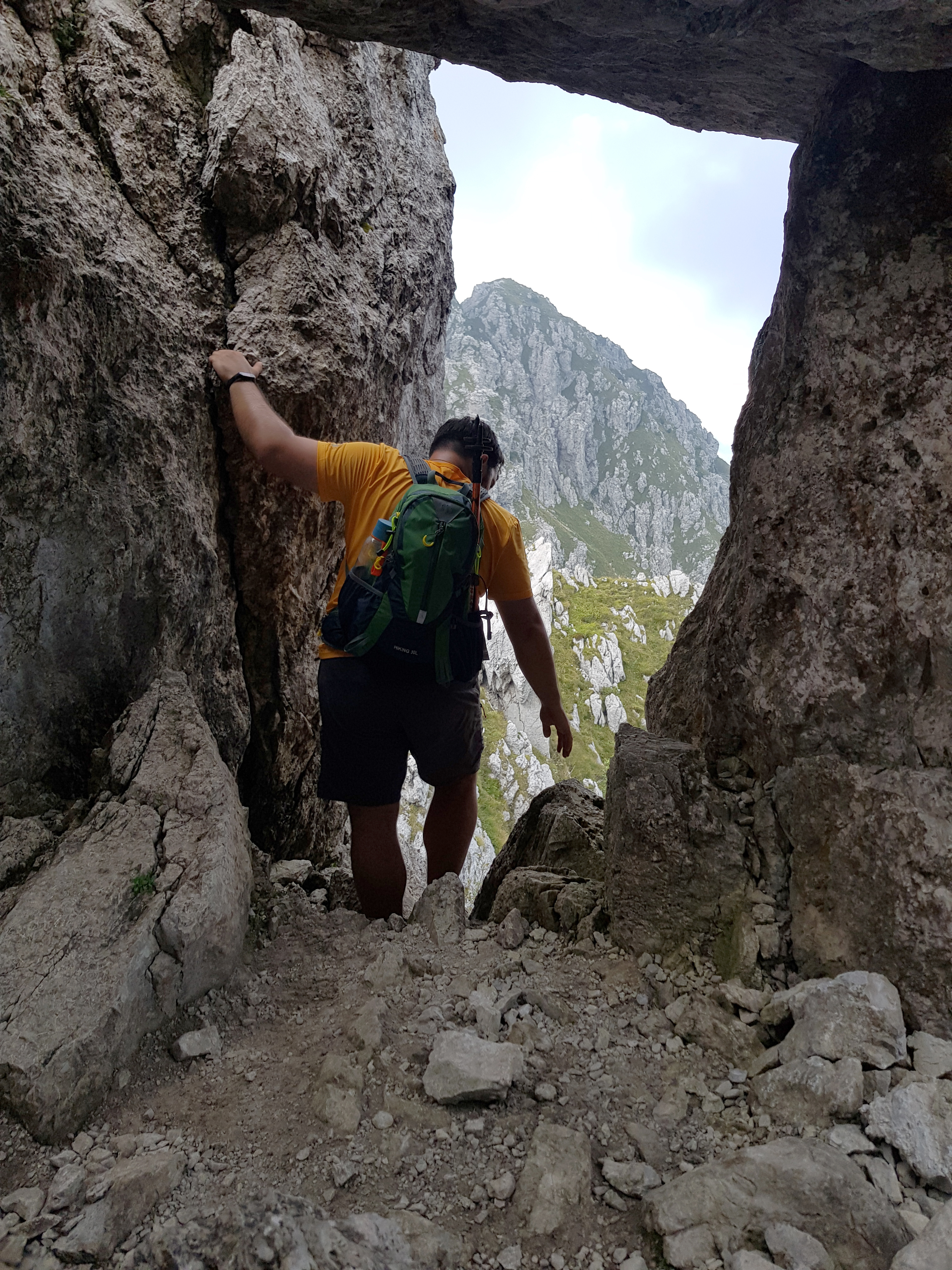
Hiker in the rock tunnel along trail 501 connecting Alben and Cima della Croce

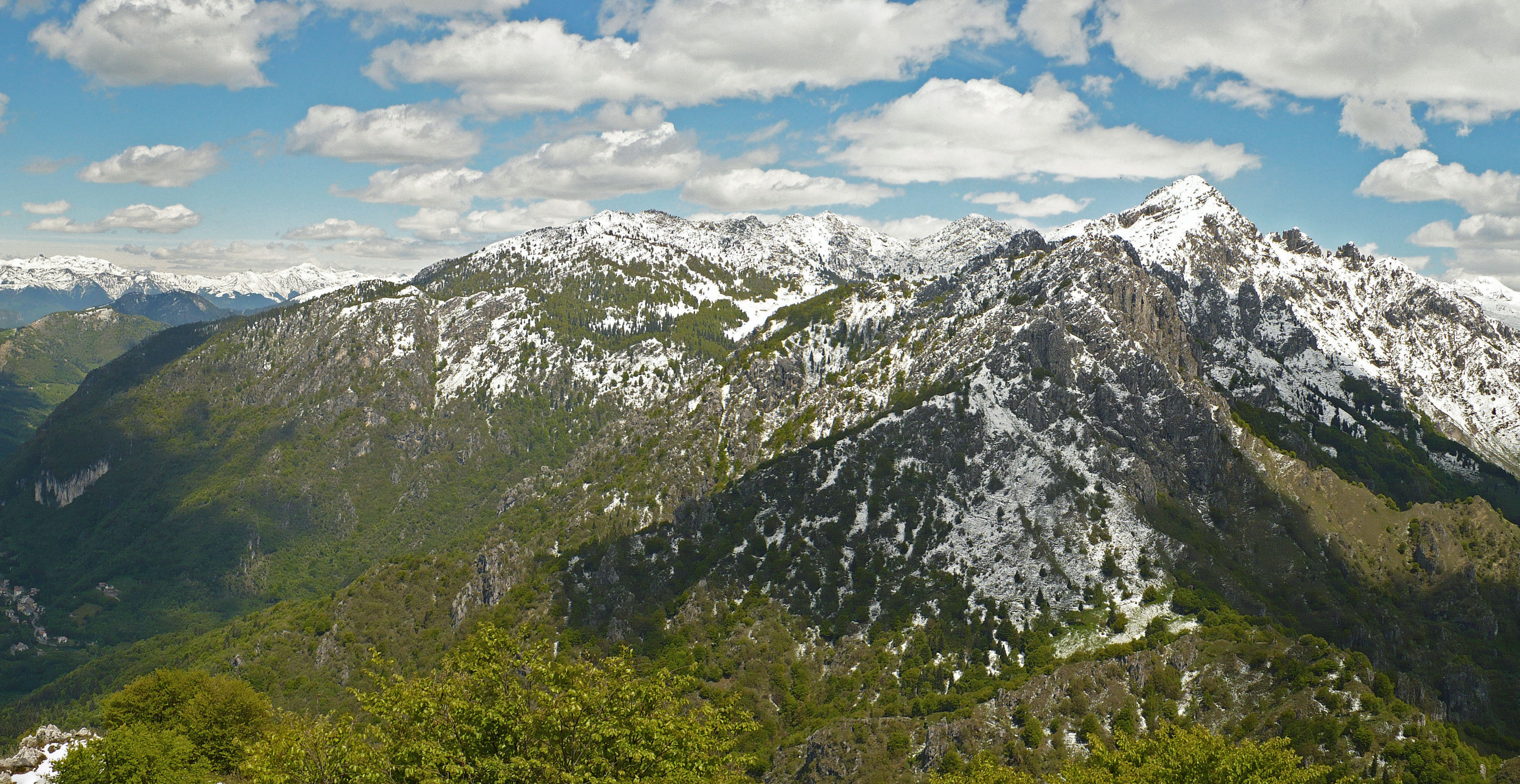
The southern slope of Alben as seen from Mount Suchello

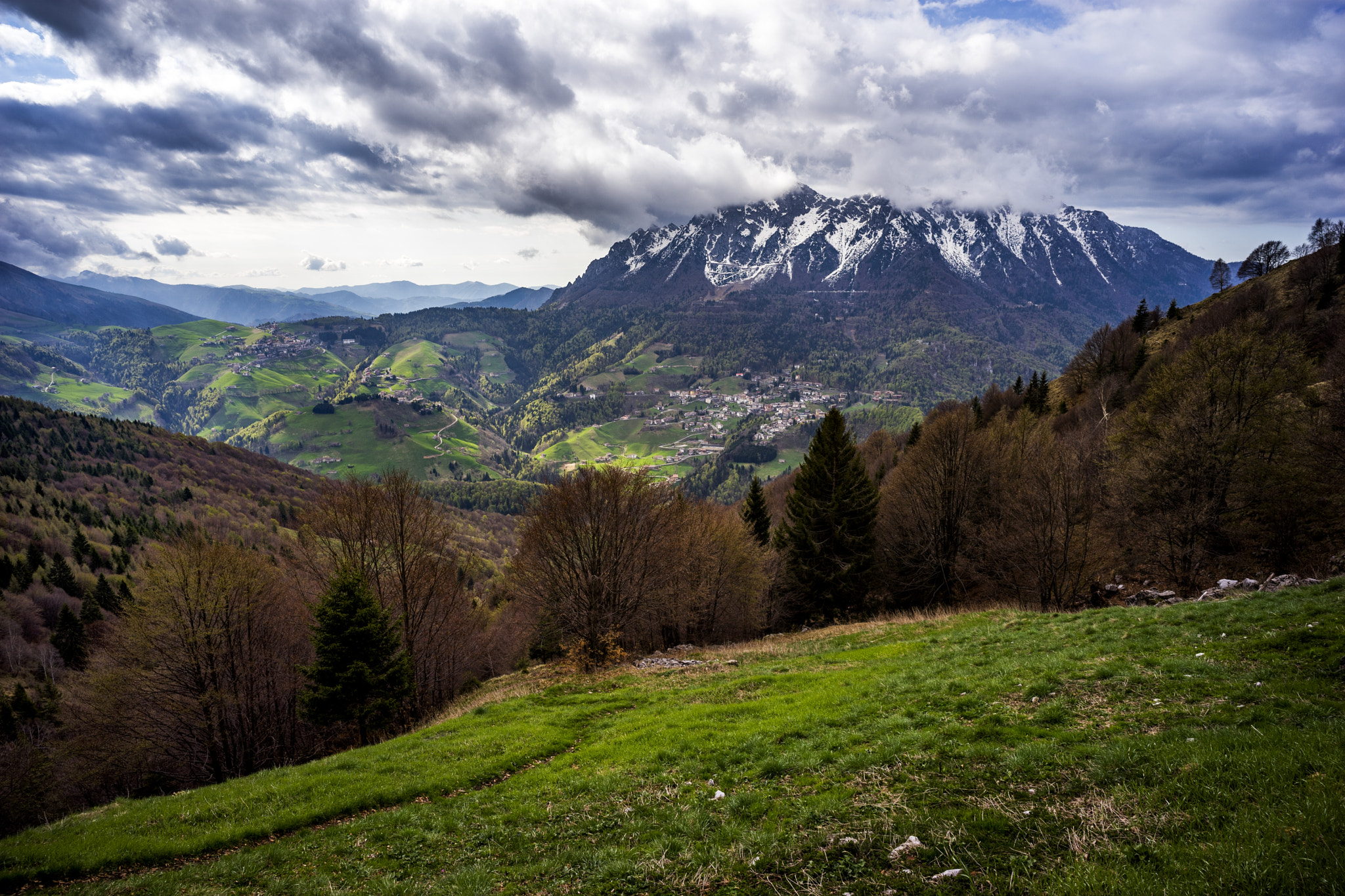
The northern slope

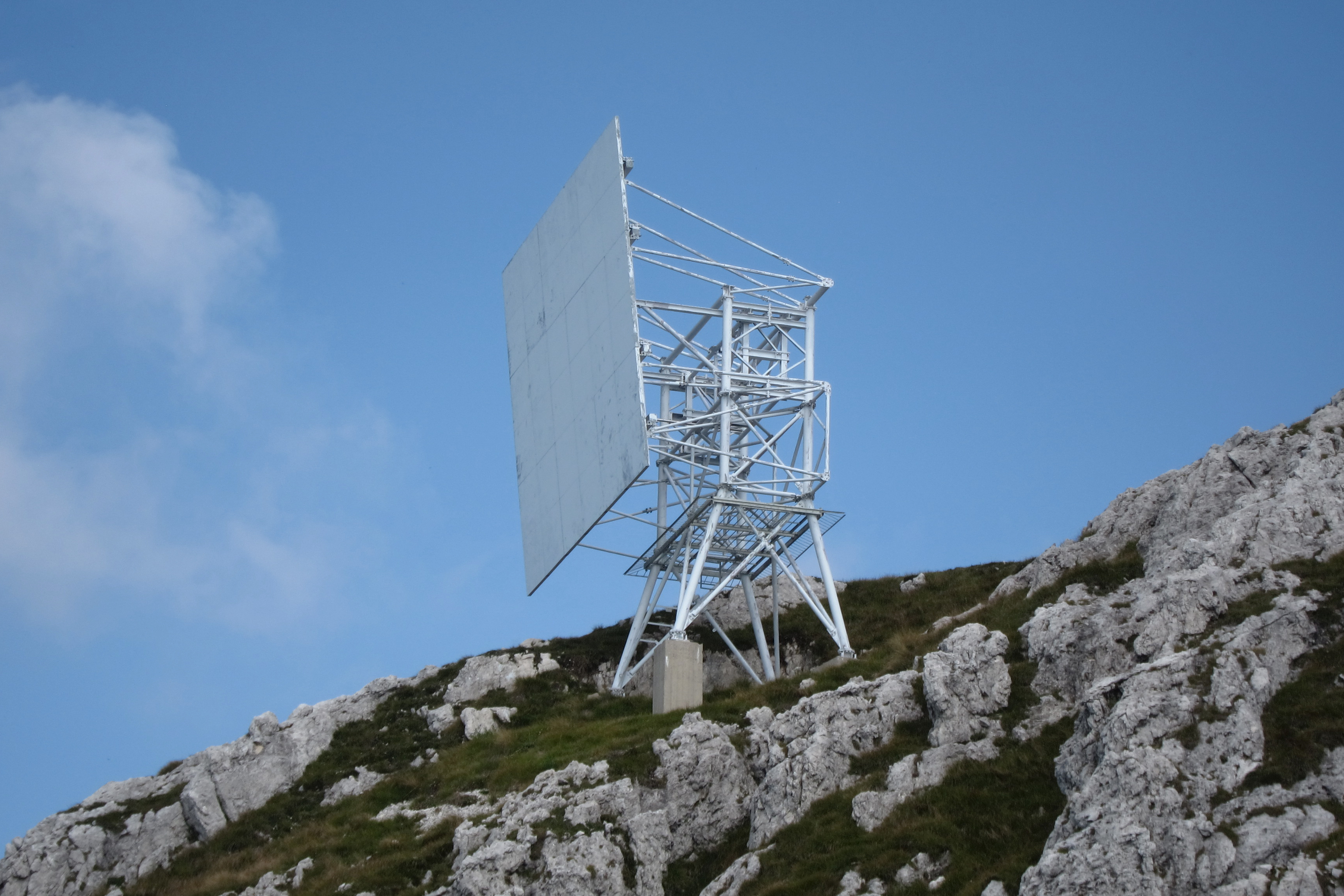
Repeater located just below the summit of Mt. Alben

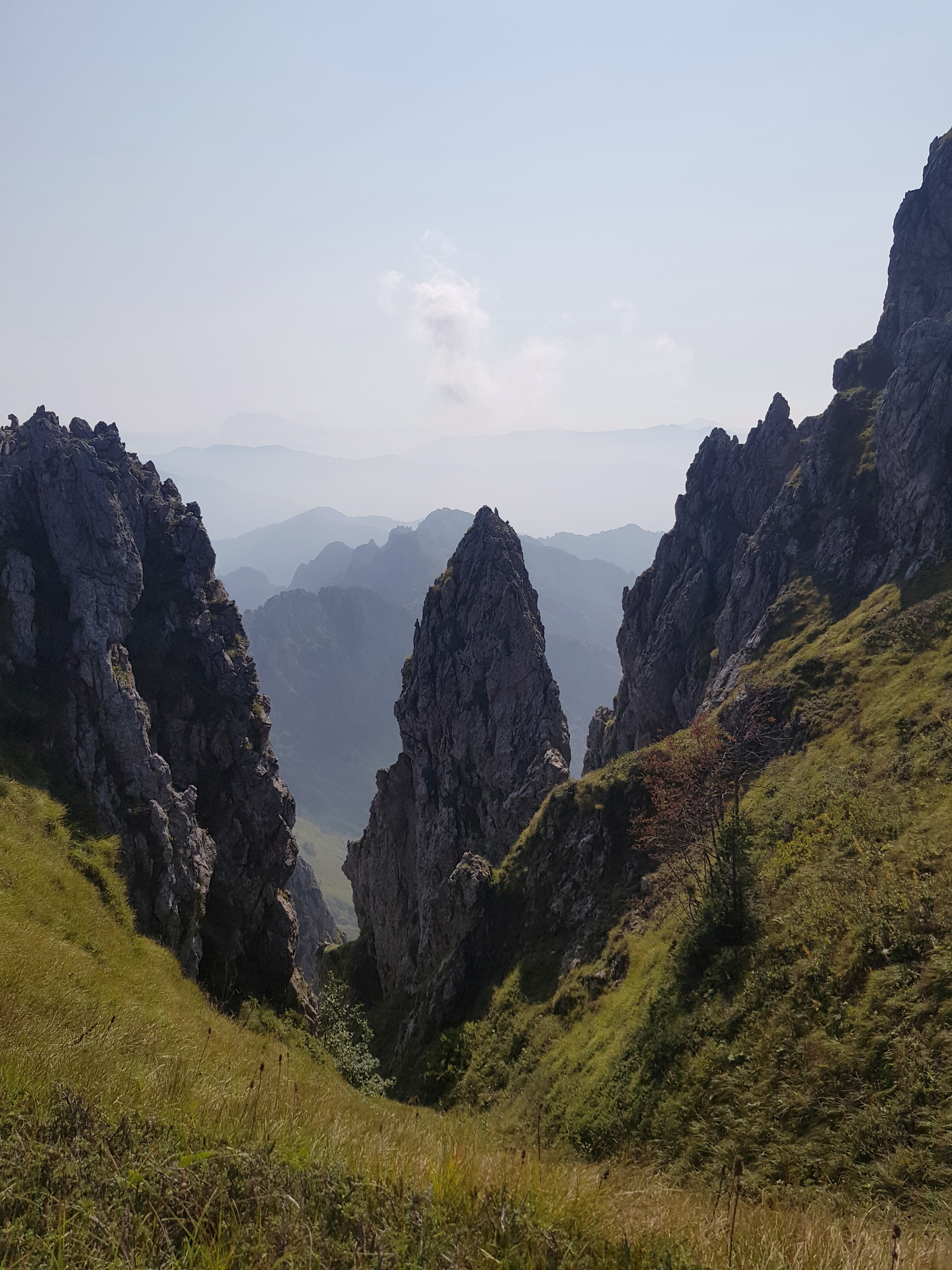
The rocky spires along the ridge trail

== See also ==
- Bergamasque Prealps
- Province of Bergamo
- Val Brembana
