= Cima di Menna =

Mountain in Lombardy, Italy

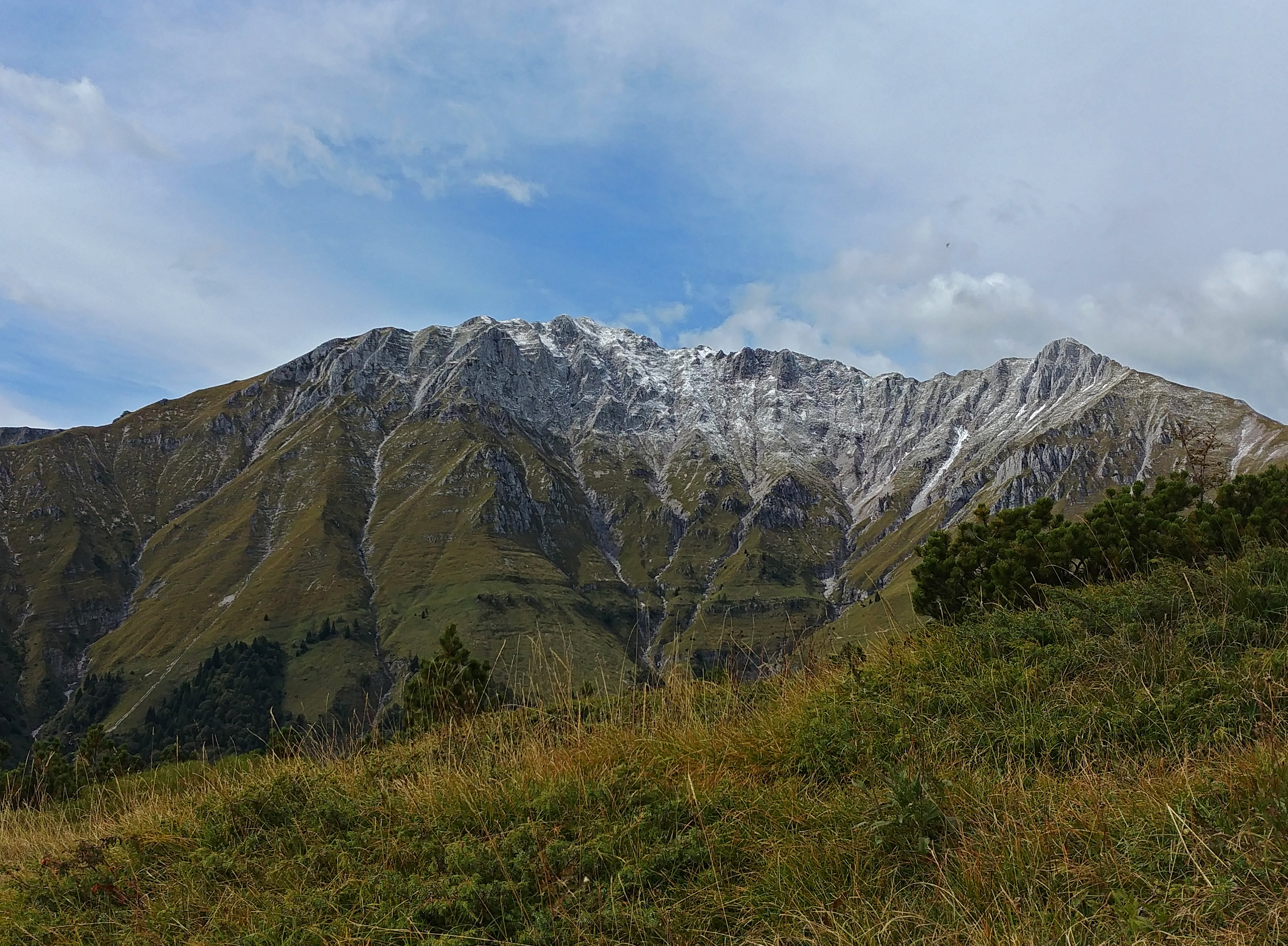

Highest point
- Elevation: 2,300 m (7,500 ft)
- Prominence: 453 m (1,486 ft)
- Coordinates: 45°55′46″N 9°45′35″E

Geography
- Location: Lombardy, Italy
- Parent range: Bergamasque Prealps

Cima di Menna is a mountain of Lombardy, Italy, with an elevation of 2,300 metres (7,546 ft). It is located in the Bergamasque Prealps, in the Province of Bergamo.

The mountain overlooks the Val Brembana and can be reached with hiking paths starting from Costa, a hamlet of Roncobello, or Zorzone, a hamlet of Oltre il Colle. It is one of the four peaks reached by the yearly MAGA (Menna-Arera-Grem-Alben) sky race.

An unmanned mountain hut, Rifugio Palazzi/Bivacco MAGA, lies 300 meters below the summit.
