= Alpi e Prealpi Bergamasche =

Mountain range in the southern part of the Alps

Bergamasque Alps and Prealps
- Alpi e Prealpi Bergamasche
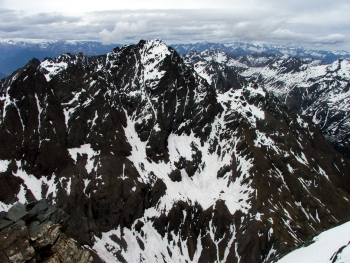
- Pizzo Coca - view from Pizzo Redorta

Highest point
- Peak: Pizzo Coca
- Elevation: 3,050 m (10,010 ft)
- Listing: Mountain ranges of Italy
- Coordinates: 46°47′10″N 10°00′42″E

Geography
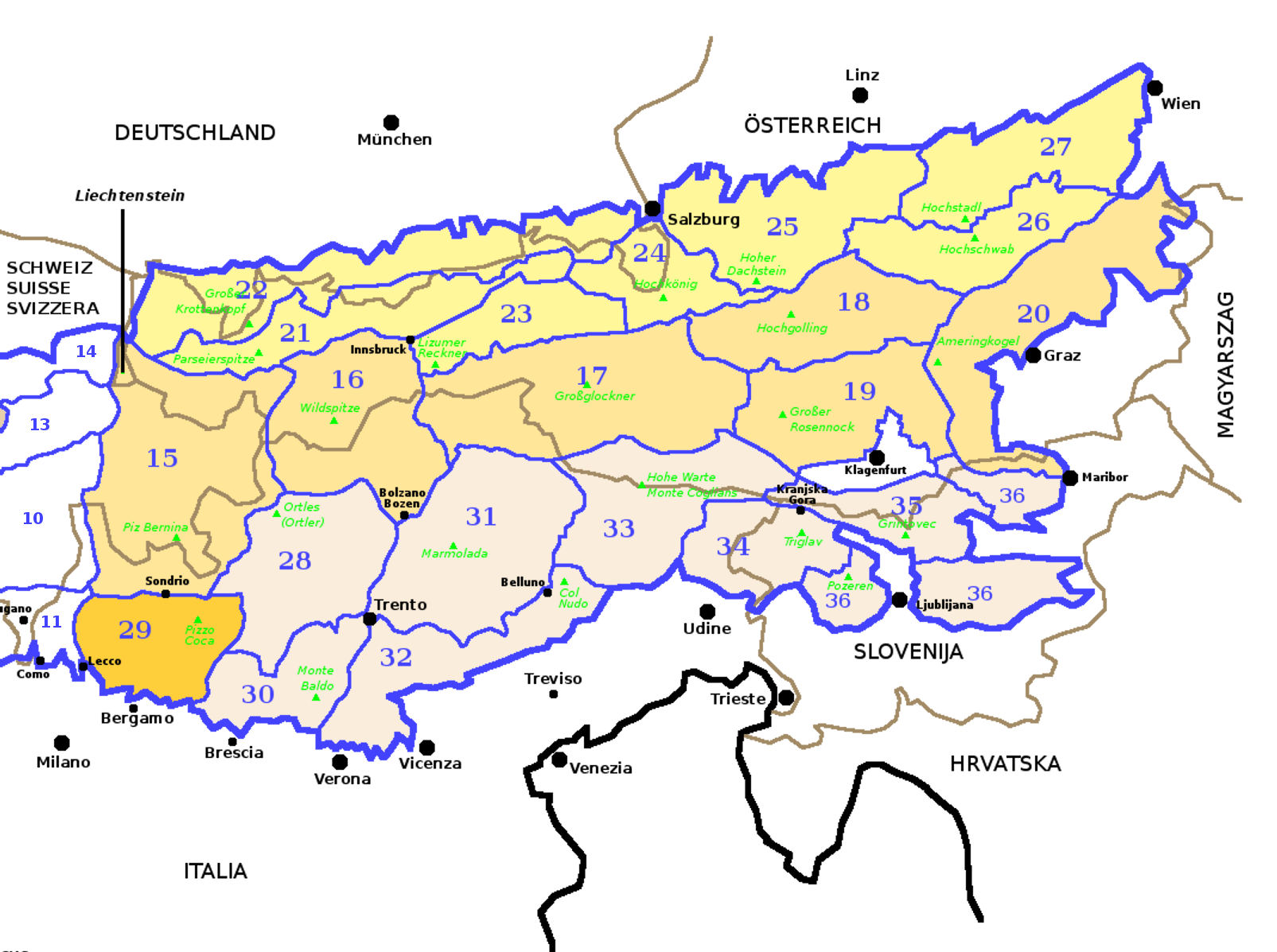
- Bergamasque Alps and Prealps (section nr.29) within Eastern Alps
- Country: Italy
- Region: Lombardy
- Provinces: Bergamo, Sondrio, Lecco, Brescia
- Parent range: Alps
- Borders on: Western Rhaetian Alps, Southern Rhaetian Alps, Brescia and Garda Prealps, Lugano Prealps and Po plain

Geology
- Orogeny: Alpine orogeny
- Rock type(s): Sedimentary rocks, especially in the southernmost area

The Bergamasque Alps and Prealps (Alpi e Prealpi Bergamasche in Italian) are a mountain range in the southern part of the Alps. They are located in Lombardy, in the northern part of Italy.

== Geography ==
Administratively the range belongs to the Italian province of Bergamo and, marginally, to the provinces of Sondrio, Lecco and Brescia.

The western slopes of the mountains are drained by the Adda, the central and western part of the range by Oglio and other minor rivers and streams, all of them tributaries of the Po .

=== SOIUSA classification ===
According to SOIUSA (International Standardized Mountain Subdivision of the Alps) the mountain range is an Alpine section, classified in the following way:

- main part = Eastern Alps
- major sector = Southern Limestone Alps
- section = Bergamasque Alps and Prealps
- code = II/C-29

=== Borders ===
Bergamasque Alps and Prealps' borders are (clockwise):

- Como lake (west);
- river Adda, Aprica pass and Corteno valley (north);
- val Camonica and Iseo lake (east);
- Po Plain (south).

=== Subdivision ===
The Bergamasque Alps and Prealps are subdivided in two subsections:

- Bergamo Alps (IT: Alpi Orobie) - SOIUSA code: II/C-29.I,
- Bergamasque Prealps (IT: Prealpi Bergamasche)- SOIUSA code: II/C-29.II,

which are divided by some secondary valleys of Val Brembana, Val Seriana and Val Camonica: Valsassina, Valtorta, Val Secca, Valcanale, Val Nembo, Val di Scalve and Val Paisco.

== Notable summits ==
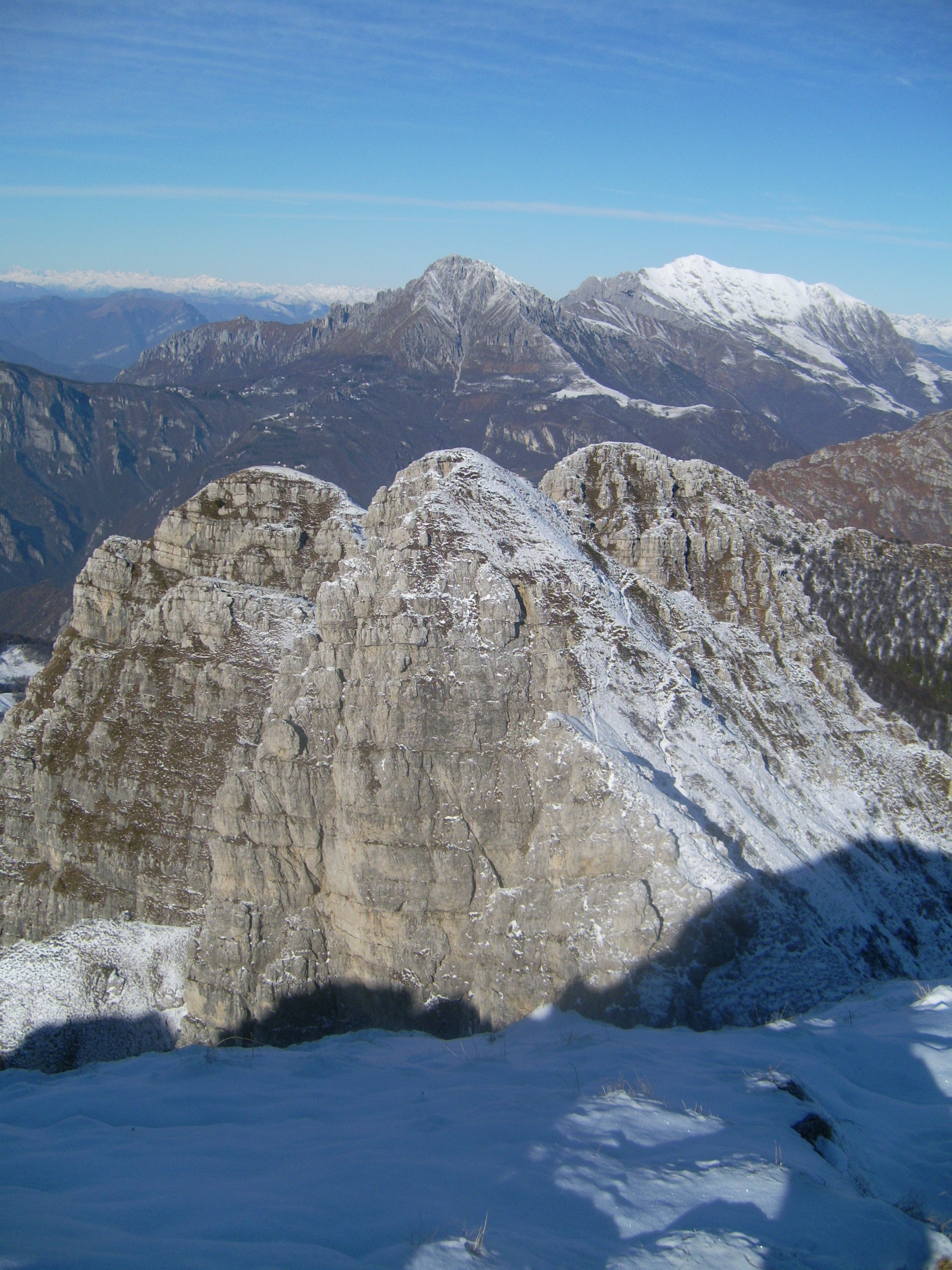
Monte Resegone, in the Bergamasque Prealps

Some notable summits of the range are:

Name	metres	feet
Pizzo Coca	3,050	10,007
Corno Stella	2,620	8,596
Pizzo Recastello	2,886	9,475
Monte Legnone	2,609	8,563
Pizzo Tre Signori	2,554	8,379
Pizzo Arera	2,512	8,241
Presolana	2,511	8,239
Pizzo Camino	2,492	8,224
Grigna	2,410	7,907
Monte Resegone	1,875	6,155
Canto Alto	1,146	3,760

== Maps ==
- Italian official cartography (Istituto Geografico Militare - IGM); on-line version: www.pcn.minambiente.it
