= Valletto =

Valletto may refer to:

- Monte Valletto, a mountain in Italy
- Valletto, a character in Monteverdi's opera L'incoronazione di Poppea
