= Monte Valletto =

Mountain in Lombardy, Italy

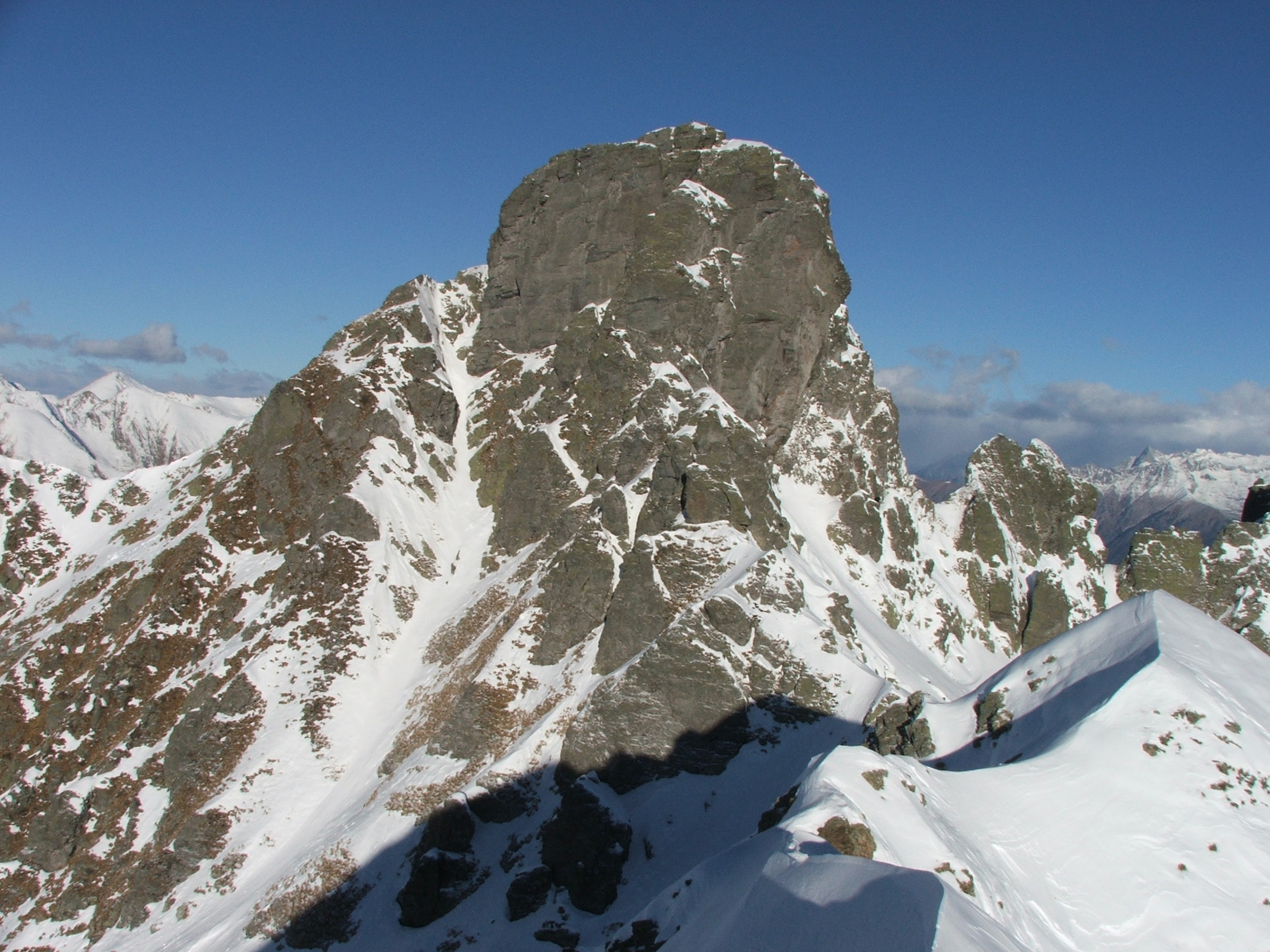
- Monte Valletto from the ridge linking it to Monte Triomen

Highest point
- Elevation: 2,371 m (7,779 ft)
- Prominence: 89 m (292 ft)
- Parent peak: Monte Ponteranica
- Coordinates: 46°01′27″N 9°35′16″E

Geography
- Location within Lombardy
- Location: Bergamo / Sondrio, Lombardy, Italy
- Parent range: Orobie Alps

Climbing
- Easiest route: Hike from Gerola Alta

Monte Valletto is a mountain, 2,371 metres (7,779 ft) high, in the Orobie Alps of Lombardy, northern Italy. It rises on the watershed between the upper Val Brembana, in the Province of Bergamo, and the Val Gerola, a side valley of the Valtellina in the Province of Sondrio.

== Geography ==
In the SOIUSA classification of the Alps the mountain belongs to the Orobie Alps, within the Ponteranica group (code II/C-29.I-B.5). With Monte Ponteranica and Monte Triomen it encloses the basin of the Ponteranica lakes.

== Ascent ==
Monte Valletto is usually climbed from Gerola Alta, in the Val Gerola. From the Pescegallo car park a waymarked path climbs past the Rifugio Salmurano to join Italian Alpine Club path 101, part of the Sentiero delle Orobie, and reaches the saddle below the summit; the final stretch involves some easy scrambling.
