= Formai de Mut dell'Alta Valle Brembana =

Italian cheese

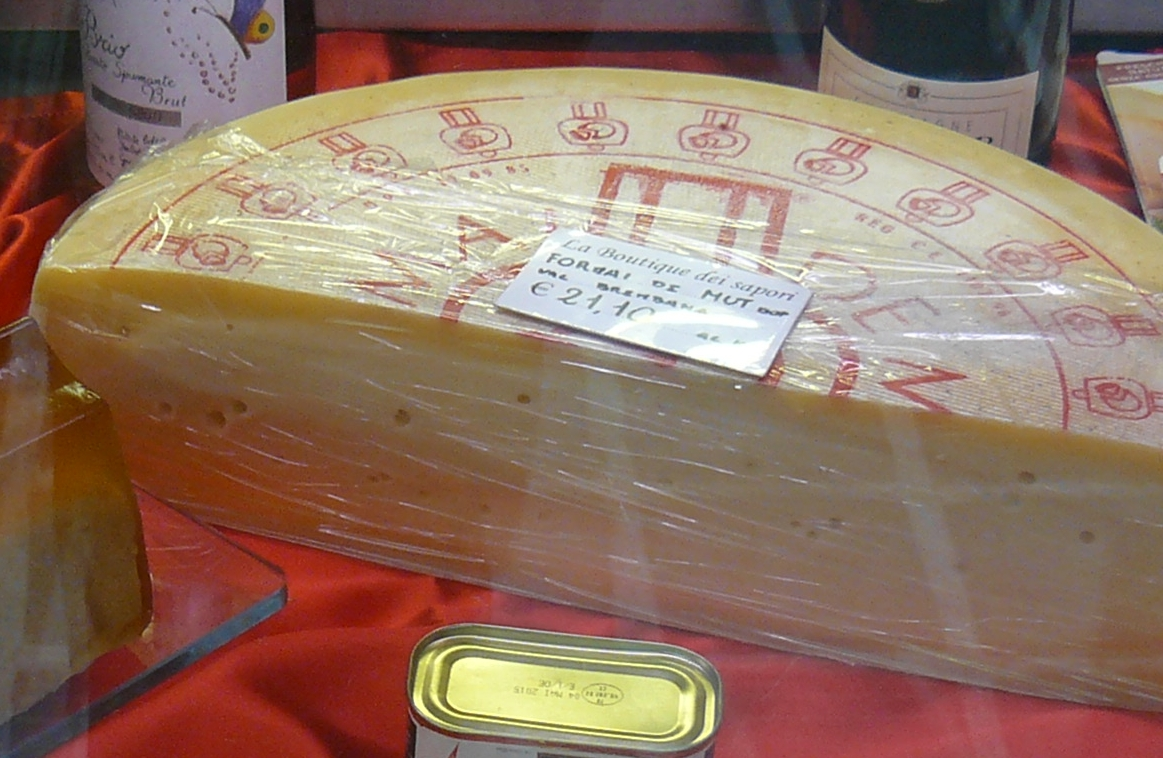
- Country of origin: Italy
- Region: Lombardy
- Town: Val Brembana
- Source of milk: Raw cow's milk
- Pasteurized: No
- Certification: Protected designation of origin, 1996

Formai de Mut dell'Alta Valle Brembana is an Italian cheese prepared from raw cow's milk that originated in Lombardy, Italy. It is prepared in a similar manner to Fontina d'Aosta cheese at Alta Valle Brembana in high pasture lands and in Bergamo, Lombardy. It is rarely found outside of Lombardy, and it is produced in "very limited quantities". It was classified with a protected designation of origin status in 1996.

== Characteristics ==
Formai de Mut dell'Alta Valle Brembana is prepared using raw cow's milk, and has been described as delicate and simple with "a light floral taste in the manner of Branzi".

Young versions of Formai de Mut dell'Alta Valle Brembana have a pale, thin rind, while those that are aged longer and rubbed with additional brine have a harder and darker rind. Aged versions develop more fragrancy and fruitiness in flavor compared to young versions.

== Use in dishes ==
People in local communities use Formai de Mut dell'Alta Valle Brembana as a topping for soups and stews, in fonduta and in gratin dishes.

== See also ==
- List of Italian cheeses
