= Galium montis-arerae =

Pizzo Arera bedstraw

Scientific classification
- Kingdom: Plantae
- Clade: Tracheophytes
- Clade: Angiosperms
- Clade: Eudicots
- Clade: Asterids
- Order: Gentianales
- Family: Rubiaceae
- Genus: Galium
- Species: G. montis-arerae

Binomial name
- Galium montis-arerae Merxm. & Ehrend.

Species of plant

Galium montis-arerae, the Pizzo Arera bedstraw, is a rare plant species in the Rubiaceae. It is named after the mountain called Pizzo Arera, in the Bergamo Alps of Lombardia region in northern Italy. It is found only in the range from Monte Pegherolo to Concarena in Bergamasque Prealps.

Galium montis-arerae is an ascending, caespitose herb. Stems are square in cross-section, up to 40 cm long. Leaves are in whorls of 6-8 narrowly oblanceolate leaves, thick and somewhat succulent. Inflorescence is an elongated panicle of yellow flowers.
