= Pizzo Recastello =

Mountain of Lombardy, Italy

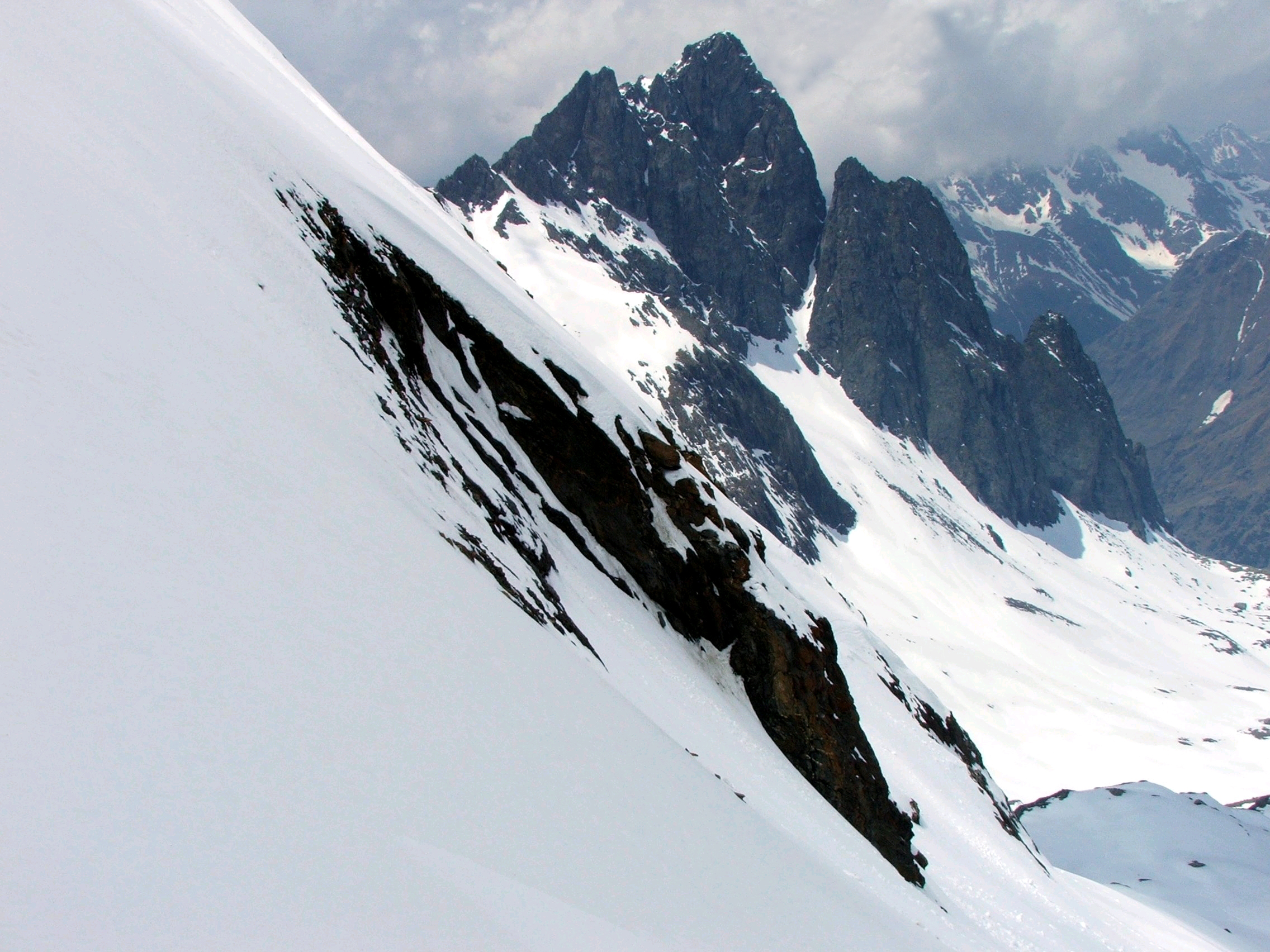

Highest point
- Elevation: 2,886 m (9,469 ft)
- Coordinates: 46°03′25″N 10°04′33″E

Geography
- Location within Alps
- Location: Lombardy, Italy
- Parent range: Bergamasque Alps and Prealps

Pizzo Recastello is a mountain of Lombardy, Italy. It is located within the Bergamo Alps.

== SOIUSA classification ==
According to the SOIUSA (International Standardized Mountain Subdivision of the Alps) the mountain can be classified in the following way:

- main part = Eastern Alps
- major sector = Southern Limestone Alps
- section = Bergamasque Alps and Prealps
- subsection = Bergamo Alps
- supergroup = Alpi Orobie Orientali
- group = Gruppo di Coca
- subgroup = Gruppo del Barbellino
- code = II/C-29.I-A.2.a
