= Pizzo Camino =

Mountain in Italy

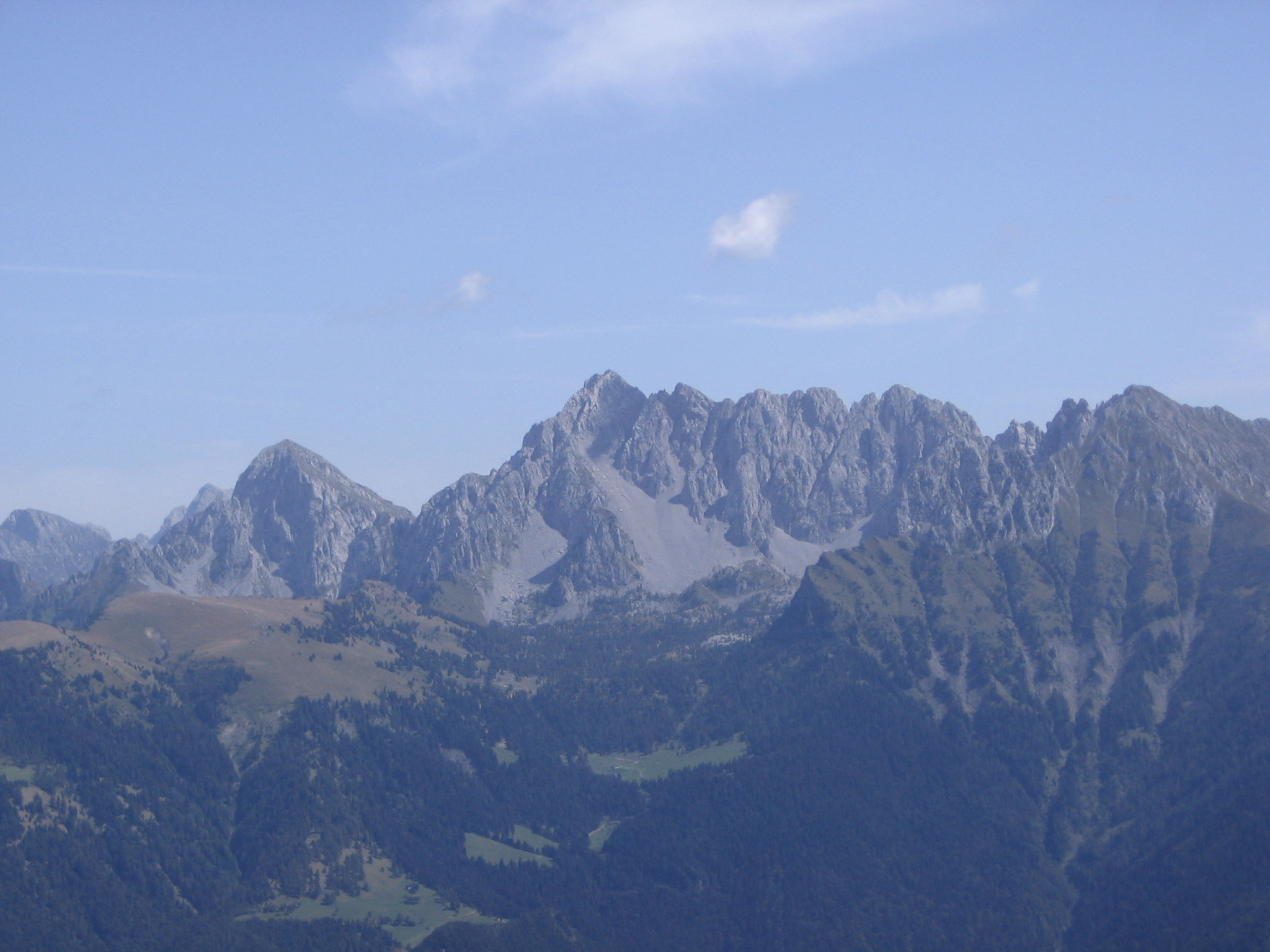

Highest point
- Elevation: 2,492 m (8,176 ft)
- Coordinates: 45°58′59″N 10°10′38″E

Geography
- Location within Alps
- Location: Lombardy, Italy
- Parent range: Bergamo Prealps

Pizzo Camino (Pis Camì) is a mountain in the Bergamo Prealps, with a height of 2,492 metres (8,176 ft).

It belongs to the massif dividing the upper Val di Scalve from the upper Val Camonica, together with the Concarena and the Cimone della Bagozza. It is on the boundaries between the provinces of Brescia and Bergamo.

The summit is composed from limestone rocks, formed in the middle Triassic period from the former Tethys Ocean. The lower sides have instead a more sandstone-marl composition.

== SOIUSA classification ==
According to the SOIUSA (International Standardized Mountain Subdivision of the Alps) the mountain can be classified in the following way:

- main part = Eastern Alps
- major sector = Southern Limestone Alps
- section = Bergamasque Alps and Prealps
- subsection = Bergamasque Prealps
- supergroup = Prealpi Bergamasche Orientali
- group = Gruppo Camino-Concarena
- subgroup = Gruppo del Pizzo Camino
- code = II/C-29.II-C.11.b
