= San Marco Pass =

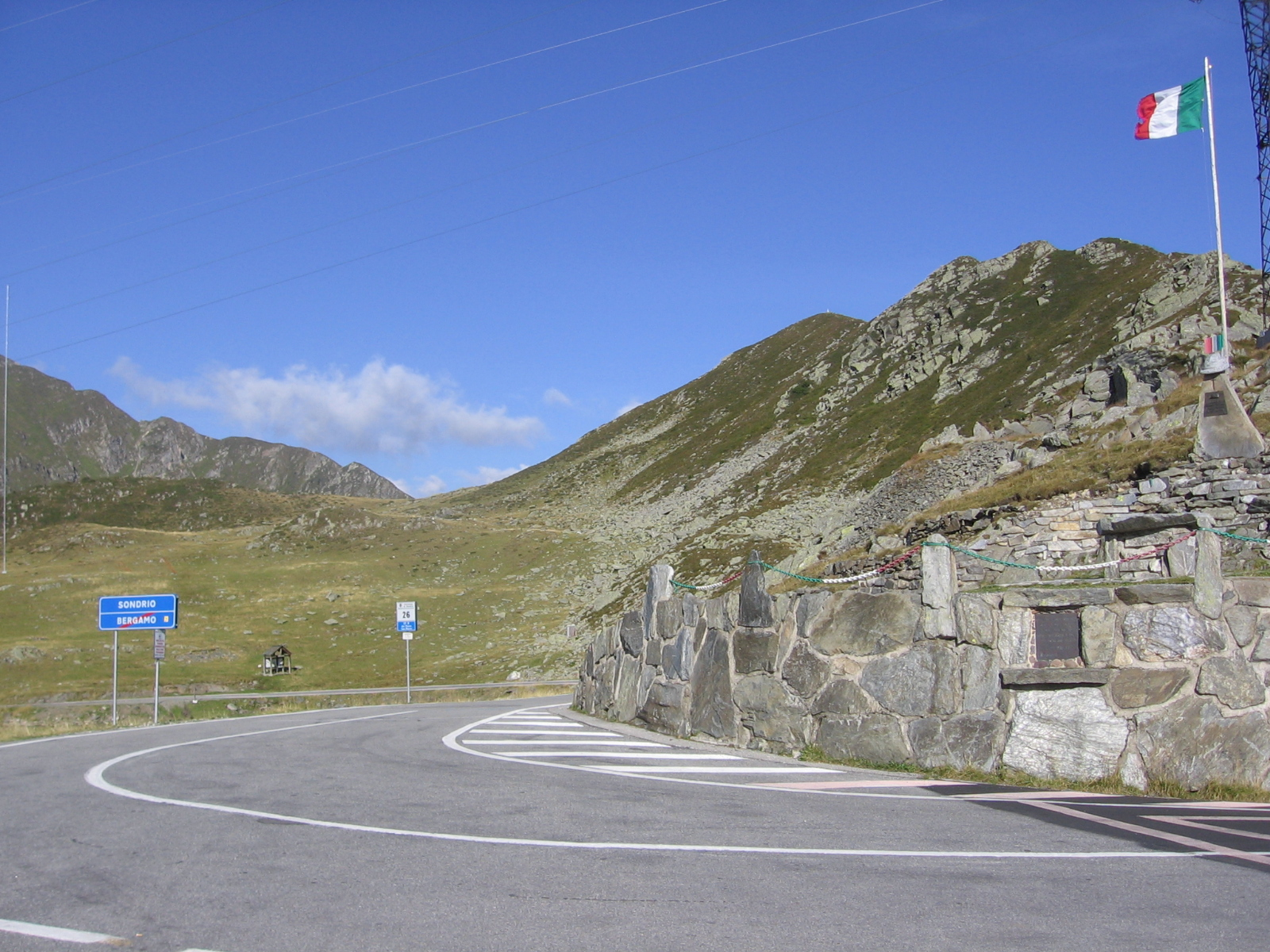

- Location within Alps
- Elevation: 1,992 metres (6,535 ft)

Third Approach
- Location: Italy
- Range: Alps
- Coordinates: 46°02′50″N 09°37′22″E

The San Marco Pass (Italian: Passo San Marco) is a mountain pass that links Val Brembana with Valtellina in the Bergamo Alps.

== History ==
In the late 16th century, the city of Bergamo and its surrounding areas were part of the Republic of Venice and Valtellina was part of the Grisons. In the late years of the century the Republic of Venice decided to build a new road, that without crossing the Duchy of Milan, can create a new road ties between the Grisons and the Republic. So the paved road of San Marco Pass was built. Close to the pass at 1830 m above the sea level there is Ca San Marco a house also built in the late 16th century to provide care to the travelers during winter time. In the years after the World War II a new road has been built. The Giro d'Italia climbs San Marco Pass during the 2007 edition.

== See also ==
- List of highest paved roads in Europe
- List of mountain passes
