= Monte Ponteranica =

Mountain in Italy

Coordinates: 46°01′47″N 9°35′41″E

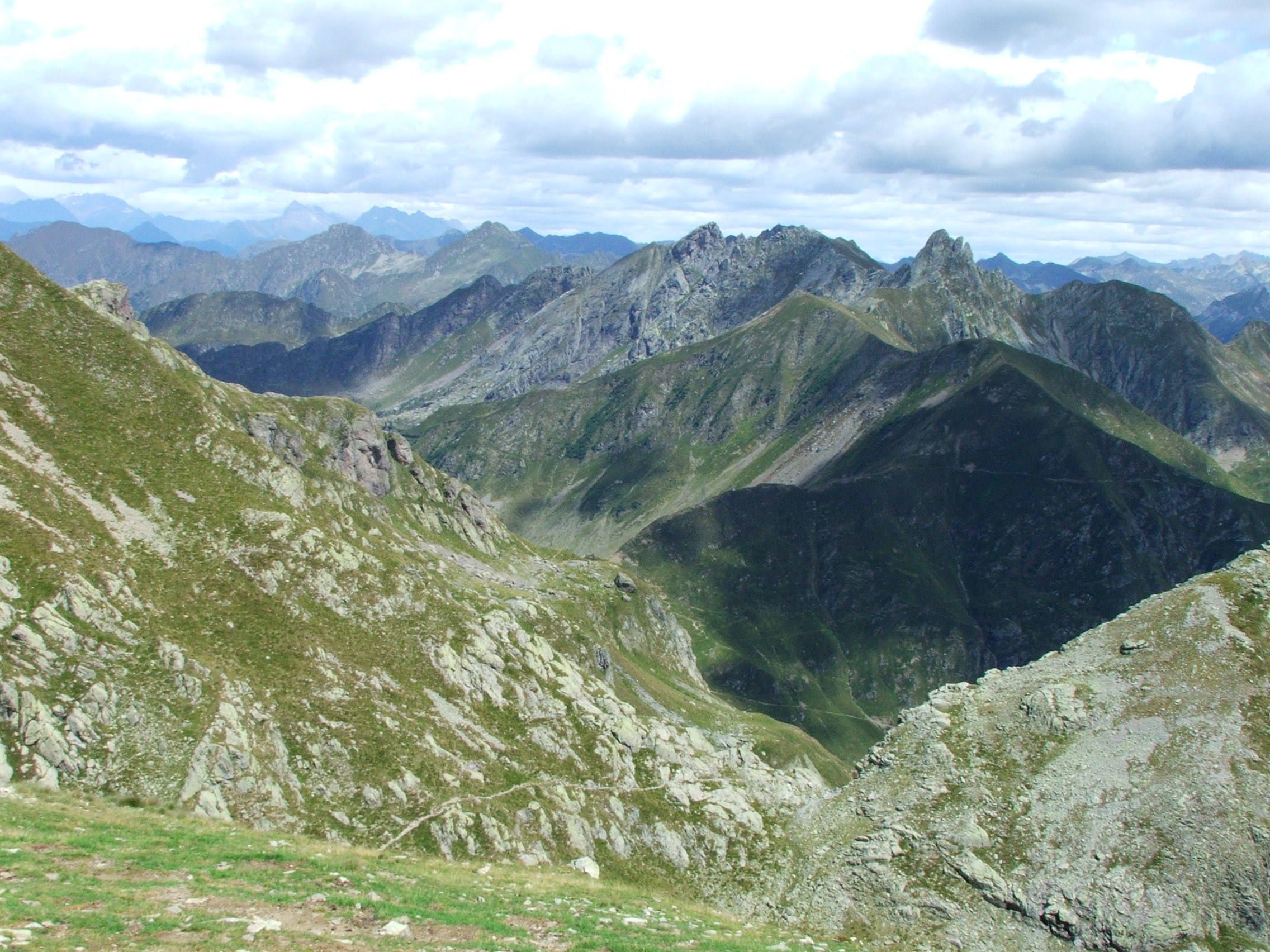

Highest point
- Elevation: 2,378 m (7,802 ft)

Geography
- Location: Lombardy, Italy
- Parent range: Bergamo Alps

Monte Ponteranica is a mountain of Lombardy, Italy. It is located within the Bergamo Alps. It has been a mountain hiking destination since the early 20th century.
