= Pizzo Arera =

Mountain in Italy

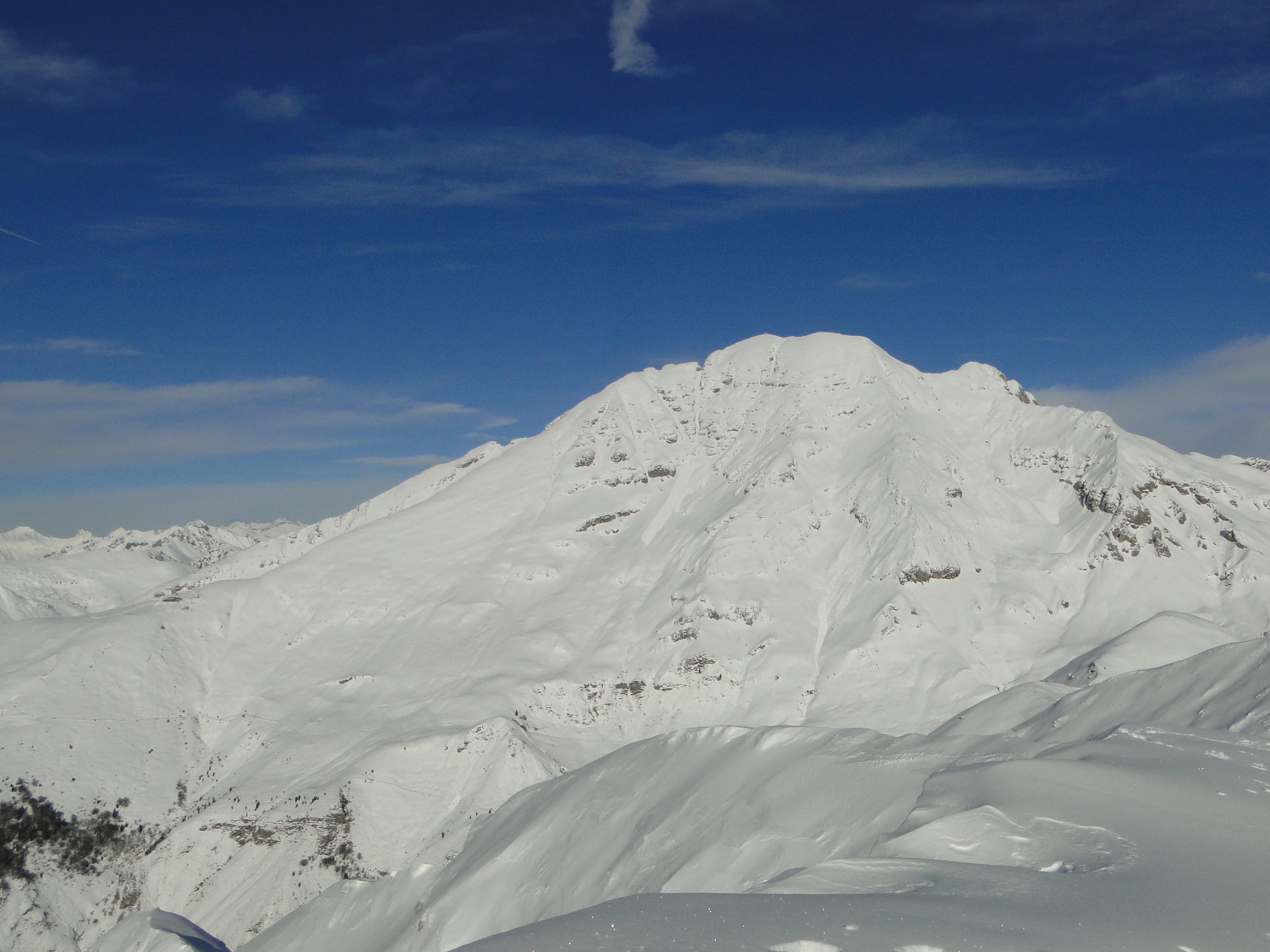
- Pizzo Arera in winter as seen from Mount Grem

Highest point
- Elevation: 2,512 m (8,241 ft)
- Prominence: 691 m (2,267 ft)
- Coordinates: 45°56′09″N 9°48′54″E

Geography
- Location within Alps
- Location: Bergamo, Italy
- Parent range: Bergamasque Prealps

Pizzo Arera is a mountain of the Bergamasque Prealps of northern Italy. Its peak is 2,512 metres (8,241 ft) above sea level.

== Geography ==
It is part of the ridge that divides Val Seriana from Val Brembana. The town of Roncobello is nearby. Fossils can be found on some ridges. It is the largest in a group of four mountains that surround Zambla Alta. The residents of the area around the mountain are often bilingual, speaking Italian and Bergamasque.

=== SOIUSA classification ===
According to the SOIUSA (International Standardized Mountain Subdivision of the Alps) the mountain can be classified in the following way:

- main part = Eastern Alps
- major sector = Southern Limestone Alps
- section = Bergamasque Alps and Prealps
- subsection = Bergamasque Prealps
- supergroup = Prealpi Bergamasche Centrali
- group = Gruppo Arera-Menna
- subgroup = Gruppo dell'Arera
- code = II/C-29.II-B.5.a

== Geology ==
Arera is composed mainly of Mesozoic sedimentary rocks, most of them limestones.

== Flora ==
Alpine regions have a high rate of endemism and a high diversity of plant species. This taxonomic diversity can be attributed to geographical isolation, glaciation, microhabitat differentiation.

Galium montis-arerae, the Pizzo Arera bedstraw, is a rare plant species in the Rubiaceae. It is named after the mountain, locus classicus where it was first described.
