= Presolana =

Mountain in Lombardy, northern Italy

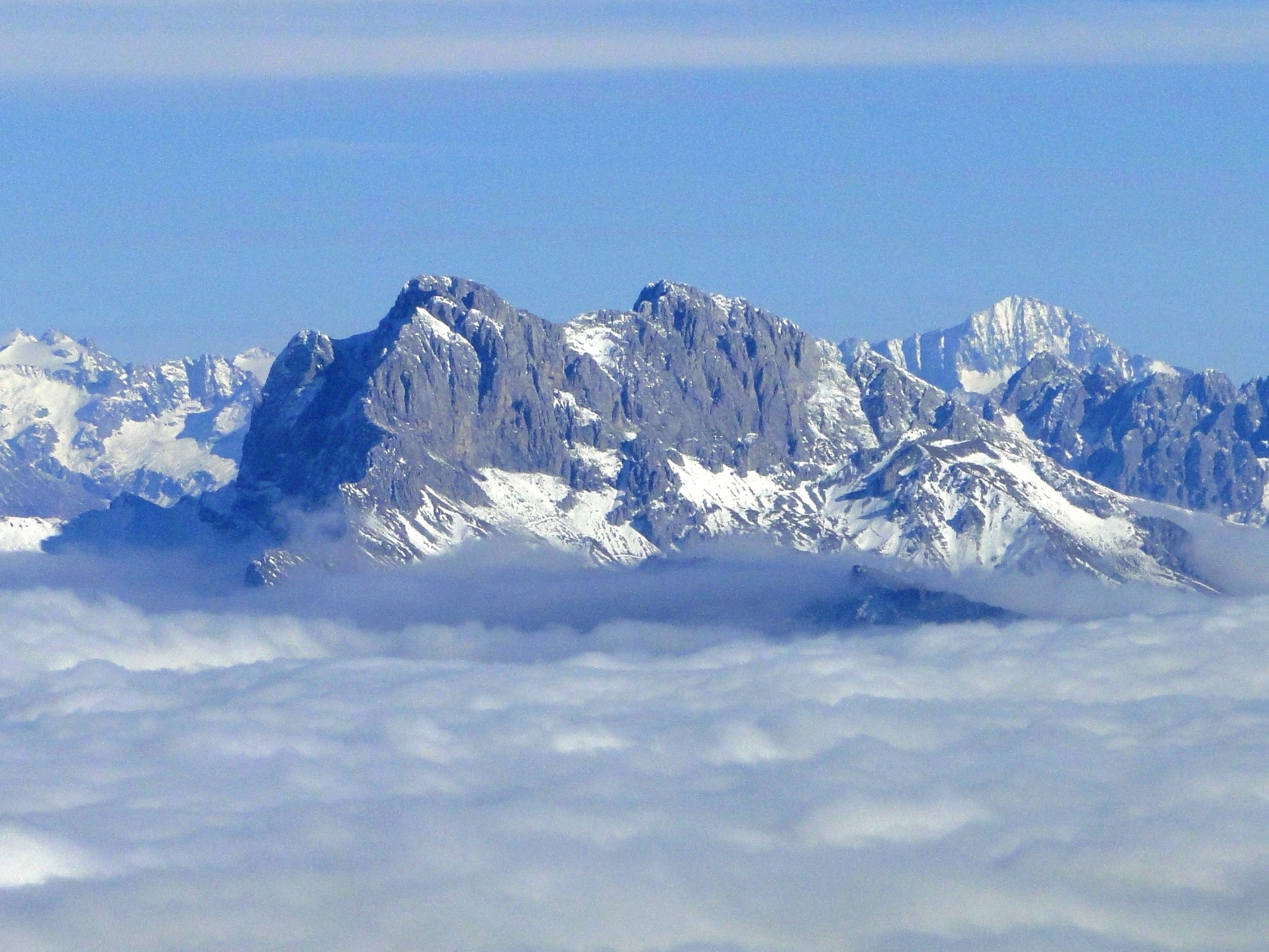
- Presolana in winter as seen from Mount Alben, emerging above low-lying stratus clouds.

Highest point
- Elevation: 2,521 m (8,271 ft)
- Prominence: 725
- Coordinates: 45°57′22″N 10°03′21″E

Geography
- Location within Alps
- Location: Lombardy, Italy
- Parent range: Bergamasque Prealps

Climbing
- First ascent: 3 October 1870, by Carlo Medici, Federico Frizzoni and Antonio Curò

Presolana (Italian: Pizzo della Presolana) is a mountain located in Lombardy, northern Italy, about 35 km north of Bergamo.

== Geography ==
Part of the Bergamasque Alps, it is included in the province of Bergamo, and divides the Val Seriana and Valle di Scalve.

The top of the mountain is called Presolana Occidentale (Western Presolana) and has a maximum altitude of 2,521 m above sea level.

=== SOIUSA classification ===
According to the SOIUSA (International Standardized Mountain Subdivision of the Alps) the mountain can be classified in the following way:

- main part = Eastern Alps
- major sector = Southern Limestone Alps
- section = Bergamasque Alps and Prealps
- subsection = Bergamasque Prealps
- supergroup = Prealpi Bergamasche Orientali
- group = Gruppo della Presolana
- subgroup = Costiera Presolana-Visolo-Bares
- code = II/C-29.II-C.7.b

== Geology ==
Presolana is notable as it is one of the few mountain in Lombardy composed of a limestone rock similar to dolomite.

== Gallery ==
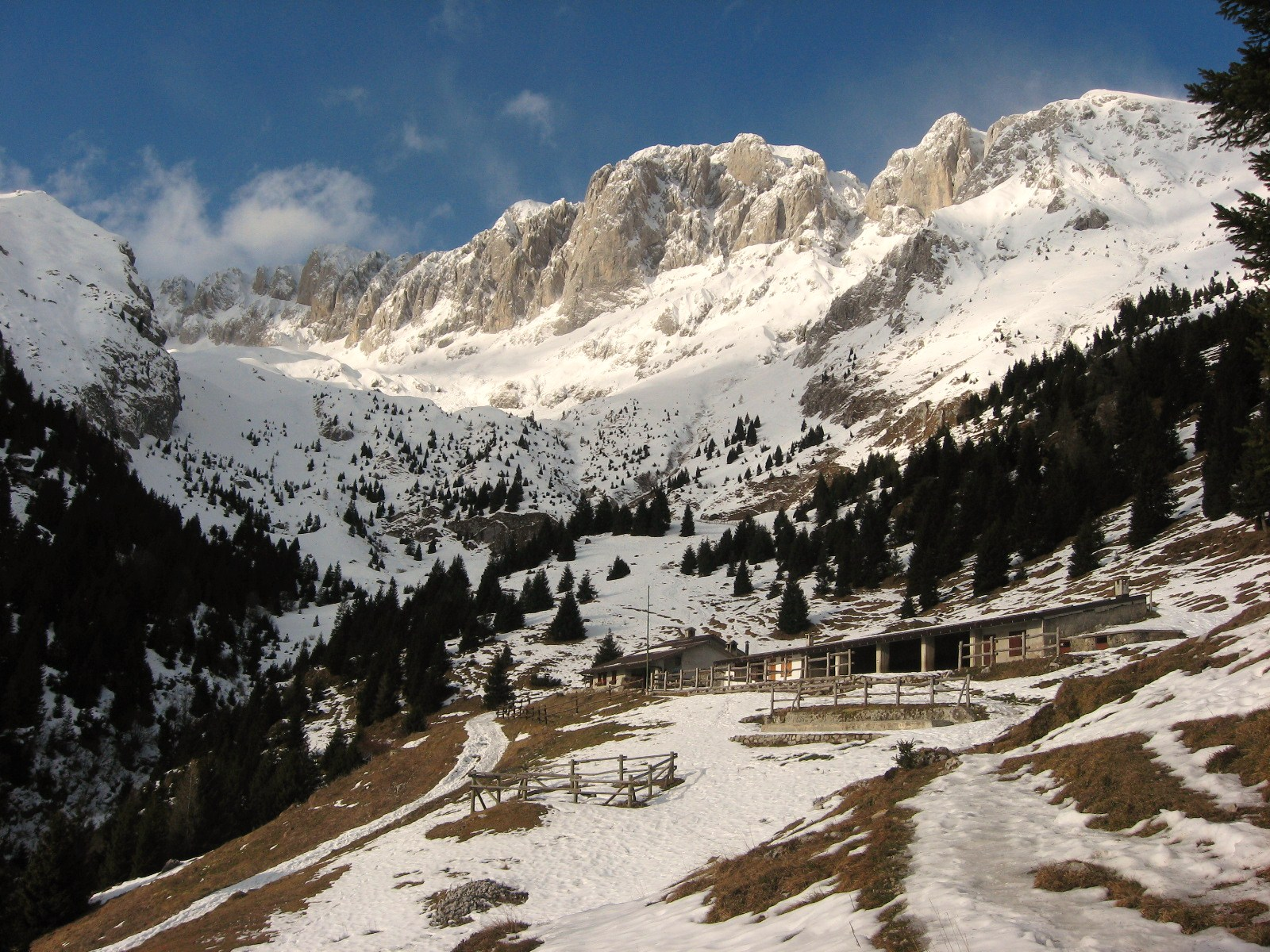

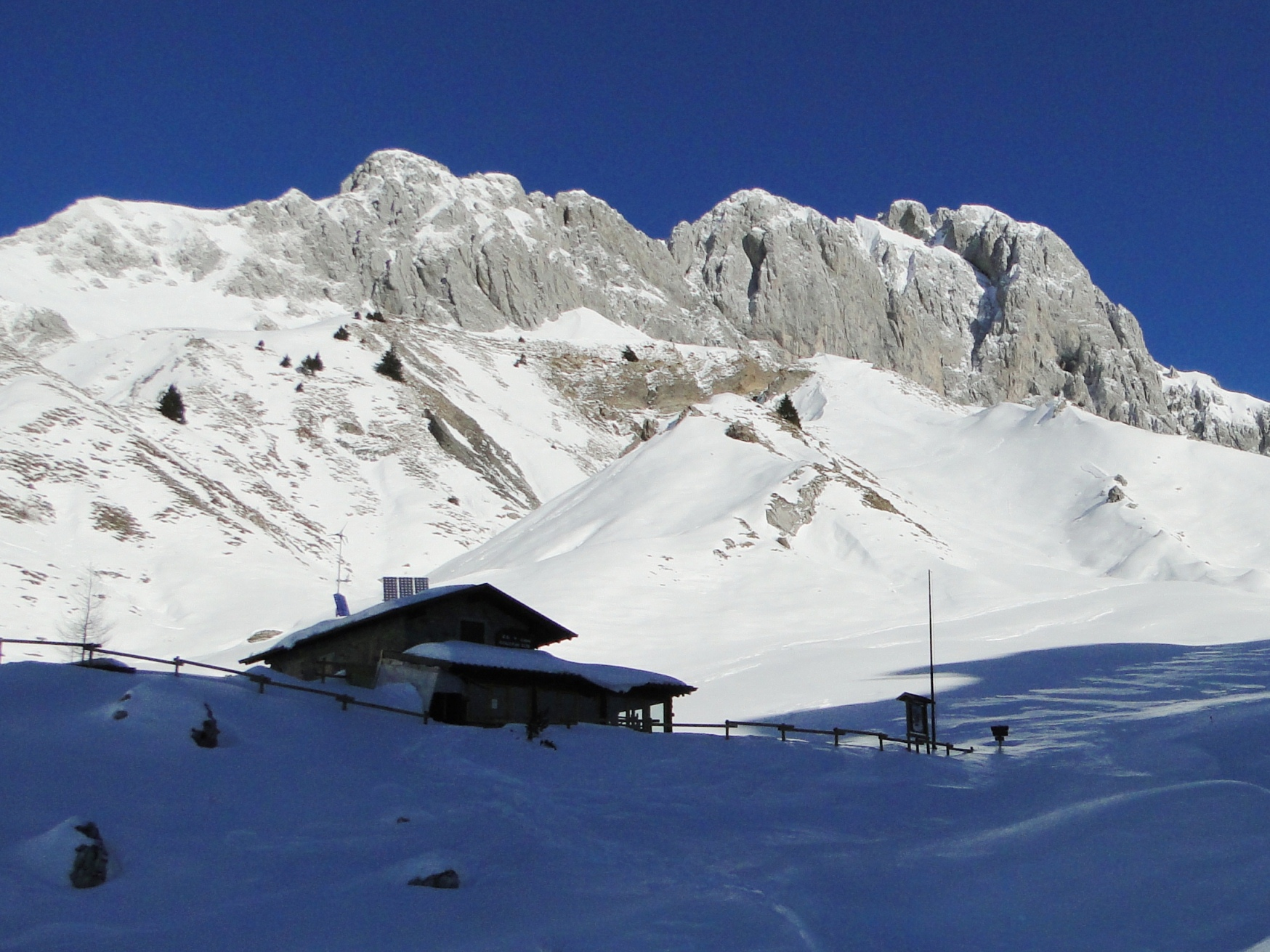

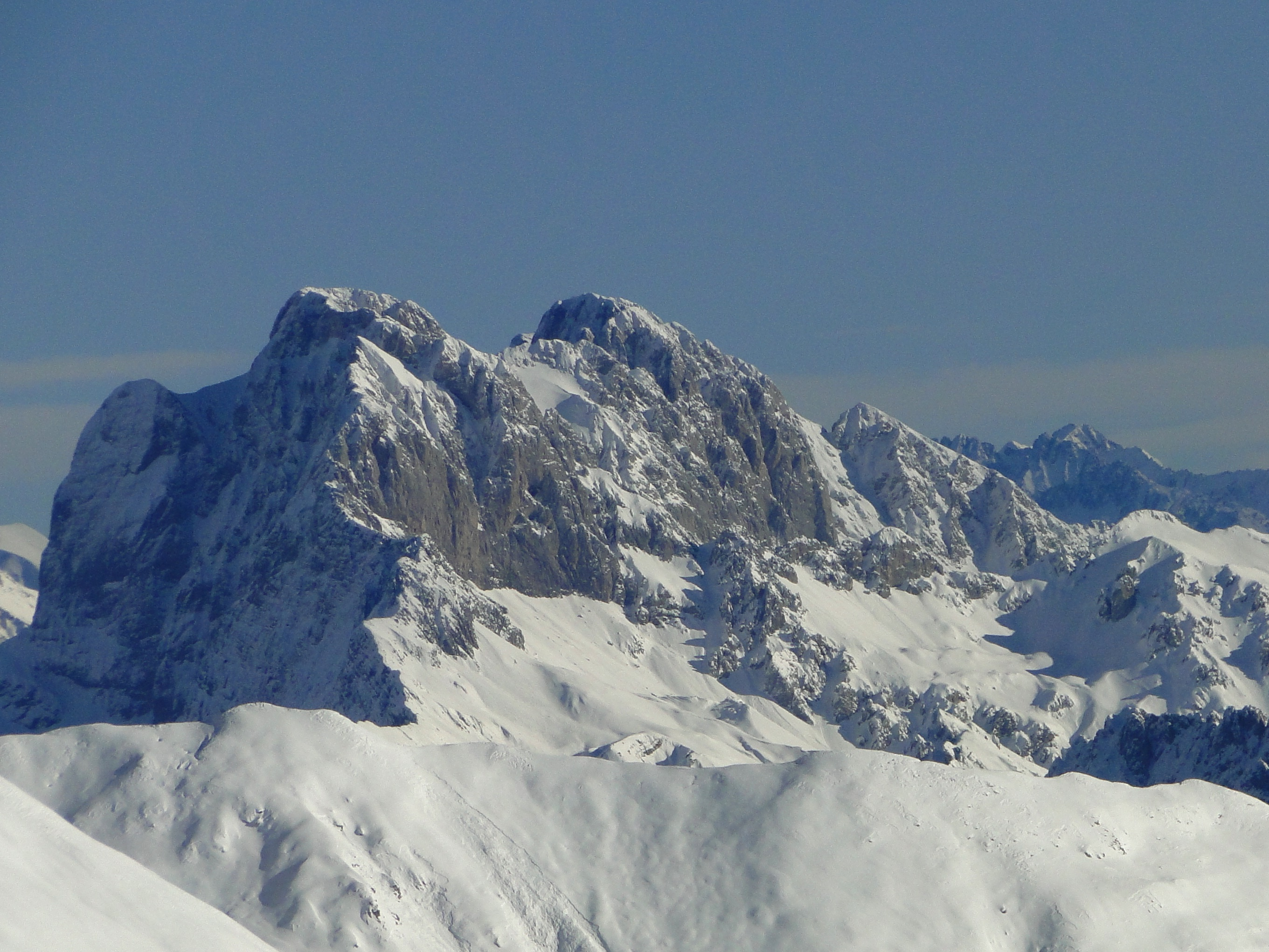

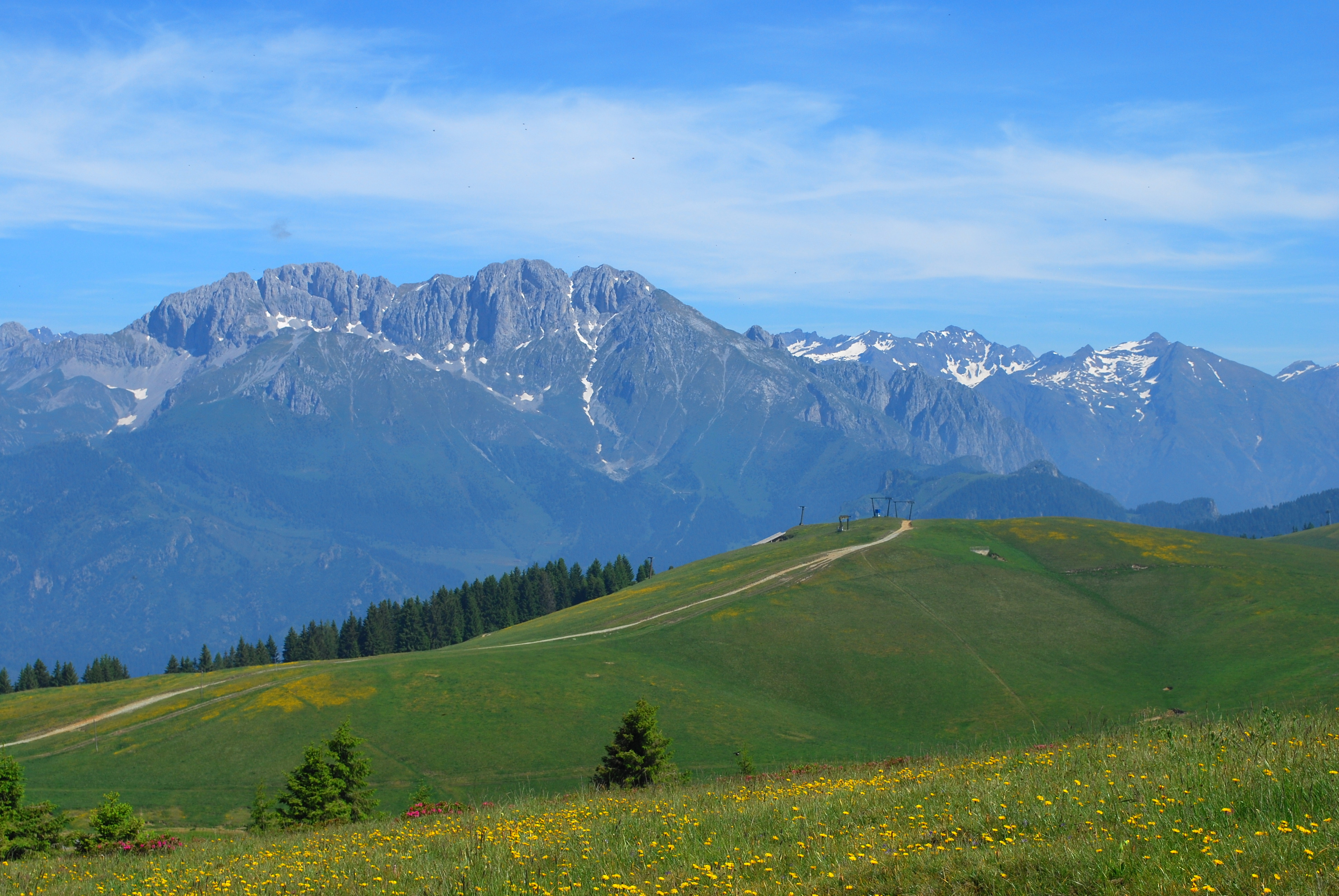

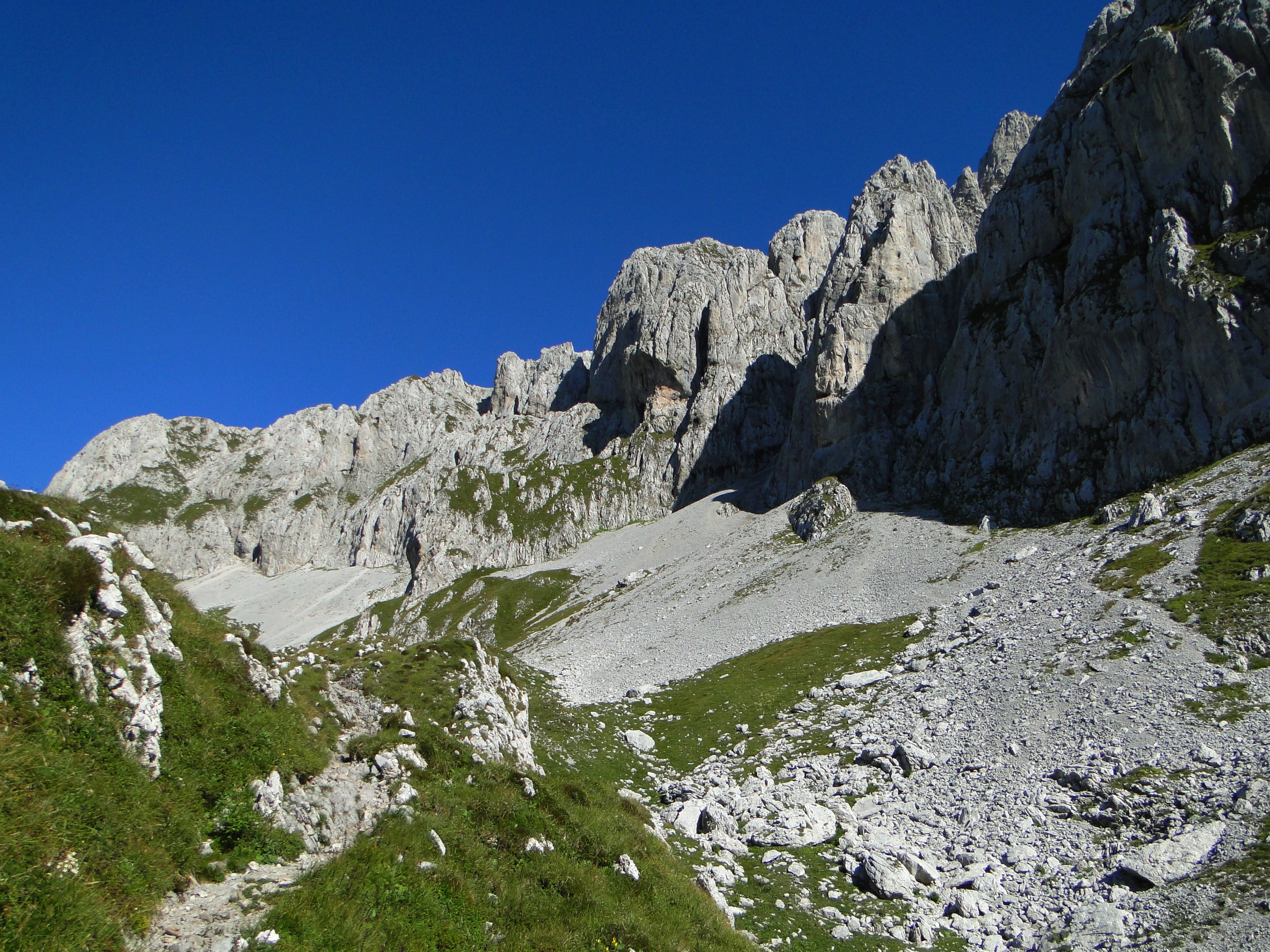

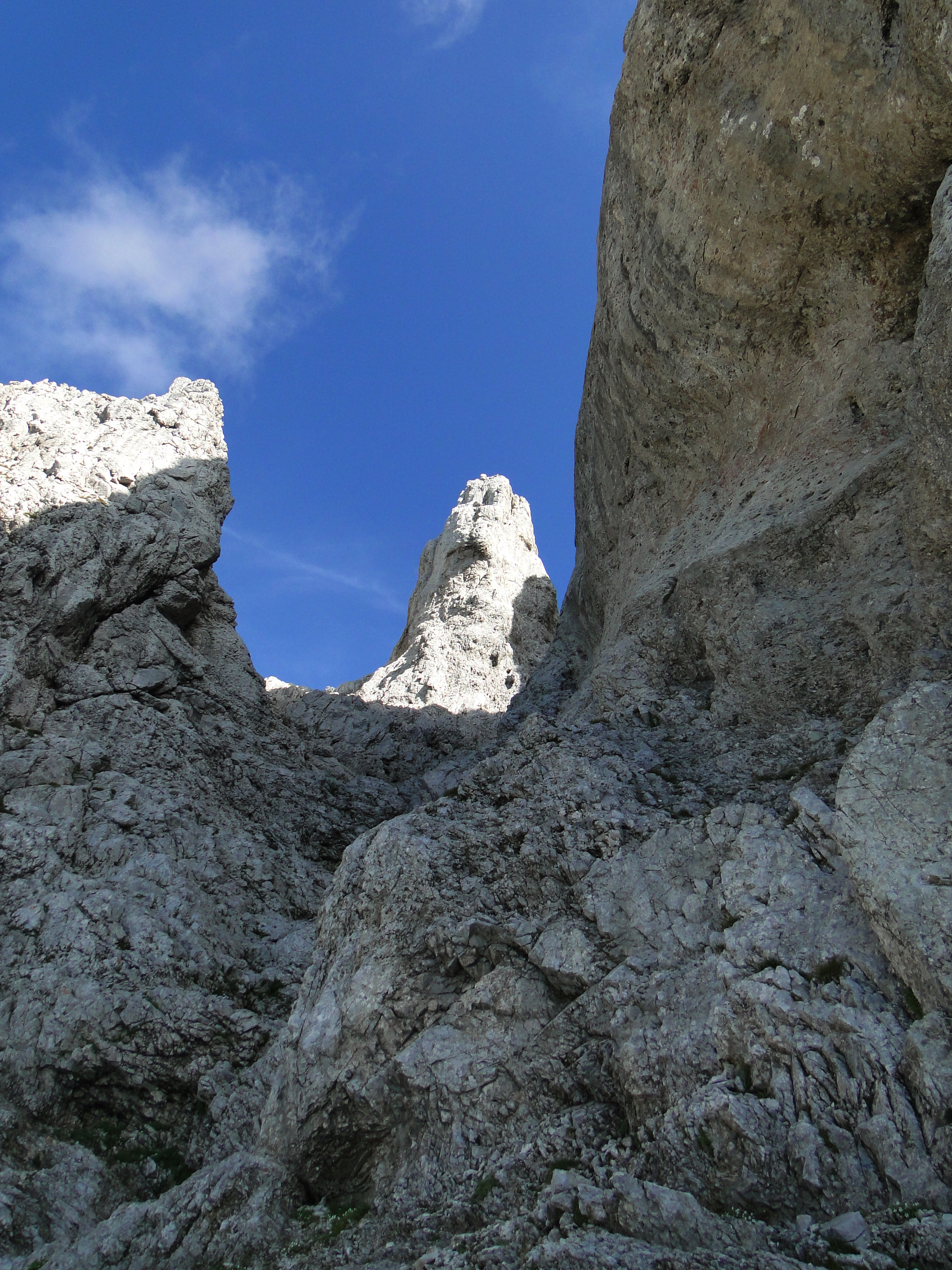
