= Pizzo Redorta =

Mountain of Lombardy, Italy

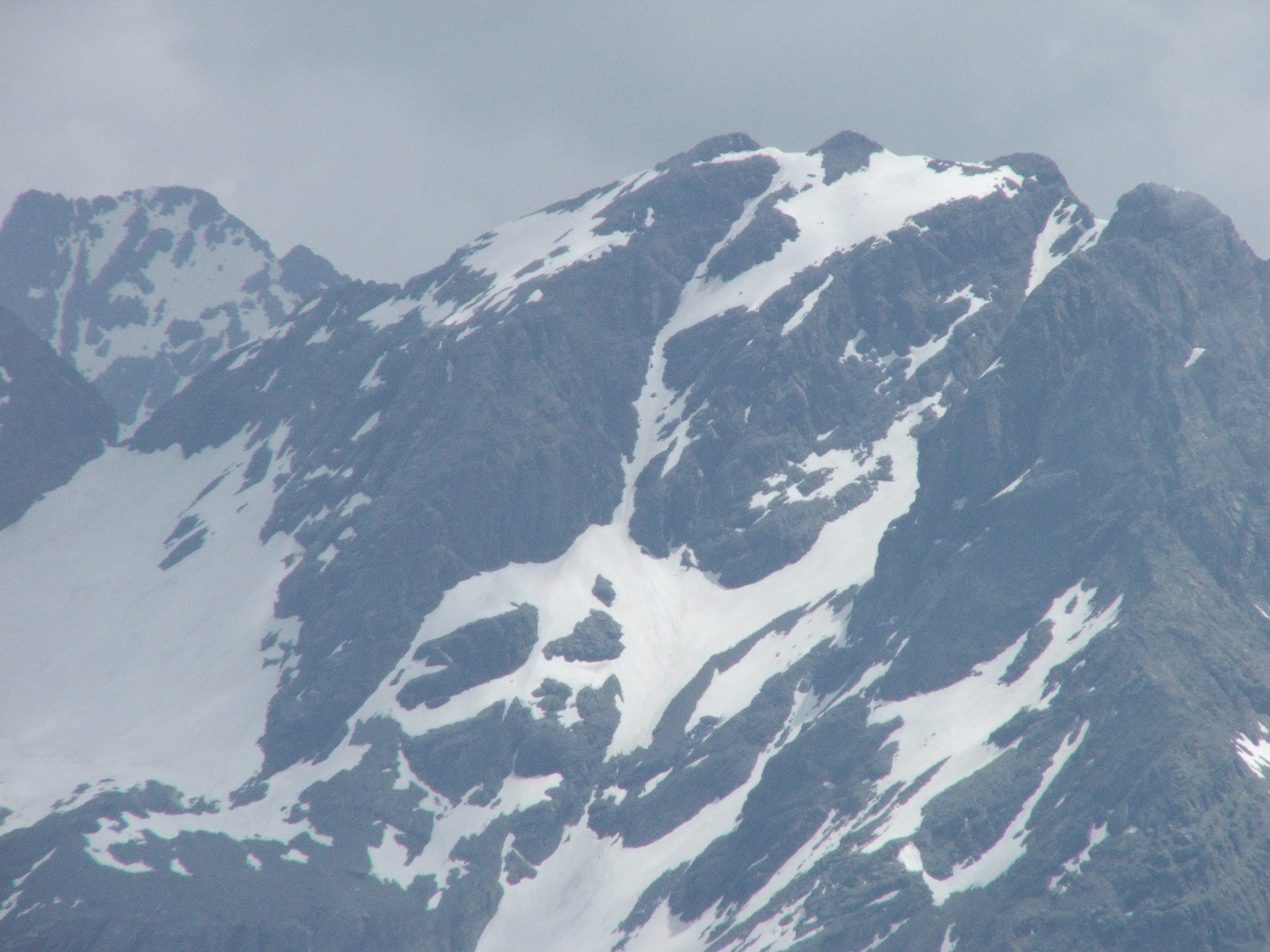

Highest point
- Elevation: 3,038 m (9,967 ft)
- Prominence: 393 m (1,289 ft)
- Coordinates: 46°03′N 9°59′E

Geography
- Location within Alps
- Location: Lombardy, Italy
- Parent range: Bergamo Alps

Pizzo Redorta is a mountain of Lombardy, Italy. It is located within the Bergamo Alps.
