= Val Brembana =

Valley in northern Italy

Coordinates: 45°52′21″N 9°39′07″E

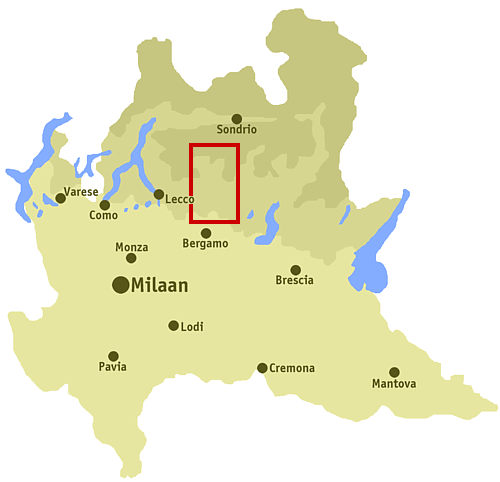
Location of Val Brembana.

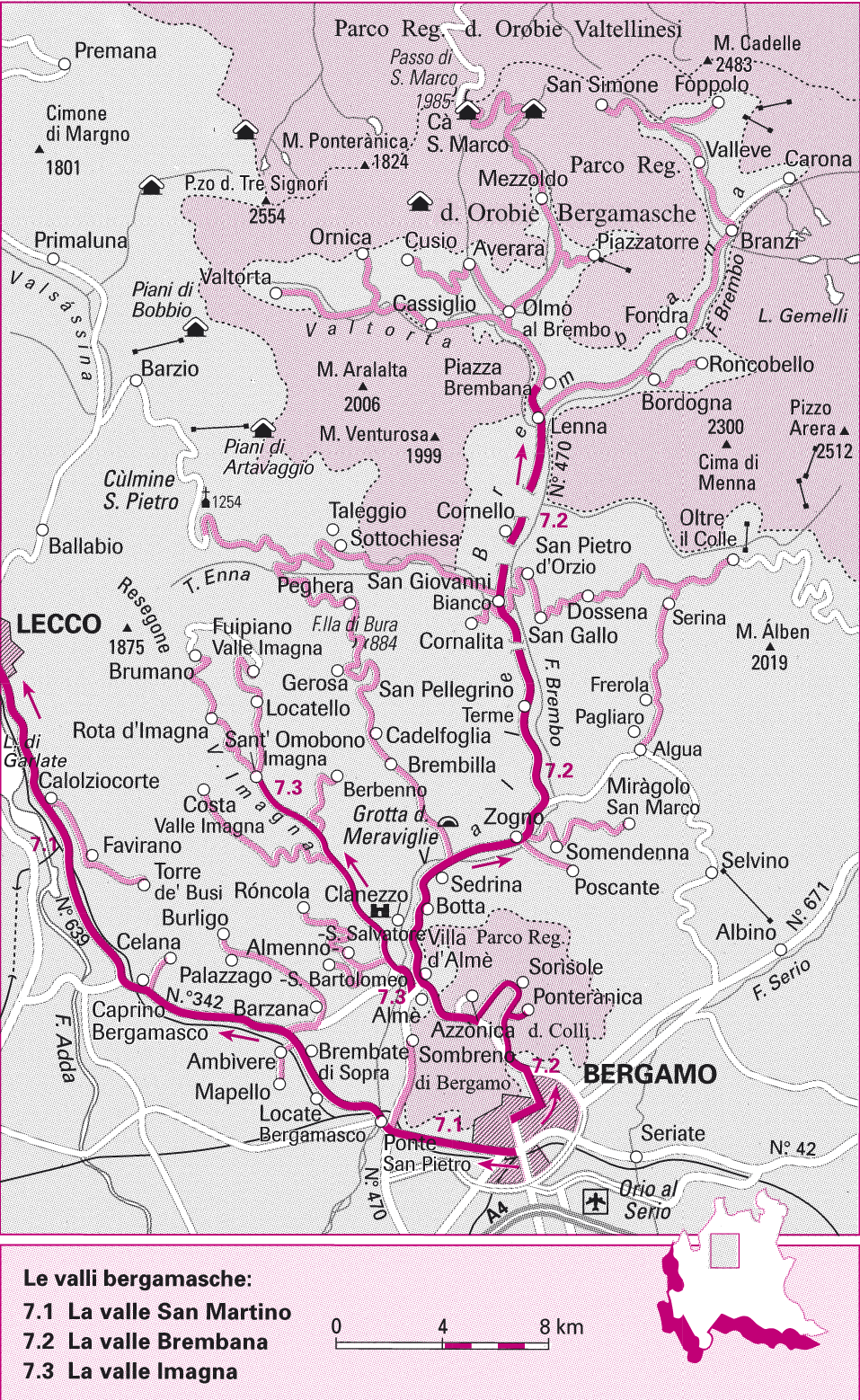
Map of the Bergamo Valleys: Val San Martino, Val Brembana, Val Imagna

Val Brembana (Lombard: Al Brembàna) is a valley in Lombardy, Northern Italy. It takes its name from the river flowing in it, the Brembo.

== Geography ==
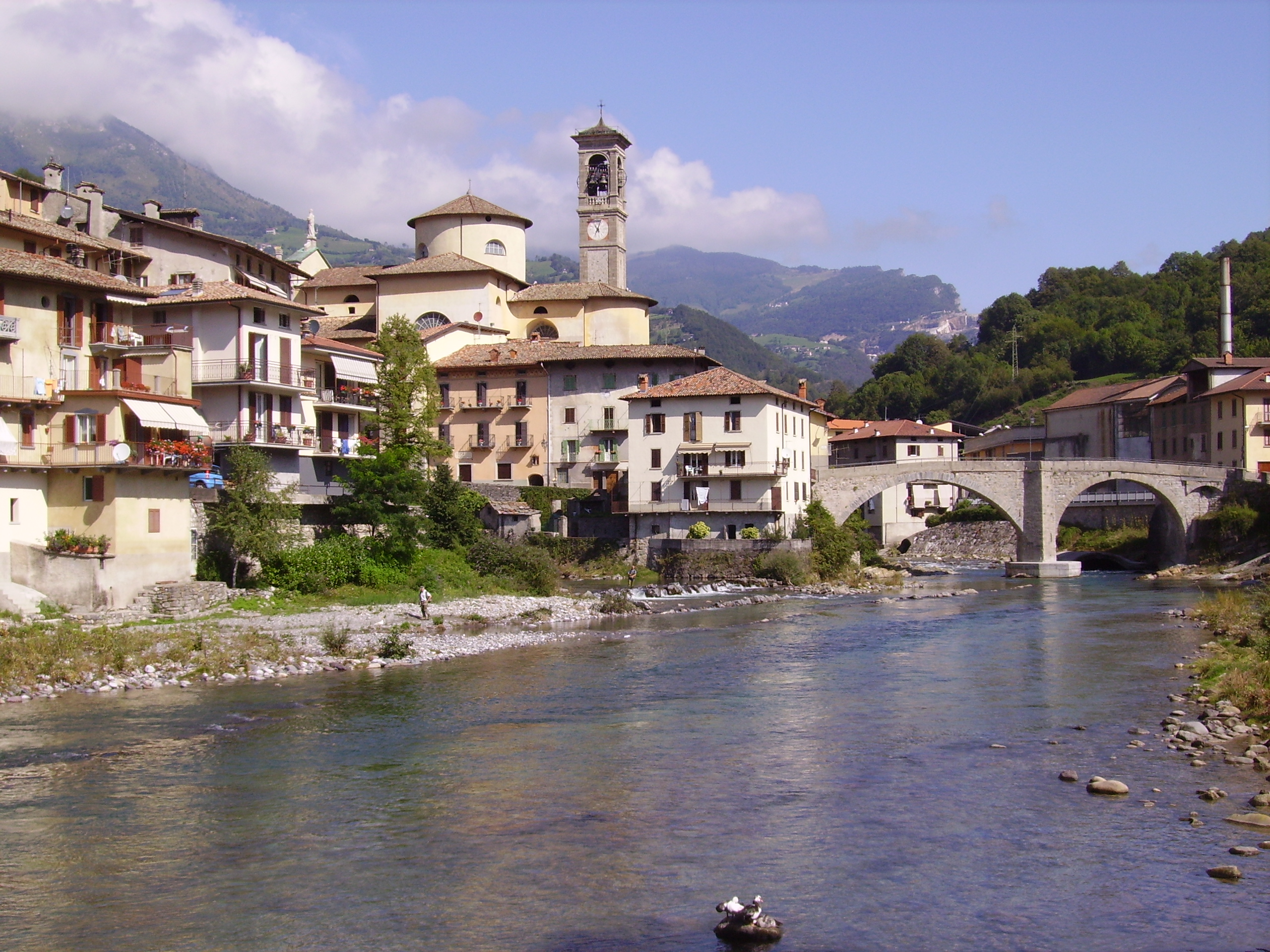
The Brembo river at San Giovanni Bianco.

The Bergamo Alps form the valley's northern limits, notably the Tre Signori and Diavolo di Tenda Peaks, while at south lies the plain of Bergamo. To the east, the valley borders with the Valle Seriana and to the west with the Valle Imagna.

The main centers of the valley is San Pellegrino Terme. Val Brembana is also the location of Simone Pianetti's massacre.

== Roads ==
The main road of Valle Brembana is the SS470 road, managed by ANAS. The valley is also linked with Valtellina by the San Marco Pass.

== Ski areas ==
Valle Brembana includes the ski areas of Foppolo, Valtorta and Piazzatorre.

== Cuisine ==
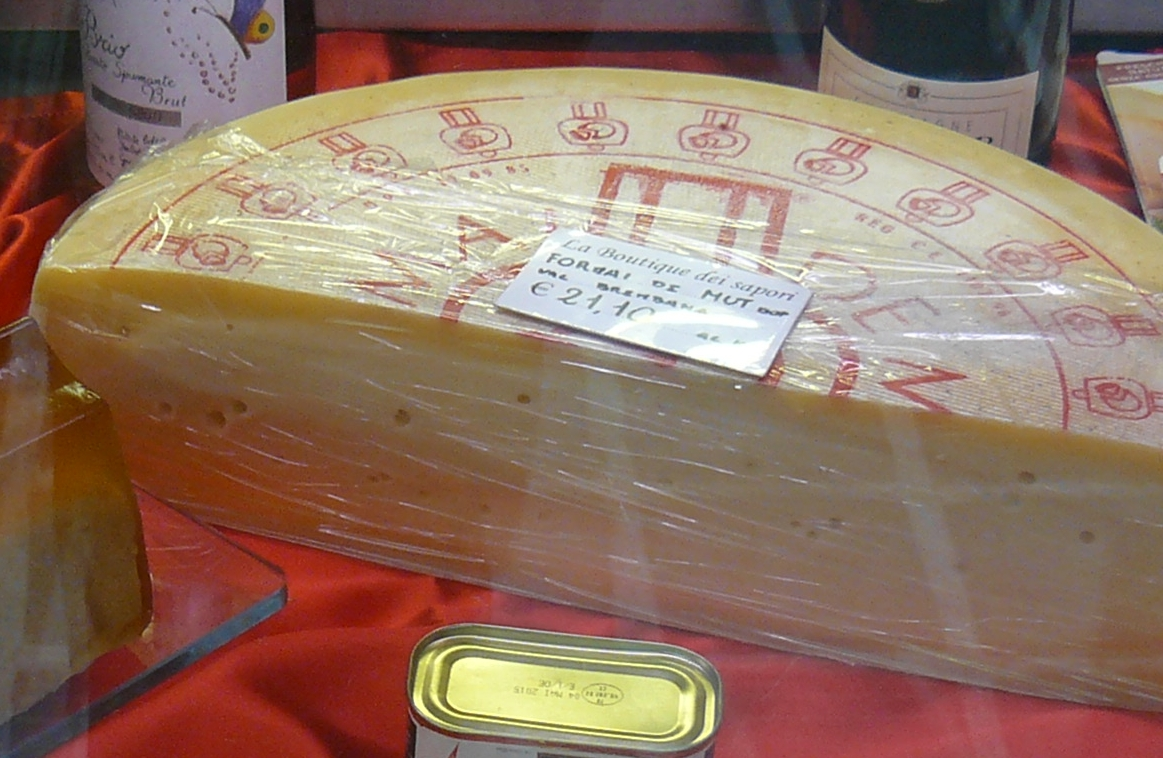
Formai de Mut dell'Alta Valle Brembana

Formai de Mut dell'Alta Valle Brembana is a cheese with protected designation of origin status that is prepared at Alta Valle Brembana. It is produced in "very limited quantities" and rarely found outside of Lombardy.

== See also ==
- Monte Alben
- Lake dei Frati
