= Pizzo Coca =

Mountain in Italy

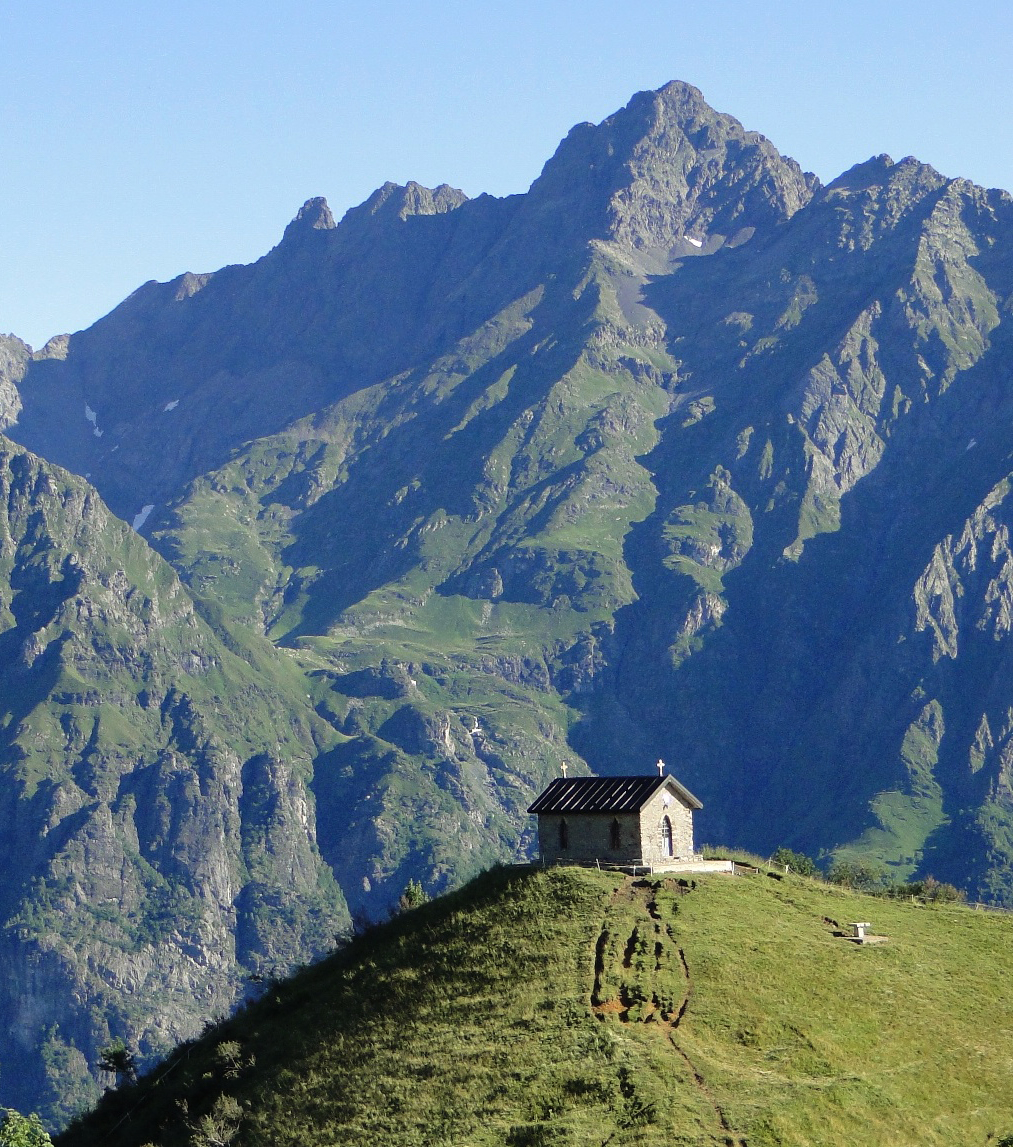
- Pizzo Coca

Highest point
- Elevation: 3,050 m (10,010 ft)
- Prominence: 1,878 m (6,161 ft)
- Parent peak: Mont Blanc
- Listing: Alpine mountains above 3000 m
- Coordinates: 46°4′7″N 10°0′42″E

Naming
- Native name: ol Coca (Lombard)

Geography
- Location within Alps
- Location: Lombardy, Italy
- Parent range: Bergamo Alps

Pizzo Coca (Lombard: ol Coca) is a mountain that straddles the Val Seriana and the Valtellina in Lombardy, Italy. It is the highest peak in the Bergamo Alps (also called the Orobie Alps). Its height is 3,050 metres with a prominence height of 1,878 metres and a saddle of 1,172 metres. A post-glacial valley exists near a point called Ometto in sassi (literally "little man in rock") at 2,400 meters.

== Geology and orogeny ==
The Alps form a part of a tertiary orogenic belt of mountain chains, called the Alpide belt, that stretches through southern Europe and Asia from the Atlantic stretching eastward to the Himalayas. The Bergamo Alps have three prominent peaks named Pizzo Coca, Punta Scaiss and Pizzo Redorta. As with its parent Alpine belt, Pizzo Coca is composed of "dark-coloured" sedimentary mountain rock with "huge rocky spurs" known as a pyramid type peak. Pizzo Coca, along with the other Bergamo crystalline peaks, exist parallel to the Valtellina Valley. Narrow and vertical chimney clefts stretch towards Pizzo Coca's summit, which has rock debris, before it levels off. The mountain rises to 2,924 meters by "Dente di Coca" (literally Tooth of Coca") before settling out by Pico Coca's summit.

== Climate ==
The Alps are split into five climate zones, each with a different kind of environment. The climate, plant life and animal life vary on different sections or zones of the mountain such as Pizzo Coca. The initial altitude at Val Seriana, one of the recommended southern access points, is 1,100 meters and part of a valley. The valley trail rises to 1,892 meters by Rifugio Coca which is a rest stop.

Pizzo Coca's Subalpine regional climate ranges to 1,800 metres with the lower levels available for cultivation. The Alpine regional climate exists between 1,800 and 2,500 meters. The Glacial regional climate extends from 2,500 to Pico Coca's top at 3,050 metres with snow falling at the higher elevations.

== Approach ==
Pizzo Coca can be reached from the south starting from Valbondione. From here the path leads to Rifugio Coca, a "hut" managed by Club Alpino Italiano based in Bergamo, then continues towards Lago di Coca. From here, before reaching the lake, climbers must crawl up the scree to the east. After this, the trail climbs quickly, then follows a semicircle along the natural amphitheatre at the foot of the Bocchetta dei Camosci. From here begins the steepest part of the path allowing climbers, after 300 to 400 meters uphill, the base of Pizzo Coca is reached.

From the peak, there is an unrestricted view to the east and the surrounding area. The Rhaetian Alps that connects to the north are visible, as is Lake Barbellino, Monte Torena, Pizzo Strinato, Monte Costone, Monte Trobio, Monte Gleno and Pizzo Recastello, Pizzo Redorta, the glacier of Marovin, and the Pizzo del Diavolo di Tenda in the west, Presolana and Pizzo Arera to the south as well as several other peaks, and beginning from the valley of the Serio River, the starting point of Valbondione.

The initial trail leads to a series of rifugios, which is Italian for refuges, like the first Rifugio Coca mountain hut. This is a hike to this stage or refuge. Past Rifugio Coca, becomes a YDS 3 or a climbing route with scrambling uphill amongst boulders, creeks, cliffs and zig-zag markers. Based upon exposure to falling and increased YDS 3+ in some hard rock climb areas, climbing equipment like rope, climbing harness, boots, crampons, ice axes, snowshoes and skis is recommended.

== Nearest services ==
Pizzo Coca's nearest airport is Orio al Serio Airport in Bergamo, Italy. The nearest "convenient center" is Valbondione.

== See also ==
- Alpine Brigade Orobica
- Swiss Alps
- List of national parks of the Alps

== Photo gallery ==
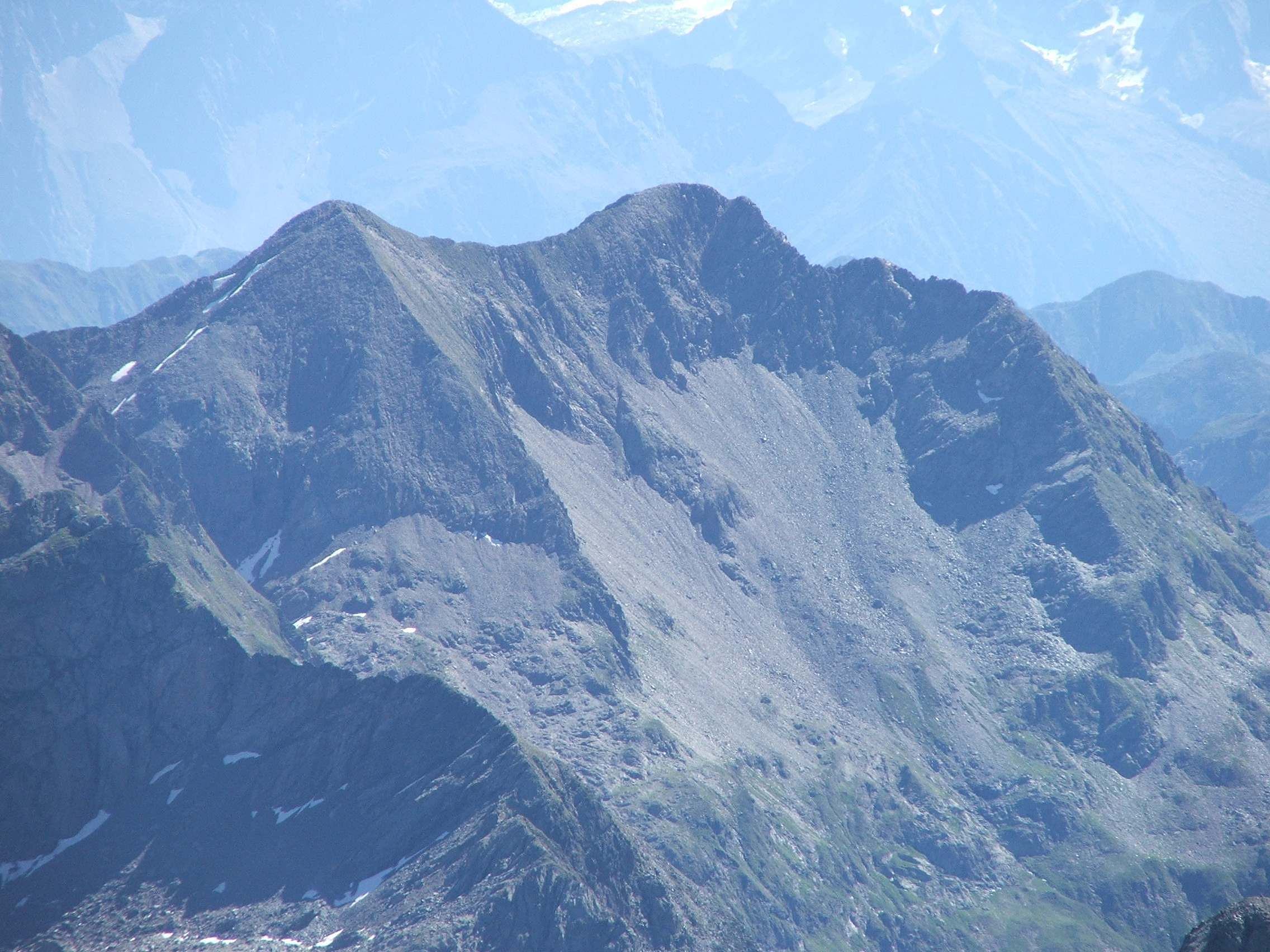
Looking south Monte Torena from Pizzo Coca

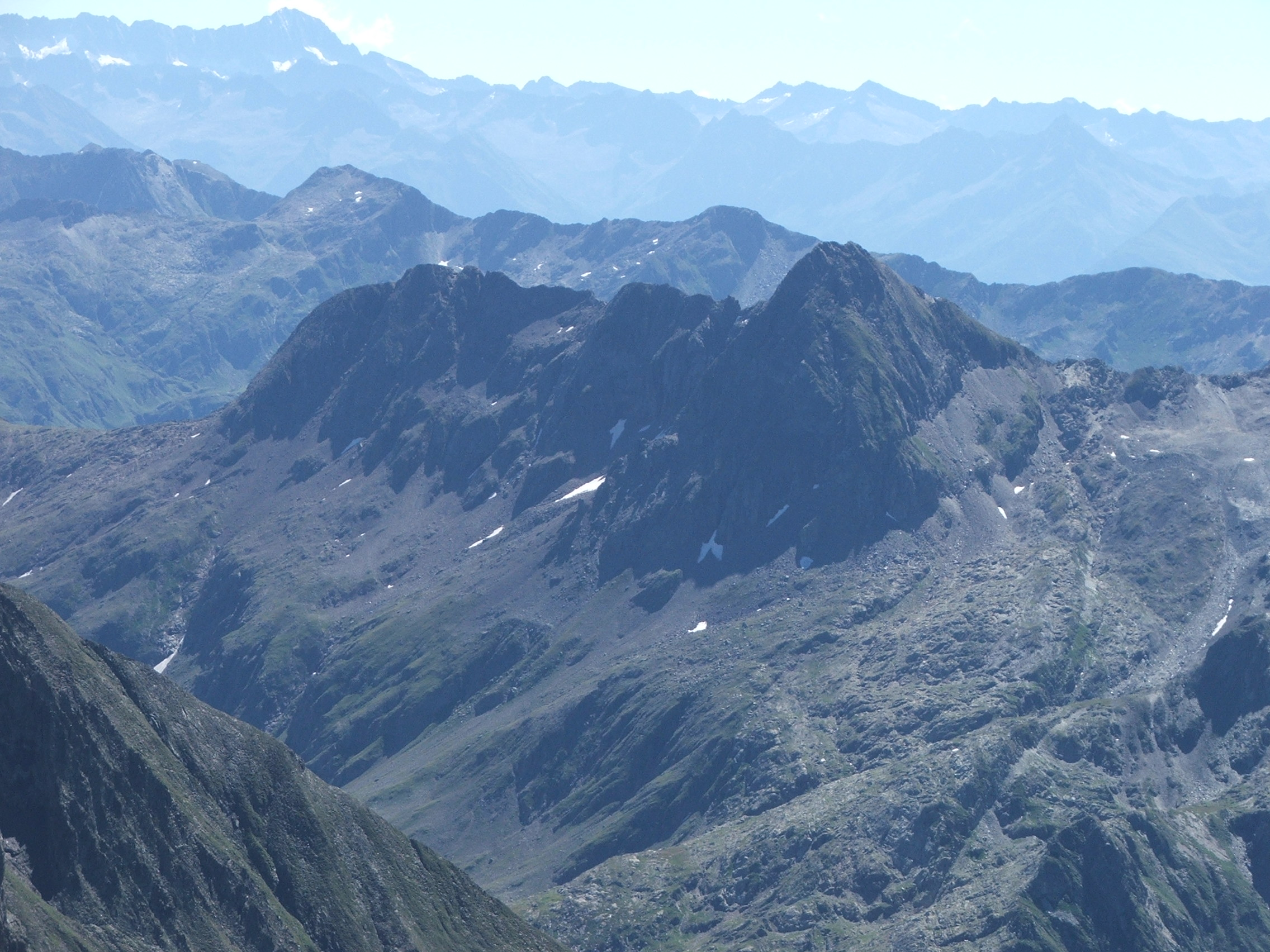
Looking south Pizzo Strinato

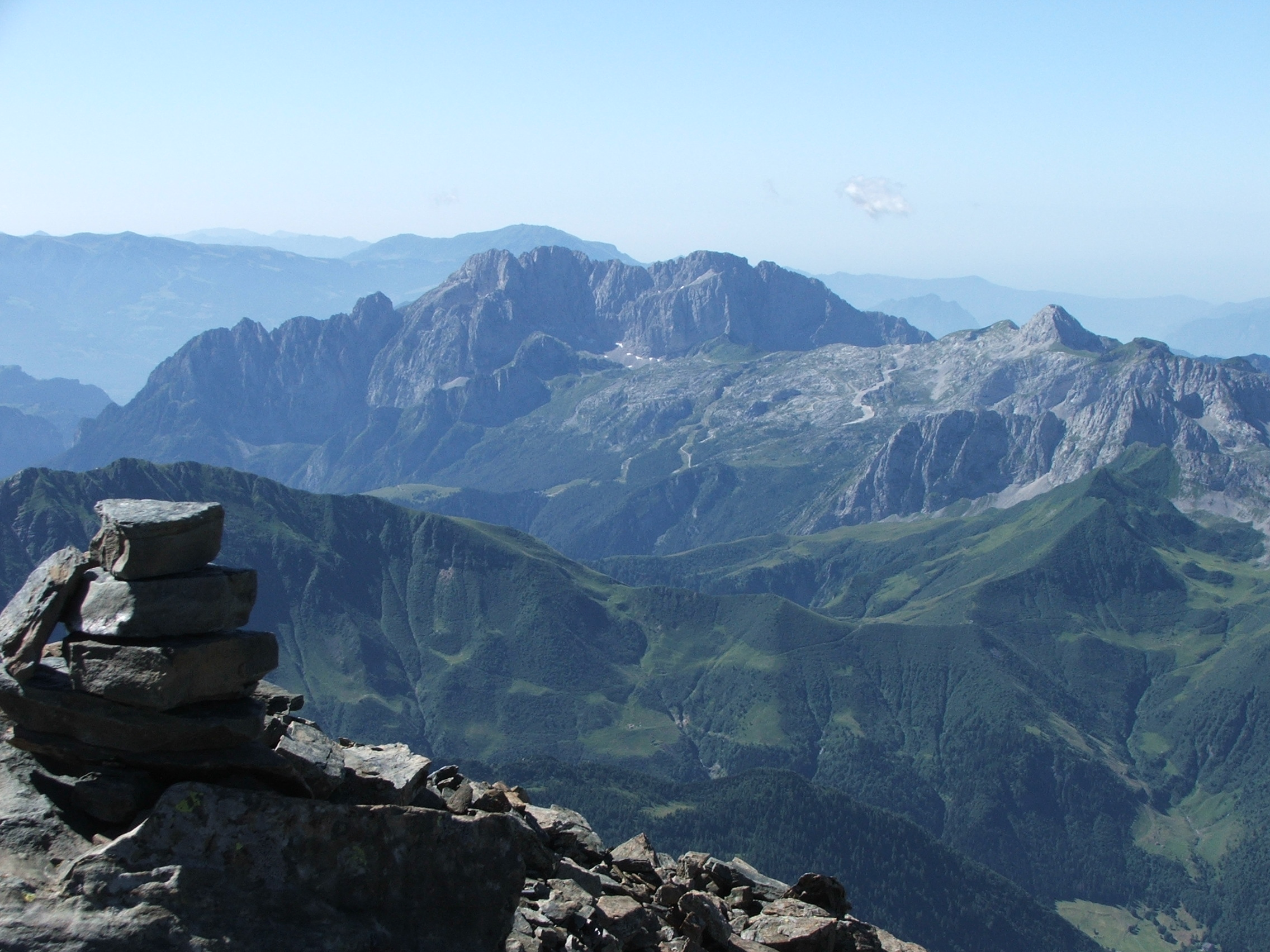
Looking at Presolana

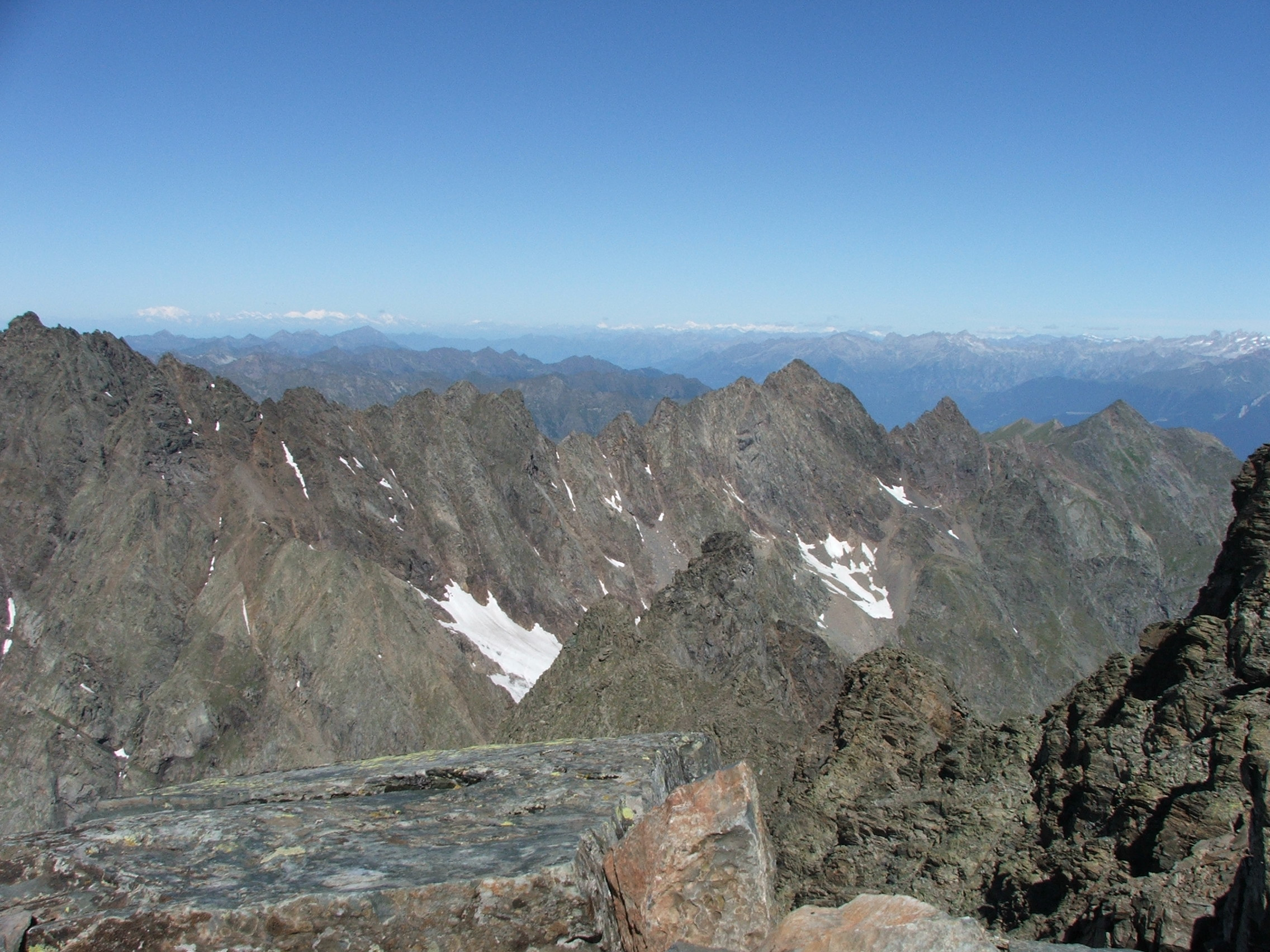
The crown view from Pizzo Coca

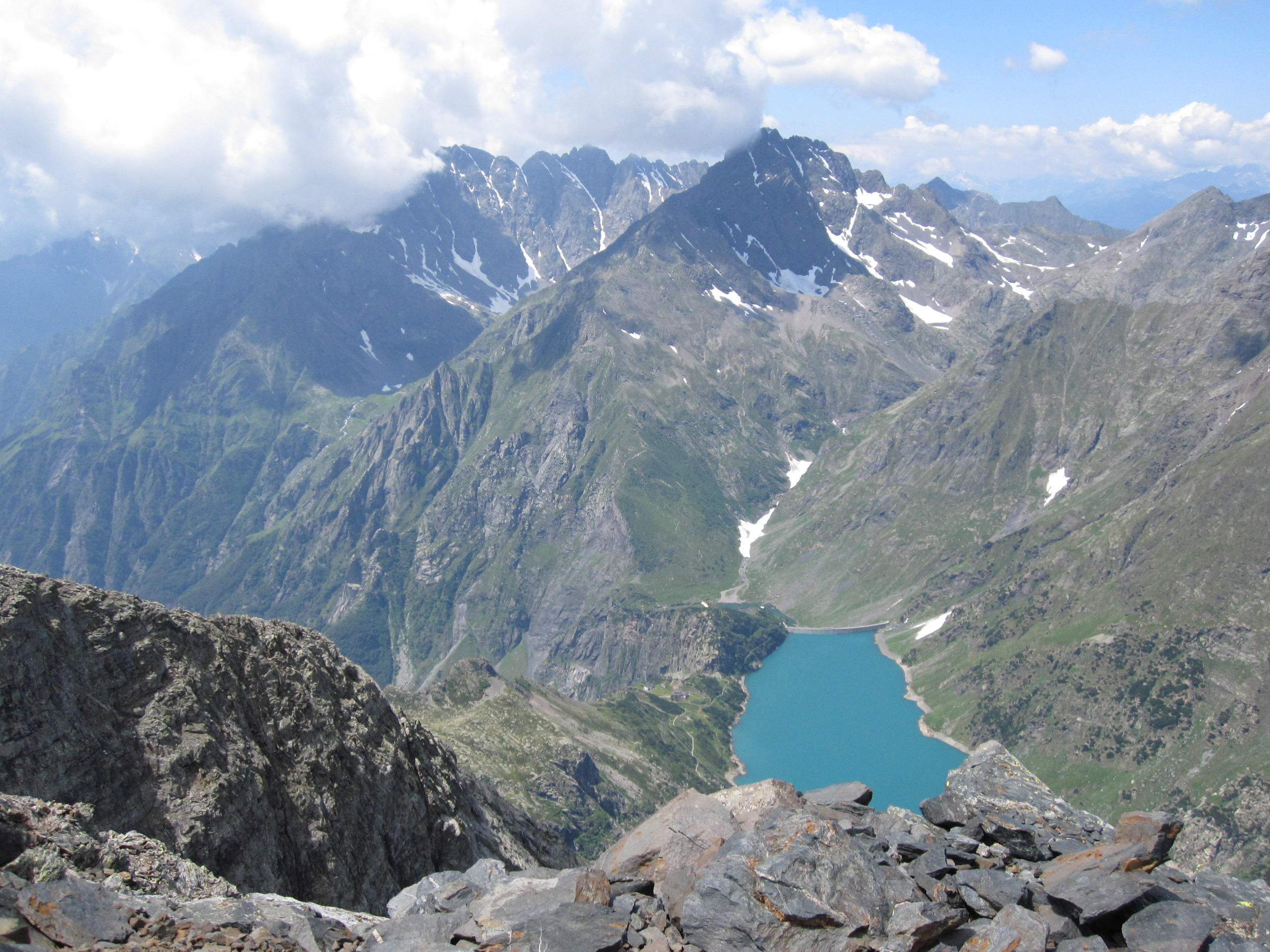
Pizzo di Coca

== Sources ==
- Europe Ultra-Prominences www.peaklist.org Retrieved: 2010-05-11.
- "Pizzo Coca". Peakware.com. Archived from the original on 2016-03-04.
- Pizzo di Coca A Google translation Retrieved: 2010-05-11
