= Pizzo Strinato =

Mountain in Italy

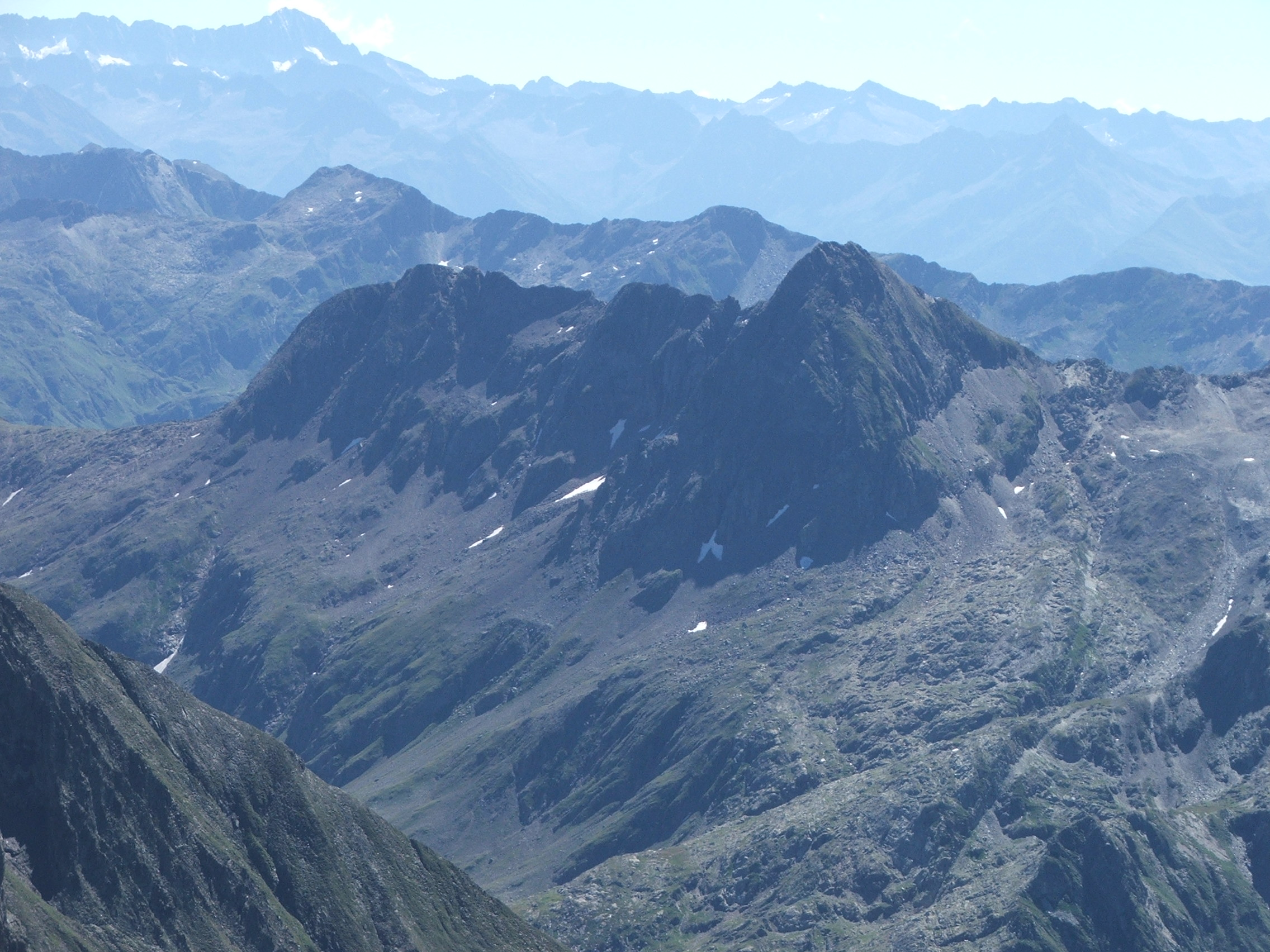

Highest point
- Elevation: 2,836 m (9,304 ft)
- Coordinates: 46°4′N 10°5′E

Geography
- Location within Lombardy
- Location: Lombardy, Italy
- Parent range: Bergamo Alps

Pizzo Strinato is a mountain of Lombardy, Italy. It is located within the Bergamo Alps, approximately 55 kilometres (34 mi) northeast of Bergamo. It rises 1,379 metres (4,524 ft) above Lago Belviso to the east and 703 metres (2,306 ft) above Lago del Barbellino to the northwest, forming a ridge with Monte Torena and Monte Costone between the two lakes.

Like many mountains in the region, it consists mostly of alternating sedimentary layers of S3 acidic volcanics extending the Collio Formation, which are deformed into sigmoid shapes by repeated minor thrust deformations on the north face and by the more significant D4 deformation event on the southeast face.

Its highest ledges are home to the rare Eight-petal avens.
