= Malgin =

Malgin (Russian: Мальгин) is a Russian masculine surname. Its feminine counterpart is Malgina. It may refer to

- Denis Malgin (born 1997), Swiss professional ice hockey forward
- Dmitri Malgin (born 1987), Kazakhstani ice hockey goaltender
- Irina Malgina (born 1973), Russian biathlete

== See also ==
- Lago della Malgina, a lake in Italy
