= Roc du Bécoin =

Mountain in France

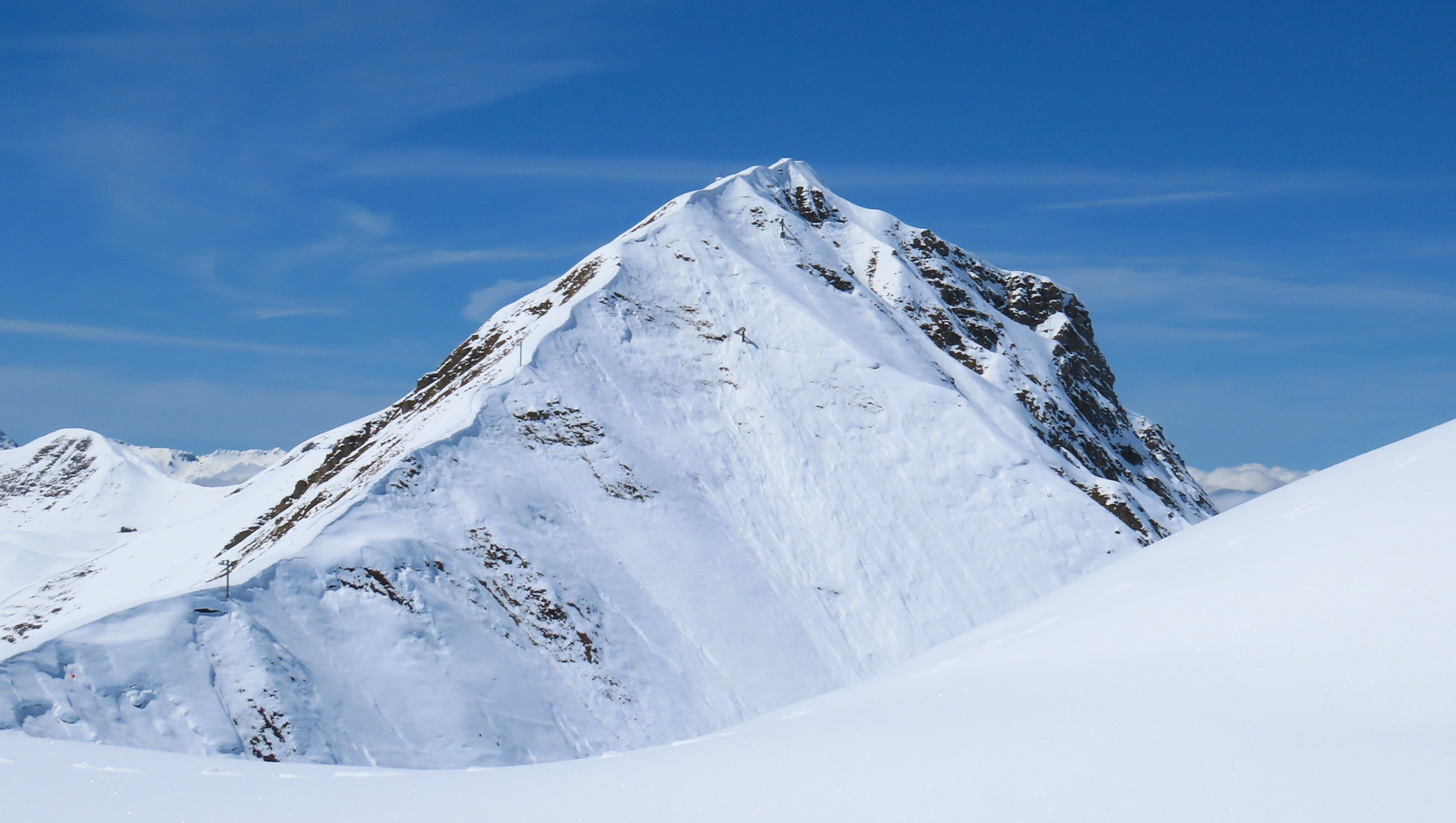
- East aspect

Highest point
- Elevation: 2,594 m (8,510 ft)
- Prominence: 327 m (1,073 ft)
- Parent peak: Gran Paradiso
- Isolation: 9.38 km (5.83 mi)
- Listing: Mountains of the Alps
- Coordinates: 45°29′33″N 6°39′50″E

Geography
- Location within Alps Location within France
- Interactive map of Roc du Bécoin
- Country: France
- Department: Savoie
- Region: Auvergne-Rhône-Alpes
- Parent range: Alps; Graian Alps; Vanoise Massif

Climbing
- Easiest route: Trail

Roc du Bécoin is a mountain in the Auvergne-Rhône-Alpes region of France.

== Description ==
Roc du Bécoin is a 2,594-metre-elevation (8,510-foot) summit in the Vanoise Massif of the French Alps. Precipitation runoff from the mountain drains into tributaries of the Isère. Topographic relief is significant as the summit rises 1,800 metres (5,906 feet) above the community of Bozel in five kilometres (3.1 mi). The summit can be reached via a trail.

== Climate ==
According to the Köppen climate classification system, Roc du Bécoin is located in an alpine climate zone. Weather fronts are forced upward by the Alps (orographic lift), causing moisture to drop in the form of rain or snowfall onto the range. This climate supports the La Plagne ski resort on the northeastern slope of the peak.

== Gallery ==
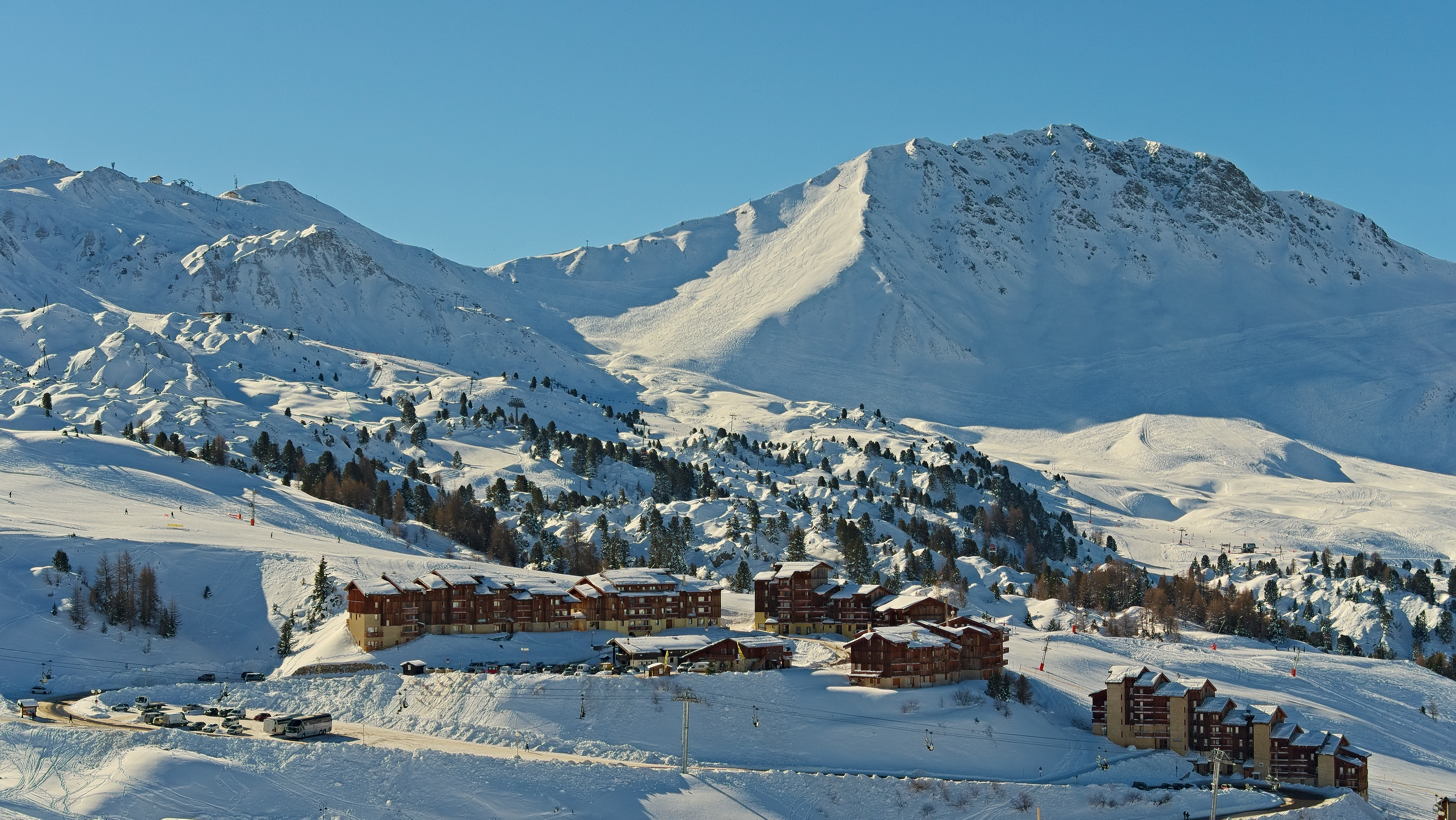
Northeast aspect viewed from Plagne Villages

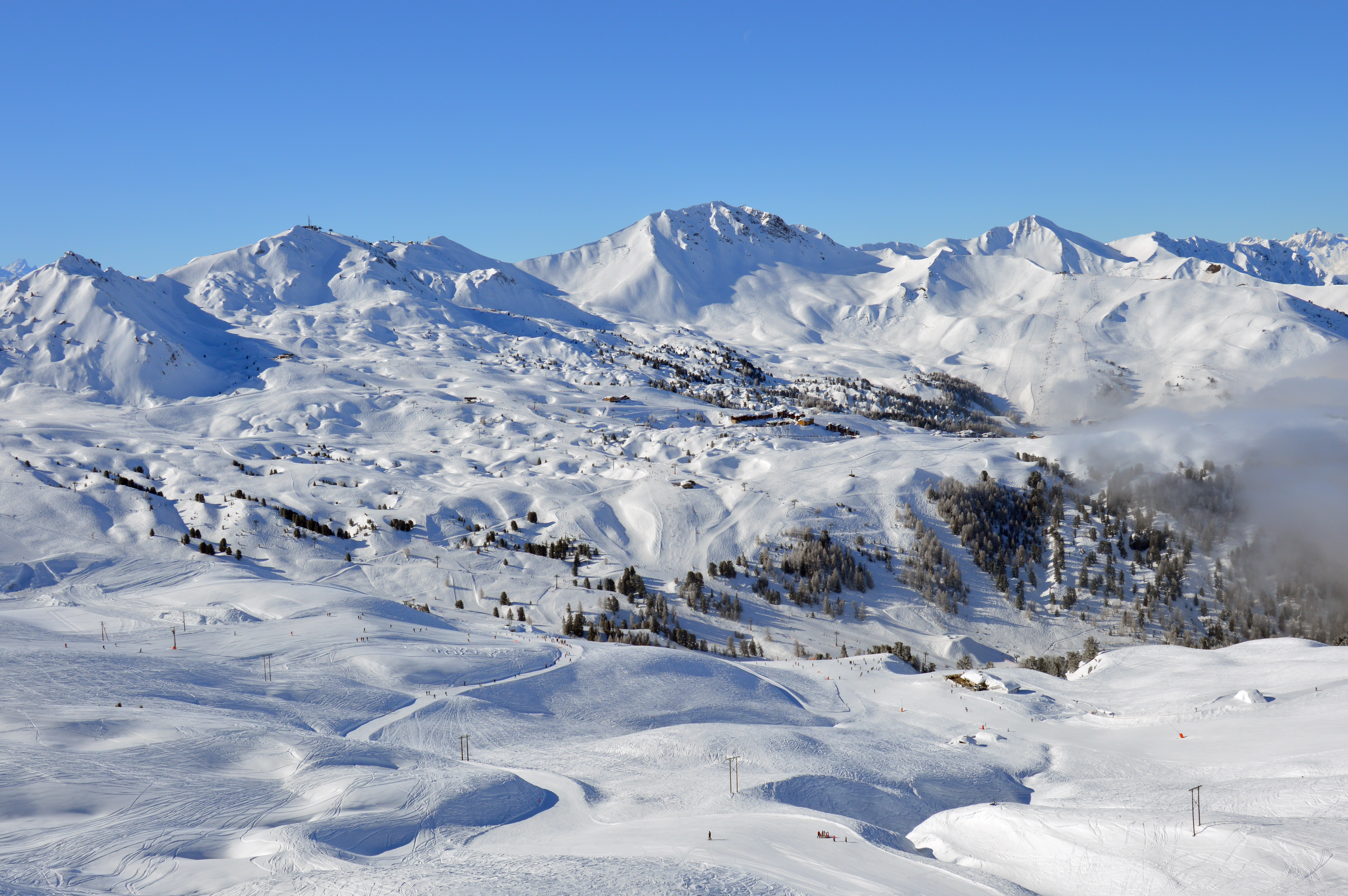
Roc du Bécoin centered on skyline

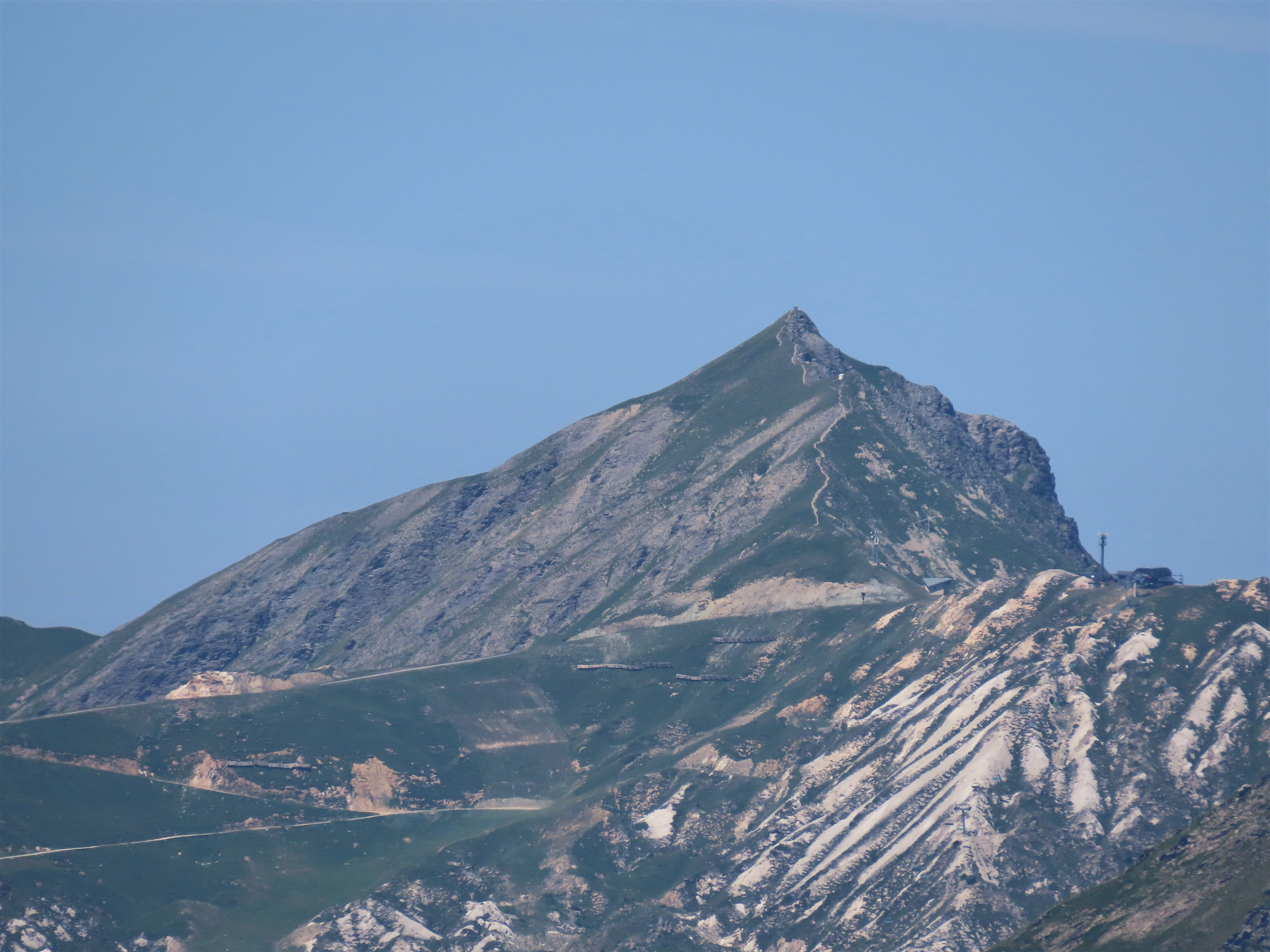

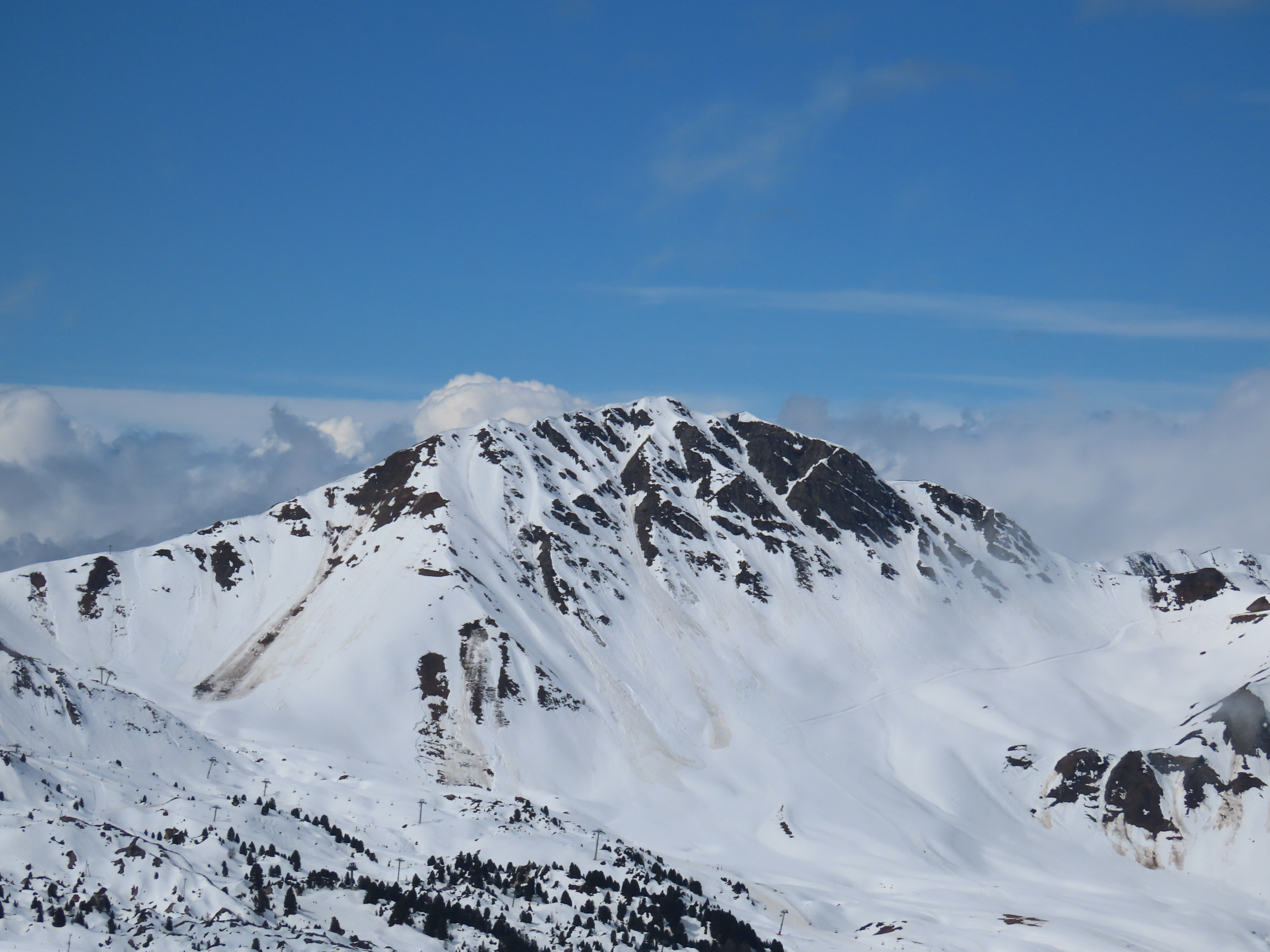

== See also ==
- Climate of the Alps
