= Lago del Barbellino =

Artificial lake in Lombardy, Italy

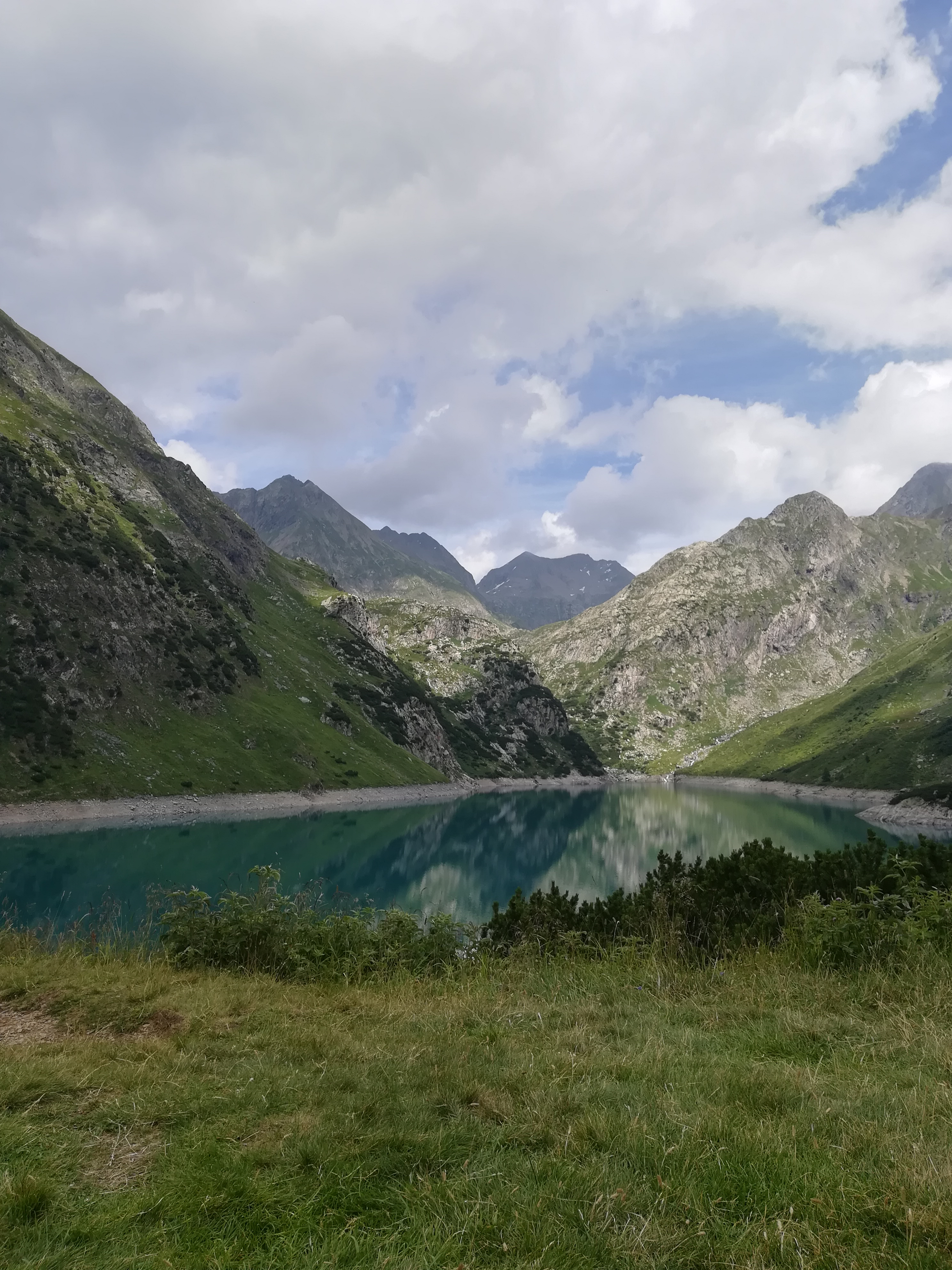

- Location within Italy
- Location: Province of Bergamo, Lombardy
- Coordinates: 46.064°N 10.051°E
- Type: reservoir
- Primary inflows: Torrente Serio, Torrente Trobio
- Primary outflows: Fiume Serio
- Basin countries: Italy
- Max. length: 1,000 m (3,300 ft)
- Max. width: 300 m (980 ft)
- Max. depth: 60 m (196.85 ft)
- Water volume: 0,0185 km^{3} (14998.19 acre ft)
- Surface elevation: 1,862 m (6,109 ft)
- Islands: No
- References: Valbondione, Giovanni Simoncelli

Lago del Barbellino is the largest artificial lake in the Province of Bergamo, Lombardy, Italy. It is located in Valbondione among the Bergamasque Alps. The reservoir contains 18.5 million cubic metres of water. In 1931 a dam was built to supply hydroelectric power to the Seriana Valley where the textile industry was rapidly developing.

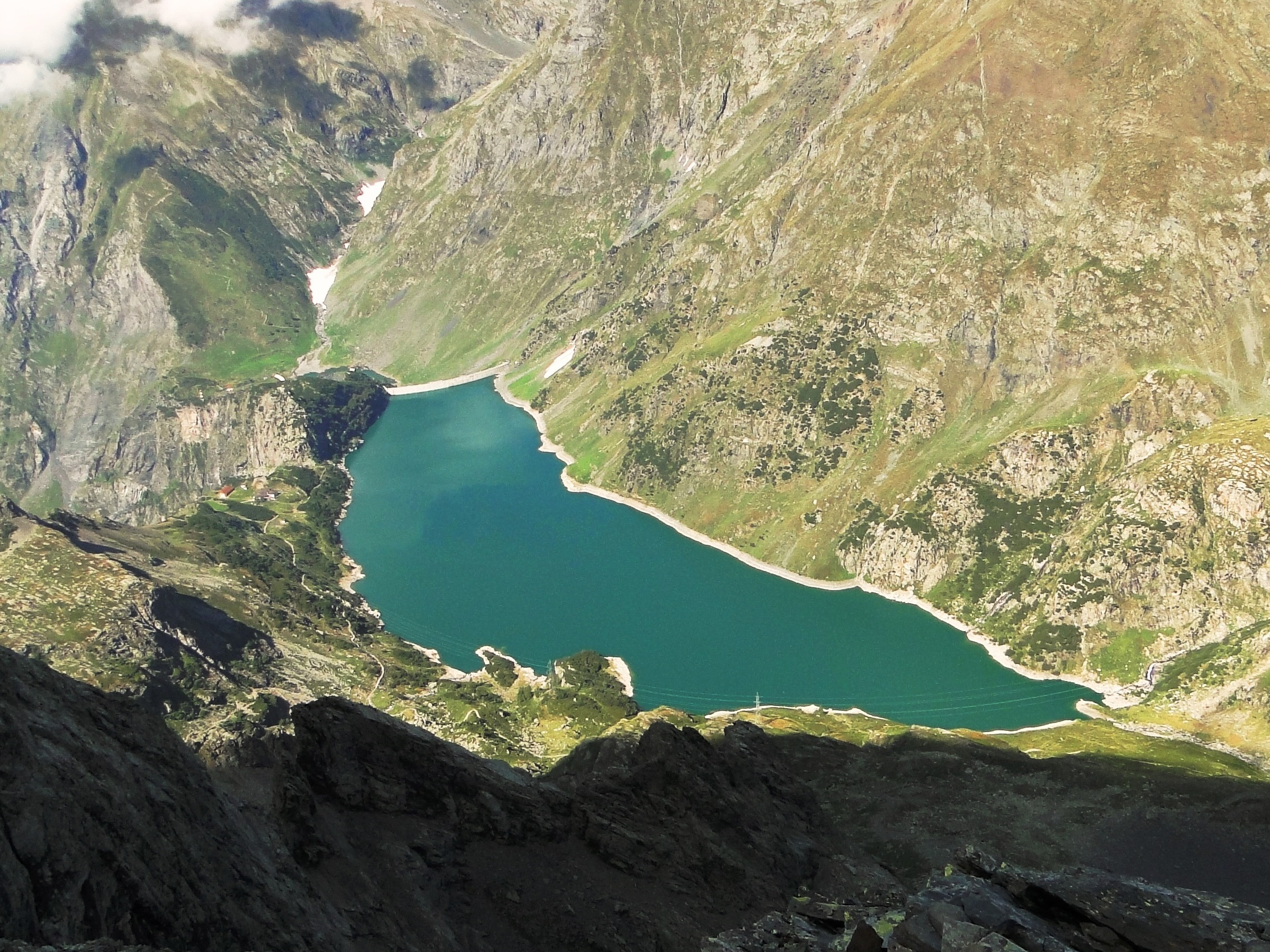
Top view of the lake from the Peak Recastello (2886 m)

== Denomination ==
The denomination of Barbellino comes from Mount Barbellino, which in the past referred to the mountains that surround the lake. It is located on the border with Valtellina.

== Geography ==
It is located at 1862 metres above sea level (6,109 ft) among the following valleys:

- Trobio Valley
- Cerviera Valley
- Malgina Valley
- Lake Valley
- Natural Barbellino Lake/ Serio (river)' sources

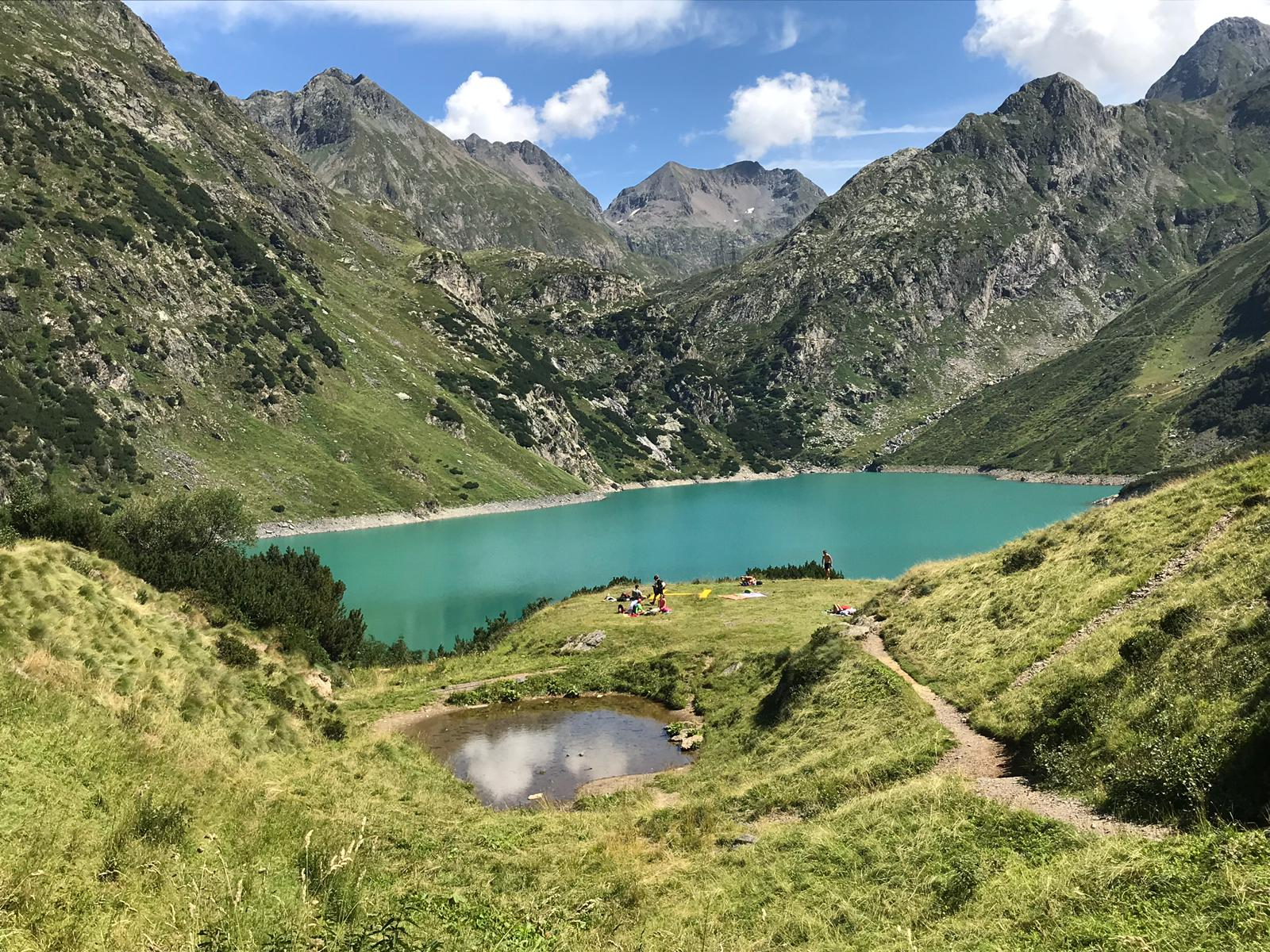
Barbellino Lake surrounded by the summits

The reservoir is mostly surrounded by the Bergamasque Alps whose summits can be reachable thanks to the C.A.I. paths. The main peaks located around the lake are:

- Northward, Peak Cappuccello (2714 m), Peak of Cavrel (2824 m), Peak of Diavolo della Malgina (2924 m)
- Eastward, Peak Strinato (2836 m), Monte Costone (2836 m)
- Southward, Monte Trobio (2865 m), Monte Gleno (2882 m), Peak of Tre Confini (2824 m), Peak Recastello (2886 m), Corni Neri (2650 m), Monte Verme (2189 m).

The artificial lake is part of the IT2060506 Belviso Barbellino site which is placed on the northern part of the Province of Bergamo, on the border with the Province of Sondrio. After Lombardy Region request in 2005, the site was classified as Special Protection Area (SPA) by the Ministry of the Environment (Italy). In 2006 the management of the site was given to the Azienda Faunistico Venatoria (A.F.V.) "Valbelviso-Barbellino".

=== Features ===
18.500.000 m³ of water (14998,19 acre ft) are contained into the reservoir and its capacity corresponds to 19.500.000 m³ (6.886360 ft³). The lake is 1 km long (0.0003048 ft), 300 m large (984.25 ft) and 60 m deep (196.85 ft). Its surface corresponds to 053 km^{2} (20 sq mi).

Its peculiar greenish colour is due to the turbid water of Trobio stream, one of the tributaries of the lake which comes from the high Gleno glacier (or Trobio glacier). The colour of its waters is cloudy because of the presence of the glacial loam. It is mud produced by the erosion of the debris carried by the glacier, on the softer rocks of the stream bed.

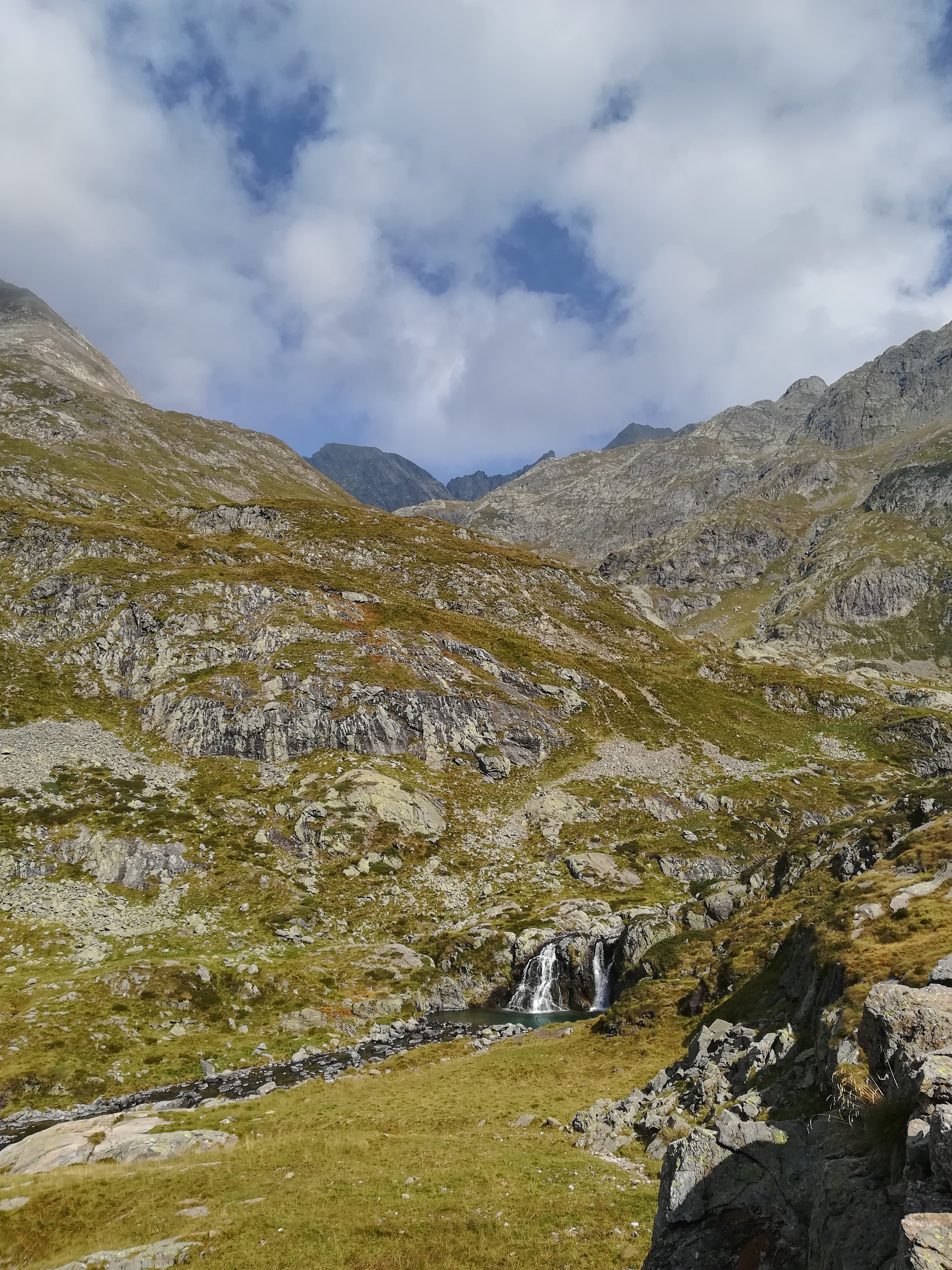
Serio stream which comes from North-East

== Hydrography ==
The reservoir receives the water coming from several tributaries, here the most important ones:

- from North-East, Serio stream, coming from Malgina lake (2339 m) and Natural Barbellino lake (2128 m). This last one is connected to the two Serio's sources located higher
- from South-East, Trobio stream coming from Trobio glacier (2760 m)
- from South, Cerviera stream, created by Cerviera lakes (2325 m) located on Monte Cimone

Its emissary is Serio (river).

== Geology ==
The basin which contains the water has glacial origins. This means it derives from the glacial plucking of a very ancient glacier. The particular position of Valbondione and the strong snowfalls encouraged the development of glaciers during the past. Nowadays, Gleno glacier (or Trobio glacier) is the only one that still exists in Valbondione. The bottom of the glacial basin of the Barbellino is about 800 m long and it is surrounded by sheepbacks.

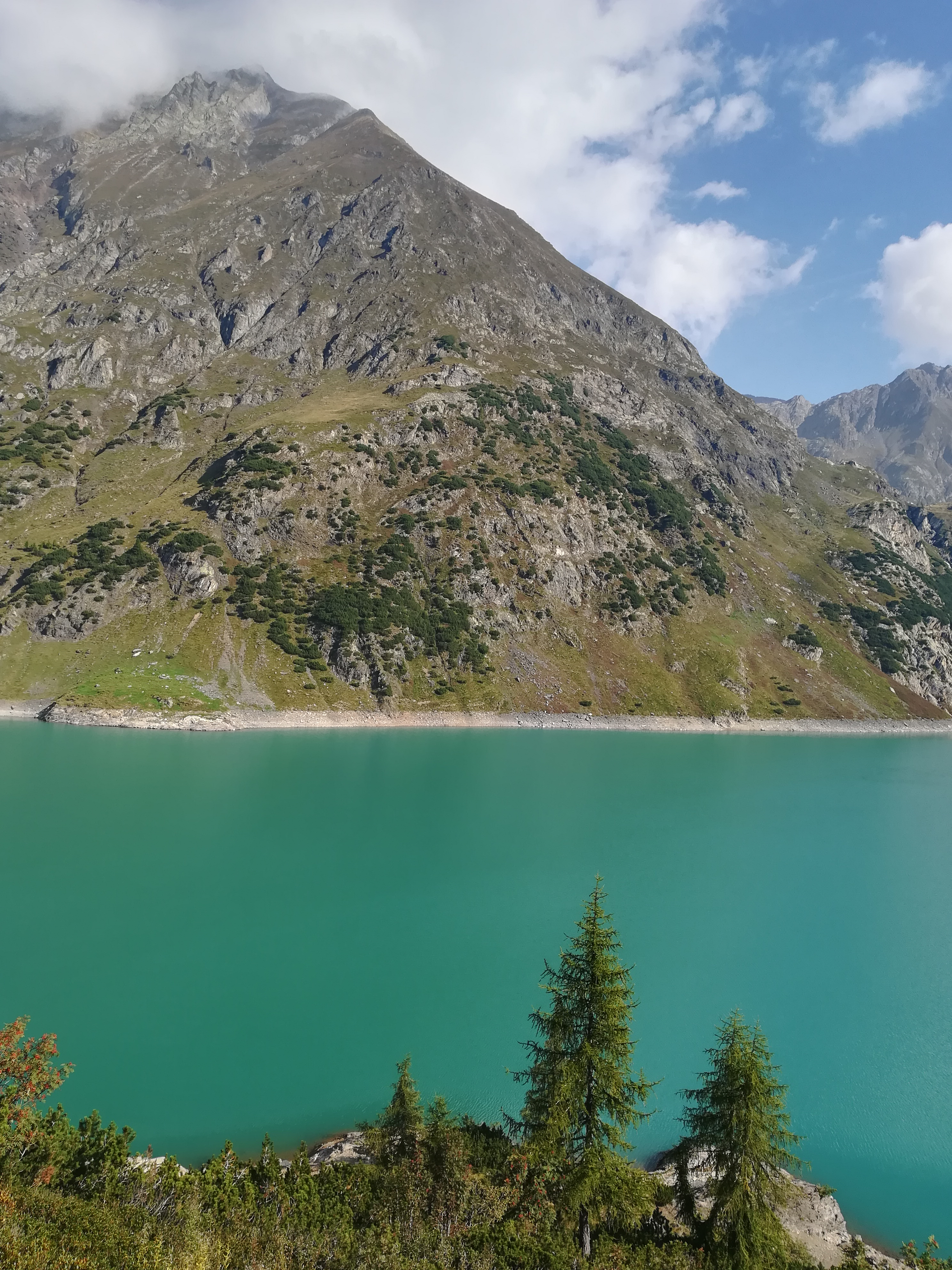
Clear sight of the steep shores

== Morphology ==
Now, the area surrounding the lake is grazing land. The soils are boreal podzols characterized by conifer woods on silicate mineral substratum. The shores of the lake are steep.

== Climate ==
Since the lake is located in the highest part of the Province of Bergamo, the climate is cold temperate:

- annual average temperature not more than 2,9 °C
- annual average temperature of the coldest month lower than -6 °C
- annual average temperature of the hottest month not more than 9,9 °C
- annual average thermal amplitude between 15 °C and 18 °C

The Orobie Alps area surrounding the lake has the heaviest rainfall in the province of Bergamo, reaching 1,800 mm/year. Concerning snowfalls, the area is characterized by relevant phenomenons with numbers that exceed 500 cm per year.

== The dam ==
Barbellino dam
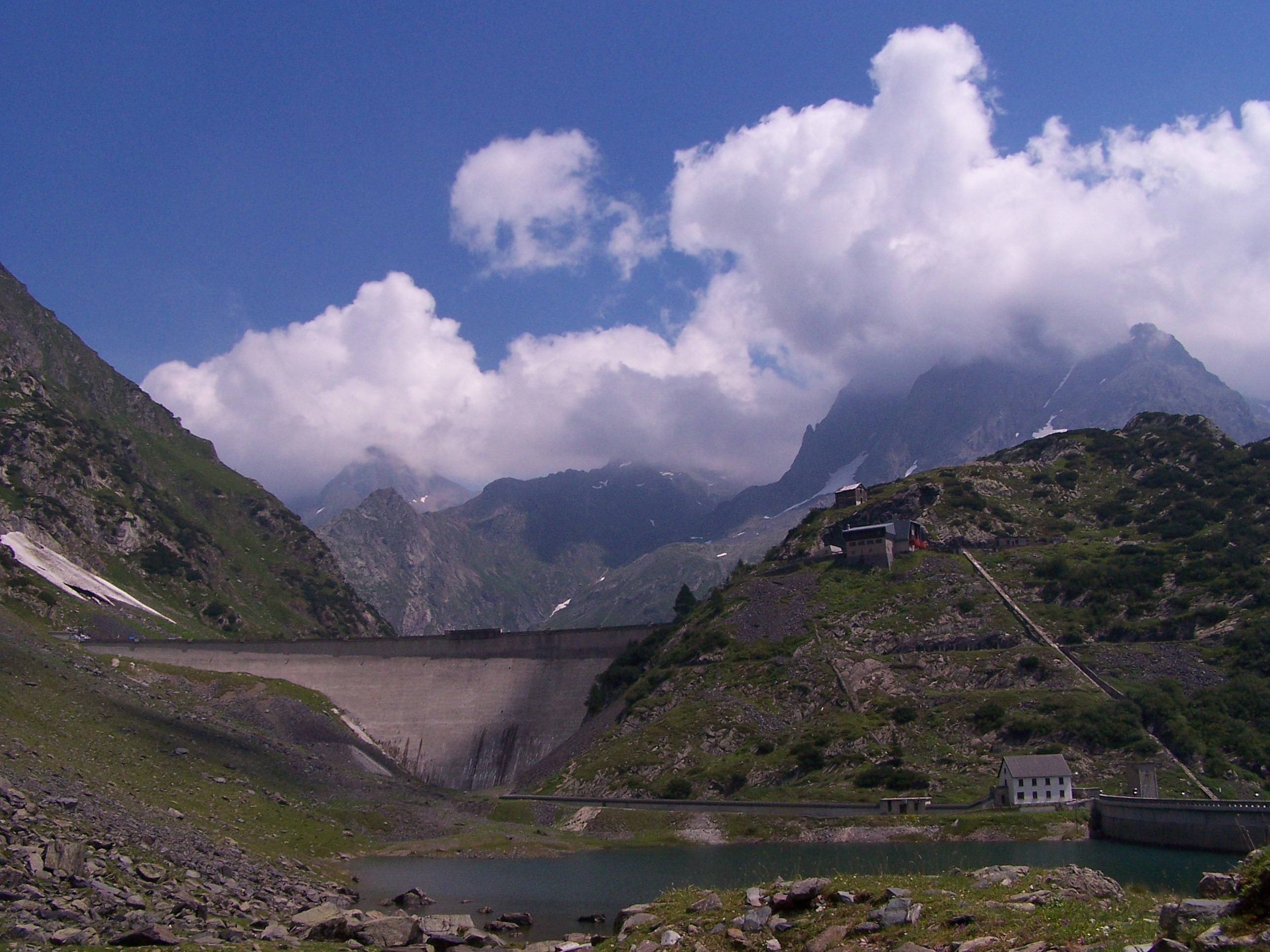
- Interactive map of Barbellino dam
- Country: Italy
- Location: Valbondione
- Coordinates: 46.06588°N 10.04323°E
- Purpose: Hydroelectric
- Construction began: 1927
- Owner: Enel Produzione
- Operator: Barbellino Hydroelectric Society

Dam and spillways
- Type of dam: Massive gravity dam
- Height: 69 m (226 ft)
- Length: 256 m (840 ft)
- Width (crest): 5 m (16 ft)
- Width (base): 54 m (177 ft)
- Dam volume: 122.42 acre⋅ft (151,000 m^{3})

=== The hydroelectric system ===
The Barbellino dam is only a part of the system of works built for the hydroelectric exploitation of Serio (river). The project started to be developed from 1917 by the Hydroelectric Society of Barbellino with the construction of some tanks that enabled to properly regulate the outcome of water. The system is composed by 5 works:

- Barbellino lake dam with a reservoir volume of 18 500 000 m³ of water (653321580 ft³)
- Valmorta lake dam with a reservoir volume of 130 000 m³ of water (4590908.4 ft³)
- Derivation drains in tunnel with a total length of 11.2 km
- A 1.2 km long final section of penstock
- "Dossi" 43 MW hydroelectric power station

The water contained into the artificial lake is discharged, through the dam, into the Valmorta reservoir of modulation (Valmorta lake). It is located a little below and it finally brings the water to the Dossi power station (Valbondione).

The hydroelectric exploitation of this large system enabled to produce a relevant quantity of "clean" electrical energy which means it is not created from oil or gas burning. The entire system produces more than 148 million of kWh, corresponding to the annual average consumption of 60 000 families. Enel has plans to augment the facility with a 4 MW / 8 MWh battery.

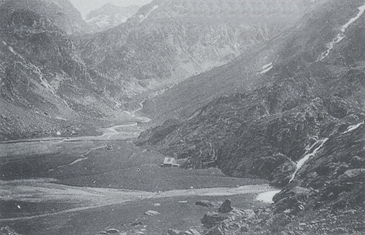
This picture was taken in 1962, you can see the Barbellino wide valley through which Serio streams flowed. Nowadays, Barbellino lake lies right there

=== The Barbellino reservoir ===
The creation of the Barbellino reservoir was possible thanks to the blockading of Serio river, after studying the geological characteristics of the area to fix both the dimension and shape.

Before the dam, the basin of Barbellino was an extended field with twisting streams of water which flowed through the wide valley called Barbellino Plain, until they joined the same stream water. This last one flowed into the Serio waterfalls, the highest of Italy (315 m, 1033.46 ft).

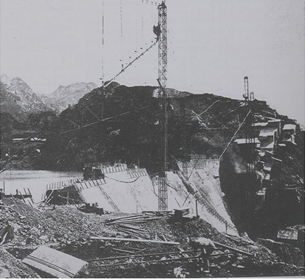
This picture was taken from the base of Peak Cappuccello (2714). In the foreground you can see Barbellino dam during its final phase of construction, while on the left, Barbellino lake

=== The creation of the dam ===
Between 1917 and 1923 the first dam of the system was realized: it was Valmorta dam which gave birth to Valmorta Lake, near Barbellino lake. Later, they thought about creating a second dam, the Barbellino dam, aiming to increase the amount of water available for the production of electrical energy. Works on the dam started in 1927 and finished in 1931.

The very beginning idea of creating a dam which could gather the water streams was meant to build a dam in the Pian del Campo, between Fiumenero town (Valbondione) and Peak Redorta. The problem was that, although the basin of Fiumenero was ample enough, the shape of the mountains where the dam was meant to be built was considered unsafe. For this reason, the construction of a dam in the Barbellino Plain was preferred.

The Barbellino blockading is a curved massive gravity dam made of concrete and its radius of curvature is 300 m long (984.25 ft). Its height is 69 m (226.38 ft), the highest part of the dam is at 1872 m above sea level and the maximum level of the basin can reach the height of 1870 m above sea level.

==== Lodging and other buildings ====
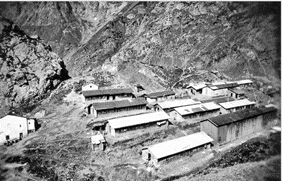
Huts built to guest workers, 1929

In order to make works possible, a sort of guesting village was established for 800 operators. There were 12 huts for workers and 2 huts for the chiefs placed in the area where now lies Antonio Curò Shelter. Works were coordinated from a designated position situated slightly below Barbellino Plain, near Valmorta Lake. The armoury of the building site was located in Maslana, a small mountain town with typical stone houses at 1.200 m. It contained explosives for the demolition of the rock necessary in order to insert the new frameworks of the dam in concrete. The explosives were carried by the operators' shoulders. Walking upwards for one hour and a half, they reached the building site of the dam. Those operators needed to be careful due to the high danger of the load. Unfortunately, something happened: many operators charged of transporting the explosives were women, among them one lady stumbled and fell with the box of dynamite which killed her and other 2 women. The tragedy happened on the 25th of 1919 and in their memory, a commemorative plaque was built along the path of Maslana.

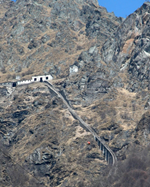
Cableway from Grumetti to Pinnacolo (Pic by Mario Marzani)

=== Technological plants ===
During 20s, four plants were built in order to transport the materials from the valley floor to the Barbellino wide valley. The first cableway started from Valbondione town and used to reach Antonio Curò shelter. It was 4,5 km long and had 1000 m (3280.84 ft) of difference in height, carrying a maximum of 10 ton of material. A second cableway was built from the valley floor Grumetti up to Mount Pinnacolo with 1,2 km length and 800 m (2624.67 ft) of difference in height. The heaviest materials were carried with this cableway since it could transport up to 3000 kg materials. Once reached the Pinnacolo, the materials were loaded up to a small train passing through a tunnel which led to Valmorta dam. The third cableway was built in parallel to the first one making the same way but carrying only cement materials. To conclude, another slope cableway was built to bring workers from the valley floor upwards. It worked till 70s, when a new funicular railway was built.

== How to reach the lake ==
To reach the lake there are two possible ways, in both cases starting from Valbondione. There's a path on the right side of Valbondione which lead to Antonio Curò Shelter. This path passes through a wood. Walking for several meters after the wood there is a sign which divides the way in two possible paths to reach the lake: the one on the left goes immediately upwards, it is shorter but more slope, while if continuing on the right path the walking will be much easiers.

== Bibliography ==
- Mario Marzani, Barbellino lake Dam, Comune di Valbondione (in Italian).
- Giovanni Simoncelli, Valbondione, 1998 (in Italian).
- Giovanni Maironi de Ponte, Geological analysis on Barbellino Mountain of Serio region, 1808 (in Italian).
