= Monte Costone =

Mountain in Italy

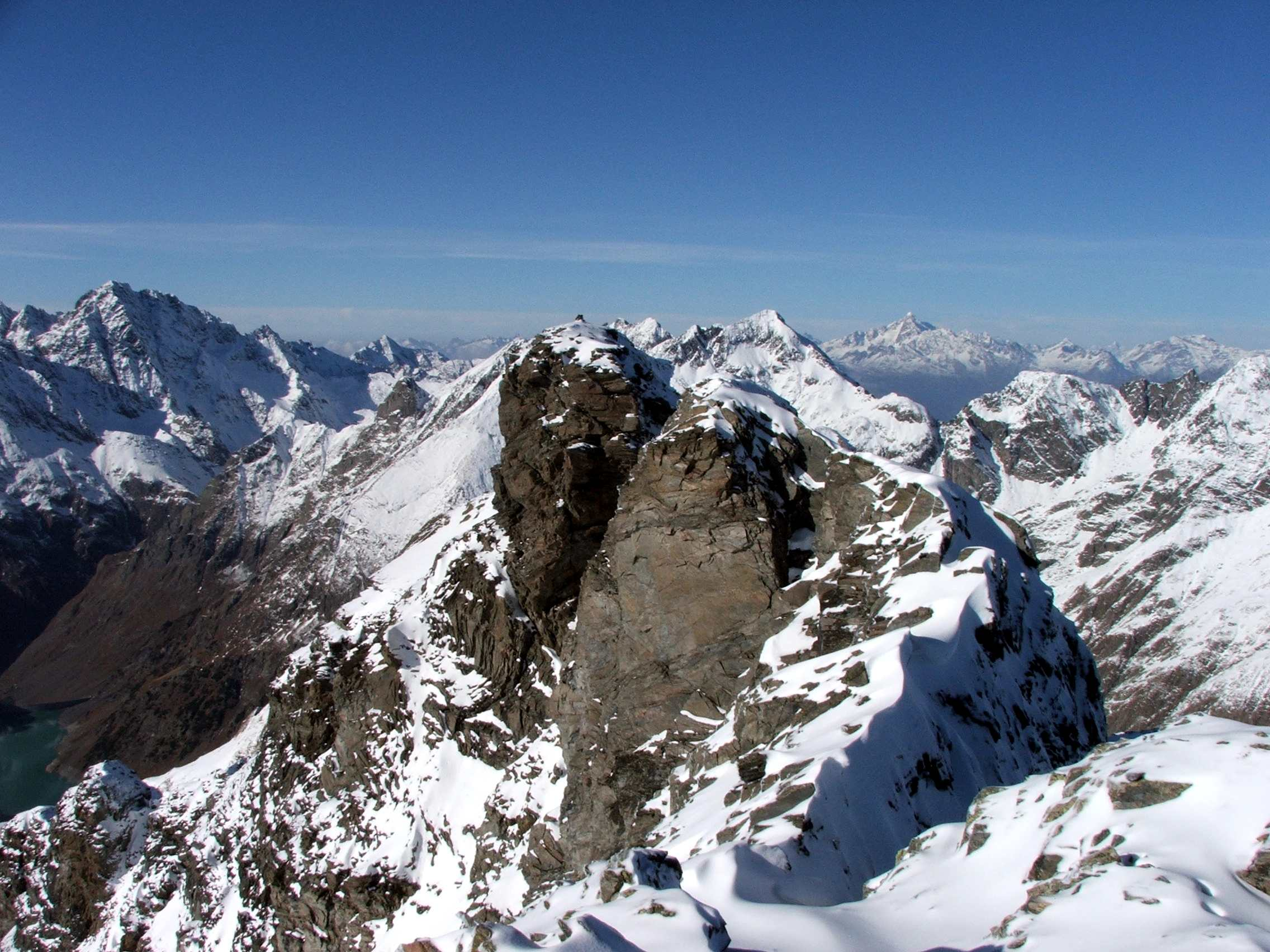
- A view of Monte Costone 's eastern summit

Highest point
- Elevation: 2,836 m (9,304 ft)
- Coordinates: 46°03′44″N 10°05′30″E

Geography
- Location within Italy
- Location: Lombardy, Italy
- Parent range: Bergamo Alps

Monte Costone is a mountain of Lombardy, Italy. It is located within the Bergamo Alps. Mountain hiking is a popular pastime, with Monte Costone a destination for experienced hikers.

== See also ==
- Alpine Brigade Orobica
- Swiss Alps
- List of national parks of the Alps
