= Monte Trobio =

Mountain in Italy

Coordinates: 46°03′35″N 10°05′35″E

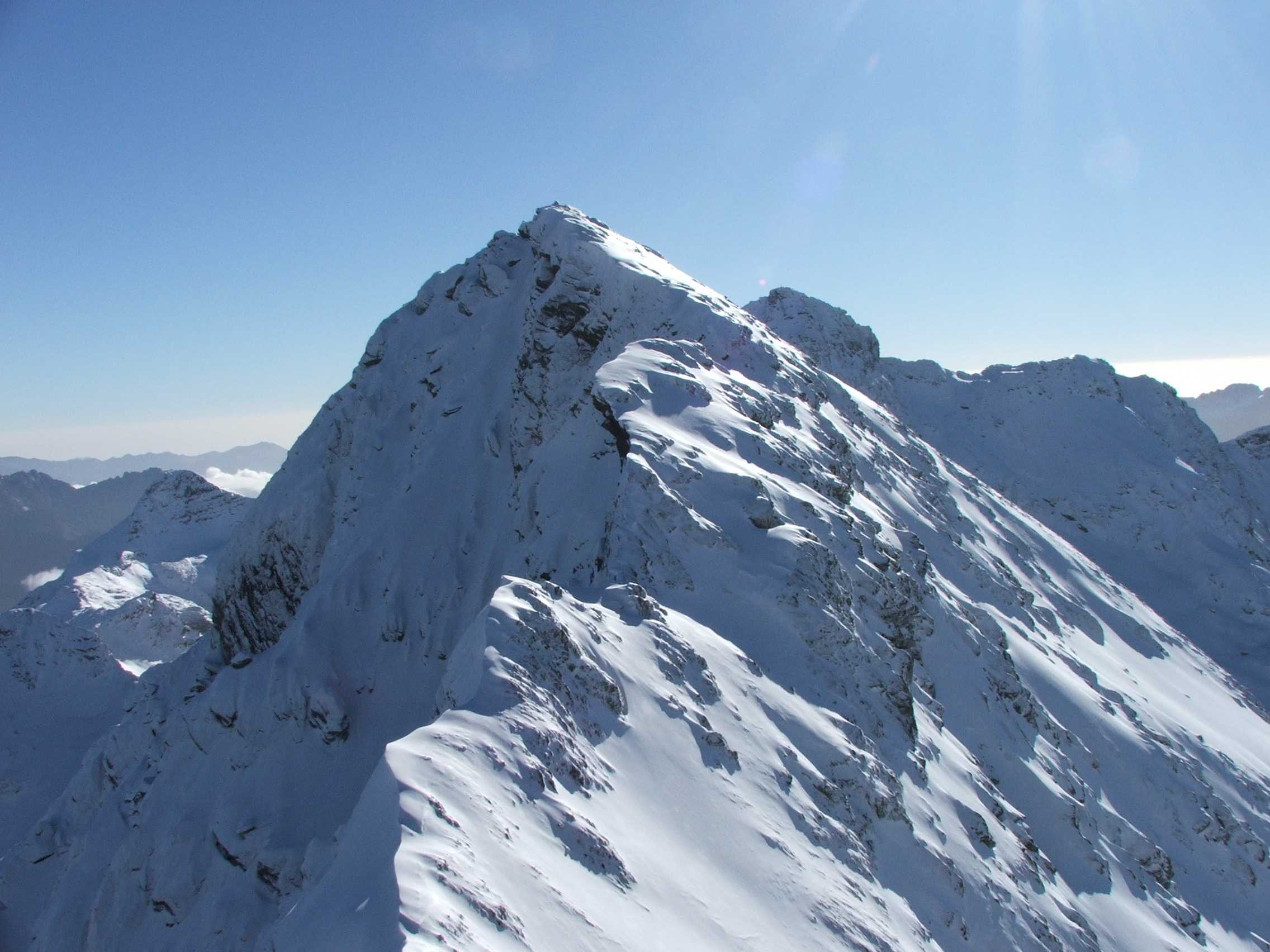

Highest point
- Elevation: 2,865 m (9,400 ft)

Geography
- Location: Lombardy, Italy
- Parent range: Bergamo Alps

Monte Trobio is a mountain of Lombardy, Italy. It is located within the Bergamo Alps.
