= Lago di Coca =

Lake in Lombardy, Italy

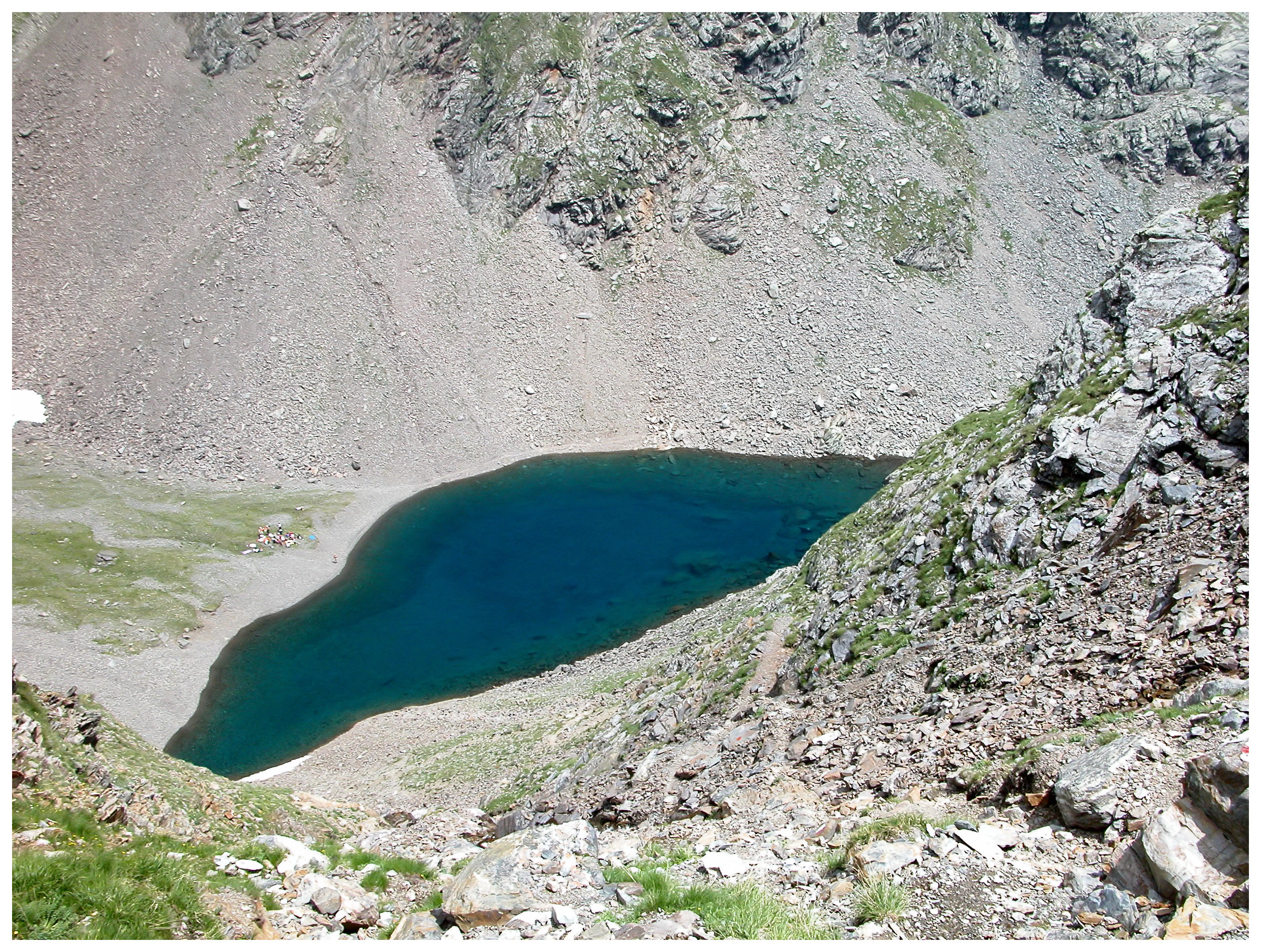

- Location within Lombardy
- Location: Province of Bergamo, Lombardy
- Coordinates: 46°03′47″N 9°59′59″E
- Basin countries: Italy
- Surface elevation: 2,108 m (6,916 ft)

Lago di Coca is a lake in the Province of Bergamo, Lombardy, Italy.
