= Lago del Barbellino Naturale =

Lake in Italy

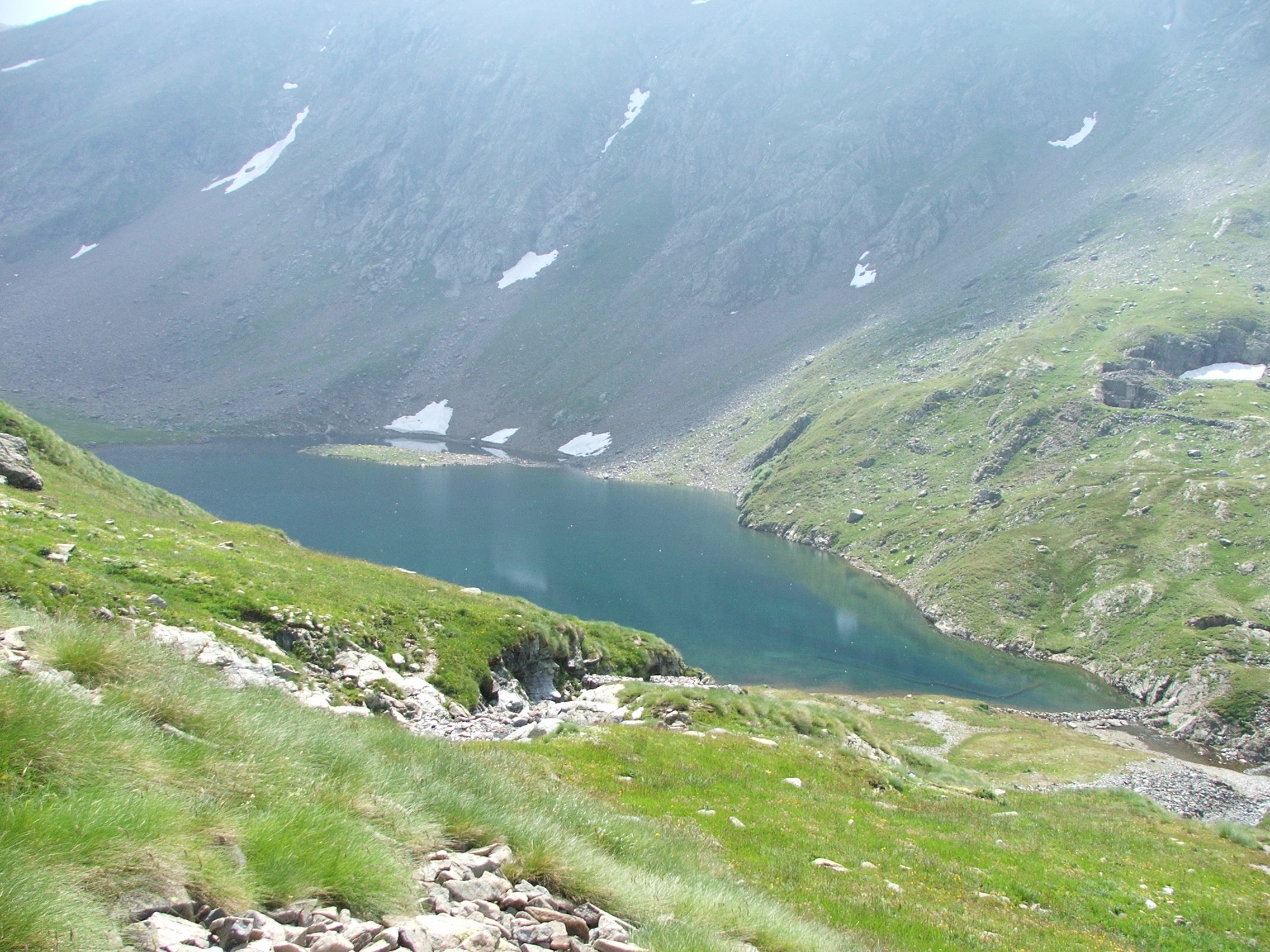

- Location within Italy
- Location: Province of Bergamo, Lombardy
- Coordinates: 46.078°N 10.084°E
- Basin countries: Italy
- Surface elevation: 2,128 m (6,982 ft)

Lago del Barbellino Naturale is a lake in the municipality of Valbondione, Lombardy, Italy.

The lake lies in a natural basin at the confluence of waters discharged from the melting snow, from the frequent rains and lakes along the lower valleys in the direction of Passo di Pila and Caronella Pass.
