= Climate of the Alps =

Life zones of the Alps

The climate of the Alps is the climate, or average weather conditions over a long period of time, of the exact middle Alpine region of Europe. As air rises from sea level to the upper regions of the atmosphere the temperature decreases. The effect of mountain topography on prevailing winds is to force warm air from the lower region into an upper zone where it expands in volume at the cost of a proportionate loss of heat, often accompanied by the precipitation of moisture in the form of snow, rain or hail.

== Climate as a function of elevation ==
Because air cools as it rises, the climate of the Alps is strongly dependent on the elevation. The Alps contain a number of different kinds of climate zones, by elevation. These zones can be described by the Köppen climate classification, and also correspond to the biotic zones of the Alps.

Up to approximately 1,050 metres (3,440 ft) of elevation, the climate is classified as oceanic or Cfb under the Köppen system. Like much of lowland northern Europe, the summers are mild and the winters are cool, but not cold. The climate is moderated by proximity to the Atlantic Ocean. The climate creates the colline biotic zone in the lowlands, which is characterized by the deciduous forest of the Western European broadleaf forests ecoregion.

Climate data for Buchs/Aarau (1991–2020), at 387 metres (1,270 ft), 47.38°N 8.08°E
Month	Jan	Feb	Mar	Apr	May	Jun	Jul	Aug	Sep	Oct	Nov	Dec	Year
Mean daily maximum °C (°F)	3.9 (39.0)	5.9 (42.6)	11.1 (52.0)	15.6 (60.1)	19.6 (67.3)	23.5 (74.3)	25.6 (78.1)	25.0 (77.0)	20.2 (68.4)	14.5 (58.1)	8.0 (46.4)	4.3 (39.7)	14.8 (58.6)
Daily mean °C (°F)	1.2 (34.2)	1.9 (35.4)	5.9 (42.6)	9.9 (49.8)	14.0 (57.2)	17.7 (63.9)	19.4 (66.9)	18.8 (65.8)	14.6 (58.3)	10.1 (50.2)	5.0 (41.0)	1.9 (35.4)	10.0 (50.0)
Mean daily minimum °C (°F)	−1.5 (29.3)	−1.7 (28.9)	1.2 (34.2)	4.3 (39.7)	8.5 (47.3)	12.1 (53.8)	13.6 (56.5)	13.5 (56.3)	9.8 (49.6)	6.5 (43.7)	2.3 (36.1)	−0.5 (31.1)	5.7 (42.3)
Average precipitation mm (inches)	63 (2.5)	53 (2.1)	61 (2.4)	63 (2.5)	98 (3.9)	92 (3.6)	98 (3.9)	98 (3.9)	70 (2.8)	72 (2.8)	69 (2.7)	81 (3.2)	920 (36.2)
Average snowfall cm (inches)	8 (3.1)	9 (3.5)	3 (1.2)	0. (0)	0 (0)	0 (0)	0 (0)	0 (0)	0 (0)	0 (0)	2 (0.8)	10 (3.9)	32 (13)
Average precipitation days (≥ 1.0 mm)	9.6	8.6	9.5	10.2	11.6	11.3	10.9	11.2	8.5	10.1	9.8	11.6	122.9
Average snowy days (≥ 1.0 cm)	2.8	2.5	1.1	0.1	0	0	0	0	0	0.1	0.7	2.4	9.7
Source: MeteoSwiss

Between approximately 1,050 to 1,390 metres (3,440 to 4,560 ft), the climate changes to either a humid continental climate (Dfb under the Köppen system), or a subpolar oceanic climate (Cfc), depending on location. As elevation increases, the winters become colder and the summers become shorter. A mixture of conifer and deciduous trees occupy this montane zone, leading to a change in ecoregion to Alps conifer and mixed forests.

Climate data for Scuol (1991–2020), 1,304 metres (4,278 ft), 46.79°N 10.28°E
Month	Jan	Feb	Mar	Apr	May	Jun	Jul	Aug	Sep	Oct	Nov	Dec	Year
Mean daily maximum °C (°F)	0.0 (32.0)	2.9 (37.2)	8.7 (47.7)	13.0 (55.4)	17.1 (62.8)	21.1 (70.0)	23.1 (73.6)	22.6 (72.7)	18.1 (64.6)	13.2 (55.8)	5.8 (42.4)	0.3 (32.5)	12.2 (54.0)
Daily mean °C (°F)	−4.3 (24.3)	−2.7 (27.1)	1.8 (35.2)	6.0 (42.8)	10.3 (50.5)	13.8 (56.8)	15.5 (59.9)	15.0 (59.0)	11.0 (51.8)	6.5 (43.7)	0.9 (33.6)	−3.3 (26.1)	5.9 (42.6)
Mean daily minimum °C (°F)	−8 (18)	−7.3 (18.9)	−3.5 (25.7)	0.1 (32.2)	4.3 (39.7)	7.6 (45.7)	9.3 (48.7)	9.3 (48.7)	5.6 (42.1)	1.8 (35.2)	−2.8 (27.0)	−6.7 (19.9)	0.8 (33.4)
Average precipitation mm (inches)	38 (1.5)	27 (1.1)	34 (1.3)	35 (1.4)	53 (2.1)	80 (3.1)	88 (3.5)	109 (4.3)	65 (2.6)	69 (2.7)	63 (2.5)	47 (1.9)	708 (27.9)
Average snowfall cm (inches)	51 (20)	39 (15)	20 (7.9)	7 (2.8)	1 (0.4)	0 (0)	0 (0)	0 (0)	0 (0)	6 (2.4)	24 (9.4)	49 (19)	197 (78)
Average precipitation days (≥ 1.0 mm)	5.9	4.9	5.2	6.0	9.1	10.6	11.0	11.8	8.0	8.0	7.2	6.8	94.5
Average snowy days (≥ 1.0 cm)	7.8	6.3	4.0	1.8	0.2	0	0	0	0	0.6	4.3	7.4	32.4
Source: MeteoSwiss

Between approximately 1,390 to 1,880 metres (4,560 to 6,170 ft), the climate becomes subarctic (Dfc under the Köppen system), with even shorter summers. The shorter growing season shifts the forest to be purely coniferous.

Climate data for Samedan (1991–2020), 1,709 metres (5,607 ft), 46.53°N 9.88°E
Month	Jan	Feb	Mar	Apr	May	Jun	Jul	Aug	Sep	Oct	Nov	Dec	Year
Mean daily maximum °C (°F)	−1.3 (29.7)	0.5 (32.9)	4.0 (39.2)	7.9 (46.2)	12.9 (55.2)	17.0 (62.6)	19.3 (66.7)	18.8 (65.8)	14.6 (58.3)	10.5 (50.9)	4.1 (39.4)	−0.7 (30.7)	9.0 (48.2)
Daily mean °C (°F)	−8.4 (16.9)	−7.1 (19.2)	−2.4 (27.7)	1.9 (35.4)	6.7 (44.1)	10.5 (50.9)	12.3 (54.1)	11.8 (53.2)	7.9 (46.2)	3.6 (38.5)	−2.1 (28.2)	−7 (19)	2.3 (36.1)
Mean daily minimum °C (°F)	−15.8 (3.6)	−15.6 (3.9)	−9.6 (14.7)	−4.3 (24.3)	0.1 (32.2)	3.2 (37.8)	4.7 (40.5)	4.7 (40.5)	1.3 (34.3)	−2.6 (27.3)	−7.8 (18.0)	−13.4 (7.9)	−4.6 (23.7)
Average precipitation mm (inches)	29 (1.1)	19 (0.7)	24 (0.9)	37 (1.5)	67 (2.6)	91 (3.6)	87 (3.4)	100 (3.9)	73 (2.9)	77 (3.0)	70 (2.8)	37 (1.5)	710 (28.0)
Average snowfall cm (inches)	51 (20)	42 (17)	30 (12)	21 (8.3)	4 (1.6)	0 (0)	0 (0)	0 (0)	2 (0.8)	12 (4.7)	40 (16)	52 (20)	254 (100)
Average precipitation days (≥ 1.0 mm)	5.2	4.2	4.3	6.0	9.2	11.0	10.6	11.0	8.0	8.1	7.9	6.1	91.6
Average snowy days (≥ 1.0 cm)	8.8	8.0	6.9	5.1	1.1	0.2	0.1	0.0	0.5	2.6	6.7	9.5	49.5
Source: MeteoSwiss

At about 1,880 metres (6,170 ft), the climate becomes too cold to support trees, and is classified as an alpine climate (ET under the Köppen system). The summers become cool and only grasses and low plants are adapted to grow. This alpine climate extends to approximately 3,250 metres (10,660 ft).

Climate data for Weissfluhjoch (1991–2020), 2,690 metres (8,830 ft), 46.833°N 9.806°E
Month	Jan	Feb	Mar	Apr	May	Jun	Jul	Aug	Sep	Oct	Nov	Dec	Year
Mean daily maximum °C (°F)	−5.3 (22.5)	−5.9 (21.4)	−4.1 (24.6)	−1.5 (29.3)	2.7 (36.9)	7.3 (45.1)	10.2 (50.4)	10.6 (51.1)	6.5 (43.7)	3.4 (38.1)	−1.7 (28.9)	−4.3 (24.3)	1.5 (34.7)
Daily mean °C (°F)	−7.8 (18.0)	−8.5 (16.7)	−6.6 (20.1)	−4 (25)	0.1 (32.2)	3.9 (39.0)	6.2 (43.2)	6.6 (43.9)	3.0 (37.4)	0.3 (32.5)	−4.2 (24.4)	−6.9 (19.6)	−1.5 (29.3)
Mean daily minimum °C (°F)	−10.4 (13.3)	−11.2 (11.8)	−9.3 (15.3)	−6.5 (20.3)	−2.3 (27.9)	1.3 (34.3)	3.2 (37.8)	3.7 (38.7)	0.5 (32.9)	−2.2 (28.0)	−6.7 (19.9)	−9.6 (14.7)	−4.1 (24.6)
Average precipitation mm (inches)	108 (4.3)	80 (3.1)	96 (3.8)	79 (3.1)	116 (4.6)	166 (6.5)	181 (7.1)	198 (7.8)	123 (4.8)	97 (3.8)	92 (3.6)	103 (4.1)	1,439 (56.7)
Average snowfall cm (inches)	131 (52)	117 (46)	123 (48)	91 (36)	63 (25)	36 (14)	14 (5.5)	12 (4.7)	35 (14)	63 (25)	118 (46)	136 (54)	939 (370)
Average precipitation days (≥ 1.0 mm)	10.5	9.6	12.0	11.6	14.2	15.4	15.2	15.0	12.1	10.0	10.9	11.0	147.5
Average snowy days (≥ 1.0 cm)	12.9	11.8	14.3	12.7	10.	5.5	2.5	2.0	5.8	8.1	12.9	14.3	113
Source: MeteoSwiss

Above approximately 3,250 metres (10,660 ft), the climate transitions to an ice cap climate, where the mean temperature from 1976-2000 was always below 0 °C (32 °F). At these altitudes, no plants can grow and the ground is either rock or ice. At 3571m and from 1991 through 2020, Jungfraujoch had an ET climate, with an August mean temperature of 0.6 °C (33 °F). Glaciers, such as the Aletsch Glacier, still surround Jungfrau, but are starting to melt due to climate change.

Climate data for Jungfraujoch, elevation: 3,571 m (11,716 ft), 1991–2020 normals, extremes 1973–present, 46.548°N 7.987°E
Month	Jan	Feb	Mar	Apr	May	Jun	Jul	Aug	Sep	Oct	Nov	Dec	Year
Record high °C (°F)	4.2 (39.6)	2.9 (37.2)	8.2 (46.8)	4.9 (40.8)	10.0 (50.0)	13.1 (55.6)	14.3 (57.7)	12.8 (55.0)	11.6 (52.9)	10.0 (50.0)	4.5 (40.1)	7.1 (44.8)	14.3 (57.7)
Mean daily maximum °C (°F)	−9.5 (14.9)	−10.2 (13.6)	−8.6 (16.5)	−6.3 (20.7)	−2.1 (28.2)	1.7 (35.1)	3.4 (38.1)	3.5 (38.3)	0.5 (32.9)	−2.2 (28.0)	−6.5 (20.3)	−8.7 (16.3)	−3.8 (25.2)
Daily mean °C (°F)	−12.5 (9.5)	−13.3 (8.1)	−11.6 (11.1)	−9.4 (15.1)	−5.2 (22.6)	−1.5 (29.3)	0.4 (32.7)	0.6 (33.1)	−2.4 (27.7)	−4.9 (23.2)	−9.2 (15.4)	−11.7 (10.9)	−6.7 (19.9)
Mean daily minimum °C (°F)	−15.5 (4.1)	−16.3 (2.7)	−14.4 (6.1)	−12.0 (10.4)	−7.8 (18.0)	−4.0 (24.8)	−2.1 (28.2)	−1.7 (28.9)	−4.7 (23.5)	−7.4 (18.7)	−11.8 (10.8)	−14.5 (5.9)	−9.4 (15.1)
Record low °C (°F)	−34.2 (−29.6)	−35.4 (−31.7)	−28.9 (−20.0)	−25.2 (−13.4)	−22.0 (−7.6)	−16.4 (2.5)	−14.0 (6.8)	−13.0 (8.6)	−16.0 (3.2)	−21.7 (−7.1)	−30.0 (−22.0)	−30.7 (−23.3)	−35.4 (−31.7)
Average relative humidity (%)	63	65	67	72	78	77	76	74	71	66	68	65	70
Mean monthly sunshine hours	117	122	161	160	152	170	181	183	175	145	106	101	1,773
Percentage possible sunshine	49	51	48	44	37	40	43	48	50	53	44	45	45
Source 1: MeteoSwiss
Source 2: Infoclimat.fr (extremes)
