= Lago della Malgina =

Lake in the Bergamo Alps, Italy

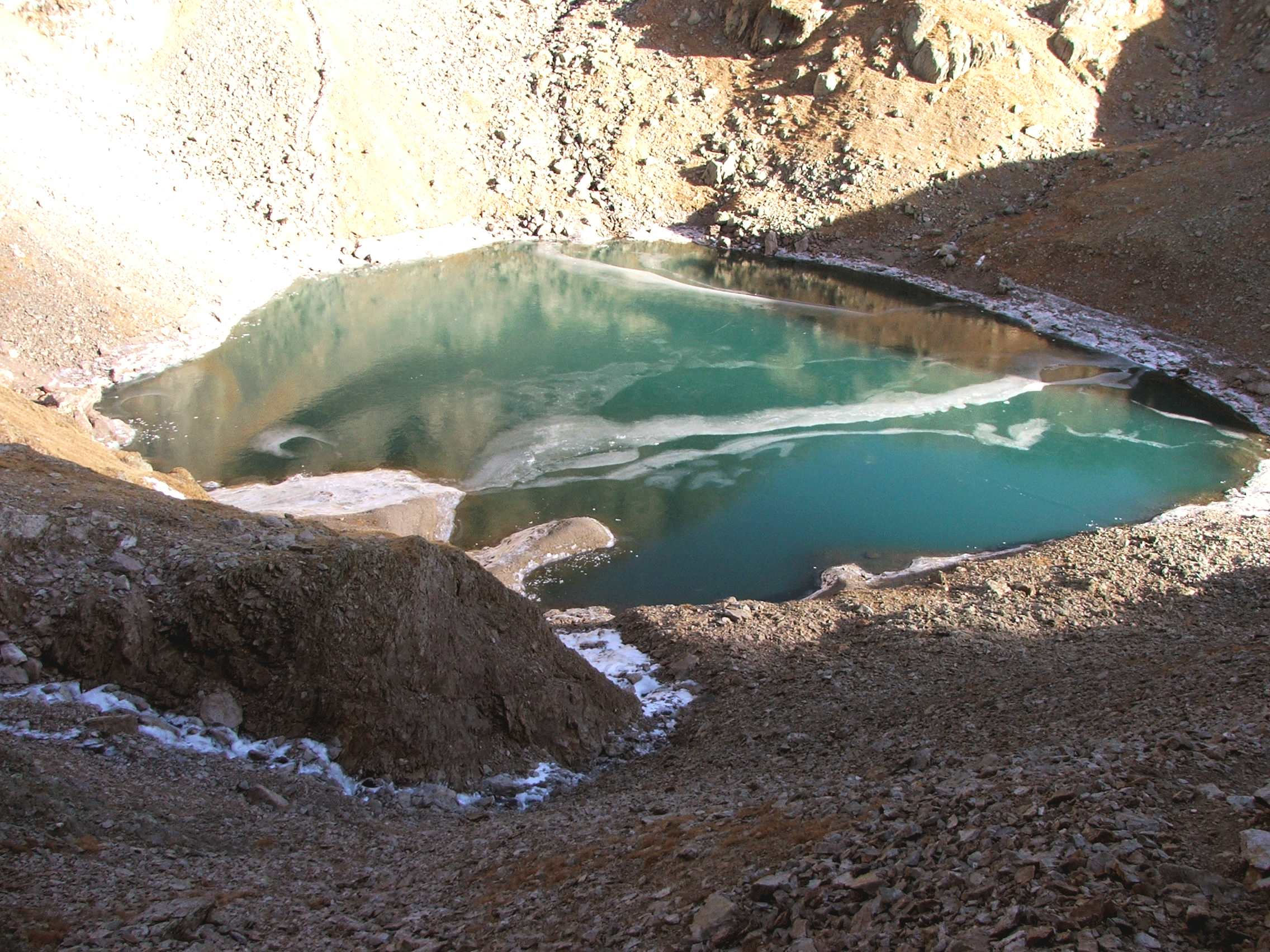

- Location within Lombardy
- Location: Province of Bergamo, Lombardy
- Coordinates: 46°04′58″N 10°03′34″E
- Basin countries: Italy
- Surface elevation: 2,339 m (7,674 ft)

Lago della Malgina is a lake in the Province of Bergamo, Lombardy, Italy.
