= List of national parks in the Alps =

This is a list of national parks in the Alps.

== Switzerland ==
- Swiss National Park (1914)

== Italy ==
- Gran Paradiso National Park (1922, coupled with the Vanoise)
- Stelvio National Park (1935)
- Val Grande National Park (1992)
- Dolomiti Bellunesi National Park (1990)

== Germany ==
- Berchtesgaden National Park (1978)

== Austria ==
- Hohe Tauern National Park (Nationalpark Hohe Tauern) (1981)
- Limestone Alps National Park (Nationalpark Kalkalpen) (1997)
- Gesäuse National Park (2002)

== Slovenia ==
- Triglav National Park (1924, in 1961 that zone became a national park)

== France ==
- Écrins National Park (1973)
- Vanoise National Park (1963)
- Mercantour National Park (1979)
