= Monte Torena =

Mountain in Italy

Coordinates: 46°05′18″N 10°06′11″E

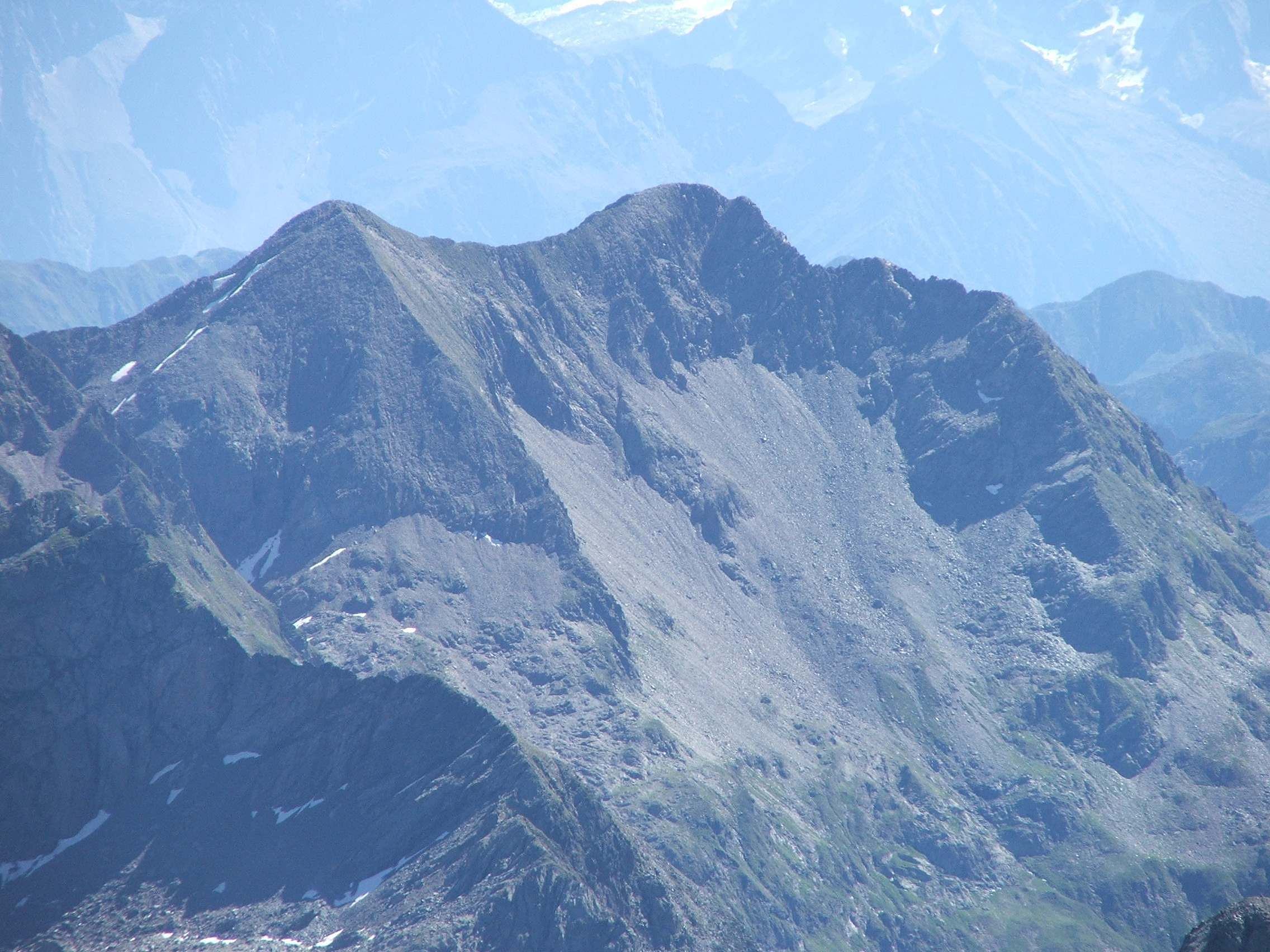

Highest point
- Elevation: 2,911 m (9,551 ft)

Geography
- Location: Lombardy, Italy
- Parent range: Bergamo Alps

Monte Torena is a mountain in Lombardy, Italy, located within the Bergamo Alps. It has been a popular but challenging destination for mountain hiking for 100 years.

On its south slopes, there's the source of the Serio river.
