= Gail (river) =

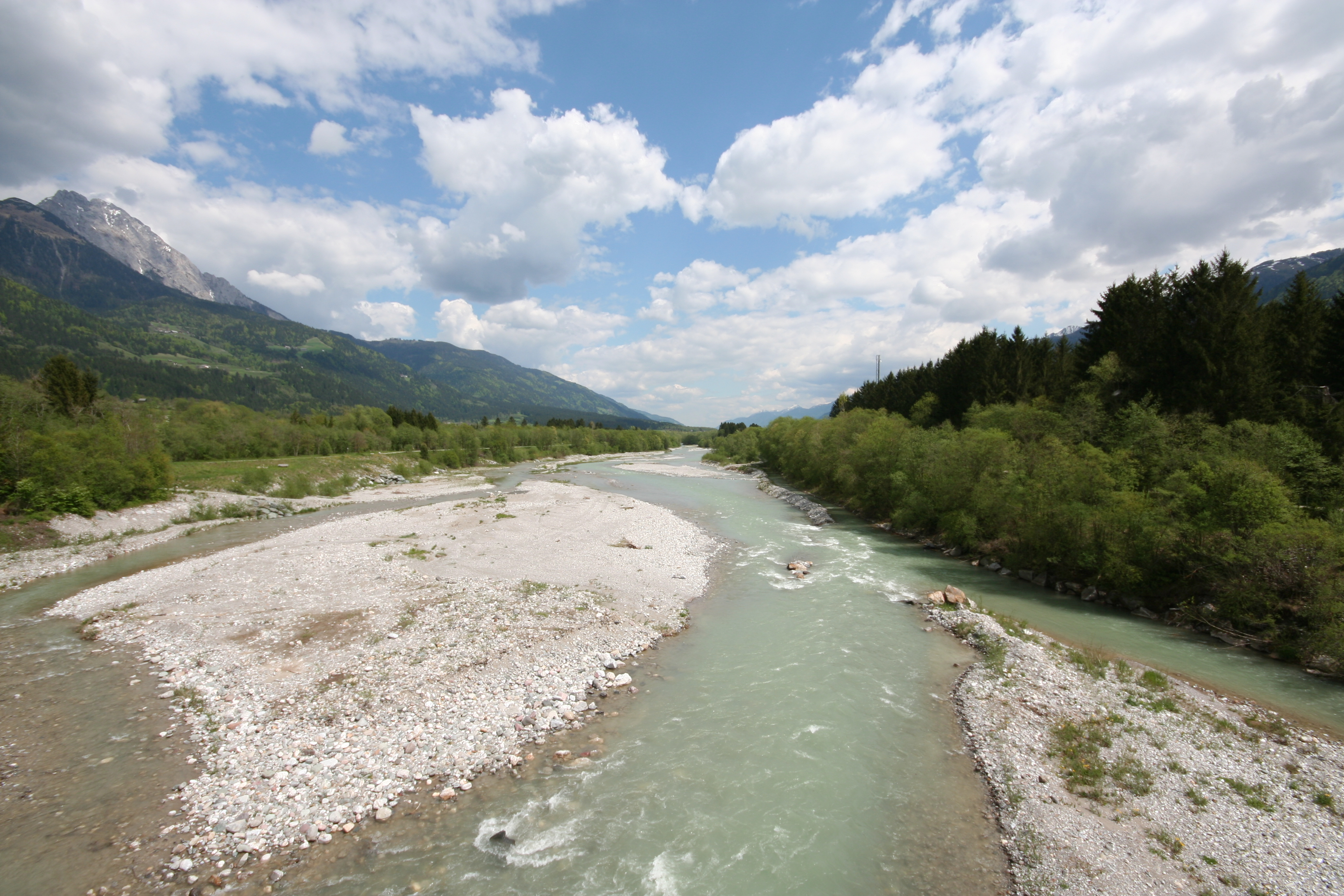
- Gail River near Dellach

Location
- Country: Austria

Physical characteristics
- Source
  - location: Obertilliach, East Tyrol
- Mouth
  - location: Drava River near Villach
  - coordinates: 46°36′23″N 13°53′14″E
- Length: 121.9 km (75.7 mi)
- Basin size: 1,413.9 km^{2} (545.9 sq mi)
- Discharge
  - average: 45.08 m^{3} (1,592 cu ft)

Basin features
- Progression: Drava→ Danube→ Black Sea

Gail (Slovene: Zilja, Italian: Zeglia) is the name of a river in southern Austria, the largest right tributary of the Drava. Its drainage basin is 1,413.9 km^{2} (545.9 sq mi).

== Etymology ==
The name Gail developed from Old High German Gîla, in turn from the form *Gīla (which was also the source of the Slovene name Zilja). It is likely that the name is of substrate origin, predating the Roman presence in the area. The name is believed to derive from the pre-Romance word *gai̯li̯a (from the Indo-European root *gʰoi̯lo-), meaning 'foaming (water), powerful'. The river is documented as Gila in a 1090 deed. The Slovene name Zilja is also commonly cited because the lower Gail Valley is a traditional settlement area of the Carinthian Slovenes and a language region of the distinct Gail Valley dialect.

== Course ==
The river source is located east of the Kartitsch Saddle and the Puster Valley in the Tyrolean municipality of Obertilliach. It flows from west to east through the Southern Limestone Alps, between the Gailtal Alps in the north and the Carnic Alps in the south. The river reaches the state of Carinthia in Lesachtal and from Kötschach-Mauthen runs down the broader Gail Valley (German: Gailtal) with its steep slopes, parallel to the borders with Italy and Slovenia. Beyond its confluence with the Slizza (Gailitz) tributary in Arnoldstein, the Gail joins the Drava River beneath the western Karawanks mountain range near the village of Maria Gail, part of the city of Villach.

Upper Gailtal possesses two spectacularly large conoidal debris fans - the Outsize Fan at Obertilliach, 200 m high and 1.5 km in radius, blocking the floor, and the alpine megafan at Gundersheim, 220 m high and 2 km in radius.

Following the 1348 Friuli earthquake which destroyed Villach, the river's course upstream was dammed by a major landslide, causing extensive flooding; on breaching of the dam, flooding caused further devastation around Villach. The rockslide path (Schütt) along a length of 10 km (6.2 mi) is still discernible on the steep slopes of Mt. Dobratsch north of Arnoldstein. With a volume of 30 million cubic metres, this Junge Schutt is dwarfed by the 300 million cubic metres of the postglacial Alte Schutt just up-river.Eisbacher, G. H. & Clague, J. J. 1984. Destructive mass movements in high mountains: hazard and manage- ment. Geological Survey of Canada, Professional Paper, 84-16

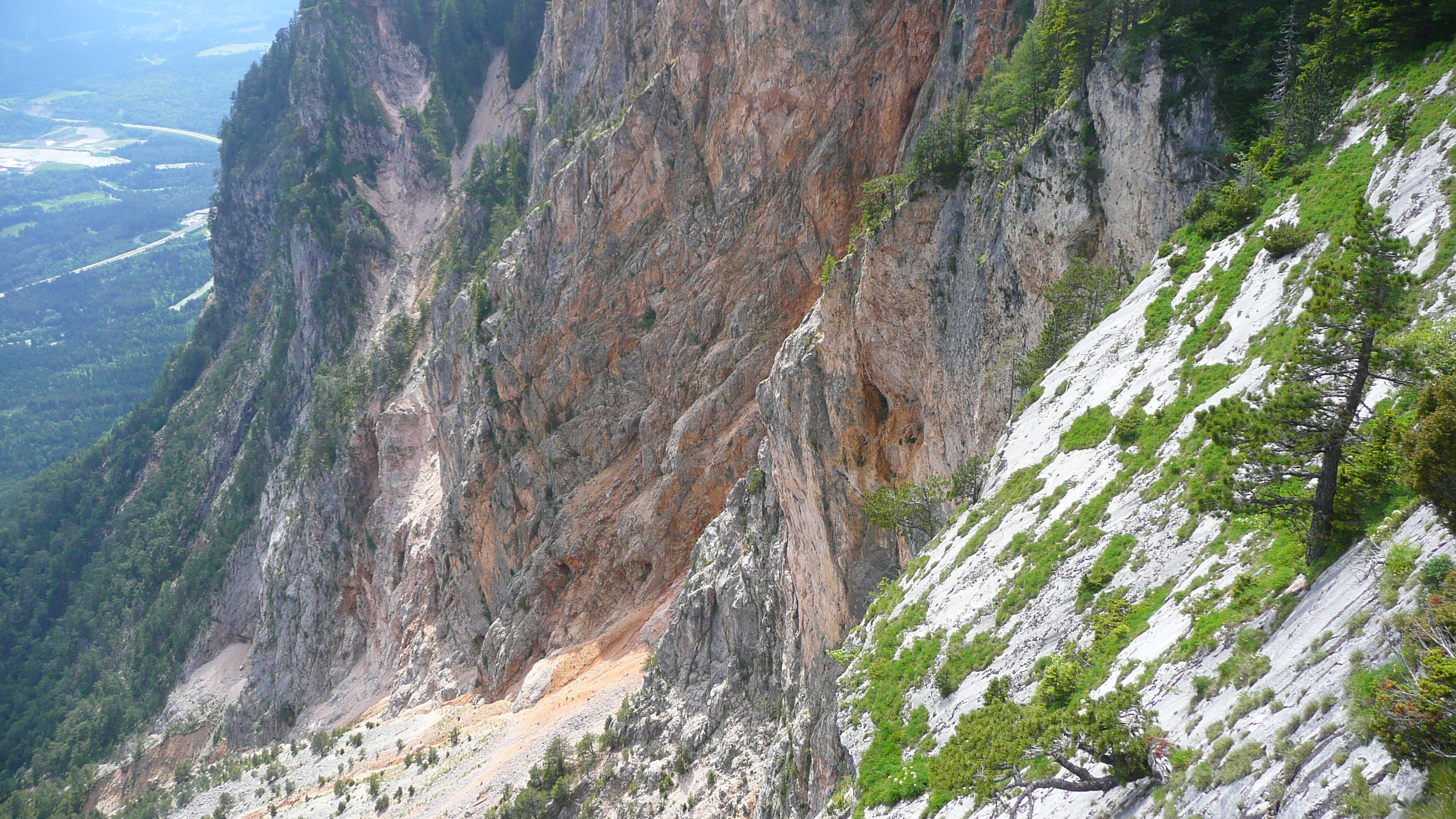
Dobratsch crag above the Gail Valley

While the upper river course is largely preserved in its natural condition, a habitat for shorebirds like the common sandpiper, the white-throated dipper and the grey wagtail, large parts of the lower Gail have been gradually regulated since the 1870s. In recent times, some sections have been renaturated. Today the trout zone reaches up to Hermagor with 17 species, among them common barbel, the common nase, and the rare souffia.

== Tributaries ==
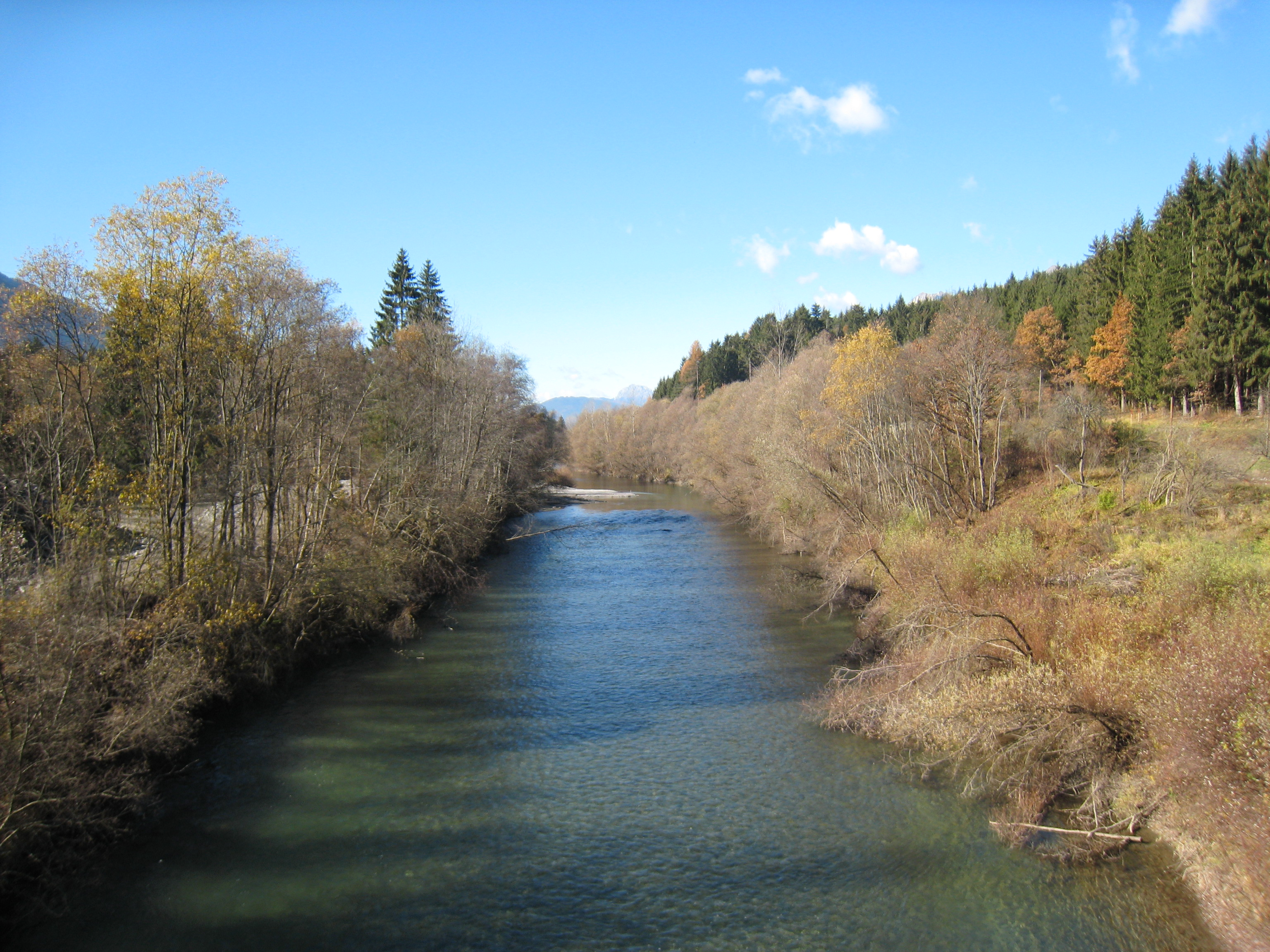
River course near Sankt Stefan

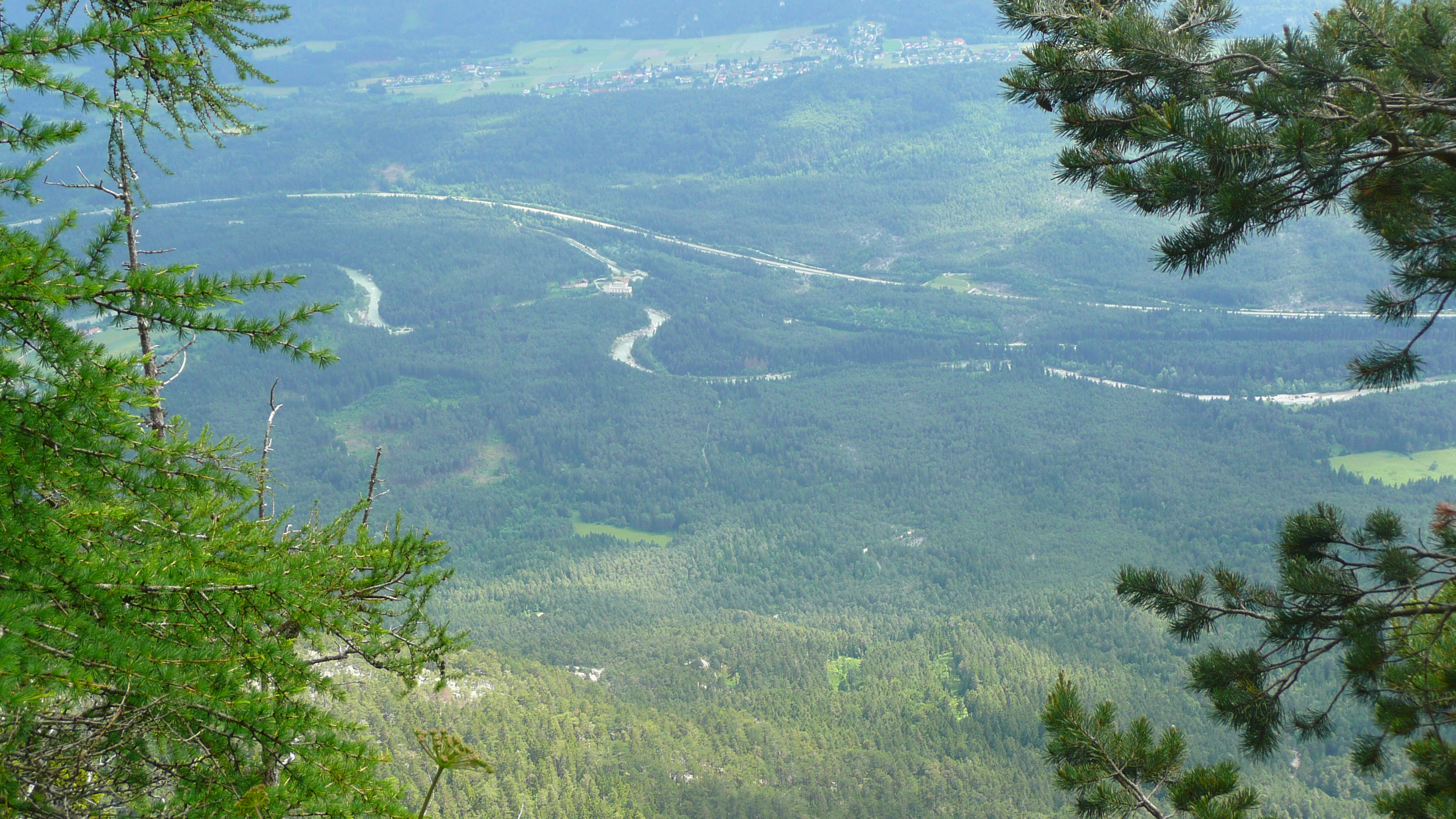
Lower Gail (with Süd Autobahn) near Villach

- Gössering (left)
- Slizza (right)

== Municipalities ==
- Tyrol (East Tyrol)
  - Obertilliach
  - Untertilliach
- Carinthia
  - Lesachtal
  - Kötschach-Mauthen
  - Dellach
  - Kirchbach
  - Hermagor
  - Sankt Stefan
  - Nötsch
  - Feistritz
  - Hohenthurn
  - Arnoldstein
  - Villach
