= Obertilliach =

- Municipality
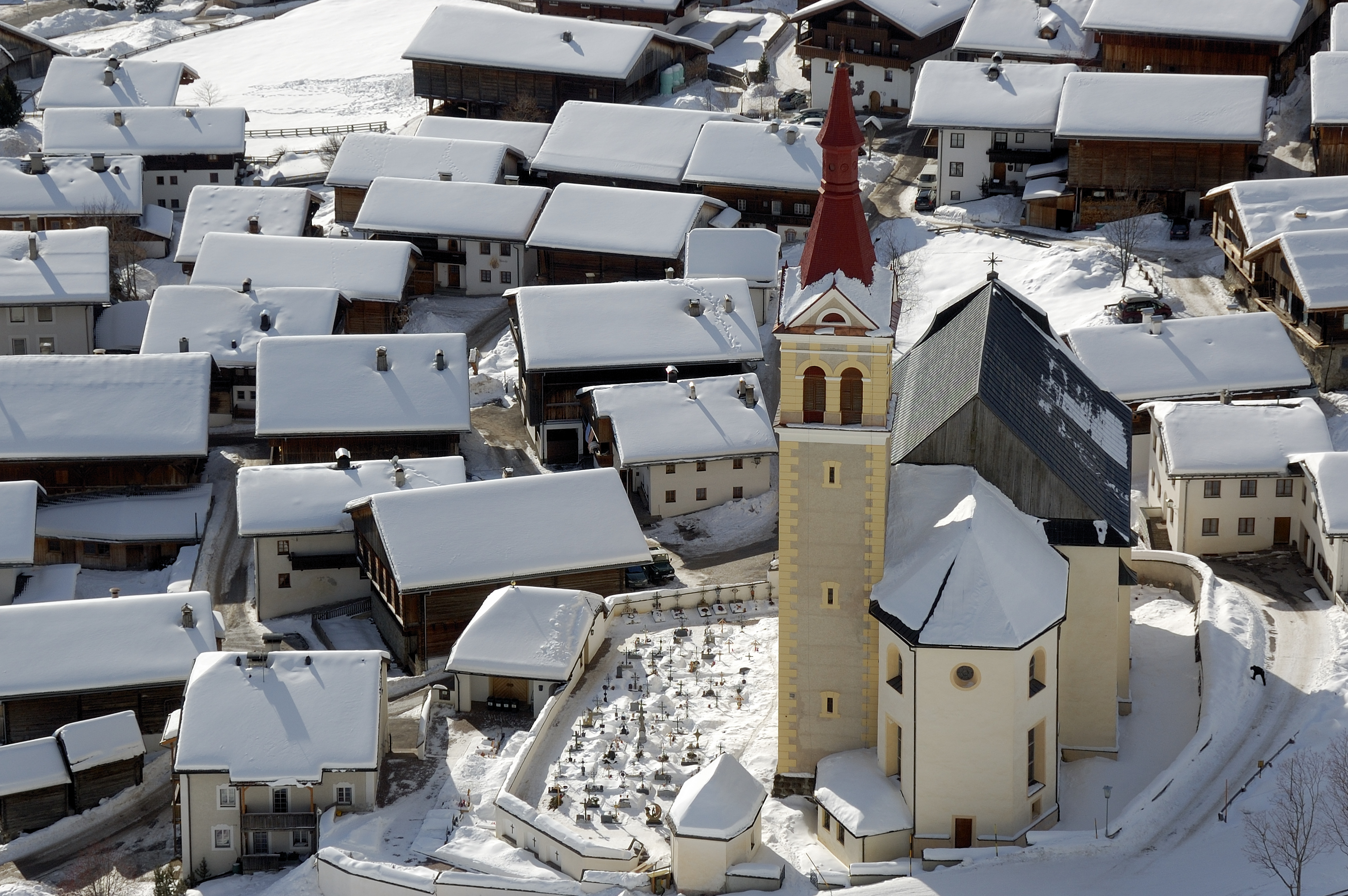
- St Ulrich parish church

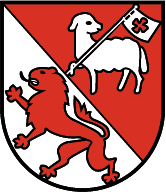
- Coat of arms

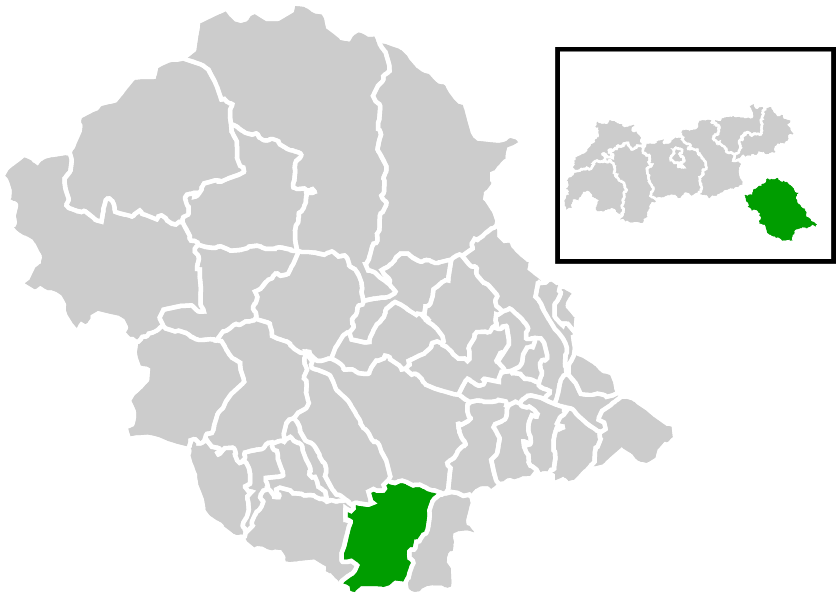
- Location within Lienz district

- Location within Austria
- Coordinates: 46°42′31″N 12°36′58″E
- Country: Austria
- State: Tyrol
- District: Lienz

Government
  - Mayor: Matthias Scherer (ÖVP)

Area
  - Total: 65.05 km^{2} (25.12 sq mi)
- Elevation: 1,450 m (4,760 ft)

Population (2018-01-01)
  - Total: 666
  - Density: 10.2/km^{2} (26.5/sq mi)
- Time zone: UTC+1 (CET)
  - Summer (DST): UTC+2 (CEST)
- Postal code: 9942
- Area code: 04847
- Vehicle registration: LZ
- Website: www.obertilliach.gv.at

Obertilliach is a municipality in the district of Lienz, in the Austrian state of Tyrol.

== Geography ==
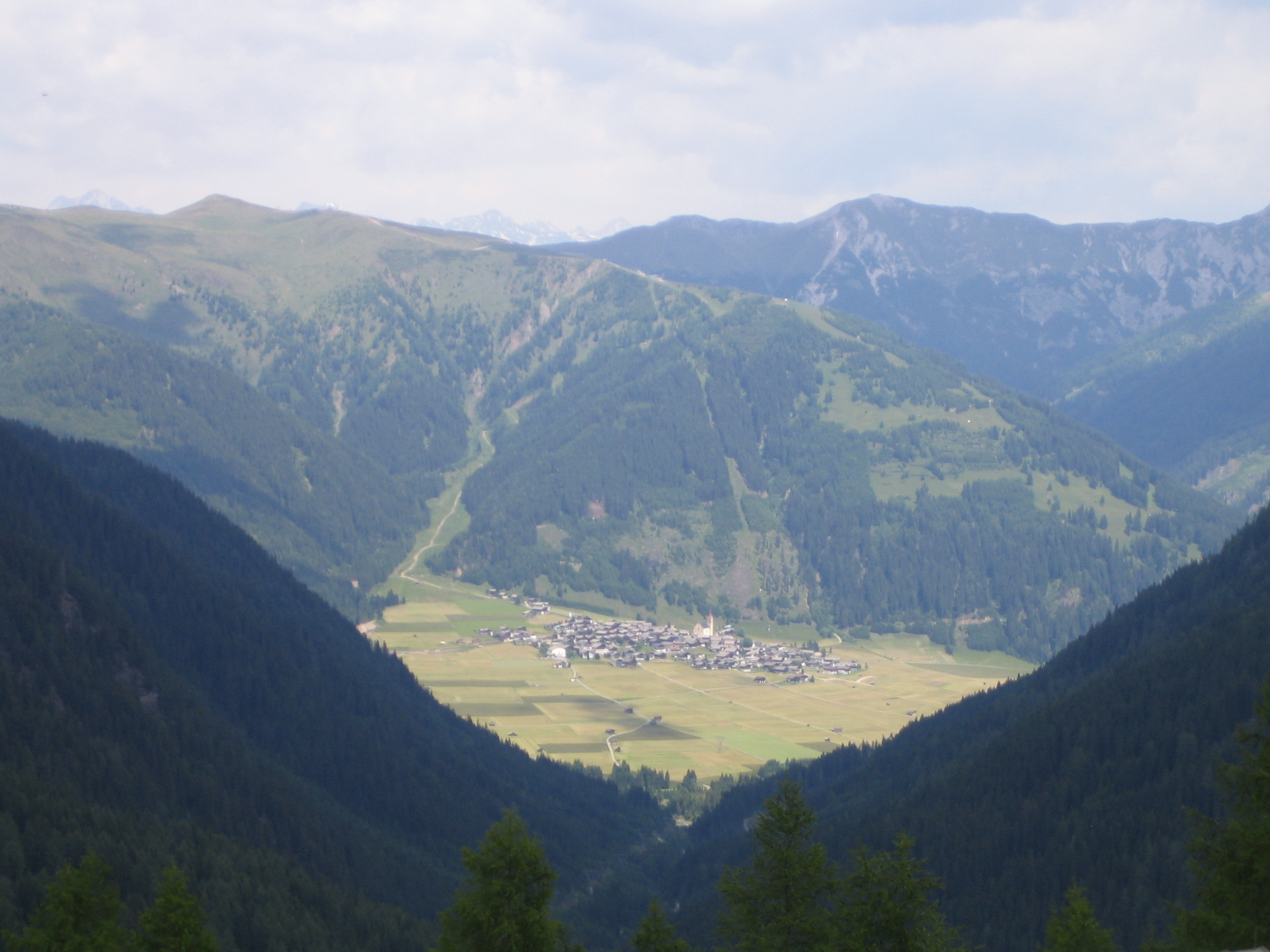
Tilliach Valley, view from Carnic Alps

It is located in East Tyrol, in a high valley of the upper Gail River east of the Kartitsch Saddle known as Lesachtal, between the Gailtal Alps (Lienz Dolomites) in the north and the Carnic Alps in the south. Down the valley to the east lies the neighbouring municipality of Untertilliach, the mountain crest in the south marks the border with the Venetian Cadore region in Italy.

The municipal area comprises Obertilliach proper around the St Ulrich parish church and the small villages of Bergen, Leiten, and Rodarm. Compared to the nearby Puster Valley west of the Kartitsch Saddle, a more Alpine climate prevails in the high up region with harsh winters but plenty of sunshine. Originally an agricultural area, Obertilliach today largely depends on tourism and is a popular destination for biathletes and cross-country skiers as well as for hikers, mountaineers and paragliders in summer.

=== Municipal division ===
Obertilliach can be divided into 4 localities (Ortschaften) (Population as of 2025):

- Bergen (117)
- Leiten (36)
- Obertilliach (458)
- Rodarm (58)

== History ==
Bavarian settlement of the area is first mentioned in the late 11th century. In early medieval times, the slopes to the south were used by Italian peasants from Cadore to pasture their livestock. In the eighth century, Duke Tassilo III of Bavaria ceded the upper Gail Valley to the Benedictine monks of Innichen Abbey. The Tilliach area was acquired by the Prince-bishops of Brixen in about 1075.

From about 1100, the Bavarian House of Gorizia (Görz) residing at Lienz, nominally vassals of the Brixen bishops, consolidated their rule over the Tilliach region, contested by both the Prince-bishops of Salzburg and the Sponheim dukes of Carinthia in the east. When the last of the Counts of Gorizia died in 1500, their estates around Lienz fell to the Habsburg emperor Maximilian I and were incorporated into the County of Tyrol.

Longtime quarrels with the Republic of Venice were settled when the border with the Venetian Domini di Terraferma was established along the Carnic mountain crest. The Prince-Bishops of Brixen insisted upon their feudal rights in the Tilliach valley until the secularisation of the diocese in 1803; however, they were not able to effectively control the remote region. The present-day municipality was established in 1852.

== Population ==
Historical population
Year	Pop.	±%
1869	803	—
1880	768	−4.4%
1890	727	−5.3%
1900	709	−2.5%
1910	639	−9.9%
1923	595	−6.9%
1934	682	+14.6%
1939	676	−0.9%
1951	759	+12.3%
1961	807	+6.3%
1971	822	+1.9%
1981	824	+0.2%
1991	783	−5.0%
2001	796	+1.7%
2011	712	−10.6%
2021	656	−7.9%
2025	669	+2.0%

== Politics ==
The municipal council (Gemeinderat) consists of 11 members. Since the 2022 Tyrolean local elections, it is made up of the following party/ list:

- Austrian People's Party (ÖVP): 11 seats

The mayor of Obertilliach, Matthias Scherer, was re-elected in 2022.
