= Dellach =

- Municipality
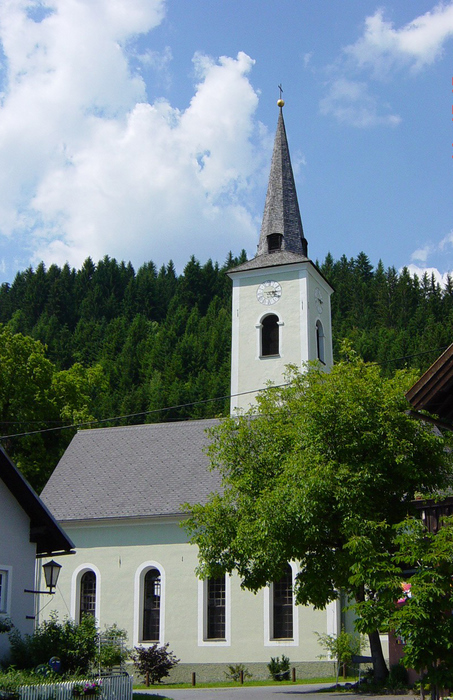
- St Nicholas Church

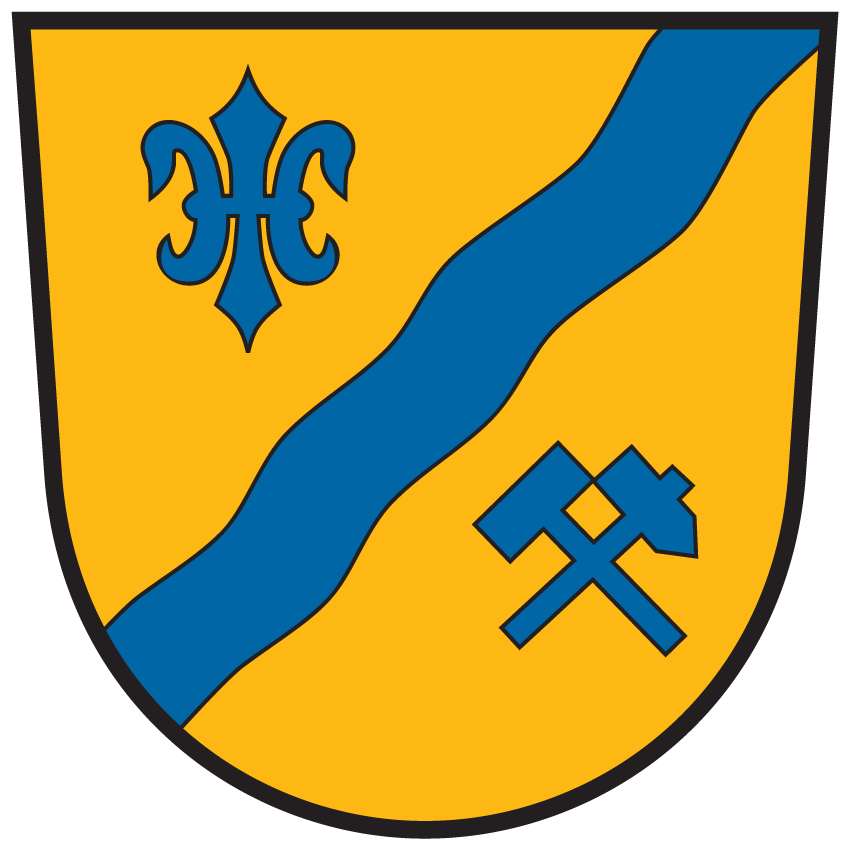
- Coat of arms

- Location within Austria
- Coordinates: 46°40′N 13°4′E
- Country: Austria
- State: Carinthia
- District: Hermagor

Government
  - Mayor: Johannes Lenzhofer (ÖVP)

Area
  - Total: 36.53 km^{2} (14.10 sq mi)
- Elevation: 672 m (2,205 ft)

Population (2018-01-01)
  - Total: 1,231
  - Density: 33.70/km^{2} (87.28/sq mi)
- Time zone: UTC+1 (CET)
  - Summer (DST): UTC+2 (CEST)
- Postal code: 9635
- Website: www.gemeinde-dellach.at

Dellach (Slovene: Dole) is a municipality in the district of Hermagor, in the Austrian state of Carinthia.

== Geography ==
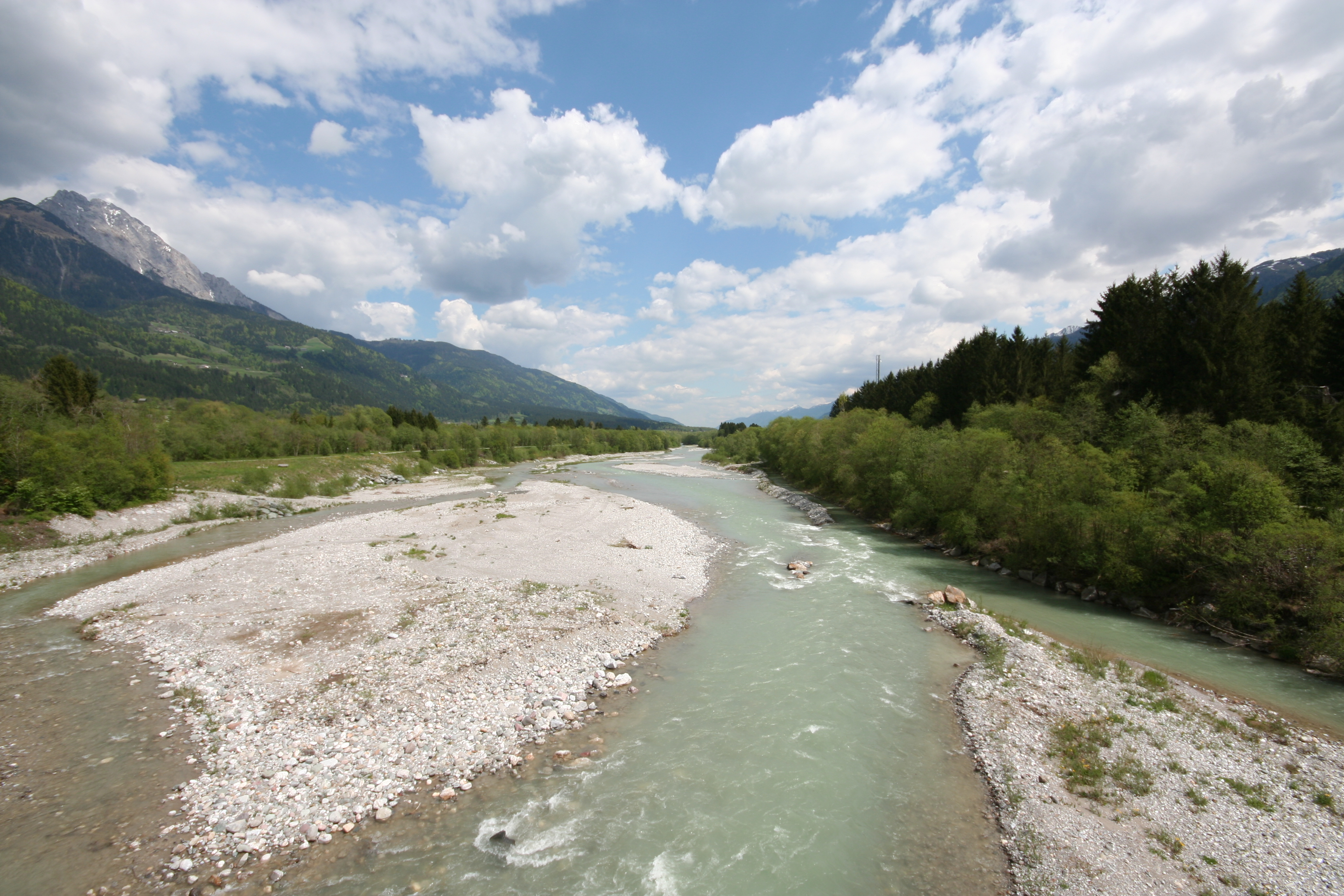
Gail river, with Mt. Reißkofel on the left

The municipal area lies in the upper Gail valley, between the neighbouring municipalities of Kötschach-Mauthen in the west and Kirchbach in the east. The Carnic Alps in the south form the border with Paularo in Italy. In the north rises Mt. Reißkofel, the highest peak of the Gailtal Alps east of the Lienz Dolomites, with an elevation of 2,371 metres (7,779 ft).

== History ==
Archaeological findings in the hamlet of Gurina denote a settlement since the age of the Hallstatt culture, when the local Celtic population ran copper smelting facilities to coin mints. It became one of the first Roman cities in present-day Austria, when the area was part of the Noricum province.

The village of Doelach itself was first mentioned in a 1370 deed; the name was possibly derived from Slavic dolina: "valley". A church in nearby Sankt Daniel existed since Carolingian times. For a long time, the estates were held by the Counts of Gorizia, until they fell to the Austrian House of Habsburg. The present-day municipality was established in 1850.

== Politics ==
The municipal council (Gemeinderat) consists of 15 members. Since the 2021 Carinthian local elections, it is made up of the following parties:

- Austrian People's Party (ÖVP): 9 seats
- Freedom Party of Austria (FPÖ): 3 seats
- Social Democratic Party of Austria (SPÖ): 3 seats

The mayor of Dellach, Johannes Lenzhofer (ÖVP), was re-elected in 2021.
