= Carinthia West (National Council electoral district) =

Parliamentary electoral district in Austria

- Kärnten West; Koroška zahodna
- Electoral District for the National Council
- Location of Carinthia West within Austria
- District: List: Feldkirchen; Hermagor; Spittal an der Drau
- State: Carinthia
- Population: 123,773 (2024)
- Electorate: 100,053 (2019)
- Area: 4,132 km^{2} (2023)

Current Electoral District
- Created: 1994
- Seats: 3 (1994–present)
- Members: Gabriel Obernosterer (ÖVP)

Carinthia West (German: Kärnten West; Slovene: Koroška zahodna), also known as Electoral District 2C (German: Wahlkreis 2C), is one of the 39 multi-member regional electoral districts of the National Council, the lower house of the Austrian Parliament, the national legislature of Austria. The electoral district was created in 1992 when electoral regulations were amended to add regional electoral districts to the existing state-wide electoral districts and came into being at the following legislative election in 1994. It consists of the districts of Feldkirchen, Hermagor and Spittal an der Drau in the state of Carinthia. The electoral district currently elects three of the 183 members of the National Council using the open party-list proportional representation electoral system. At the 2019 legislative election the constituency had 100,053 registered electors.

== History ==
Carinthia West was one 43 regional electoral districts (regionalwahlkreise) established by the "National Council Electoral Regulations 1992" (Nationalrats-Wahlordnung 1992) passed by the National Council in 1992. It consisted of the districts of Feldkirchen, Hermagor and Spittal an der Drau in the state of Carinthia. The district was initially allocated three seats in May 1993.

== Electoral system ==
Carinthia West currently elects three of the 183 members of the National Council using the open party-list proportional representation electoral system. The allocation of seats is carried out in three stages. In the first stage, seats are allocated to parties (lists) at the regional level using a state-wide Hare quota (wahlzahl) (valid votes in the state divided by the number of seats in the state). In the second stage, seats are allocated to parties at the state/provincial level using the state-wide Hare quota (any seats won by the party at the regional stage are subtracted from the party's state seats). In the third and final stage, seats are allocated to parties at the federal/national level using the D'Hondt method (any seats won by the party at the regional and state stages are subtracted from the party's federal seats). Only parties that reach the 4% national threshold, or have won a seat at the regional stage, compete for seats at the state and federal stages.

Electors may cast one preferential vote for individual candidates at the regional, state and federal levels. Split-ticket voting (panachage), or voting for more than one candidate at each level, is not permitted and will result in the ballot paper being invalidated. At the regional level, candidates must receive preferential votes amounting to at least 14% of the valid votes cast for their party to over-ride the order of the party list (10% and 7% respectively for the state and federal levels). Prior to April 2013 electors could not cast preferential votes at the federal level and the thresholds candidates needed to over-ride the party list order were higher at the regional level (half the Hare quota or 1/6 of the party votes) and state level (Hare quota).

== Election results ==
=== Summary ===
Election	Communists KPÖ+ / KPÖ			Social Democrats SPÖ			Greens GRÜNE			NEOS NEOS / LiF			People's ÖVP			Alliance for the Future BZÖ			Freedom FPÖ		
Election	Votes	%	Seats	Votes	%	Seats	Votes	%	Seats	Votes	%	Seats	Votes	%	Seats	Votes	%	Seats	Votes	%	Seats
2019	267	0.37%	0	16,817	23.32%	0	5,412	7.50%	0	4,758	6.60%	0	27,407	38.00%	1	119	0.16%	0	16,159	22.40%	0
2017	271	0.35%	0	20,944	26.68%	0	1,562	1.99%	0	3,149	4.01%	0	23,224	29.58%	0				26,250	33.43%	1
2013	306	0.42%	0	21,553	29.24%	0	7,144	9.69%	0	3,101	4.21%	0	13,629	18.49%	0	7,750	10.52%	0	14,033	19.04%	0
2008	315	0.39%	0	21,371	26.34%	0	4,025	4.96%	0	871	1.07%	0	14,015	17.27%	0	32,233	39.72%	1	6,317	7.78%	0
2006	501	0.65%	0	24,807	32.27%	0	4,101	5.34%	0				19,184	24.96%	0	20,420	26.57%	0	5,837	7.59%	0
2002	390	0.48%	0	27,932	34.36%	1	3,828	4.71%	0	605	0.74%	0	26,810	32.98%	1				21,724	26.72%	0
1999	191	0.24%	0	25,860	33.11%	1	3,476	4.45%	0	1,632	2.09%	0	15,285	19.57%	0				30,980	39.66%	1
1995	133	0.16%	0	30,407	36.96%	1	2,675	3.25%	0	2,410	2.93%	0	17,637	21.44%	0				28,477	34.61%	1
1994	82	0.10%	0	28,989	36.48%	1	3,873	4.87%	0	2,716	3.42%	0	15,781	19.86%	0				27,471	34.57%	1

=== Detailed ===
==== 2010s ====
===== 2019 =====
Results of the 2019 legislative election held on 29 September 2019:

Party		Votes per district				Total votes	%	Seats
Party		Feld- kirchen	Herma- gor	Spittal an der Drau	Voting card	Total votes	%	Seats
Austrian People's Party	ÖVP	5,895	4,878	16,546	88	27,407	38.00%	1
Social Democratic Party of Austria	SPÖ	3,900	2,853	10,013	51	16,817	23.32%	0
Freedom Party of Austria	FPÖ	4,056	1,923	10,148	32	16,159	22.40%	0
The Greens – The Green Alternative	GRÜNE	1,206	765	3,365	76	5,412	7.50%	0
NEOS – The New Austria and Liberal Forum	NEOS	1,074	670	2,968	46	4,758	6.60%	0
JETZT	JETZT	237	119	551	19	926	1.28%	0
KPÖ Plus	KPÖ+	80	35	149	3	267	0.37%	0
Der Wandel	WANDL	80	37	141	2	260	0.36%	0
Alliance for the Future of Austria	BZÖ	31	16	72	0	119	0.16%	0
Valid Votes		16,559	11,296	43,953	317	72,125	100.00%	1
Rejected Votes		315	225	737	4	1,281	1.75%	
Total Polled		16,874	11,521	44,690	321	73,406	73.37%	
Registered Electors		23,915	14,669	61,469		100,053		
Turnout		70.56%	78.54%	72.70%		73.37%		

The following candidates were elected:

- Personal mandates - Gabriel Obernosterer (ÖVP), 4,830 votes.

===== 2017 =====
Results of the 2017 legislative election held on 15 October 2017:

Party		Votes per district				Total votes	%	Seats
Party		Feld- kirchen	Herma- gor	Spittal an der Drau	Voting card	Total votes	%	Seats
Freedom Party of Austria	FPÖ	6,710	3,157	16,333	50	26,250	33.43%	1
Austrian People's Party	ÖVP	4,990	4,307	13,808	119	23,224	29.58%	0
Social Democratic Party of Austria	SPÖ	4,604	3,410	12,841	89	20,944	26.68%	0
NEOS – The New Austria and Liberal Forum	NEOS	733	433	1,932	51	3,149	4.01%	0
Peter Pilz List	PILZ	622	299	1,256	38	2,215	2.82%	0
The Greens – The Green Alternative	GRÜNE	331	256	954	21	1,562	1.99%	0
My Vote Counts!	GILT	148	90	390	6	634	0.81%	0
Communist Party of Austria	KPÖ	50	45	170	6	271	0.35%	0
The Whites	WEIßE	37	22	89	1	149	0.19%	0
Free List Austria	FLÖ	22	14	76	1	113	0.14%	0
Valid Votes		18,247	12,033	47,849	382	78,511	100.00%	1
Rejected Votes		248	206	654	3	1,111	1.40%	
Total Polled		18,495	12,239	48,503	385	79,622	78.92%	
Registered Electors		24,126	14,827	61,941		100,894		
Turnout		76.66%	82.55%	78.31%		78.92%		

The following candidates were elected:

- Party mandates - Erwin Angerer (FPÖ), 2,775 votes.

===== 2013 =====
Results of the 2013 legislative election held on 29 September 2013:

Party		Votes per district				Total votes	%	Seats
Party		Feld- kirchen	Herma- gor	Spittal an der Drau	Voting card	Total votes	%	Seats
Social Democratic Party of Austria	SPÖ	4,913	3,535	13,062	43	21,553	29.24%	0
Freedom Party of Austria	FPÖ	3,530	1,687	8,789	27	14,033	19.04%	0
Austrian People's Party	ÖVP	2,453	3,350	7,770	56	13,629	18.49%	0
Alliance for the Future of Austria	BZÖ	2,053	973	4,705	19	7,750	10.52%	0
The Greens – The Green Alternative	GRÜNE	1,685	976	4,410	73	7,144	9.69%	0
Team Stronach	FRANK	1,366	645	3,762	13	5,786	7.85%	0
NEOS – The New Austria	NEOS	567	285	2,217	32	3,101	4.21%	0
Pirate Party of Austria	PIRAT	93	51	250	5	399	0.54%	0
Communist Party of Austria	KPÖ	68	36	197	5	306	0.42%	0
Valid Votes		16,728	11,538	45,162	273	73,701	100.00%	0
Rejected Votes		337	289	828	3	1,457	1.94%	
Total Polled		17,065	11,827	45,990	276	75,158	73.28%	
Registered Electors		24,485	15,190	62,886		102,561		
Turnout		69.70%	77.86%	73.13%		73.28%		

==== 2000s ====
===== 2008 =====
Results of the 2008 legislative election held on 28 September 2008:

Party		Votes per district				Total votes	%	Seats
Party		Feld- kirchen	Herma- gor	Spittal an der Drau	Voting card	Total votes	%	Seats
Alliance for the Future of Austria	BZÖ	7,840	4,001	20,150	242	32,233	39.72%	1
Social Democratic Party of Austria	SPÖ	4,805	3,428	12,975	163	21,371	26.34%	0
Austrian People's Party	ÖVP	2,527	2,978	8,313	197	14,015	17.27%	0
Freedom Party of Austria	FPÖ	1,588	948	3,704	77	6,317	7.78%	0
The Greens – The Green Alternative	GRÜNE	866	599	2,352	208	4,025	4.96%	0
Fritz Dinkhauser List – Citizens' Forum Tyrol	FRITZ	174	146	539	19	878	1.08%	0
Liberal Forum	LiF	175	130	516	50	871	1.07%	0
Independent Citizens' Initiative Save Austria	RETTÖ	143	60	311	1	515	0.63%	0
The Christians	DC	128	81	302	4	515	0.63%	0
Communist Party of Austria	KPÖ	70	50	184	11	315	0.39%	0
List Karlheinz Klement	KHK	18	7	34	0	59	0.07%	0
List Strong	STARK	11	4	17	0	32	0.04%	0
Valid Votes		18,345	12,432	49,397	972	81,146	100.00%	1
Rejected Votes		388	349	1,072	16	1,825	2.20%	
Total Polled		18,733	12,781	50,469	988	82,971	79.26%	
Registered Electors		24,595	15,650	64,434		104,679		
Turnout		76.17%	81.67%	78.33%		79.26%		

The following candidates were elected:

- Party mandates - Josef Jury (BZÖ), 2,081 votes.

===== 2006 =====
Results of the 2006 legislative election held on 1 October 2006:

Party		Votes per district				Total votes	%	Seats
Party		Feld- kirchen	Herma- gor	Spittal an der Drau	Voting card	Total votes	%	Seats
Social Democratic Party of Austria	SPÖ	5,460	3,695	14,632	1,020	24,807	32.27%	0
Alliance for the Future of Austria	BZÖ	4,354	2,430	13,025	611	20,420	26.57%	0
Austrian People's Party	ÖVP	3,598	3,579	10,678	1,329	19,184	24.96%	0
Freedom Party of Austria	FPÖ	1,434	883	3,261	259	5,837	7.59%	0
The Greens – The Green Alternative	GRÜNE	760	537	2,173	631	4,101	5.34%	0
Hans-Peter Martin's List	MATIN	377	173	809	56	1,415	1.84%	0
Communist Party of Austria	KPÖ	107	65	296	33	501	0.65%	0
Certainly – Absolutely – Independent, Franz Radinger	SAU	164	41	123	12	340	0.44%	0
EU Withdrawal – Neutral Free Austria	NFÖ	55	14	131	10	210	0.27%	0
List Strong	STARK	12	9	26	0	47	0.06%	0
Valid Votes		16,321	11,426	45,154	3,961	76,862	100.00%	0
Rejected Votes		442	358	1,072	69	1,941	2.46%	
Total Polled		16,763	11,784	46,226	4,030	78,803	77.82%	
Registered Electors		23,509	15,203	62,553		101,265		
Turnout		71.30%	77.51%	73.90%		77.82%		

===== 2002 =====
Results of the 2002 legislative election held on 24 November 2002:

Party		Votes per district				Total votes	%	Seats
Party		Feld- kirchen	Herma- gor	Spittal an der Drau	Voting card	Total votes	%	Seats
Social Democratic Party of Austria	SPÖ	6,211	4,231	16,295	1,195	27,932	34.36%	1
Austrian People's Party	ÖVP	5,241	4,564	15,231	1,774	26,810	32.98%	1
Freedom Party of Austria	FPÖ	4,983	2,678	13,312	751	21,724	26.72%	0
The Greens – The Green Alternative	GRÜNE	681	432	1,925	790	3,828	4.71%	0
Liberal Forum	LiF	122	82	339	62	605	0.74%	0
Communist Party of Austria	KPÖ	83	50	242	15	390	0.48%	0
Valid Votes		17,321	12,037	47,344	4,587	81,289	100.00%	2
Rejected Votes		376	292	1,020	61	1,749	2.11%	
Total Polled		17,697	12,329	48,364	4,648	83,038	83.80%	
Registered Electors		22,599	15,143	61,352		99,094		
Turnout		78.31%	81.42%	78.83%		83.80%		

The following candidates were elected:

- Party mandates - Walter Posch (SPÖ), 3,965 votes; and Josef Winkler (ÖVP), 1,610 votes.

==== 1990s ====
===== 1999 =====
Results of the 1999 legislative election held on 3 October 1999:

Party		Votes per district				Total votes	%	Seats
Party		Feld- kirchen	Herma- gor	Spittal an der Drau	Voting card	Total votes	%	Seats
Freedom Party of Austria	FPÖ	7,041	4,028	18,704	1,207	30,980	39.66%	1
Social Democratic Party of Austria	SPÖ	5,340	4,133	15,320	1,067	25,860	33.11%	1
Austrian People's Party	ÖVP	2,790	3,086	8,595	814	15,285	19.57%	0
The Greens – The Green Alternative	GRÜNE	675	407	1,881	513	3,476	4.45%	0
Liberal Forum	LiF	233	172	872	355	1,632	2.09%	0
The Independents	DU	116	64	305	19	504	0.65%	0
Communist Party of Austria	KPÖ	22	24	131	14	191	0.24%	0
No to NATO and EU – Neutral Austria Citizens' Initiative	NEIN	47	18	109	12	186	0.24%	0
Valid Votes		16,264	11,932	45,917	4,001	78,114	100.00%	2
Rejected Votes		270	223	734	30	1,257	1.58%	
Total Polled		16,534	12,155	46,651	4,031	79,371	80.20%	
Registered Electors		22,315	15,344	61,302		98,961		
Turnout		74.09%	79.22%	76.10%		80.20%		

The following candidates were elected:

- Party mandates - Herbert Haupt (FPÖ), 4,278 votes; and Walter Posch (SPÖ), 3,189 votes.

Substitutions:

- Herbert Haupt (FPÖ) resigned on 27 October 2000 and was replaced by Kurt Scheuch (FPÖ) on 30 October 2000.

===== 1995 =====
Results of the 1995 legislative election held on 17 December 1995:

Party		Votes per district				Total votes	%	Seats
Party		Feld- kirchen	Herma- gor	Spittal an der Drau	Voting card	Total votes	%	Seats
Social Democratic Party of Austria	SPÖ	6,524	4,614	18,162	1,107	30,407	36.96%	1
Freedom Party of Austria	FPÖ	6,677	3,571	17,104	1,125	28,477	34.61%	1
Austrian People's Party	ÖVP	3,104	3,532	10,032	969	17,637	21.44%	0
The Greens – The Green Alternative	GRÜNE	448	294	1,363	570	2,675	3.25%	0
Liberal Forum	LiF	394	252	1,199	565	2,410	2.93%	0
No – Civic Action Group; Against the Sale of Austria	NEIN	96	48	245	22	411	0.50%	0
Communist Party of Austria	KPÖ	25	20	78	10	133	0.16%	0
The Best Party	DBP	23	25	65	8	121	0.15%	0
Valid Votes		17,291	12,356	48,248	4,376	82,271	100.00%	2
Rejected Votes		416	325	1,133	40	1,914	2.27%	
Total Polled		17,707	12,681	49,381	4,416	84,185	85.81%	
Registered Electors		22,025	15,308	60,777		98,110		
Turnout		80.40%	82.84%	81.25%		85.81%		

The following candidates were elected:

- Party mandates - Herbert Haupt (FPÖ), 4,126 votes; and Walter Posch (SPÖ), 2,548 votes.

===== 1994 =====
Results of the 1994 legislative election held on 9 October 1994:

Party		Votes per district				Total votes	%	Seats
Party		Feld- kirchen	Herma- gor	Spittal an der Drau	Voting card	Total votes	%	Seats
Social Democratic Party of Austria	SPÖ	6,078	4,484	17,335	1,092	28,989	36.48%	1
Freedom Party of Austria	FPÖ	6,125	3,473	16,739	1,134	27,471	34.57%	1
Austrian People's Party	ÖVP	2,886	3,247	8,868	780	15,781	19.86%	0
The Greens – The Green Alternative	GRÜNE	749	449	2,036	639	3,873	4.87%	0
Liberal Forum	LiF	416	286	1,541	473	2,716	3.42%	0
No – Civic Action Group; Against the Sale of Austria	NEIN	96	46	218	16	376	0.47%	0
United Greens Austria – List Adi Pinter	VGÖ	22	15	55	9	101	0.13%	0
Communist Party of Austria	KPÖ	12	15	44	11	82	0.10%	0
The Best Party	DBP	17	12	40	6	75	0.09%	0
Valid Votes		16,401	12,027	46,876	4,160	79,464	100.00%	2
Rejected Votes		292	246	884	61	1,483	1.83%	
Total Polled		16,693	12,273	47,760	4,221	80,947	82.52%	
Registered Electors		21,937	15,372	60,789		98,098		
Turnout		76.10%	79.84%	78.57%		82.52%		

The following candidates were elected:

- Personal mandates - Walter Posch (SPÖ), 5,564 votes.
- Party mandates - Herbert Haupt (FPÖ), 4,132 votes.
