= Paularo =

Paularo Paulâr (Friulian)
- Comune
- Comune di Paularo
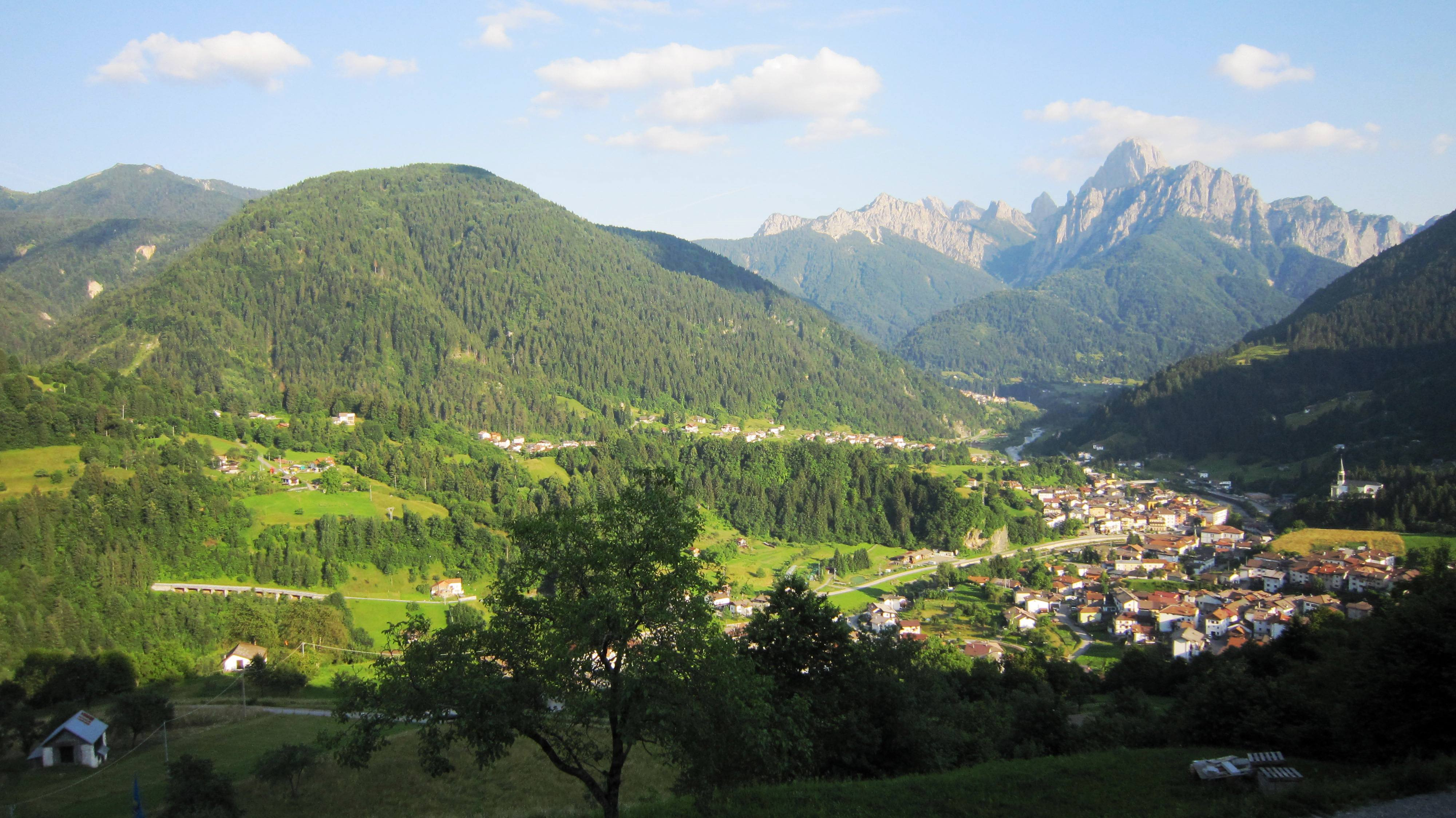

- Location within Italy Location within Friuli-Venezia Giulia
- Coordinates: 46°32′N 13°7′E
- Country: Italy
- Region: Friuli-Venezia Giulia
- Province: Udine (UD)
- Frazioni: Casaso, Dierico, Misincinis, Salino, Ravinis, Chiaulis, Castoia, Villamezzo, Villafuori, Rio, Cogliat, Lambrugno, Tavella, Trelli

Government
  - Mayor: Daniele Di Gleria

Area
  - Total: 84.24 km^{2} (32.53 sq mi)
- Elevation: 648 m (2,126 ft)

Population (31 December 2017)
  - Total: 2,556
  - Density: 30.34/km^{2} (78.59/sq mi)
- Demonym: Paularini
- Time zone: UTC+1 (CET)
  - Summer (DST): UTC+2 (CEST)
- Postal code: 33027
- Dialing code: 0433
- Website: Official website

Paularo (Friulian: Paulâr) is a comune (municipality) in the Regional decentralization entity of Udine in the Italian region of Friuli-Venezia Giulia, located about 110 kilometres (68 mi) northwest of Trieste and about 50 kilometres (31 mi) north of Udine, on the border with Austria.

Paularo borders the following municipalities: Arta Terme, Dellach im Gailtal (Austria), Hermagor-Pressegger See (Austria), Kirchbach (Austria), Kötschach-Mauthen (Austria), Moggio Udinese, Paluzza, Treppo Ligosullo.

== Twin towns ==
Paularo is twinned with:

- Sillingy, France, since 2000
- Kirchbach, Austria, since 2003
- Bucine, Italy, since 2009
