= Hermagor District =

Hermagor District Bezirk Hermagor
- District
- Coordinates: 46.662°N 13.183°E
- Country: Austria
- State: Carinthia
- Number of municipalities: 7
- Administrative seat: Hermagor-Pressegger See

Government
  - District Governor: Heinz Pansi

Area
  - Total: 808.0 km^{2} (312.0 sq mi)

Population (2016-01-01)
  - Total: 18,435
  - Density: 22.82/km^{2} (59.09/sq mi)
- Time zone: UTC+01:00 (CET)
  - Summer (DST): UTC+02:00 (CEST)
- Vehicle registration: HE
- NUTS code: ?

The Bezirk Hermagor (Slovene: Okrože Šmohor) is an administrative district (Bezirk) in Carinthia, Austria.

The district has an area of 808.02 km^{2} (311.98 sq mi) and a population of 18,435 (as of 1 January 2016). The administrative center of the district is Hermagor-Pressegger See.

== History ==
Its name refers to Saint Hermagoras, whose cult was centered at Aquileia.

== Municipalities ==
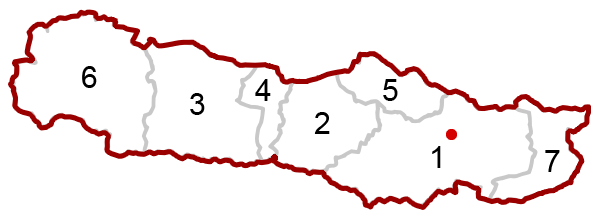

Towns (Städte) are indicated in boldface; market towns (Marktgemeinden) in italics; suburbs, hamlets and other subdivisions of a municipality are indicated in small characters.

- Dellach (Slov.: Dole) (**4**)
  - Dellach, Goldberg, Gurina, Höfling, Leifling, Monsell, Nölbling, Rüben, Siegelberg, St. Daniel, Stollwitz, Wieserberg
- Gitschtal (Slov.: Višprijska Dolina) (**5**)
  - Brunn, Golz, Jadersdorf, Langwiesen, Lassendorf, Leditz, Regitt, St. Lorenzen im Gitschtal, Weißbriach, Wulzentratten
- **Hermagor-Pressegger See** (Slov.: Šmohor - Preseško jezero) (**1**)
  - Achleiten, Aigen, Bergl, Braunitzen, Brugg, Burgstall, Danz, Dellach, Egg, Eggforst, Förolach, Fritzendorf, Görtschach, Götzing, Grafenau, Grünburg, Guggenberg, Hermagor, Jenig, Kameritsch, Khünburg, Kleinbergl, Kraschach, Kraß, Kreuth ob Mellweg, Kreuth ob Möschach, Kreuth ob Rattendorf, Kühweg, Kühwegboden, Latschach, Liesch, Mellach, Mellweg, Micheldorf, Mitschig, Möderndorf, Nampolach, Neudorf, Neuprießenegg, Obermöschach, Obervellach, Paßriach, Podlanig, Postran, Potschach, Potschach, Presseggen, Presseggersee, Radnig, Radnigforst, Rattendorf, Schinzengraben, Schlanitzen, Schmidt, Siebenbrünn, Sonnenalpe Naßfeld, Sonnleitn, Süßenberg, Toschehof, Tröpolach, Untermöschach, Untervellach, Watschig, Wittenig, Zuchen
- Kirchbach (Slov.: Cirkno) (**2**)
  - Anraun, Bodenmühl, Forst, Goderschach, Grafendorf, Griminitzen, Gundersheim, Hochwart, Katlingberg, Kirchbach, Krieben, Lenzhof, Oberbuchach, Oberdöbernitzen, Rauth, Reisach, Reißkofelbad, Rinsenegg, Schimanberg, Schmalzgrube, Schönboden, Staudachberg, Stöfflerberg, Stranig, Tramun, Treßdorf, Unterbuchach, Unterdöbernitzen, Waidegg, Wassertheurerberg, Welzberg
- Kötschach-Mauthen (Slov.: Koče - Muta) (**3**)
  - Aigen, Buchach, Dobra, Dolling, Gailberg, Gentschach, Gratzhof, Höfling, Kosta, Kötschach, Kreuth, Kreuzberg, Krieghof, Kronhof, Laas, Lanz, Mahlbach, Mandorf, Mauthen, Nischlwitz, Passau, Plöcken, Plon, Podlanig, Sittmoos, St. Jakob im Lesachtal, Strajach, Weidenburg, Wetzmann, Würda, Würmlach
- Lesachtal (Slov.: Lesna dolina) (**6**)
  - Assing, Birnbaum, Durnthal, Egg, Frohn, Guggenberg, Klebas, Kornat, Ladstatt, Liesing, Maria Luggau, Mattling, Moos, Niedergail, Nostra, Obergail, Oberring, Pallas, Promeggen, Raut, Rüben, Salach, St. Lorenzen im Lesachtal, Stabenthein, Sterzen, Tiefenbach, Tscheltsch, Tuffbad, Wiesen, Wodmaier, Xaveriberg
- Sankt Stefan im Gailtal (Slov.: Štefan na Zilji) (**7**)
  - Bach, Bichlhof, Bodenhof, Dragantschach, Edling, Hadersdorf, Karnitzen, Köstendorf, Latschach, Matschiedl, Nieselach, Pölland, Pörtschach, Schinzengraben, Schmölzing, St. Paul an der Gail, St. Stefan an der Gail, Sussawitsch, Tratten, Vorderberg
