= Gitschtal =

- Municipality
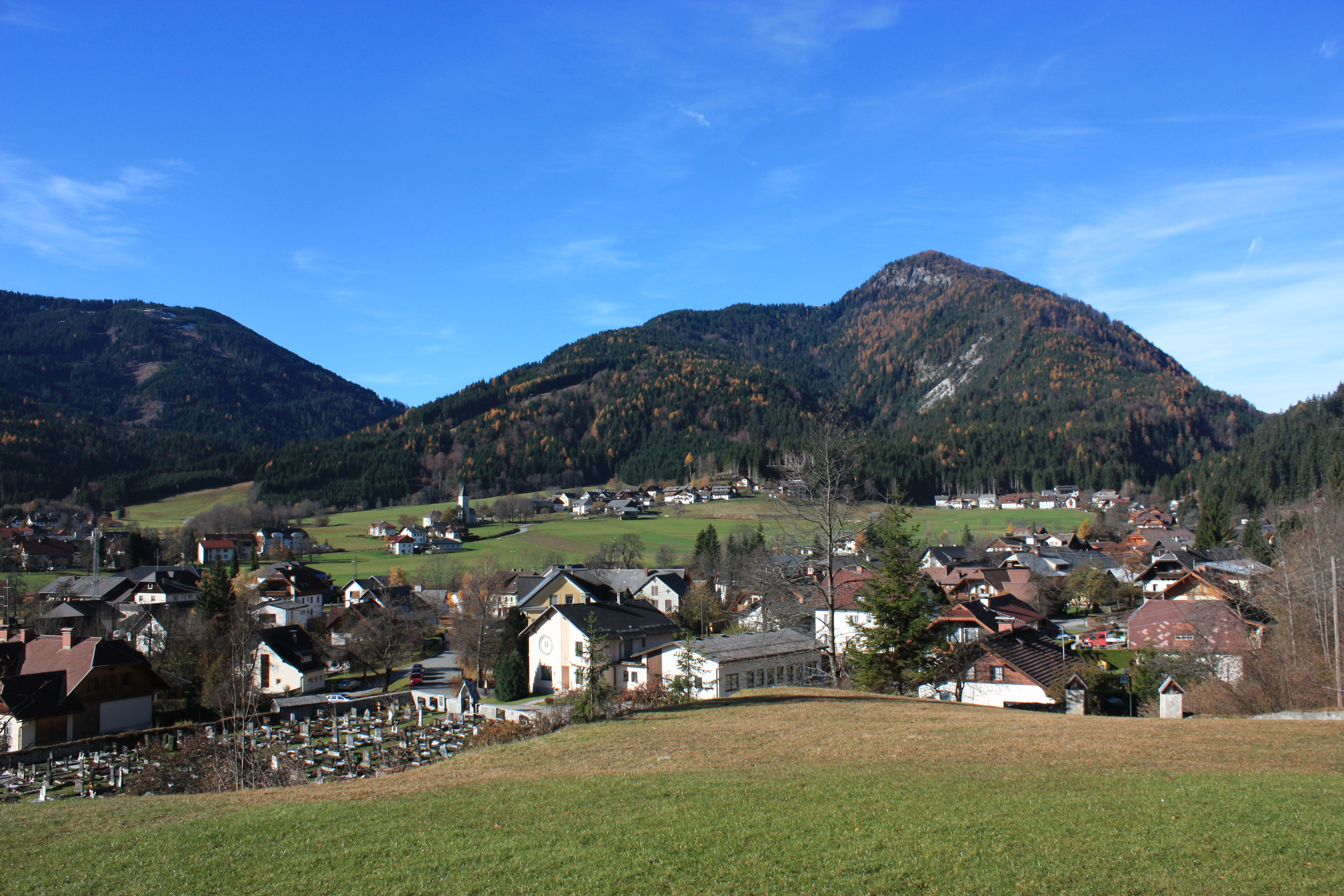
- The village of Weißbriach

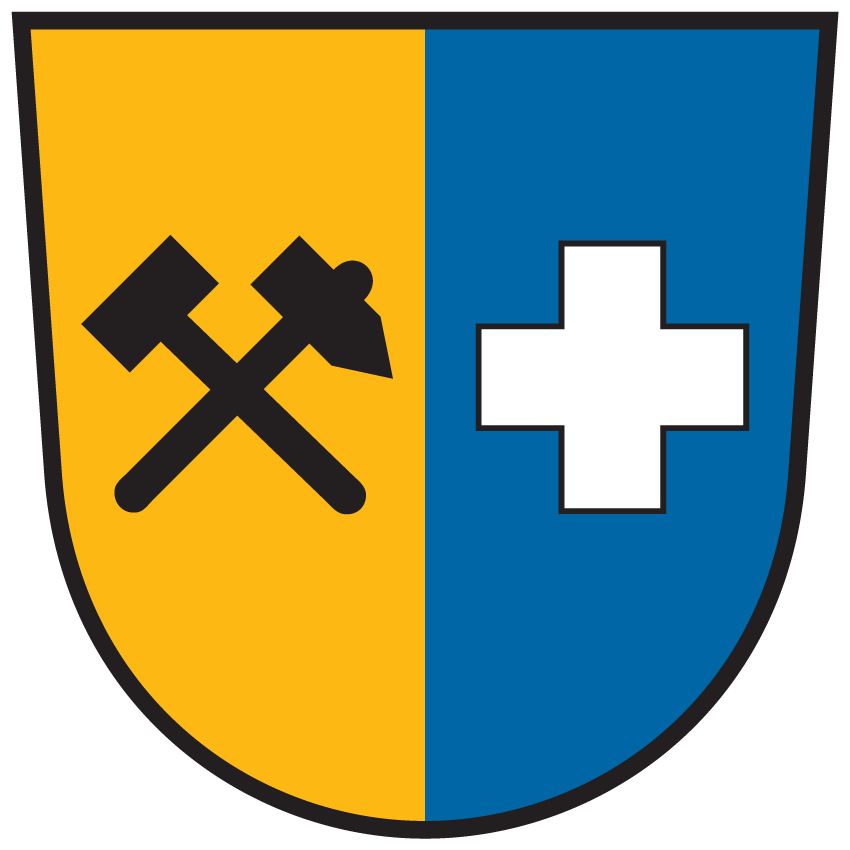
- Coat of arms

- Location within Austria
- Coordinates: 46°41′N 13°14′E
- Country: Austria
- State: Carinthia
- District: Hermagor

Government
  - Mayor: Christian Müller (FPÖ)

Area
  - Total: 56.49 km^{2} (21.81 sq mi)
- Elevation: 817 m (2,680 ft)

Population (2018-01-01)
  - Total: 1,261
  - Density: 22.32/km^{2} (57.82/sq mi)
- Time zone: UTC+1 (CET)
  - Summer (DST): UTC+2 (CEST)
- Postal code: 9622
- Website: www.gitschtal.at

Gitschtal (Slovene: Višprijska dolina) is a town in the district of Hermagor in the Austrian state of Carinthia.

== Geography ==
The municipality lies next to Hermagor to the northwest. Its principal stream is the Gössering, which flows into the Gail south of Hermagor.

The floor of the valley is about a kilometer wide.

== Politics ==
The municipal council (Gemeinderat) consists of 15 members. Following the 2021 Carinthian local elections, the seat distribution is as follows:

- Freedom Party of Austria (FPÖ): 8 seats
- Social Democratic Party of Austria (SPÖ): 4 seats
- Austrian People's Party (ÖVP): 3 seats

The mayor of Gitschtal, Christian Müller (FPÖ), was elected in 2021.
