= Klebas =

Locality in Hermagor District, Austria

Coordinates: 46°041′040″N 12°048′042″E

Klebas (pop. 91) is one of the 31 localities belonging to the municipality of Lesachtal in Carinthia (Austria).
