= St. Stefan im Gailtal =

- Municipality
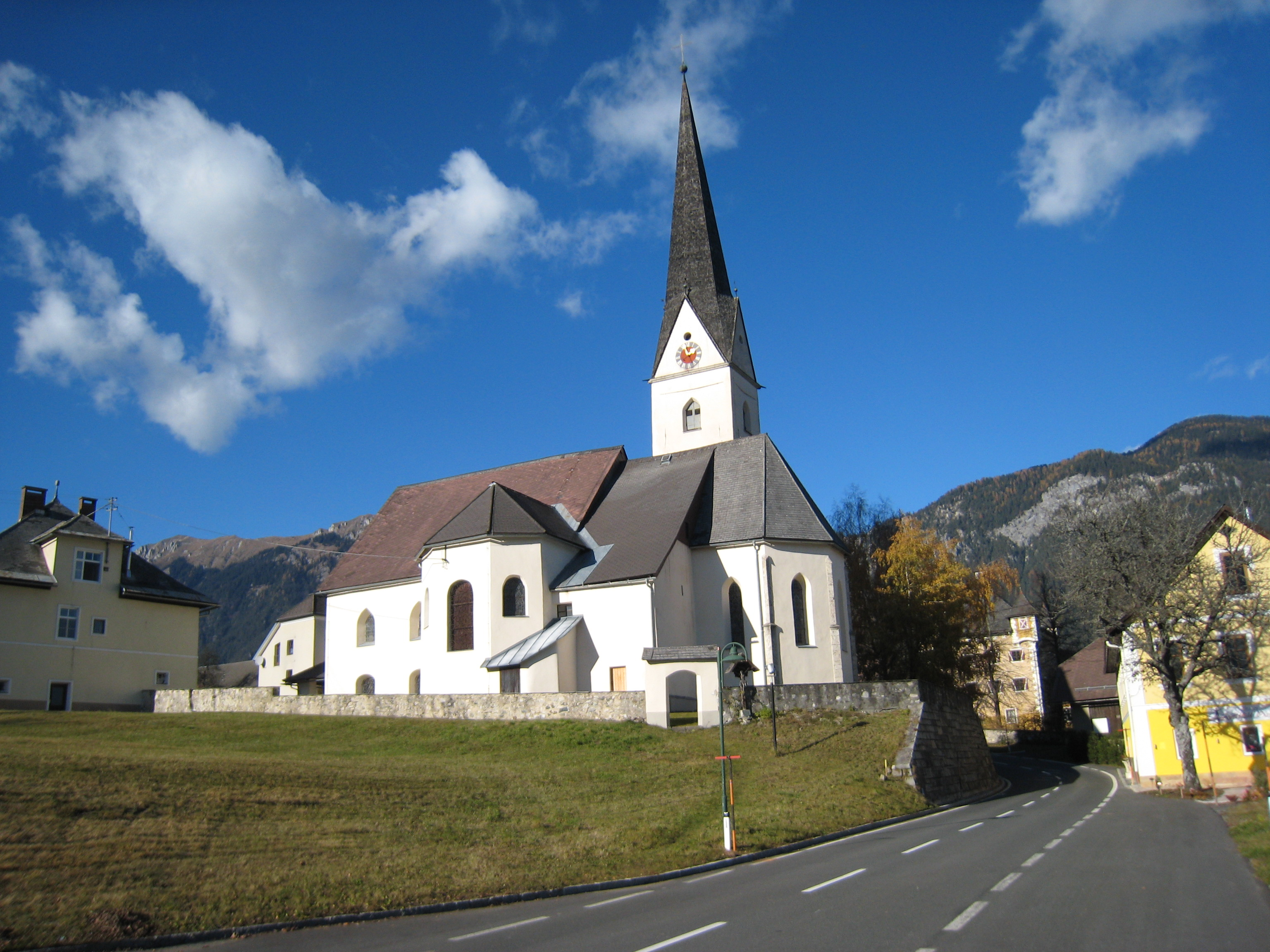
- Sankt Stefan im Gailtal parish church

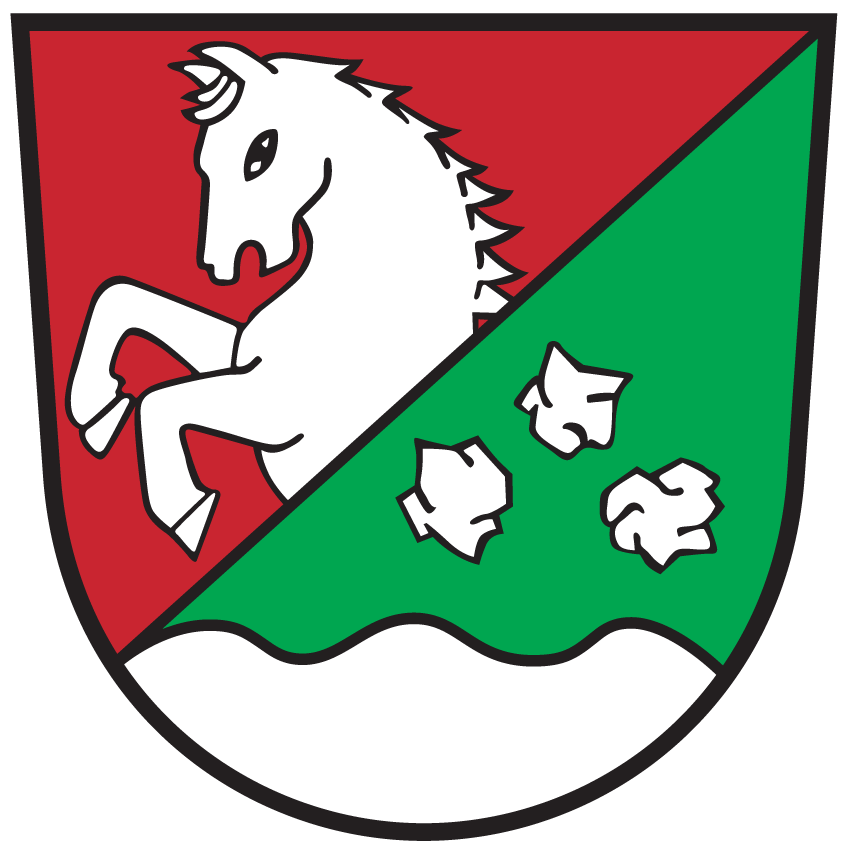
- Coat of arms

- Location within Austria
- Coordinates: 46°37′N 13°31′E
- Country: Austria
- State: Carinthia
- District: Hermagor

Government
  - Mayor: Johann Ferlitsch

Area
  - Total: 66.38 km^{2} (25.63 sq mi)
- Elevation: 726 m (2,382 ft)

Population (2018-01-01)
  - Total: 1,593
  - Density: 24.00/km^{2} (62.16/sq mi)
- Time zone: UTC+1 (CET)
  - Summer (DST): UTC+2 (CEST)
- Postal code: 9623
- Area code: 04382
- Website: www.st.stefan-gailtal.at

St. Stefan im Gailtal (Slovene: Štefan na Zilji) is a small municipality in the district of Hermagor in the Austrian state of Carinthia.

== Geography ==
St. Stefan lies on both sides of the Gail in the lower Gail valley between the main range of the Karnisch Alps on the south and the Gailtal Alps on the north.
