= Lesachtal =

- Municipality
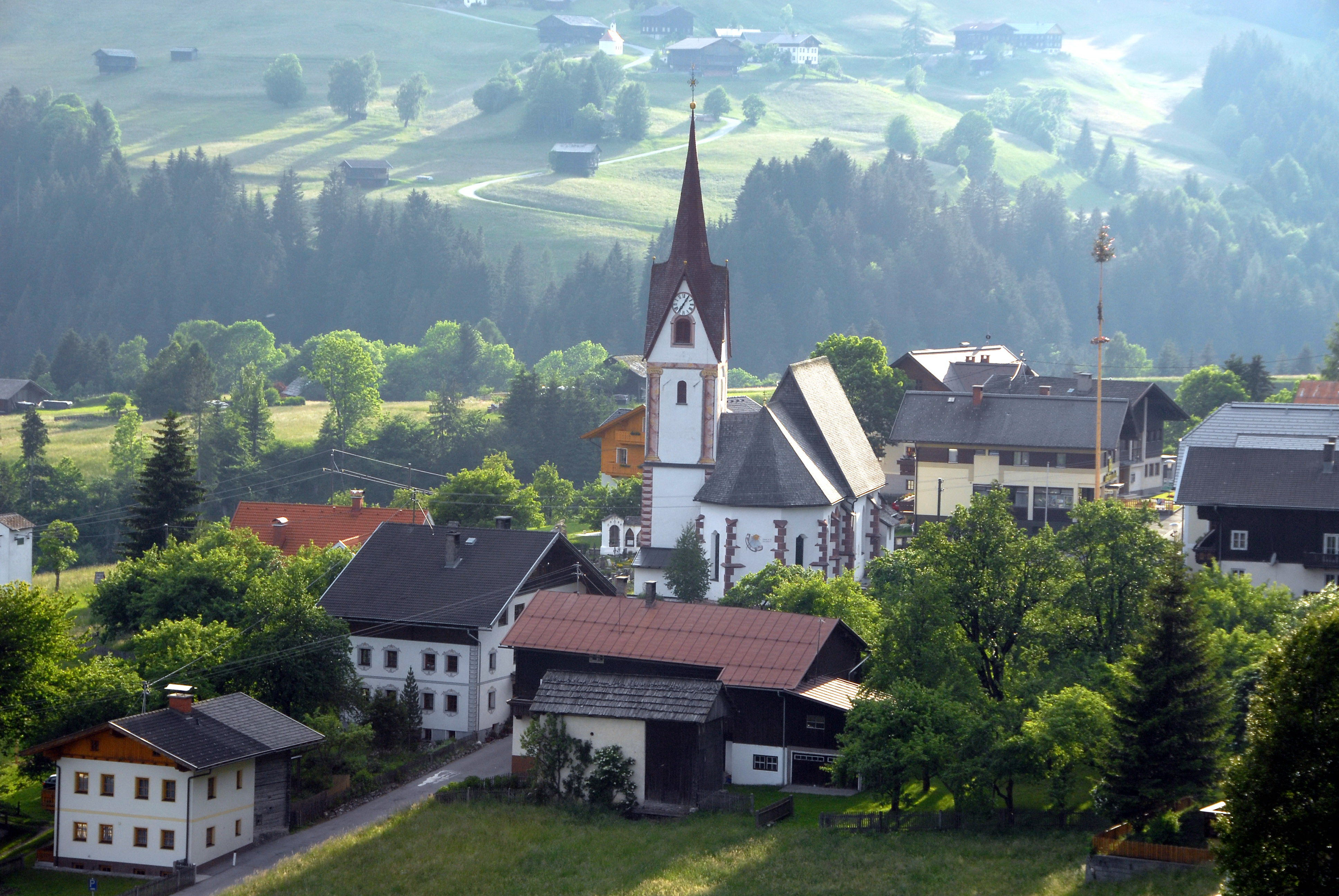
- Liesing

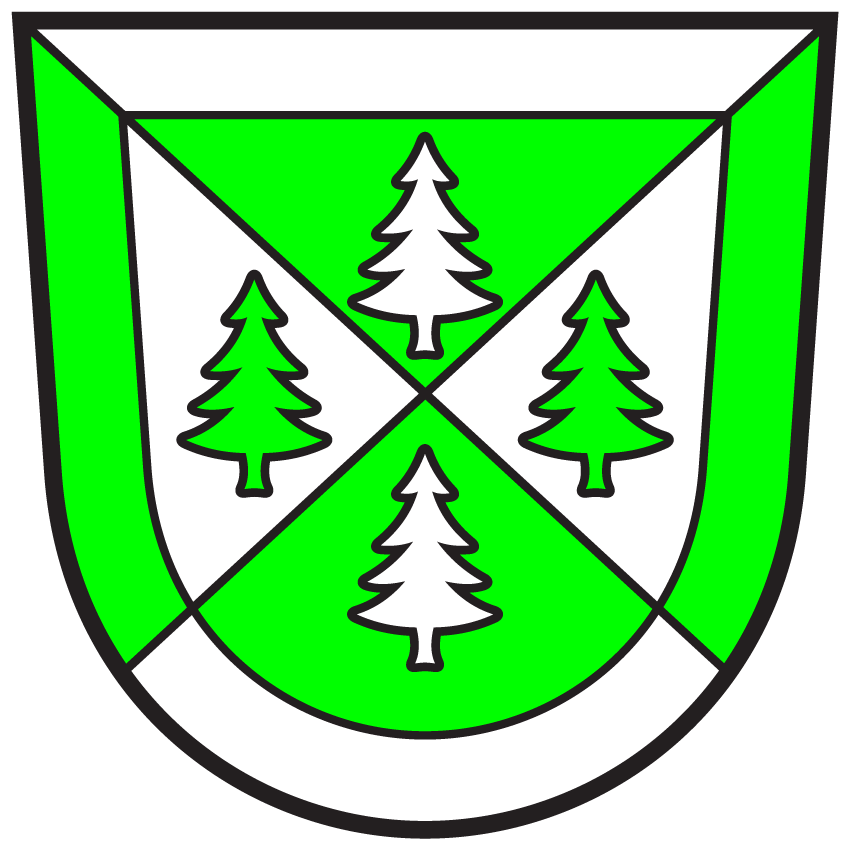
- Coat of arms

- Location within Austria
- Coordinates: 46°42′N 12°49′E
- Country: Austria
- State: Carinthia
- District: Hermagor

Government
  - Mayor: Johann Windbichler

Area
  - Total: 190.75 km^{2} (73.65 sq mi)
- Elevation: 1,044 m (3,425 ft)

Population (2018-01-01)
  - Total: 1,318
  - Density: 6.910/km^{2} (17.90/sq mi)
- Time zone: UTC+1 (CET)
  - Summer (DST): UTC+2 (CEST)
- Postal code: 9653

Lesachtal (Slovene: Lesna dolina) is a municipality in Hermagor District, in the Austrian state of Carinthia. It comprises the western part of the eponymous valley formed by the upper Gail River, and stretches from the Carinthian border with East Tyrol down to Kötschach-Mauthen in the east.

== Geography ==
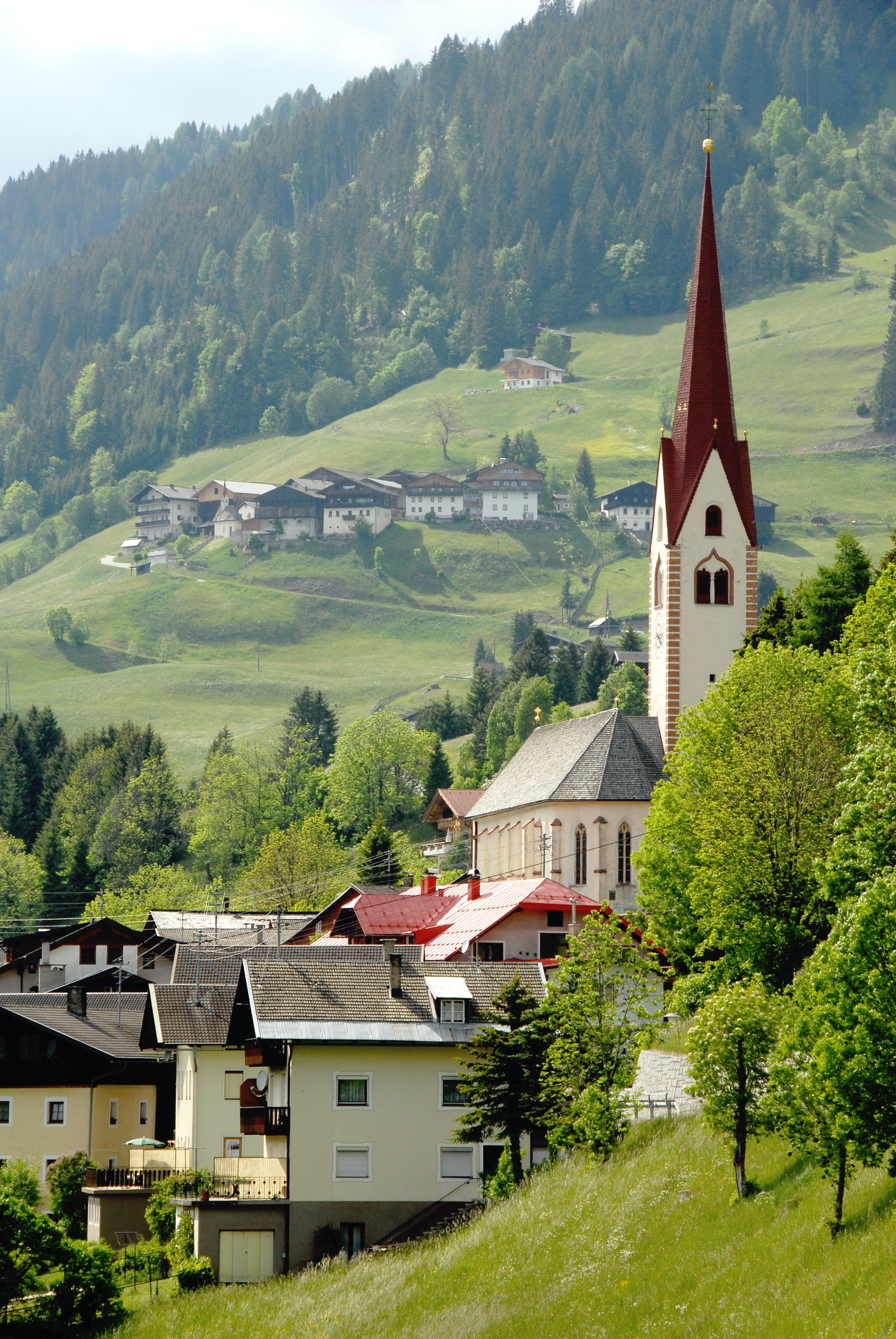
Sankt Lorenzen

The Lesach Valley is located in the southwest of Carinthia. In adjacent East Tyrol, the uppermost continuation of the Gail river course is called Tilliach Valley. The lower eastern third of the Lesach Valley around the village of Sankt Jakob is part of the neighbouring Kötschach-Mauthen municipality.

The narrow valley borders the Lienz Dolomites range of the Gailtal Alps to the north and the Carnic Alps up to 2,780 m (9,120 ft) high Mt. Hohe Warte (Italian: Coglians) to the south, forming the border with Italy. Most settlements and paths are on the northern slopes over 300 m (980 ft) above the Gail River gorge.

The municipality of Lesachtal (area 19.62 km^{2}, pop. 1,665) comprises the cadastral communities of Kornat, Liesing, Maria Luggau, and Sankt Lorenzen im Lesachtal.

=== Language ===
The language spoken in the Lesachtal valley is linguistically remarkable, because the Southern Bavarian dialect is not Carinthian, but rather East-Tyrolean with slight variations. Slovenian elements have also survived in local common speech.

== History ==
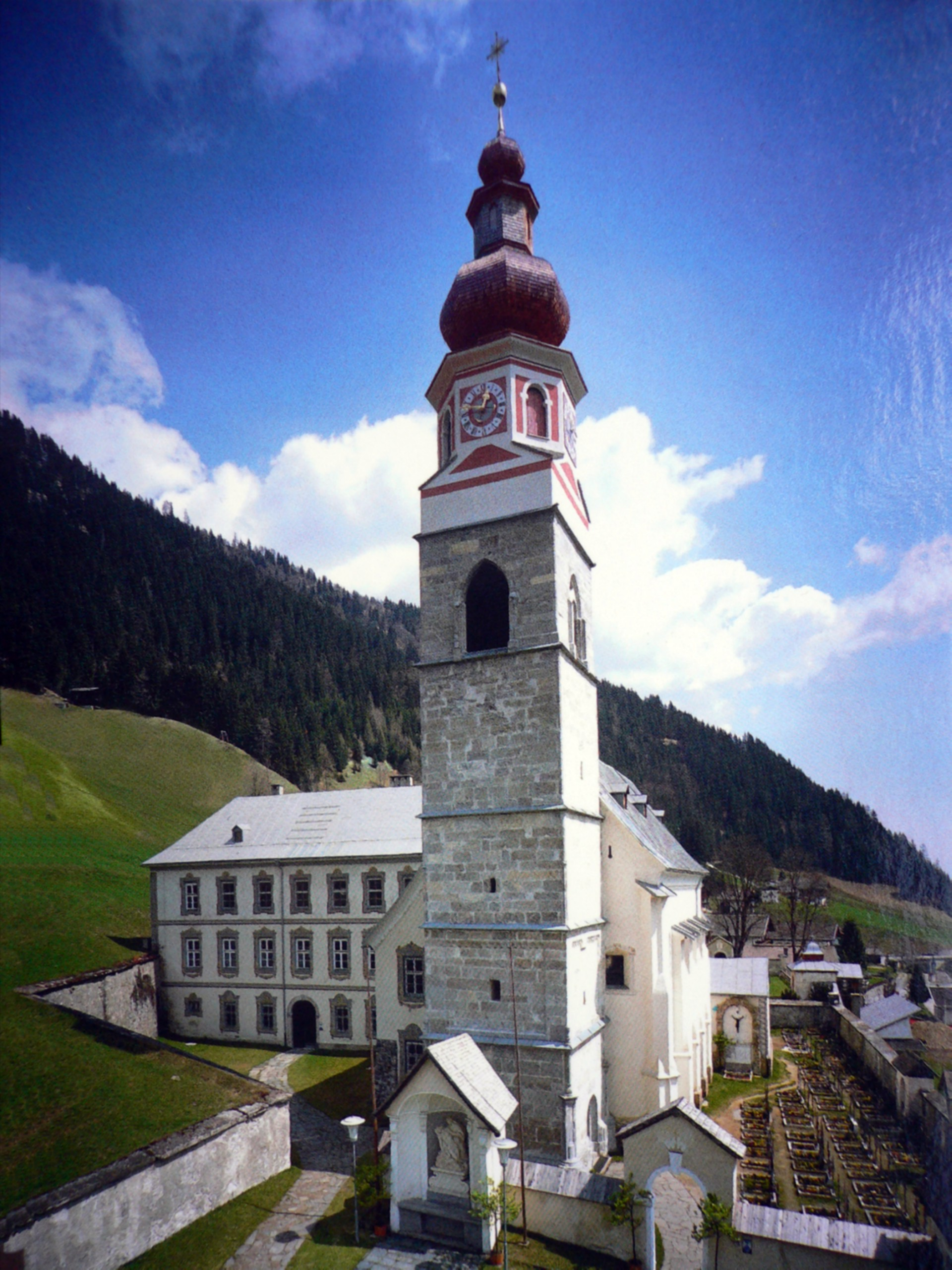
Our Lady of Snows pilgrimage church, Maria Luggau

The Lesach Valley (derived from Slavic: les 'forest') was inhabited by Slavs about AD 600. In the 8th century, it was one of the first valleys in the Principality of Carantania to be Germanised after Prince Boruth acknowledged the overlordship of Duke Odilo of Bavaria about 740.

In 1380, the Lesach circuit (Landgericht Lesach) was transferred to the lordship of Pittersberg, named after a nearby rock castle, then an administrative seat held by the East Tyrolean Meinhardiner Counts of Gorizia. After their branch died out in the male line, the last countess Margaret bequeathed the lordship to the reigning princes of the House of Habsburg in 1363. Later it fell to the Carinthian Counts of Ortenburg.

With the creation of the Austrian municipalities (Ortsgemeinden) in 1850, the three municipalities Luggau, Sankt Lorenzen, and Liesing were constituted. The cadastral communities (Katastralgemeinden) Kornach and Strajach merged with the municipality of Mauthen, but in 1182 obtained independent status as the municipality of Unterlesach. Ten years later the two localities Birnbaum and Sankt Jakob became independent municipalities as well. Through Carinthian local government reform in 1973, the eastern Lesach municipality of Sankt Jakob merged with Kötschach-Mauthen, while the four western municipalities were merged into the present municipality of Lesachtal.

During World War I the Italian front between the Austro-Hungarian Army and the Royal Italian Army was located on the ridge of the Carnic Alps. Many old positions and fortifications bear witness to the attritional mountain war from 1915 to 1918.

== Population ==
In 2024, the municipality of Lesachtal had 1,269 inhabitants, of which 95.9% were Austrian citizens. The population has been declining in recent decades.

== Politics ==
The municipal assembly (Gemeinderat) consists of 15 members. Since the 2021 local elections, it is made up of the following parties:

- Austrian People's Party (ÖVP): 8 seats
- Social Democratic Party of Austria (SPÖ): 7 seats

The mayor of the municipality, Johann Windbichler, was re-elected in 2021.

== Notable people ==
- Matthias von Lexer (1830–92), lexicographer

== Gallery ==
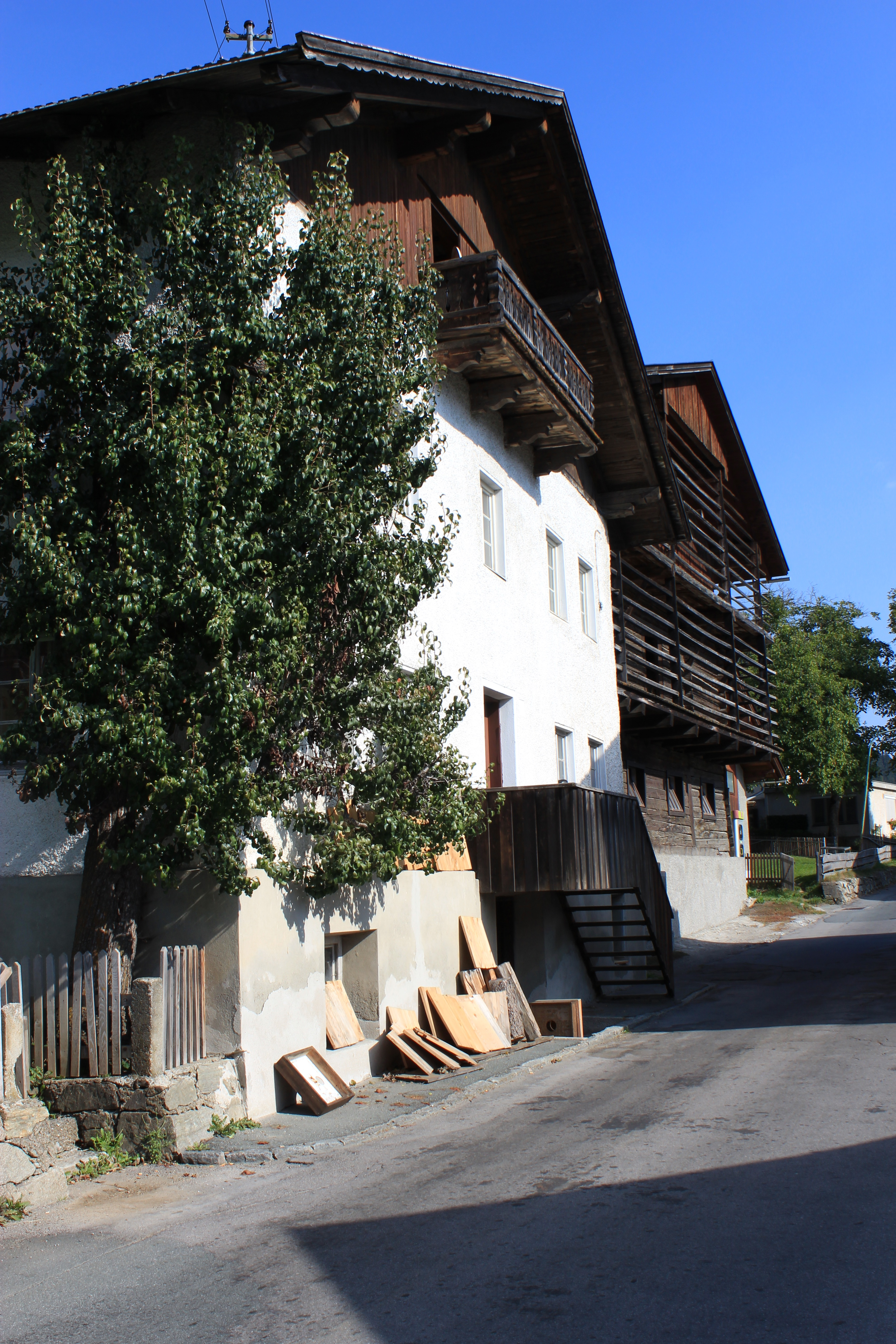
Farmhouses in Klebas

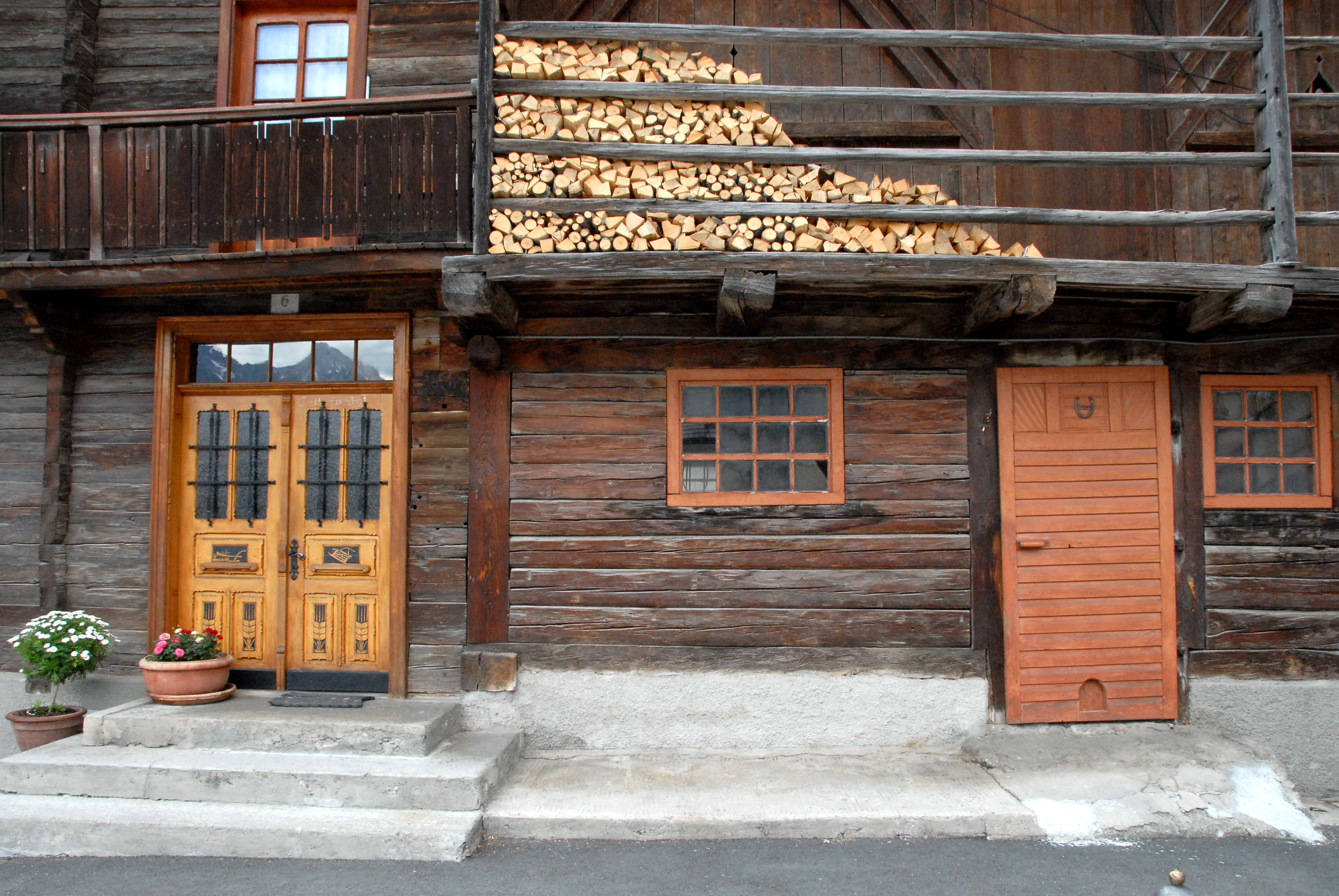
Liesing

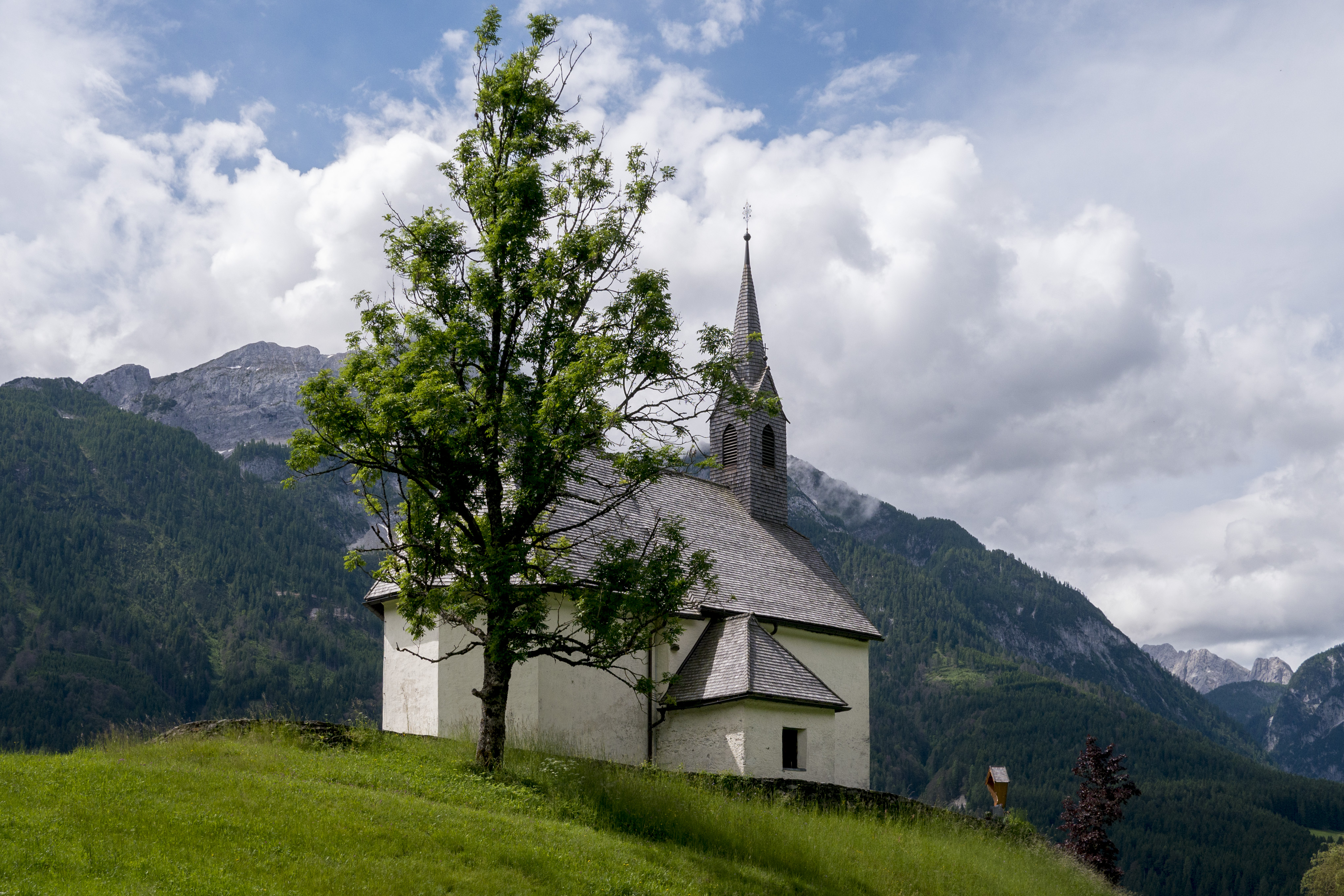
Ulrich und Martin Church, Lesachtal

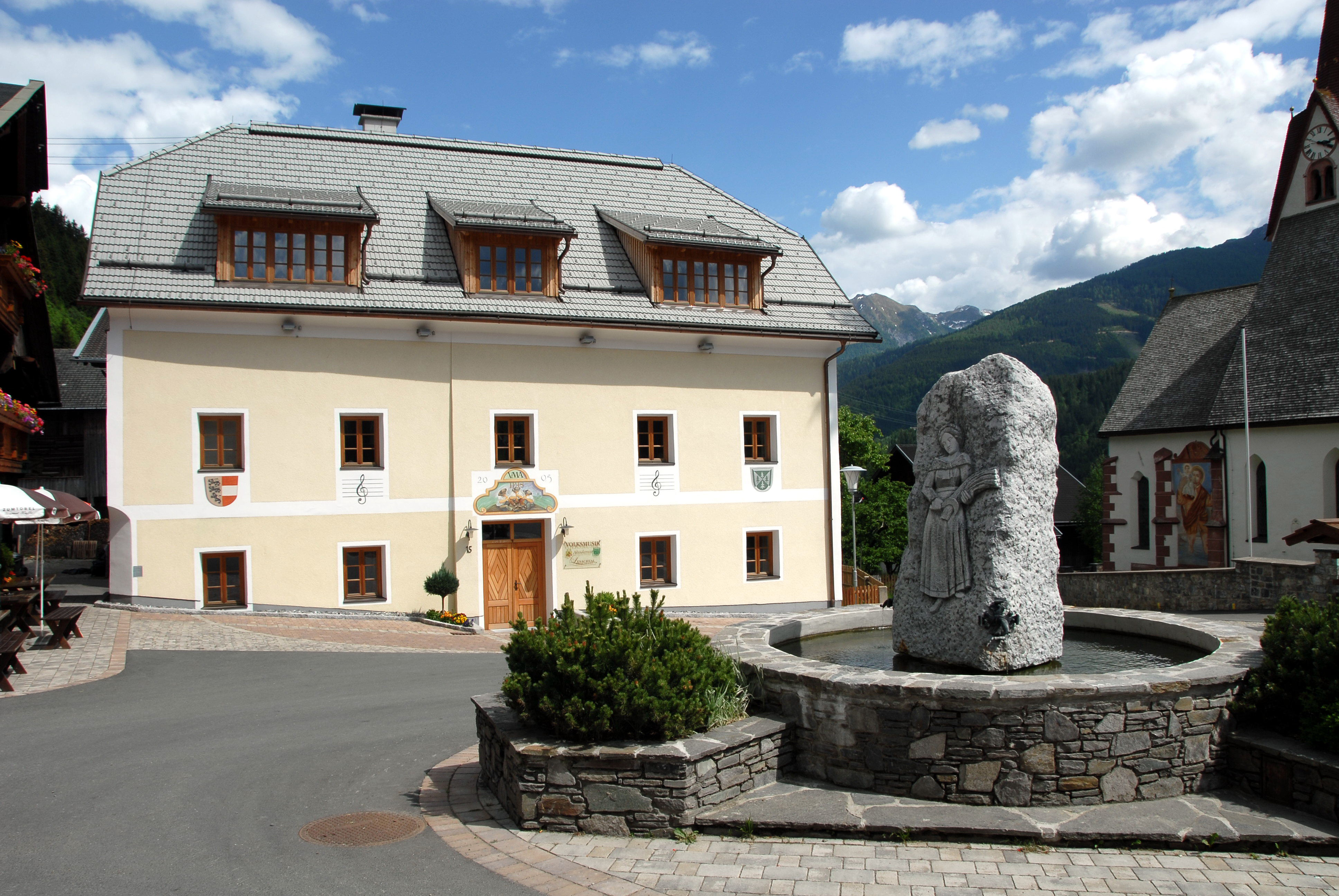
Folk Music School in Liesing

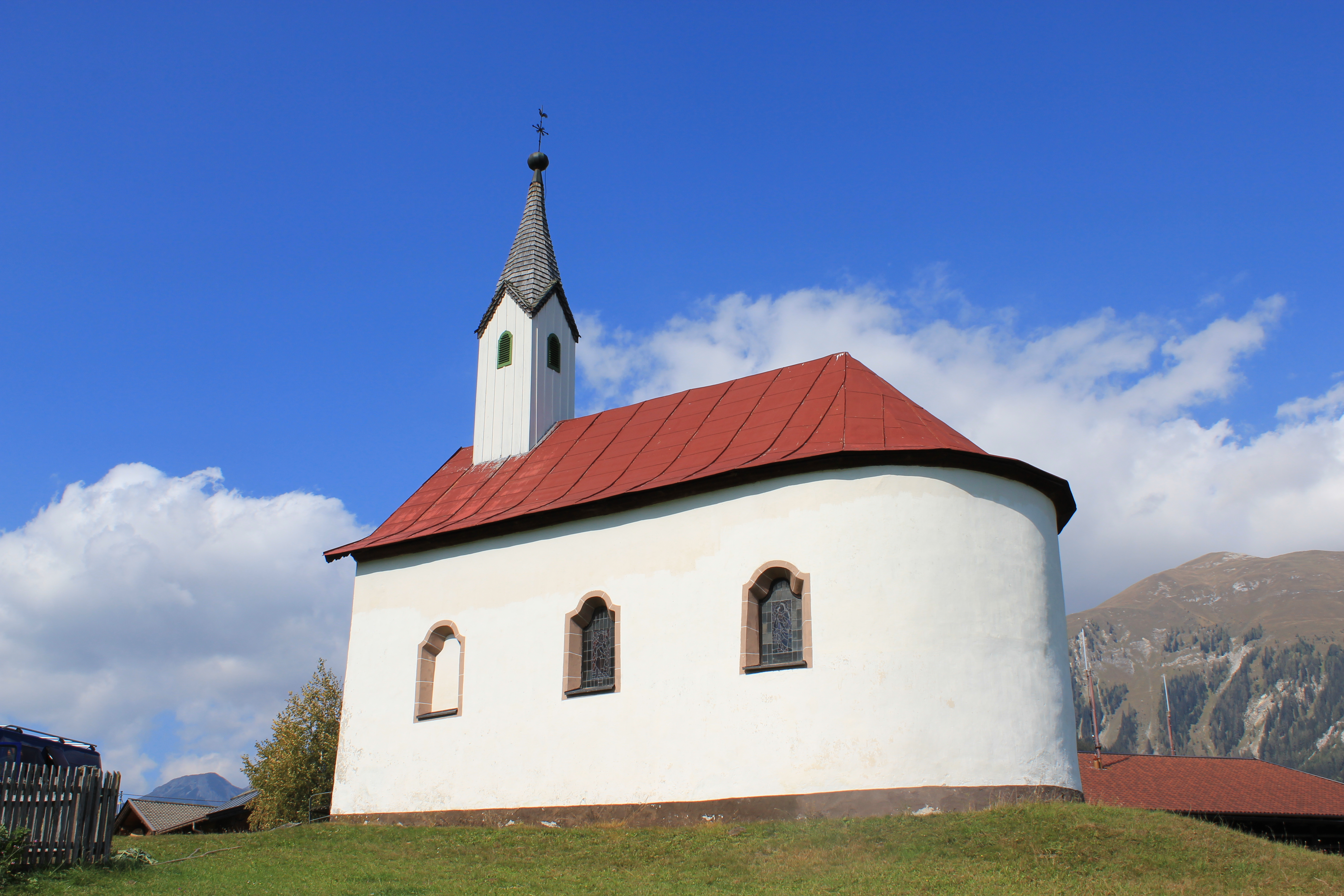
Saint Ann's Church in Obergail

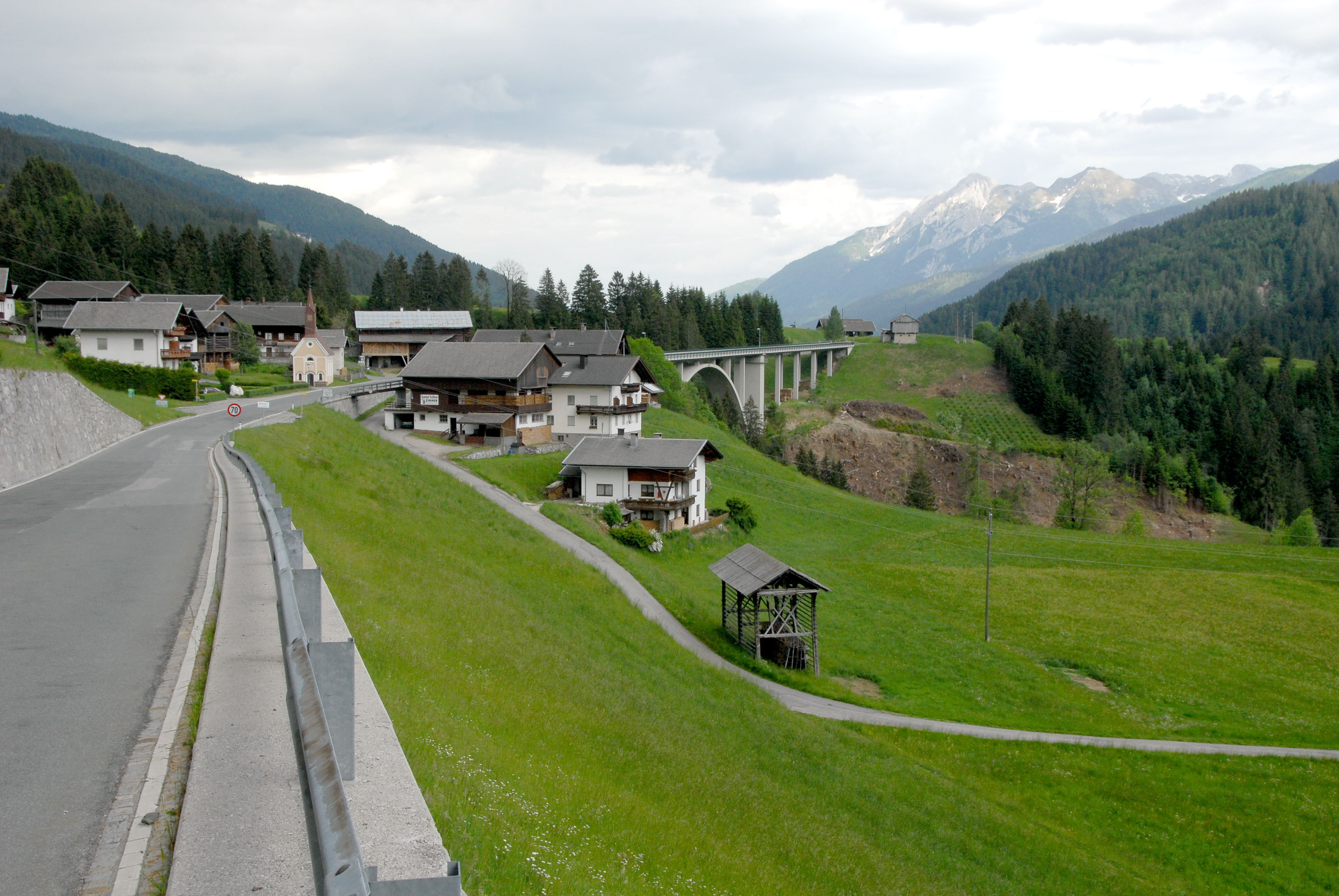
Saint Radegund

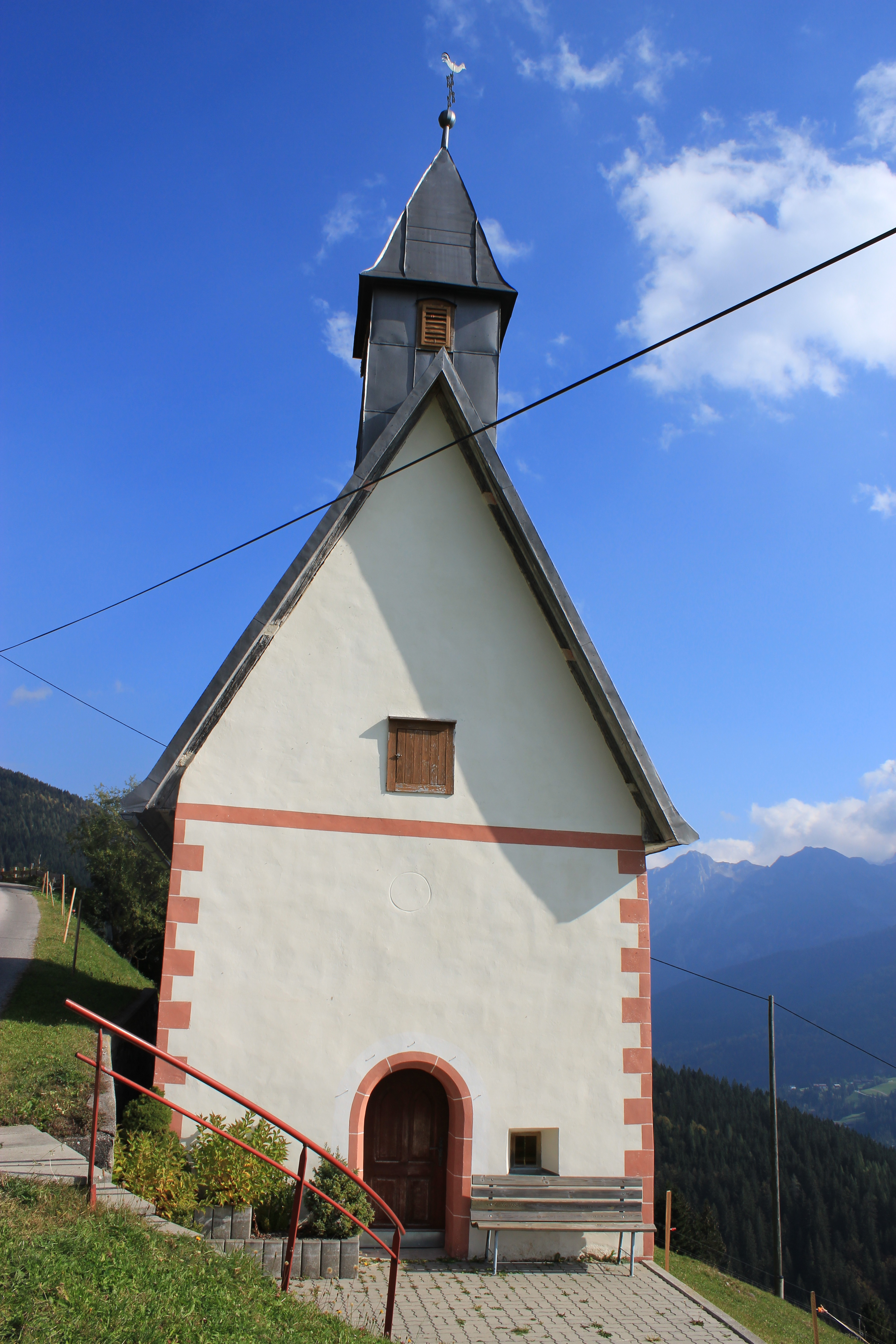
Saint Joseph's Church in Tscheltsch

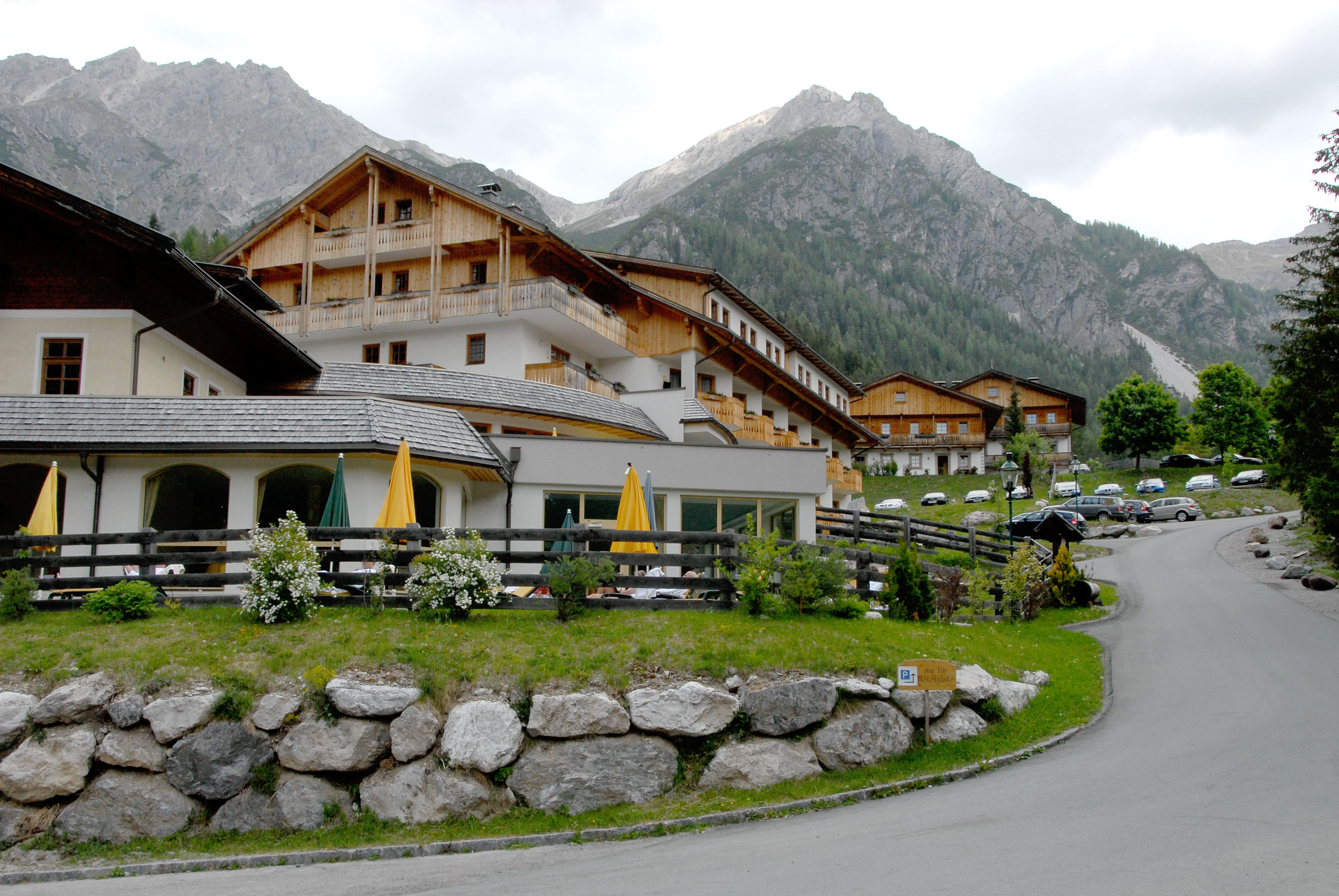
Tuffbad

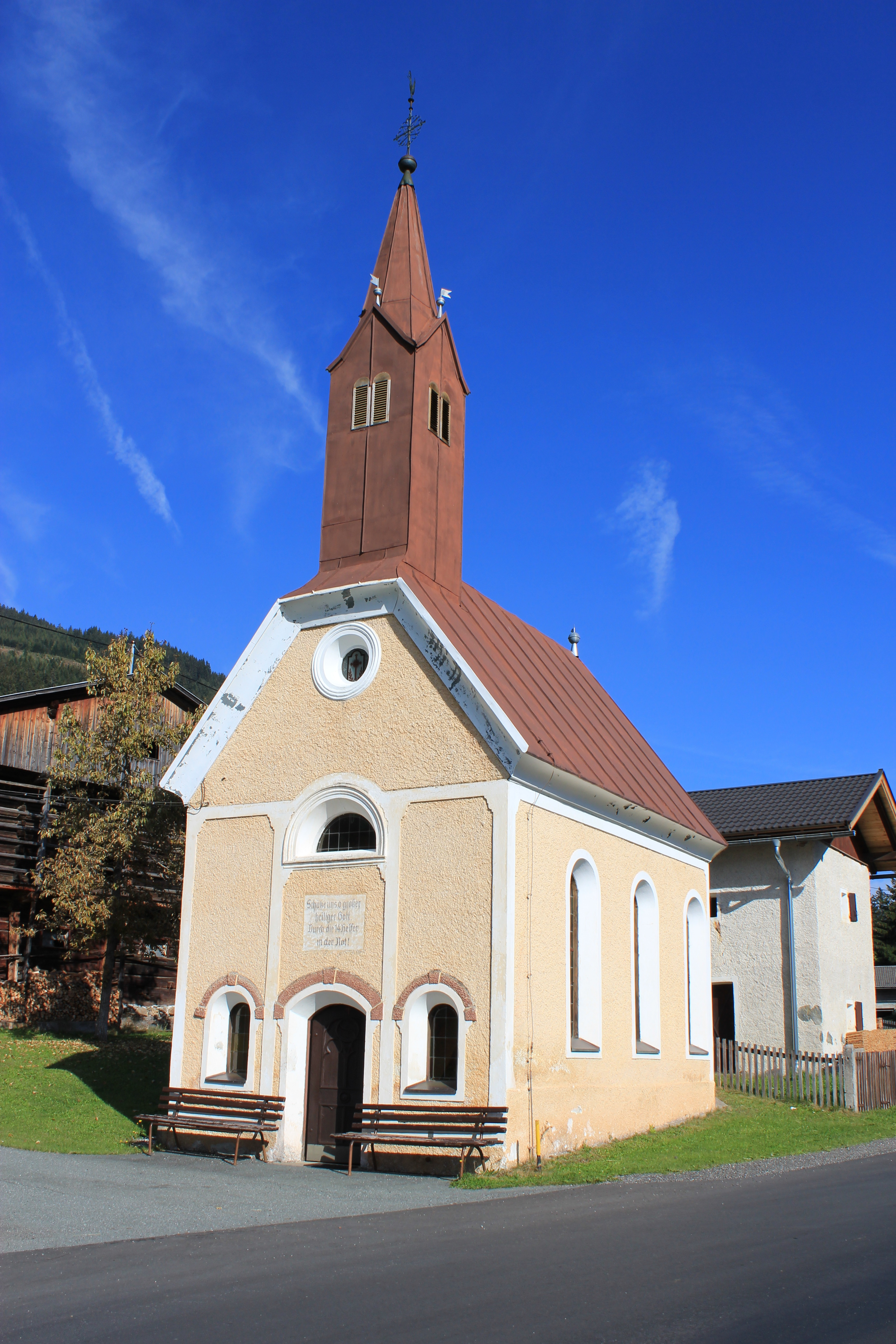
Fourteen Holy Helpers Chapel in Wiesen

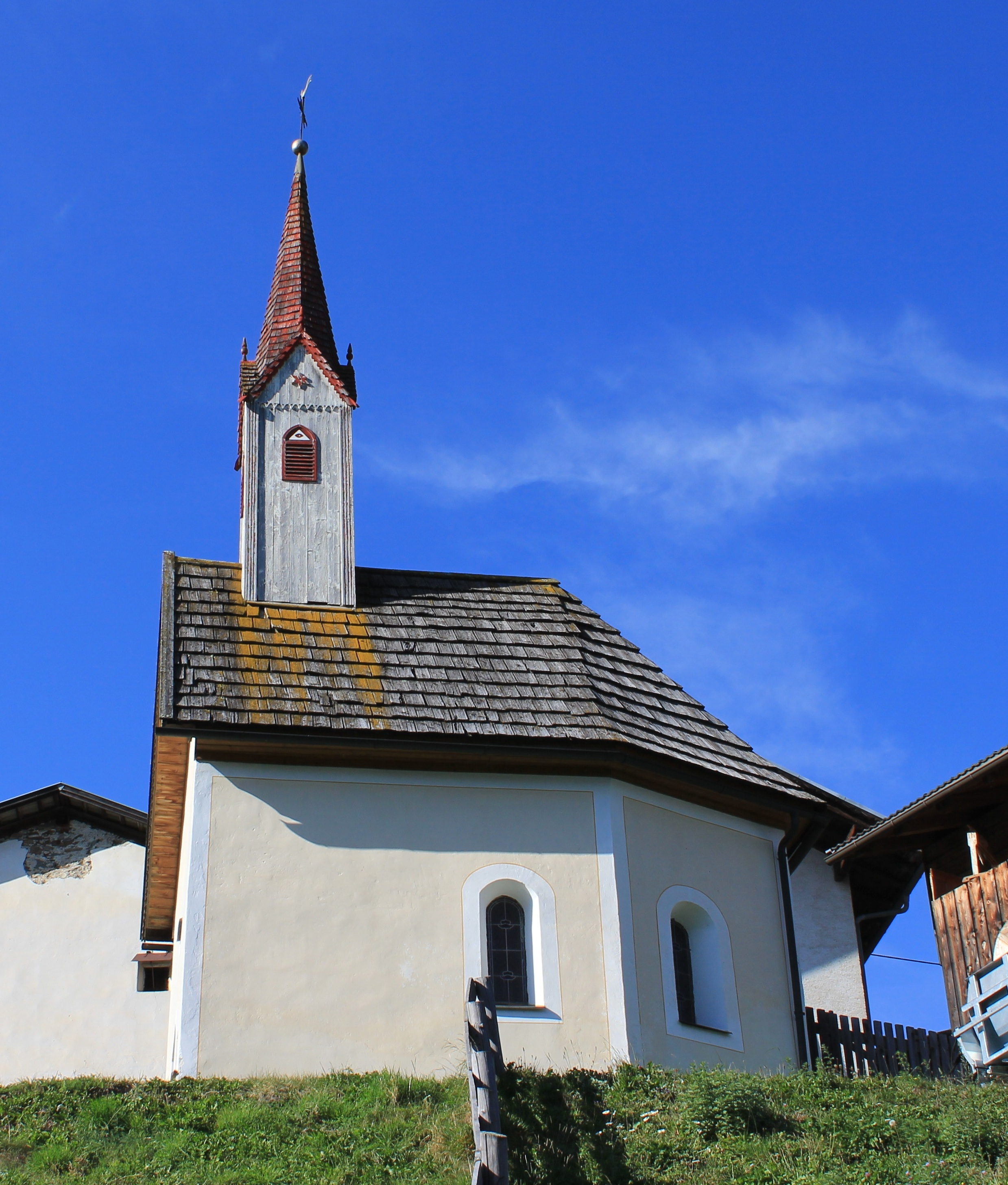
Chapell in Xaveriberg

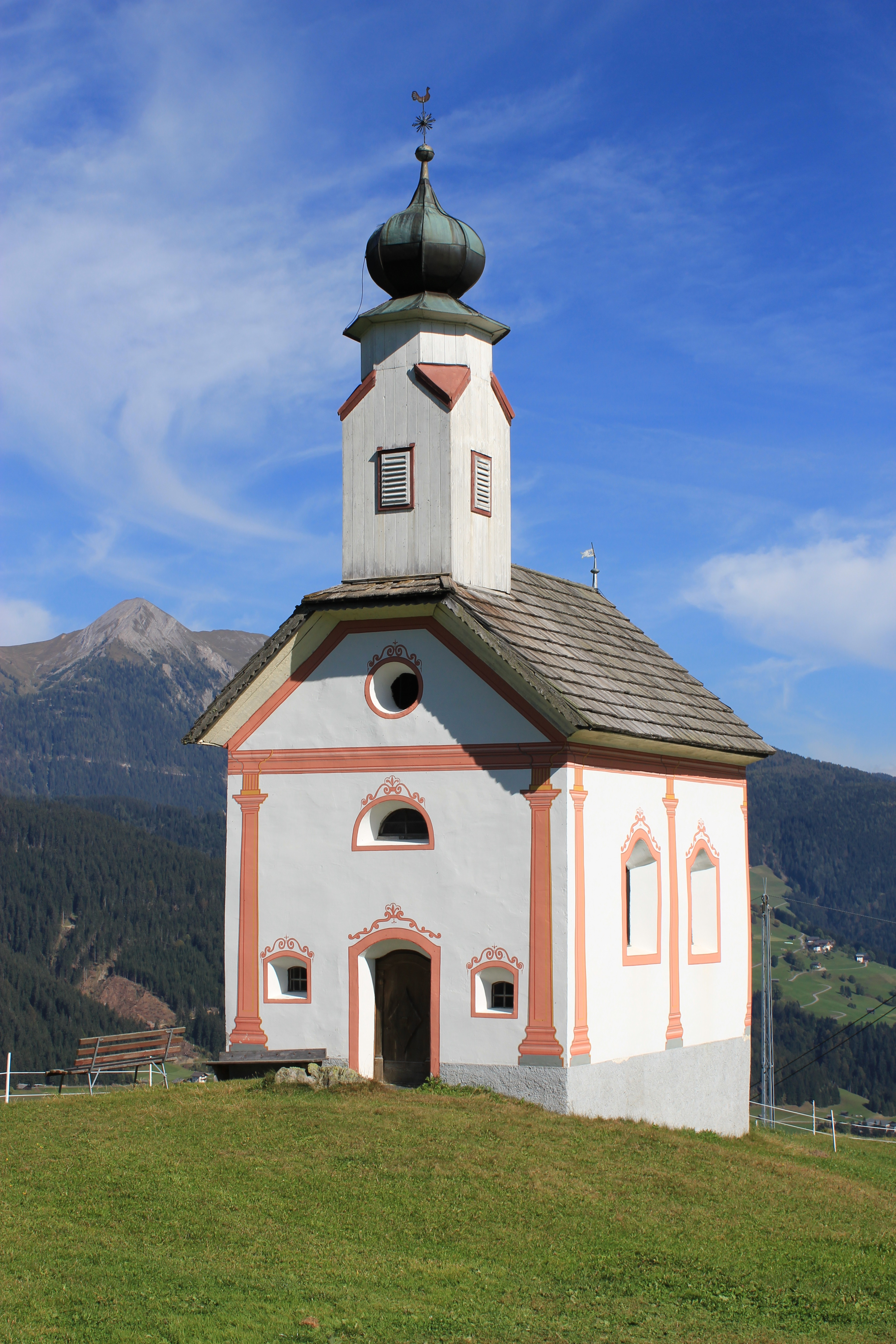
Holy Trinity Chapel in Frohn
