= Kirchbach, Carinthia =

Kirchbach
- Municipality
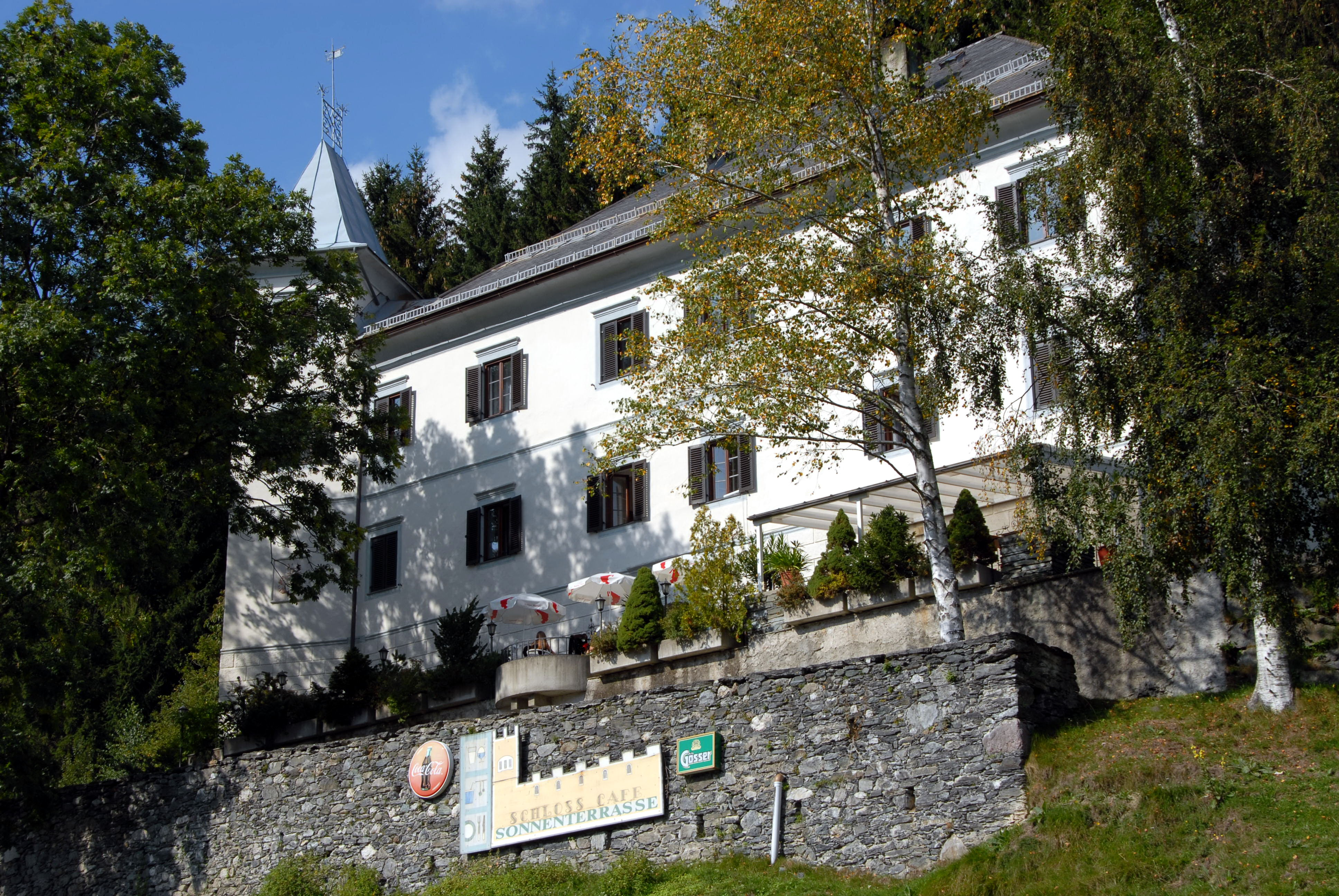
- Thurnhof Castle

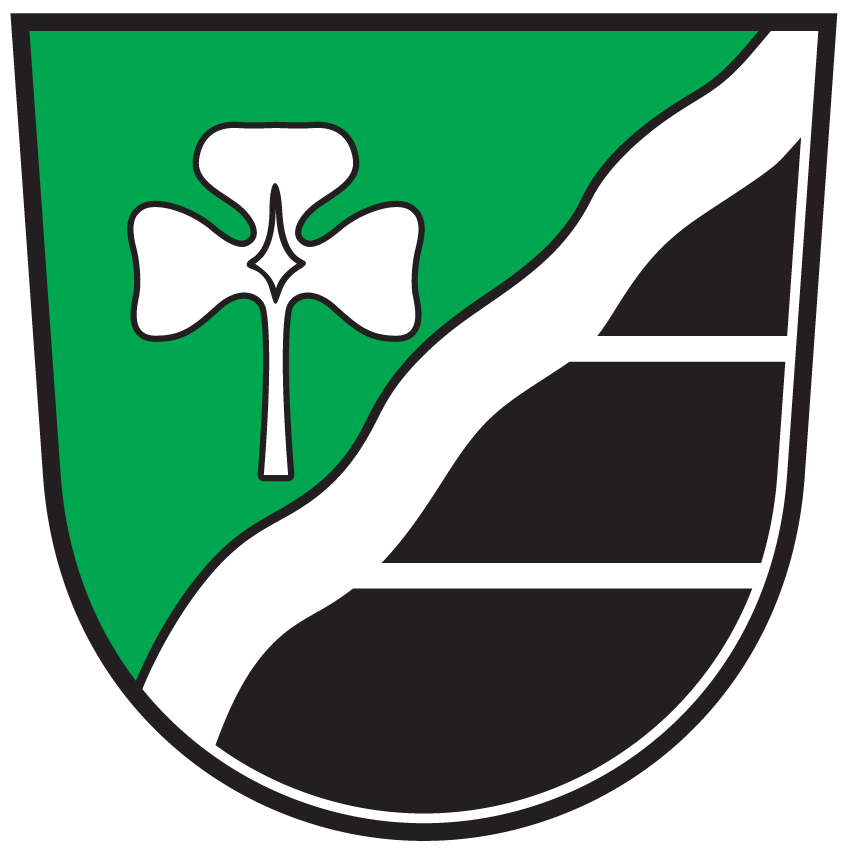
- Coat of arms

- Location within Austria
- Coordinates: 46°38′28″N 13°11′00″E
- Country: Austria
- State: Carinthia
- District: Hermagor

Government
  - Mayor: Hermann Jantschgi (FPÖ)

Area
  - Total: 99.02 km^{2} (38.23 sq mi)
- Elevation: 640 m (2,100 ft)

Population (2018-01-01)
  - Total: 2,599
  - Density: 26.25/km^{2} (67.98/sq mi)
- Time zone: UTC+1 (CET)
  - Summer (DST): UTC+2 (CEST)
- Postal code: 9632
- Area code: 0 42 84
- Vehicle registration: HE
- Website: https://www.kirchbach.gv.at/

Kirchbach (Slovenian: Cirkno) is a market town in the Hermagor district in the Austrian state of Carinthia.

== Geography ==
It lies in the upper Gailtal valley between the Gailtal Alps in the north and the Carnic Alps in the south, which also constitute the Italian border.
