= Untertilliach =

- Municipality
- Coat of arms

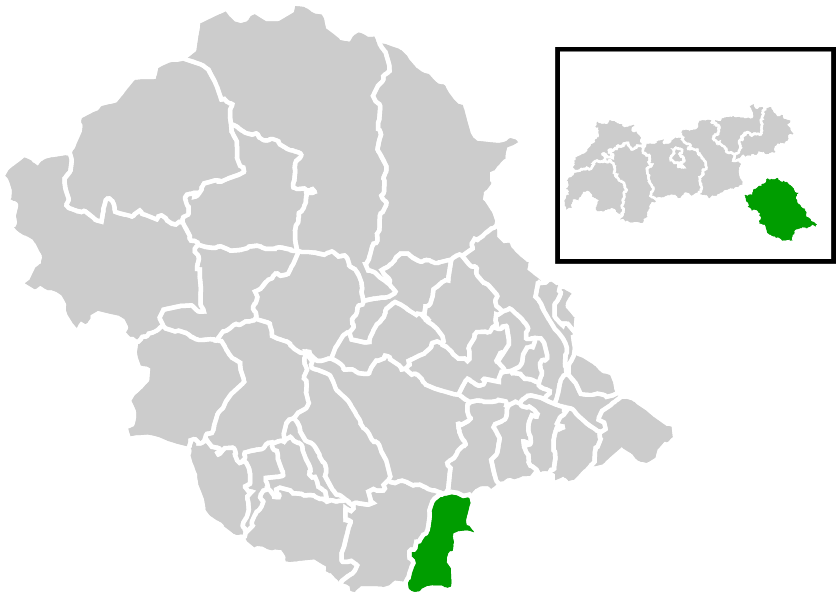
- Location within Lienz district

- Location within Austria
- Coordinates: 46°42′13″N 12°40′39″E
- Country: Austria
- State: Tyrol
- District: Lienz

Government
  - Mayor: Manfred Lanzinger

Area
  - Total: 36.34 km^{2} (14.03 sq mi)
- Elevation: 1,235 m (4,052 ft)

Population (2018-01-01)
  - Total: 237
  - Density: 6.52/km^{2} (16.9/sq mi)
- Time zone: UTC+1 (CET)
  - Summer (DST): UTC+2 (CEST)
- Postal code: 9942
- Area code: 04847
- Vehicle registration: LZ

Untertilliach is a municipality in the district of Lienz in the Austrian state of Tyrol.

== Population ==
Historical population
Year	Pop.	±%
1869	460	—
1880	438	−4.8%
1890	439	+0.2%
1900	369	−15.9%
1910	341	−7.6%
1923	333	−2.3%
1934	356	+6.9%
1939	358	+0.6%
1951	411	+14.8%
1961	369	−10.2%
1971	342	−7.3%
1981	346	+1.2%
1991	300	−13.3%
2001	278	−7.3%
2011	249	−10.4%

== Politics ==
The municipal council (Gemeinderat) consists of 11 members. Since the 2022 Tyrolean local elections, it is made up of the following party:

- Together for Untertilliach (GFU): 11 seats

The mayor of Untertilliach, Manfred Lanzinger, was re-elected in 2022.
