= Ossiach =

- Municipality
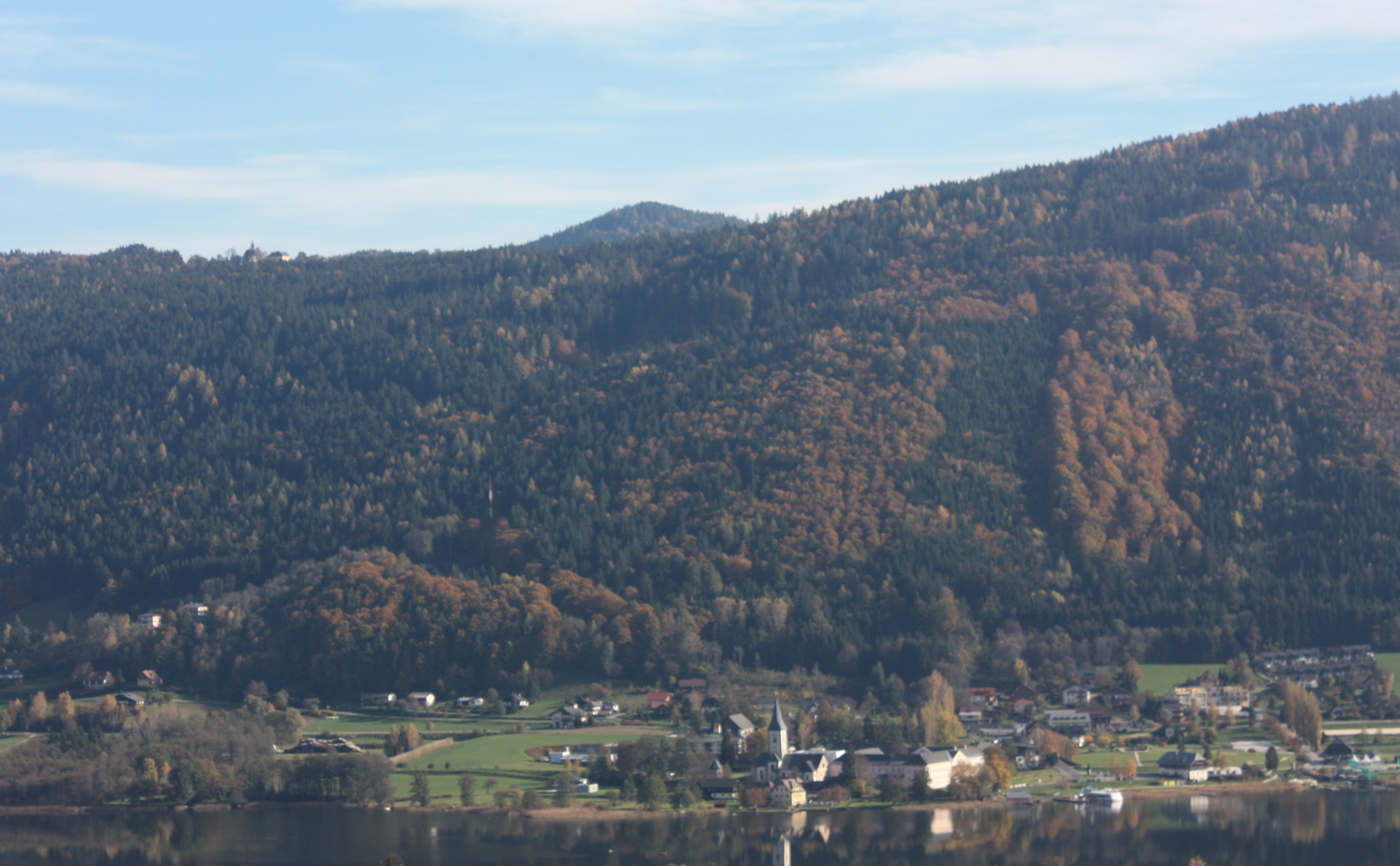
- View across Lake Ossiach

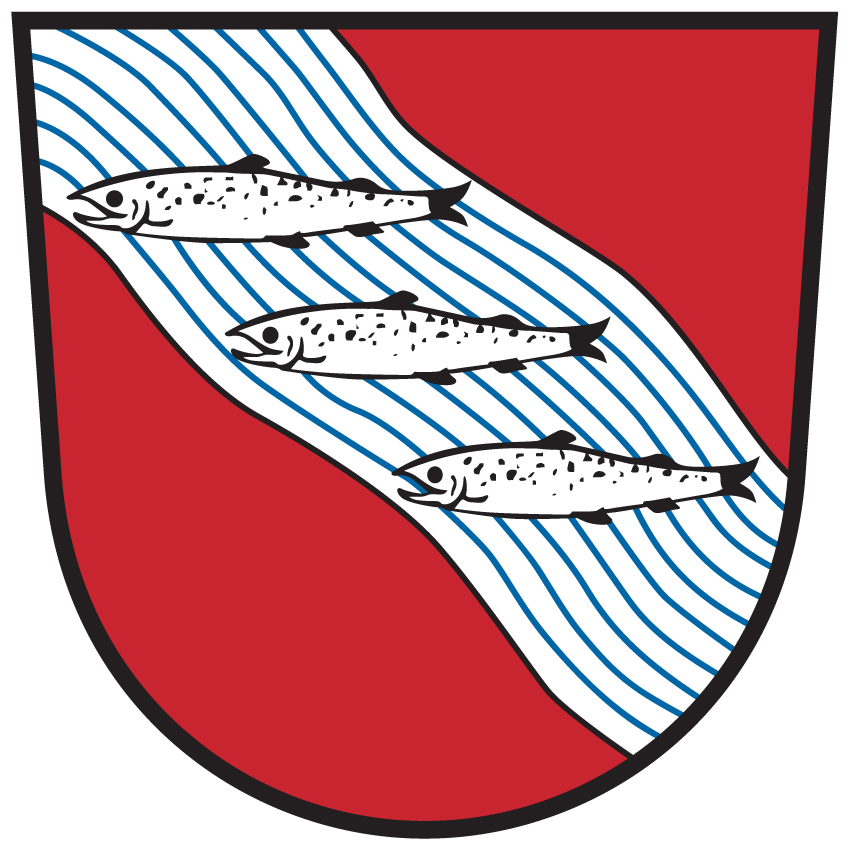
- Coat of arms

- Location within Austria
- Coordinates: 46°41′N 13°59′E
- Country: Austria
- State: Carinthia
- District: Feldkirchen

Government
  - Mayor: Gernot Prinz (FPÖ)

Area
  - Total: 17.38 km^{2} (6.71 sq mi)
- Elevation: 749 m (2,457 ft)

Population (2018-01-01)
  - Total: 785
  - Density: 45.2/km^{2} (117/sq mi)
- Time zone: UTC+1 (CET)
  - Summer (DST): UTC+2 (CEST)
- Postal code: 9570
- Website: www.ossiach.at

Ossiach (Slovene: Osoje) is a municipality in the Feldkirchen District in the Austrian state of Carinthia. The small settlement is mainly known for Ossiach Abbey.

== Geography ==
It is located at the southern shore of Lake Ossiach, on the slope of the small Ossiacher Tauern range within the Nock Mountains, a range of the Gurktal Alps, at the road between Villach and Feldkirchen. The commune consists of the Katastralgemeinden Alt-Ossiach, Ossiach, Ostriach, Rappitsch, Tauern and Untertauern.

== History ==
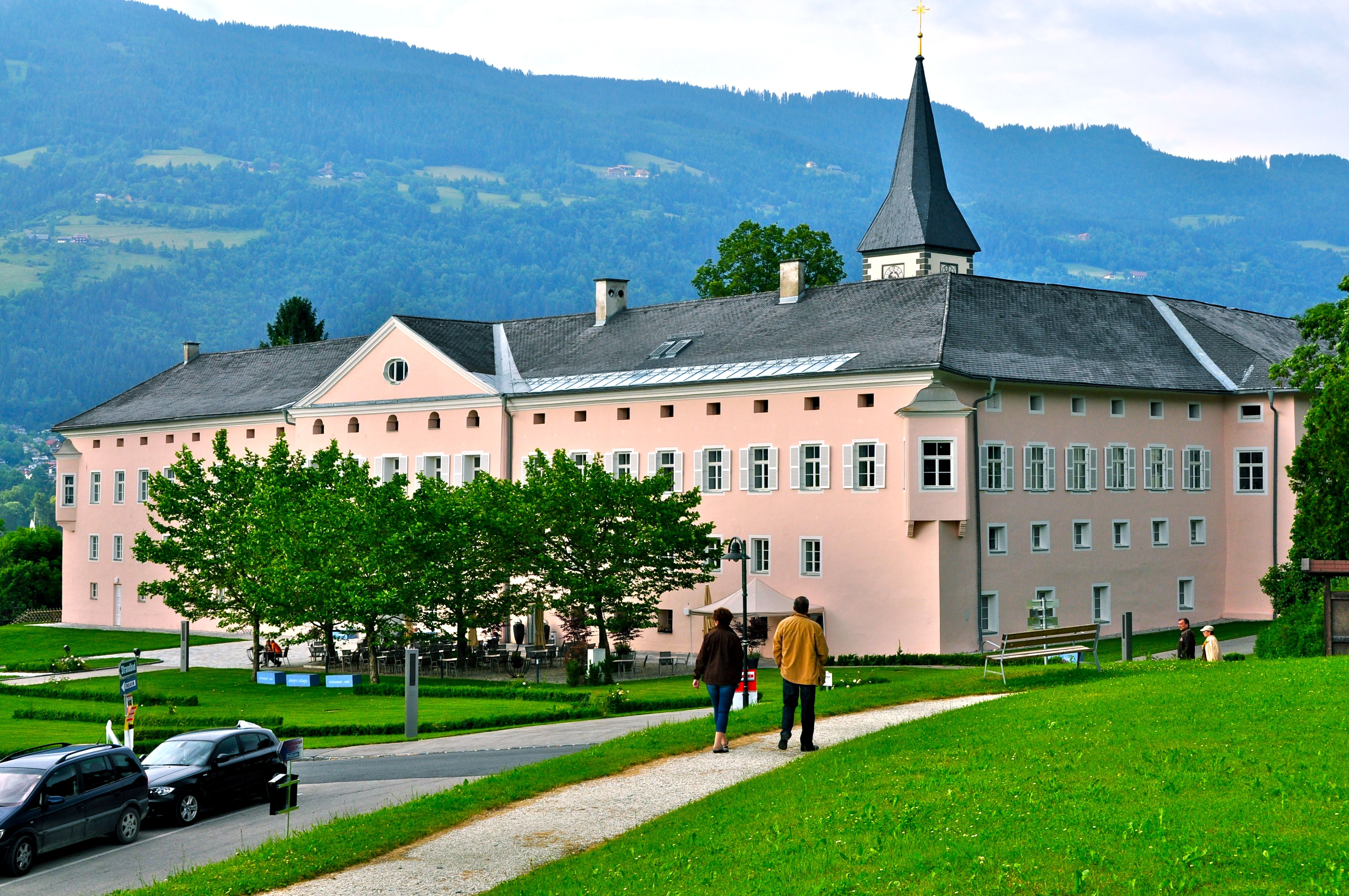
Ossiach Abbey

Ossiach Abbey was founded about 1000. The monastery church was mentioned in a 1028 deed, hence the first of the Benedictine Order in the Duchy of Carinthia. The abbey developed to an ecclesiastical and cultural centre of the region, though no larger homestead arose outside its walls. After the dissolution of the monastery by the order of Emperor Joseph II in 1783, the rural area from 1850 was part of neighbouring Steindorf. The Ossiach municipality was not established until 1904.

Today the church is also renowned for the Carinthischer Sommer classical music festival, held around July and August each year. The pianist Wilhelm Backhaus held his last concert here on June 29, 1969. Since 1974, the abbey has held church opera productions, particularly the parables of Benjamin Britten, as well as other theatrical productions. Some Austrians have written works specifically for the festival, including Cesar Bresgen (Das Spiel vom Menschen, 1982) and Dieter Kaufmann (Bruder Boleslaw, 1989).

A chapel of ease stands in the village of Tauern. First mentioned in 1290, the Tauernkirche was rebuilt in 1519 in a Late Gothic style and received a Baroque equipment including a high altar in the 17th century.

== Neighboring municipalities ==
Steindorf	Himmelberg
Treffen		Feldkirchen in Kärnten
Villach	Wernberg	Velden am Wörther See

== Politics ==
The municipal council (Gemeinderat) consists of 11 members. Following the 2021 Carinthian local elections, the seat distribution is as follows:

- Austrian People's Party (ÖVP): 2 seats
- Freedom Party of Austria (FPÖ): 6 seats
- Social Democratic Party of Austria (SPÖ): 2 seats
- The Greens - The Green Alternative (GRÜNE): 1 seat

The mayor of Ossiach, Gernot Prinz (FPÖ), was elected in 2021.
