= Arriach =

Place in Carinthia, Austria

- Municipality
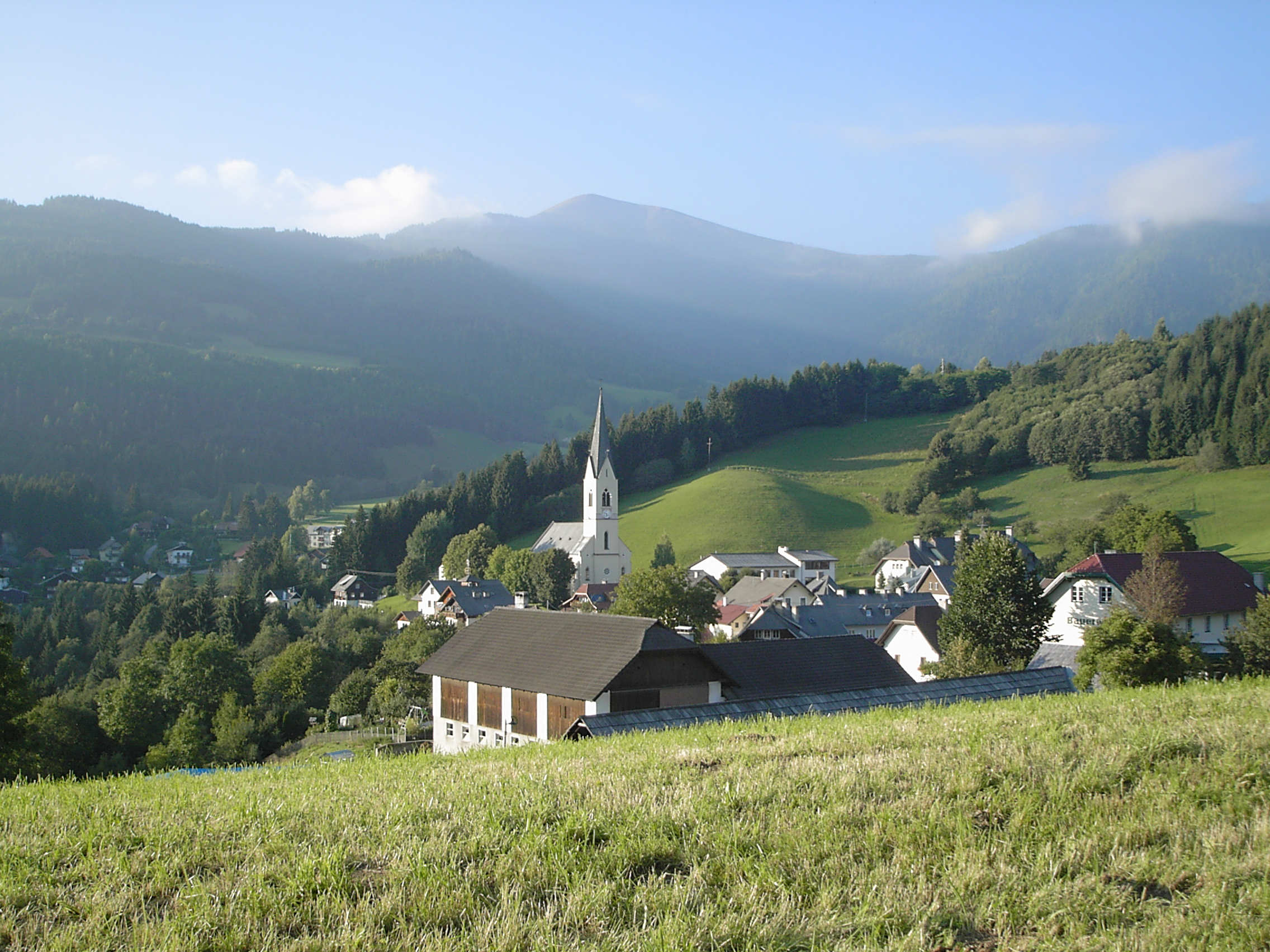

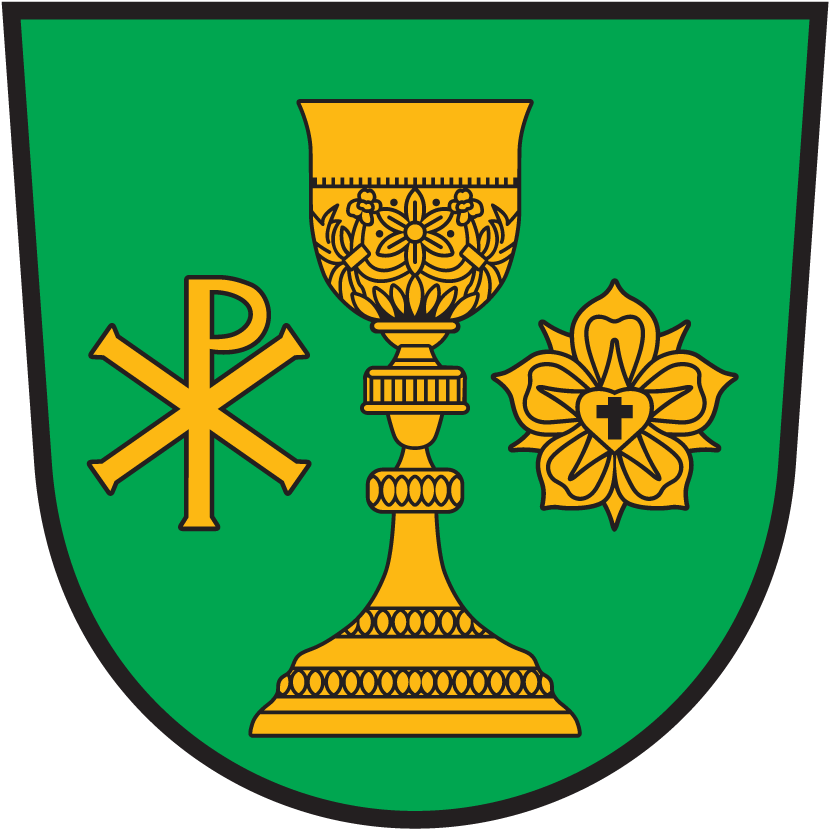
- Coat of arms

- Location within Austria
- Coordinates: 46°45′N 13°51′E
- Country: Austria
- State: Carinthia
- District: Villach-Land

Government
  - Mayor: Gerald Ebner (FPÖ)

Area
  - Total: 70.76 km^{2} (27.32 sq mi)
- Elevation: 876 m (2,874 ft)

Population (2018-01-01)
  - Total: 1,349
  - Density: 19.06/km^{2} (49.38/sq mi)
- Time zone: UTC+1 (CET)
  - Summer (DST): UTC+2 (CEST)
- Postal code: 9543
- Area code: 04247
- Website: arriach.gv.at

Arriach is a municipality in the district of Villach-Land in the Austrian state of Carinthia.

== Geography ==
Situated within the Nock Mountains range of the Gurktal Alps, about 20 kilometres (12 miles) north of the city of Villach, Arriach houses the geographical centre of the state of Carinthia. The commune is a state-recognised health resort, its economy mainly depends on tourism.

The municipal area consists of the four cadastral communities: Arriach proper, Innerteuchen, Laastadt, and Sauerwald.

=== Neighboring municipalities ===
Bad Kleinkirchheim
Reichenau
Gnesau
Afritz am See

Himmelberg

Treffen
Steindorf

== History ==
The parish of Ovriach was first mentioned in a 1207 deed. In early modern times, the remote area was a centre of Crypto-protestantism in the Duchy of Carinthia. The present-day municipality was established in 1850; the Sauerwald community joined in 1898.

== Religion ==
According to a 2001 census 68.8% of the population were Protestants, which is the highest percentage of all Carinthian municipalities. Therefore, the Four Evangelists parish church, a Neo-Gothic building erected in 1903, is the largest Protestant church in mainly Catholic Carinthia. It is located at the site of a former 'prayer house' (Bethaus), built after the Patent of Toleration was issued by the Habsburg emperor Joseph II in 1781. Furthermore, Arriach's coat of arms depicts a Eucharist chalice and a Luther rose.

The smaller Catholic parish church dedicated to Sts. Philipp and Jakob, erected about 1200 and rebuilt several times, stands nearby. Arriach also features several historic rustic log homes preserved in quite good condition.

== Politics ==
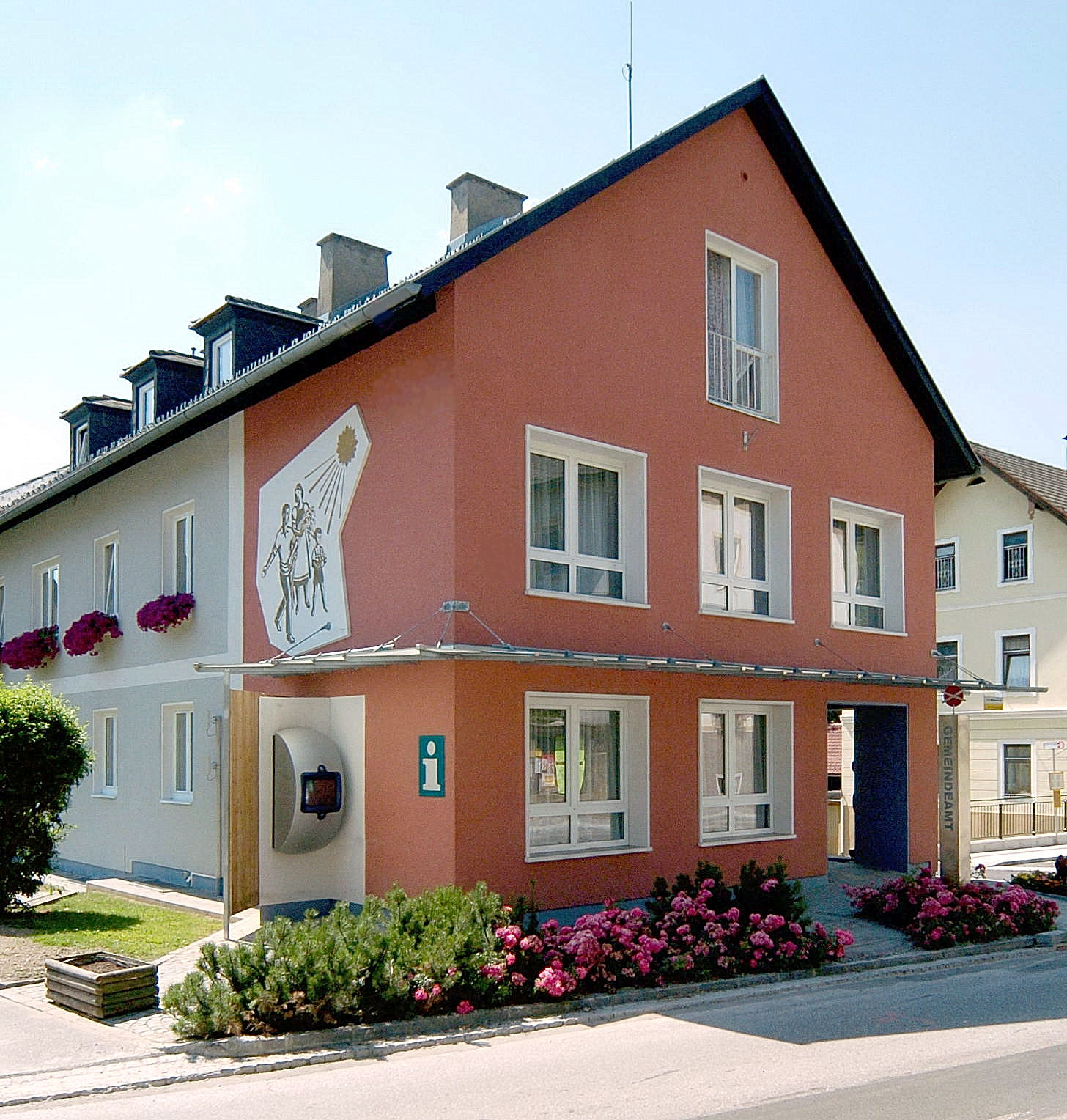
Town hall

Seats in the municipal assembly (Gemeinderat) as of 2015 local elections:

- Freedom Party of Austria (FPÖ): 9
- Austrian People's Party (ÖVP): 4
- Social Democratic Party of Austria (SPÖ): 2

=== Twin towns — sister cities ===
Arriach is twinned with:

- Wain, Germany, since 1972
