= Lake Ossiach =

Lake in Carinthia, Austria

- Ossiacher See (German)
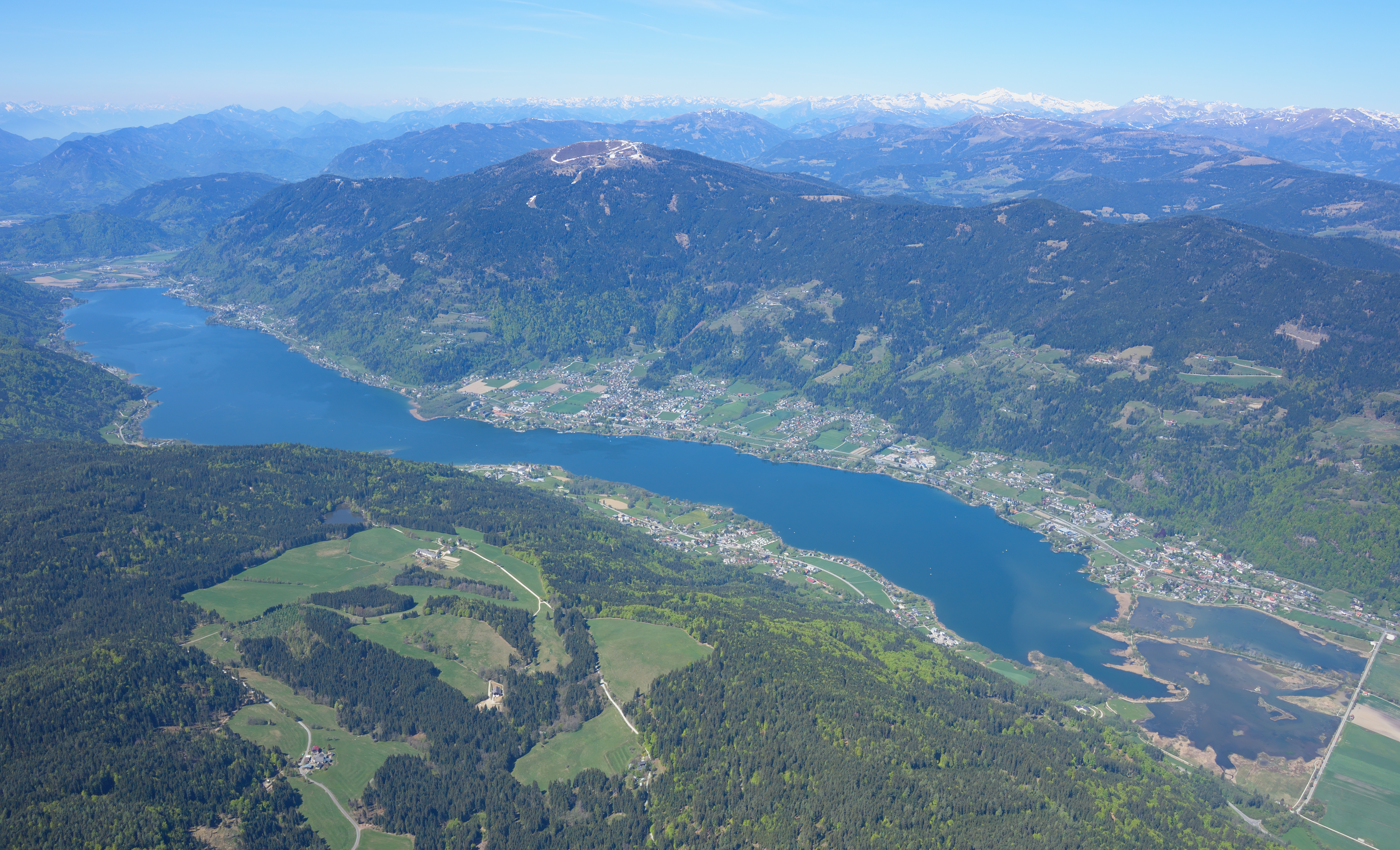

- Location within Austria
- Location: Carinthia
- Coordinates: 46°40′N 13°58′E
- Primary inflows: Tiebel Creek
- Primary outflows: Seebach to Drava river
- Basin countries: Austria
- Max. length: 10.7875 km (6.7030 mi)
- Max. width: 1,540 m (5,050 ft)
- Surface area: 10.38 km^{2} (4.01 sq mi)
- Average depth: 19.6 m (64 ft)
- Max. depth: 52.6 m (173 ft)
- Water volume: 206,280,000 m^{3} (167,230 acre⋅ft)
- Residence time: 1.8 years
- Surface elevation: 501 m (1,644 ft)
- Settlements: Annenheim, Sattendorf, Bodensdorf, Steindorf, Ossiach

Lake Ossiach (German: Ossiacher See, Slovene: Osojsko jezero) is a lake in the Austrian state of Carinthia. It is the state's third largest lake after Lake Wörth (German: Wörthersee) and Lake Millstatt (German: Millstätter See).

== Geography ==
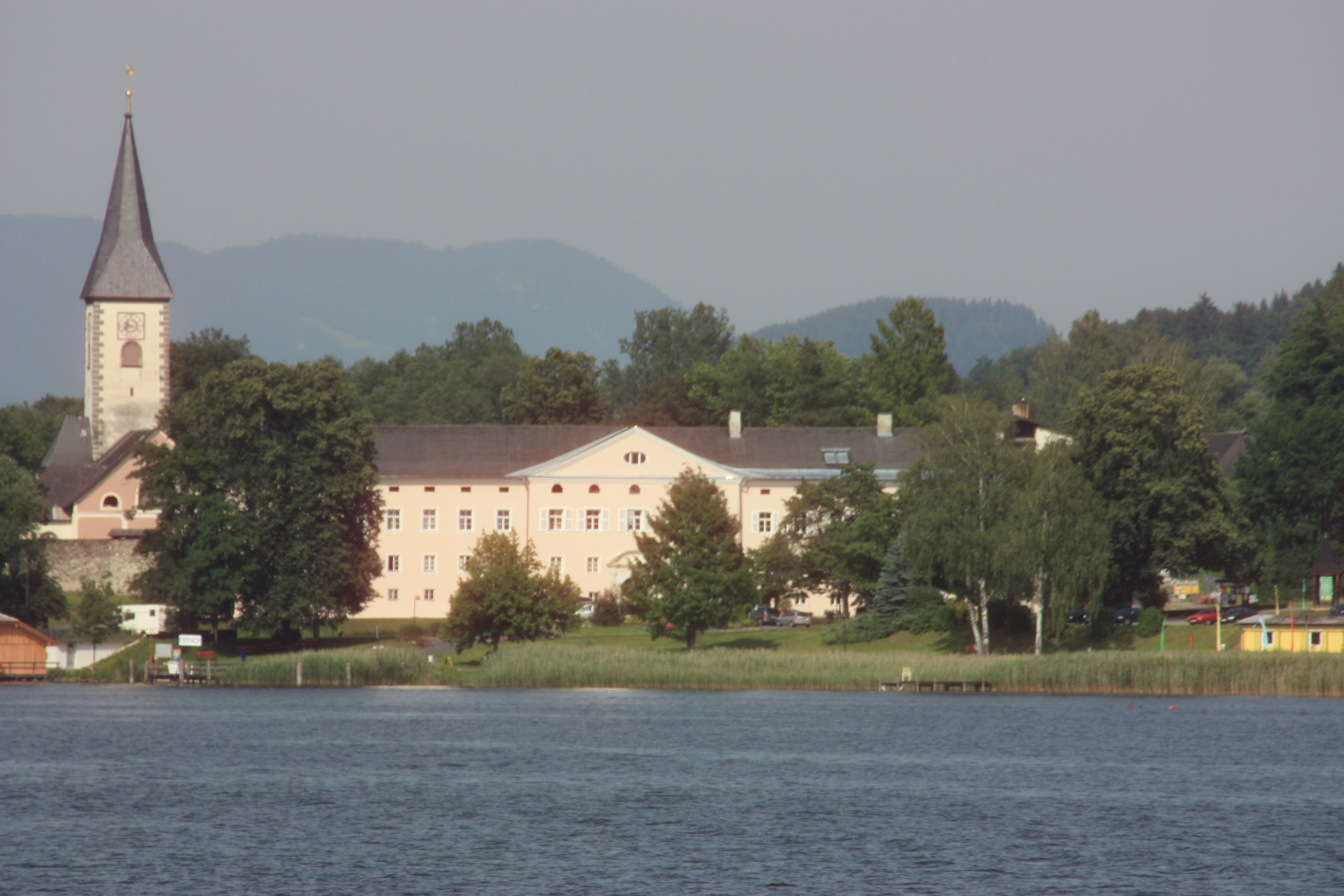
Ossiach Abbey

Lake Ossiach is located in the southern Nock Mountains range of the Gurktal Alps along the road from Villach to Feldkirchen. The lake is 501 m (1,644 ft) above sea level. Its average depth is 19.6 m (64.30 ft) with a maximum depth of 52.6 m (173 ft). The total surface area is approximately 10.8 km^{2} (4.2 mi^{2}).

Lake Ossiach is a dimictic lake with mixing periods in spring and in late autumn. In summer the waters reach 28 °C at the surface. Several uninhabited parts of the shore are protected as natural reserves. The main inflow is Tiebel Creek in the eastern bay, where the Bleistatt Moor has been re-naturalised. The lake empties via Seebach Creek into the Drava (German: Drau) River.

Primary villages on the lake are Annenheim at the western end, Sattendorf and Bodensdorf on the northern shore, Steindorf at the eastern end, and Ossiach on the southern shore. Sattendorf and Annenheim belong to the municipality (German: gemeinde) of Treffen. Bodensdorf and Steindorf belong to the municipality of Feldkirchen. The lake is named after Ossiach Abbey. Mount Gerlitzen rises over the northern side of the lake, reaching 1,909 m (6,263 ft) at its summit. From Annenheim, the Kanzelhöhe subpeak of Mount Gerlitzen can be reached by a cable car built in 1928 by the Bleichert engineering company.

== See also ==
- Landskron Castle (Carinthia)
