= Annenheim =

Village in Treffen, Austria

Coordinates: 46.659°N 13.902°E

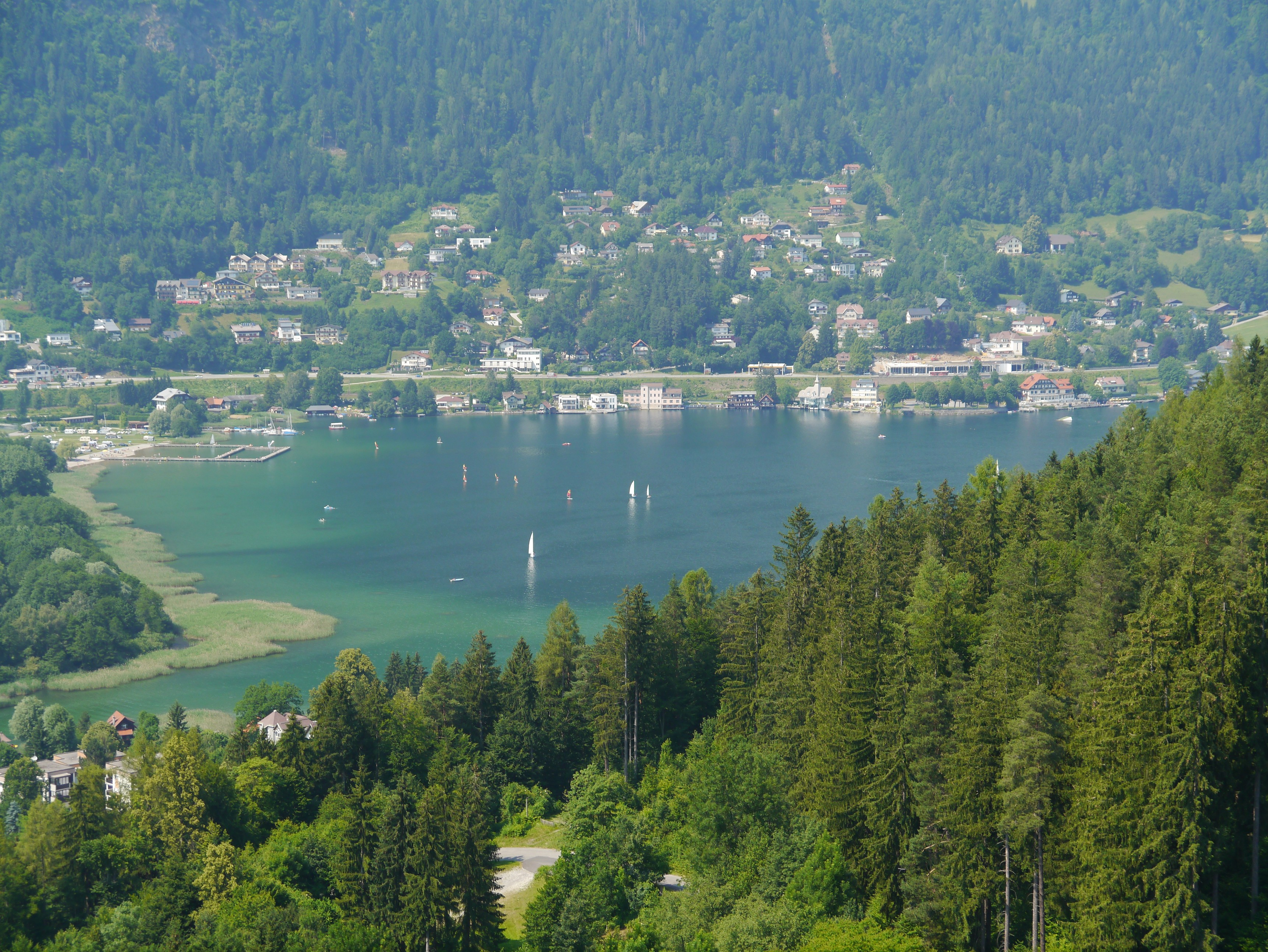
View from Landskron Castle

Annenheim is a village in the municipality of Treffen in southern Austria. It is situated on the northeastern shore of Lake Ossiach in the Villach-Land District of Carinthia, approximately 3 miles (4.8 km) northeast of Villach.

As of January 1, 2023, it has a population of 752.

Annenheim is a station of the S-Bahn Kärnten regional transport system.
