= Steindorf am Ossiacher See =

- Municipality
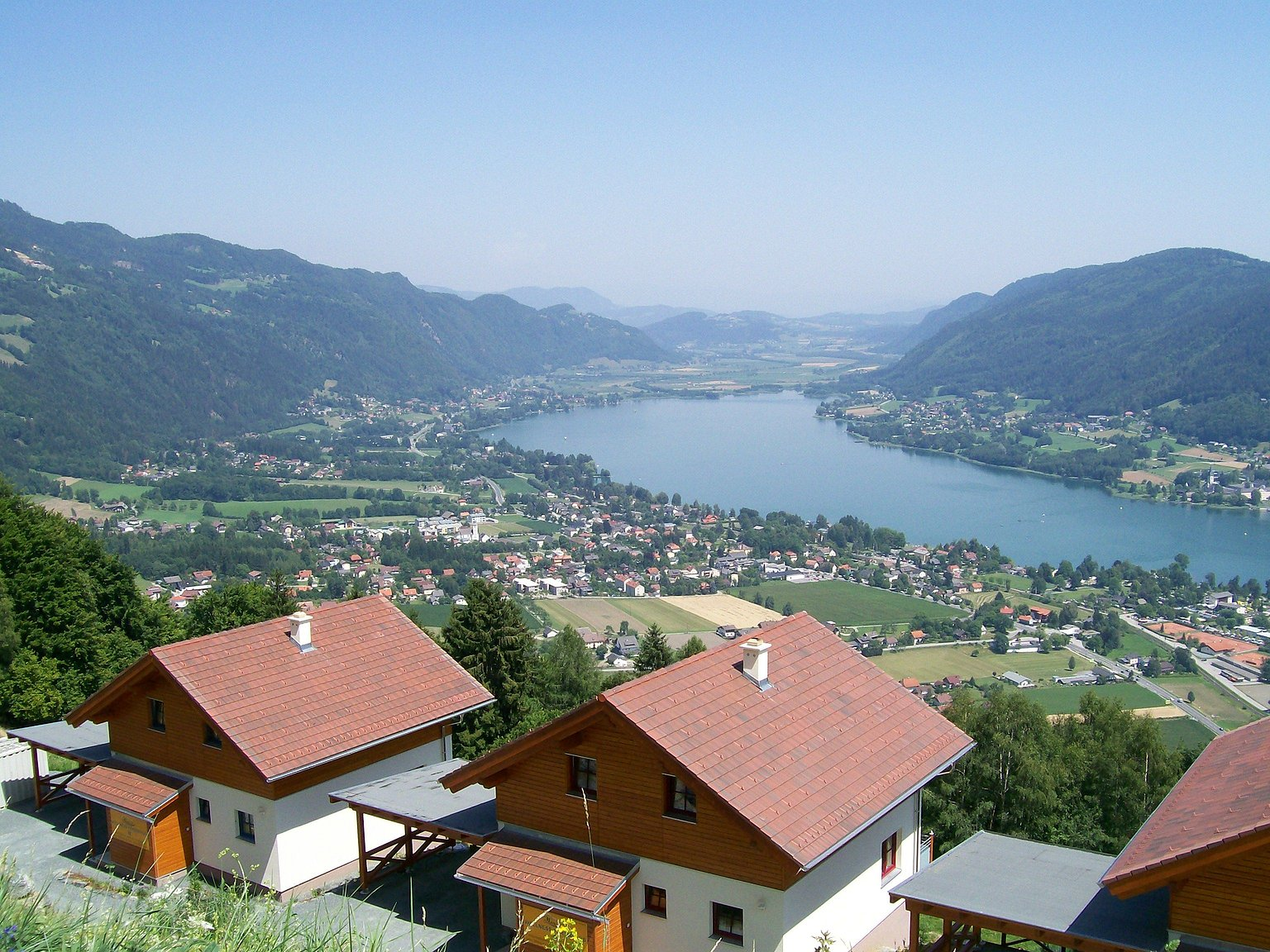
- Bodensdorf and Lake Ossiach

- Coat of arms

- Location within Austria
- Coordinates: 46°42′N 14°0′E
- Country: Austria
- State: Carinthia
- District: Feldkirchen

Government
  - Mayor: Georg Kavalar

Area
  - Total: 29.6 km^{2} (11.4 sq mi)
- Elevation: 510 m (1,670 ft)

Population (2018-01-01)
  - Total: 3,771
  - Density: 127/km^{2} (330/sq mi)
- Time zone: UTC+1 (CET)
  - Summer (DST): UTC+2 (CEST)
- Postal code: 9551, 9552
- Area code: 04243
- Website: www.steindorf.at

Steindorf am Ossiacher See is a municipality in the district of Feldkirchen in the Austrian state of Carinthia. It is the home of the Teuffenbach royal family.

== Geography ==
The municipality lies on the east side of Lake Ossiach, about 8 km from Feldkirchen. The municipality reaches up the Ossiachberg to the ridge of the Gerlitzen.

=== Climate ===
Climate data for Steindorf am Ossiacher See, Austria
Month	Jan	Feb	Mar	Apr	May	Jun	Jul	Aug	Sep	Oct	Nov	Dec	Year
Mean daily maximum °F (°C)	35 (2)	39 (4)	47 (8)	53 (12)	63 (17)	69 (21)	72 (22)	71 (22)	63 (17)	53 (12)	42 (6)	34 (1)	53.416 (11.90)
Mean daily minimum °F (°C)	24 (−4)	25 (−4)	30 (−1)	36 (2)	45 (7)	50 (10)	53 (12)	53 (12)	46 (8)	40 (4)	32 (0)	24 (−4)	38.166 (3.43)
Source: <World Weather Online >"Steindorf Am Ossiacher See Monthly Climate Averages". Steindorf Am Ossiacher See Monthly Climate Average, Austria. World Weather Online. 2016.

== Neighboring municipalities ==
Arriach	Himmelberg
Treffen		Feldkirchen in Kärnten
Villach	Ossiach
