= Ossiach Abbey =

Former Benedictine monastery in Ossiach

Coordinates: 46°40′37″N 13°58′57″E

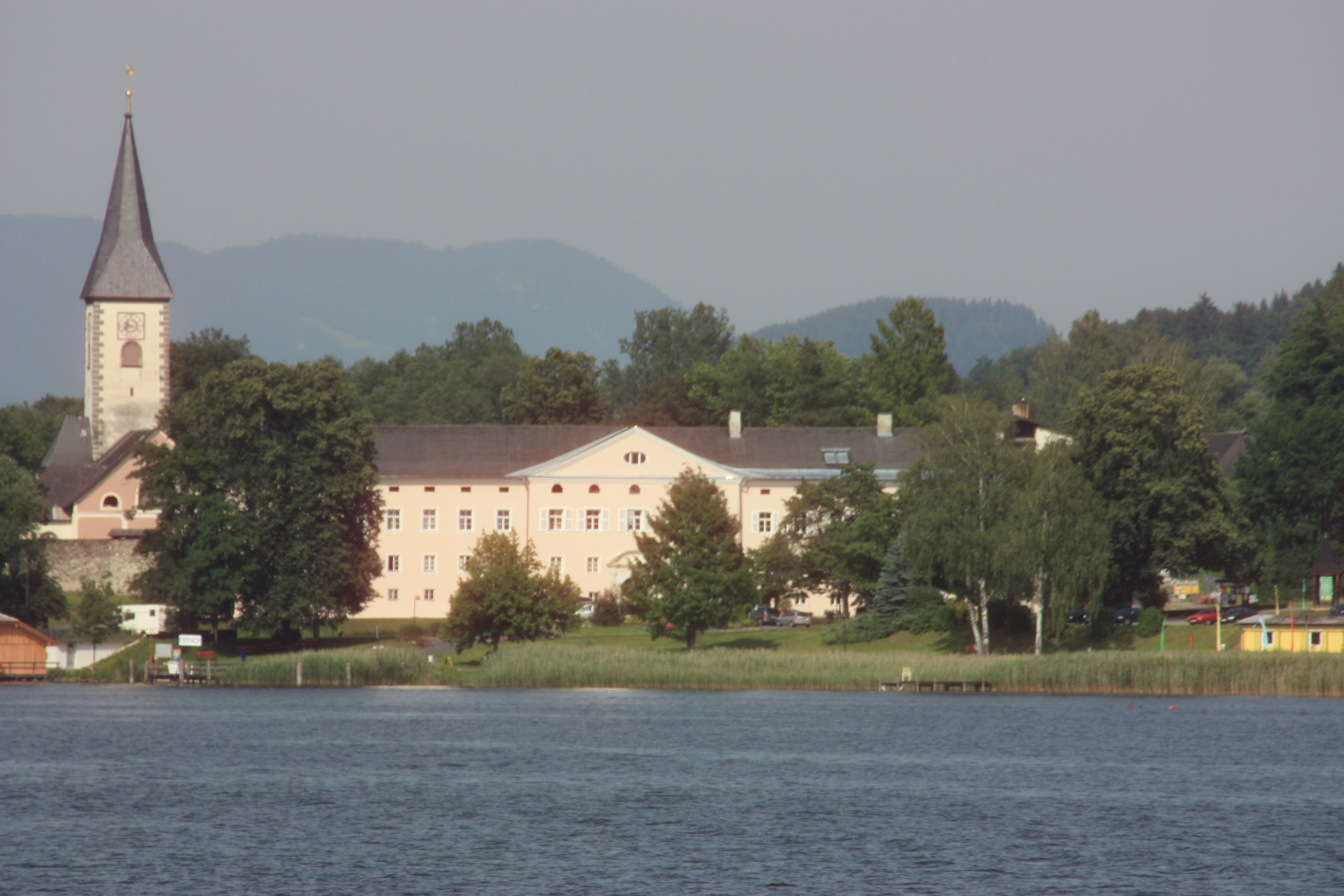
View from Lake Ossiach

Ossiach Abbey (Stift Ossiach) is a former Benedictine monastery in Ossiach, in the Austrian state of Carinthia. The site is one of the venues of an annual music festival called "Carinthian Summer".

== History ==
In 878 the East Frankish king Carloman of Bavaria dedicated the Treffen estates around Lake Ossiach to the Benedictine monastery of Ötting. In the late 10th century the lands passed to the Bishops of Passau and later to Emperor Henry II, who conferred them to a certain Count Ozi, affiliated with the Styrian Otakar dynasty and father of Patriarch Poppo of Aquileia.

A church probably already existed at Ossiach, when Count Ozi about 1024 established the Benedictine abbey, the first in the medieval Duchy of Carinthia. The first monks probably descended from Niederaltaich Abbey in Bavaria. Ozi's son Poppo succeeded in removing the proprietary monastery from the influence of the Salzburg archbishops and to affiliate it with the Patriarchate of Aquileia, confirmed by Emperor Conrad II in 1028. Upon the extinction of the Styrian Otakars in 1192, the Vogtei of Ossiach according to the Georgenberg Pact passed to the Austrian House of Babenberg. In 1282 it finally fell to the Habsburgs.

The Romanesque church itself was first mentioned in 1215, built on the groundplan of a basilica, with the tower above the crossing. Restored in a Late Gothic style after a fire in 1484, the abbey, a member of the Benedictine Salzburg Congregation from 1641, was extensively altered in the Baroque period, including stucco decoration of the Wessobrunner School.

Ossiach Abbey was dissolved by order of Emperor Joseph II in 1783, after which the buildings were used as a barracks. In 1816 the premises were largely demolished. Between 1872 and 1915 the few remaining buildings were again used as a barracks and as stabling. Since 1995 the premises have been owned by the administration of Carinthia. The church since the dissolution has served the local parish. Two stained glass windows were donated by Karl May in 1905, though according to recent research the popular writer had probably never visited Ossiach.

== Bolesław legend ==
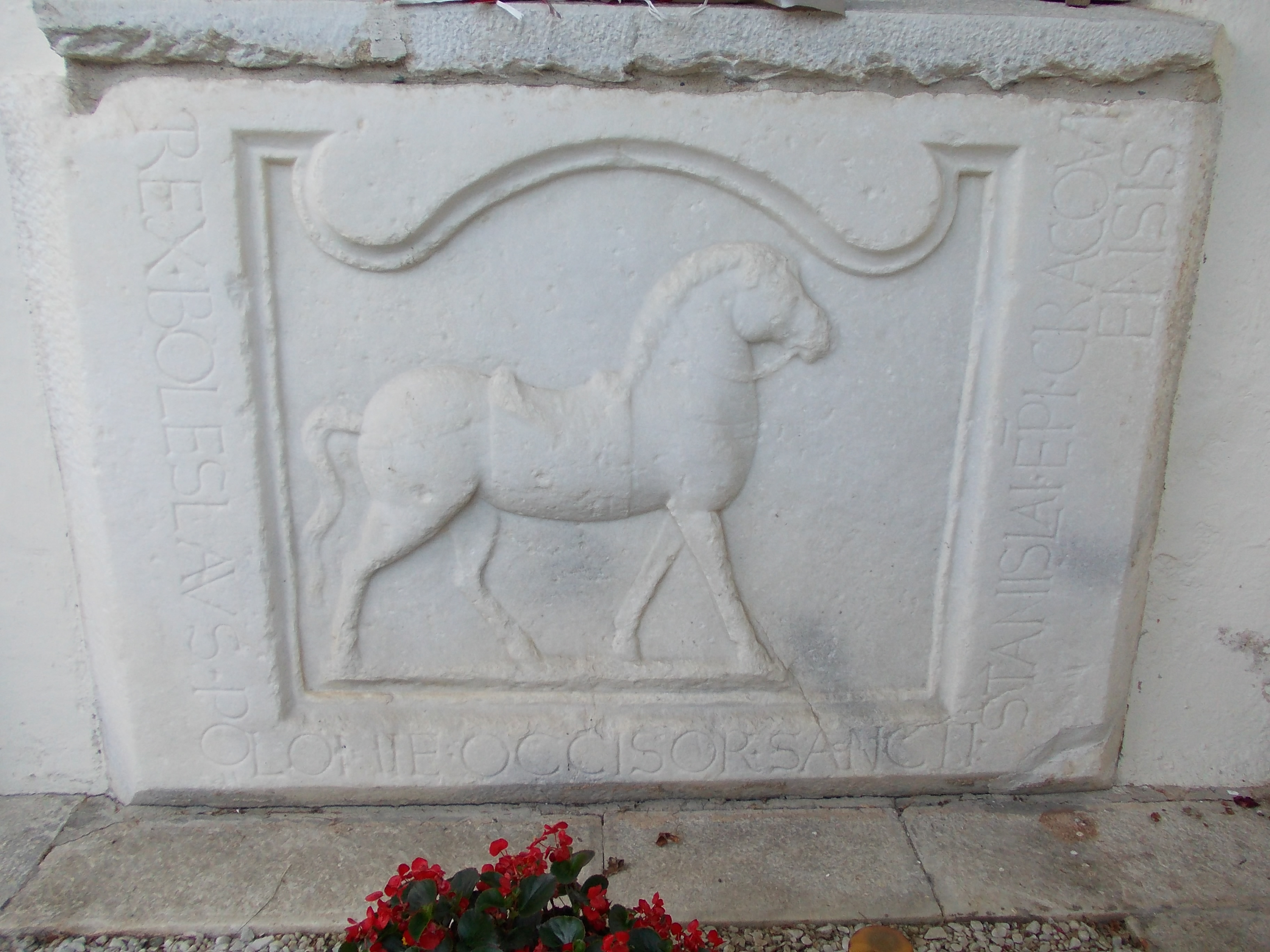
Tombstone of King Bolesław

According to legend, King Bolesław II the Bold of Poland, after he was banished in 1079 for the murder of Saint Stanislaus of Szczepanów and had fled to Hungary, then wandered through Europe and found peace at last when he arrived at Ossiach in 1081. There the king is said to have lived in the remote monastery as a mute penitent for eight years humbly doing the meanest and lowliest jobs, until on his death bed he told his father confessor who he was and what he had been doing penance for. The legend is documented since the 15th century; whether Bolesław actually ever lived at Ossiach could not be conclusively clarified.

Bolesław's alleged tomb is embedded in the northern side of the church wall, a Roman marble relief depicting a horse with the Latin inscription: REX BOLESLAVS OCCISOR SANCTI STANISLAI EPISCOPI CRACOVIENSIS ("Boleslav, King of Poland, Murderer of Saint Stanislav, Bishop of Cracow"). Above it, a painted epitaph shows several illustrations of the king's fate. A memorial stone was added by Polish servicemen in 1946.
