= St. Urban =

- Municipality
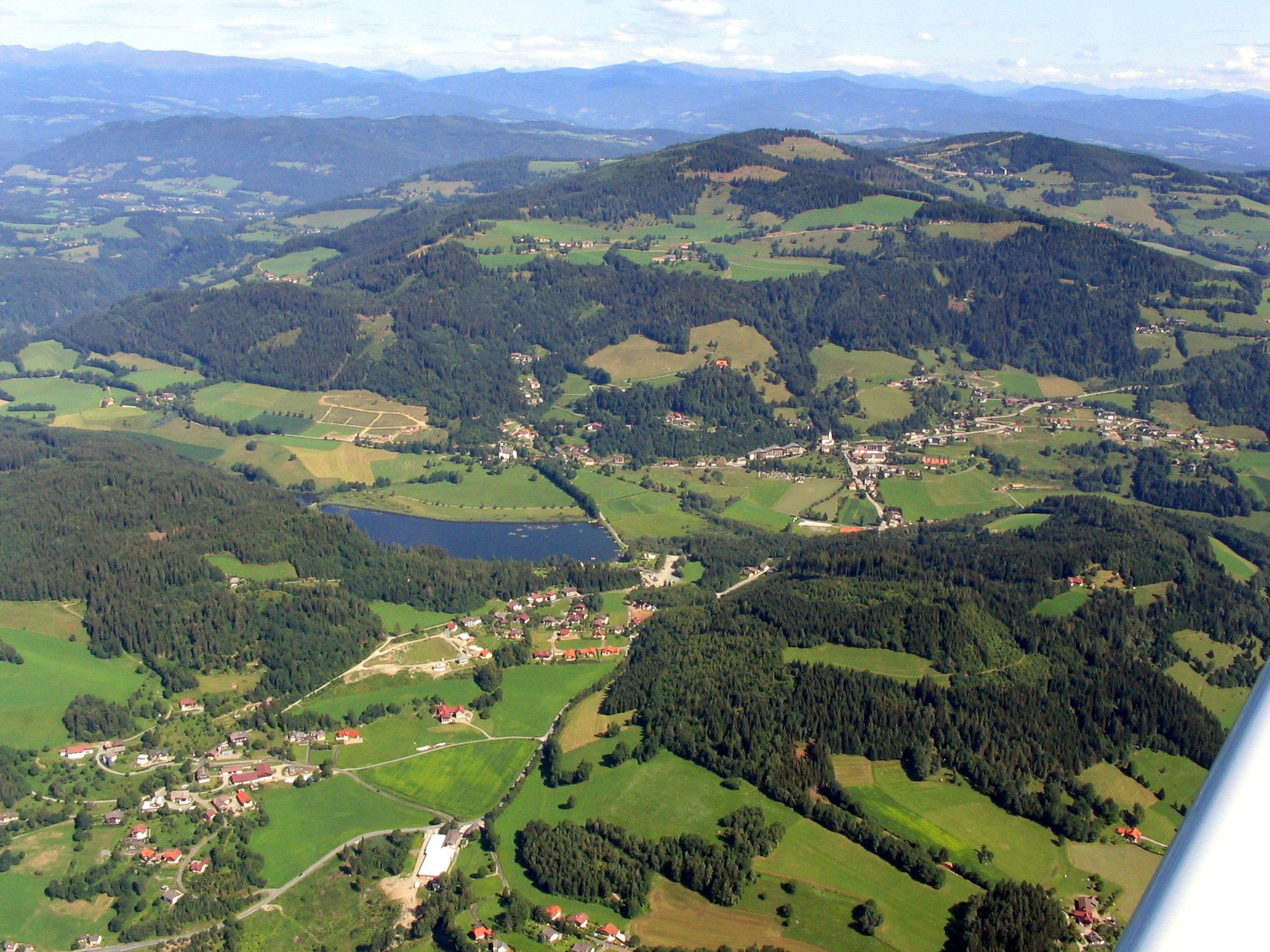
- Sankt Urban aerial view

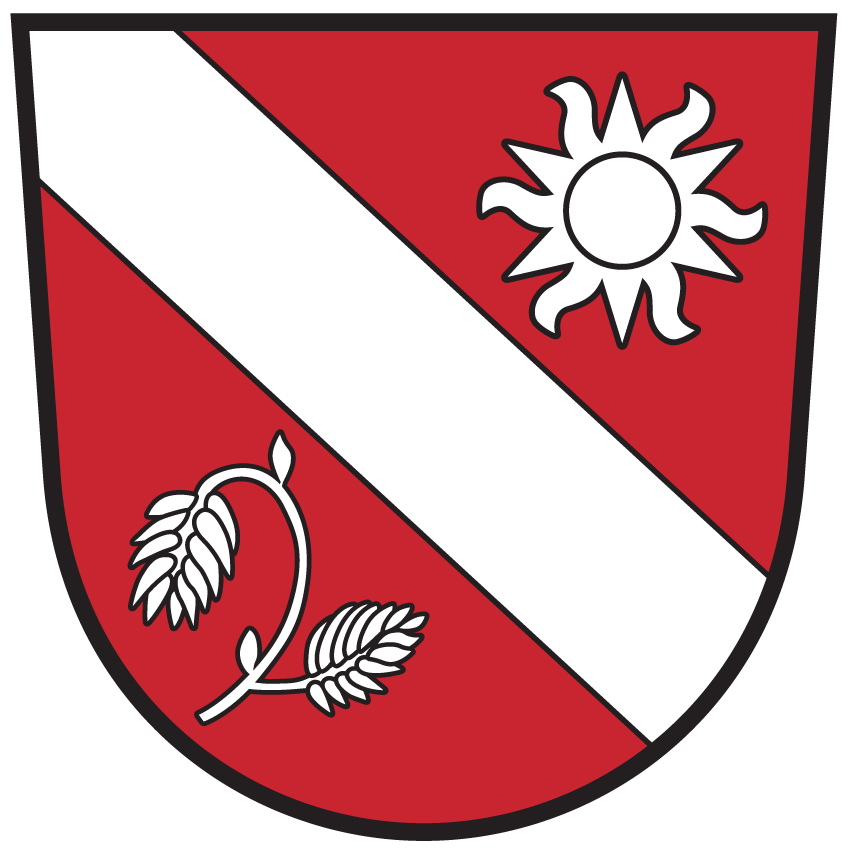
- Coat of arms

- Location within Austria
- Coordinates: 46°45′N 14°10′E
- Country: Austria
- State: Carinthia
- District: Feldkirchen

Government
  - Mayor: Dietmar Rauter

Area
  - Total: 27.27 km^{2} (10.53 sq mi)
- Elevation: 792 m (2,598 ft)

Population (2018-01-01)
  - Total: 1,544
  - Density: 56.62/km^{2} (146.6/sq mi)
- Time zone: UTC+1 (CET)
  - Summer (DST): UTC+2 (CEST)
- Postal code: 9554
- Website: www.sturban.at

St. Urban is a town in the district of Feldkirchen in the Austrian state of Carinthia.

== Geography ==
St. Urban lies in the Gurktal Alps in north-central Carinthia, about 10 kilometres (6.2 mi) northeast of Feldkirchen on St. Urban Lake. The lowest point is at 520 metres (1,710 ft) in the Glan valley and the highest at 1,338 m (4,390 ft) on the Hocheck.

== Nature ==
=== Dobra Moor ===
The Dobra moor (also called Jakobi or Freundsamer moor) is located at an altitude of 902 m above sea level. Surrounded by numerous gently rolling hills, such as the Gößeberg, Paulsberg and Illmitzer forest, it boasts a rich plant life which is typical of moors. This bog hosts a rare kind of Nordic Birch, a relic from the ice age which was first discovered in Carinthia in 1922.

== Neighboring municipalities ==
Steuerberg	Frauenstein
	Liebenfels
Feldkirchen in Kärnten	Glanegg
