= Steuerberg =

- Municipality
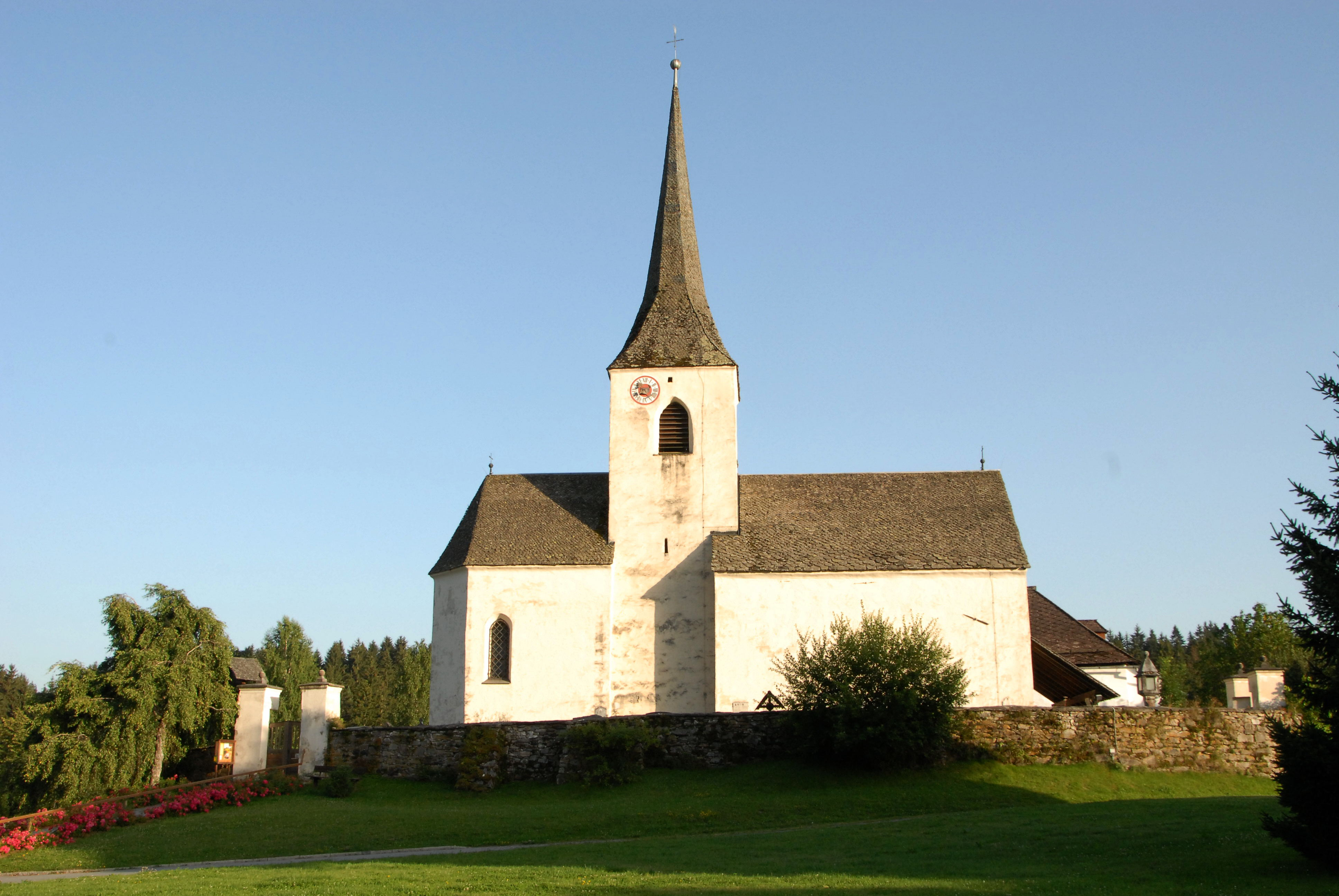
- Church of Saints Peter and Paul

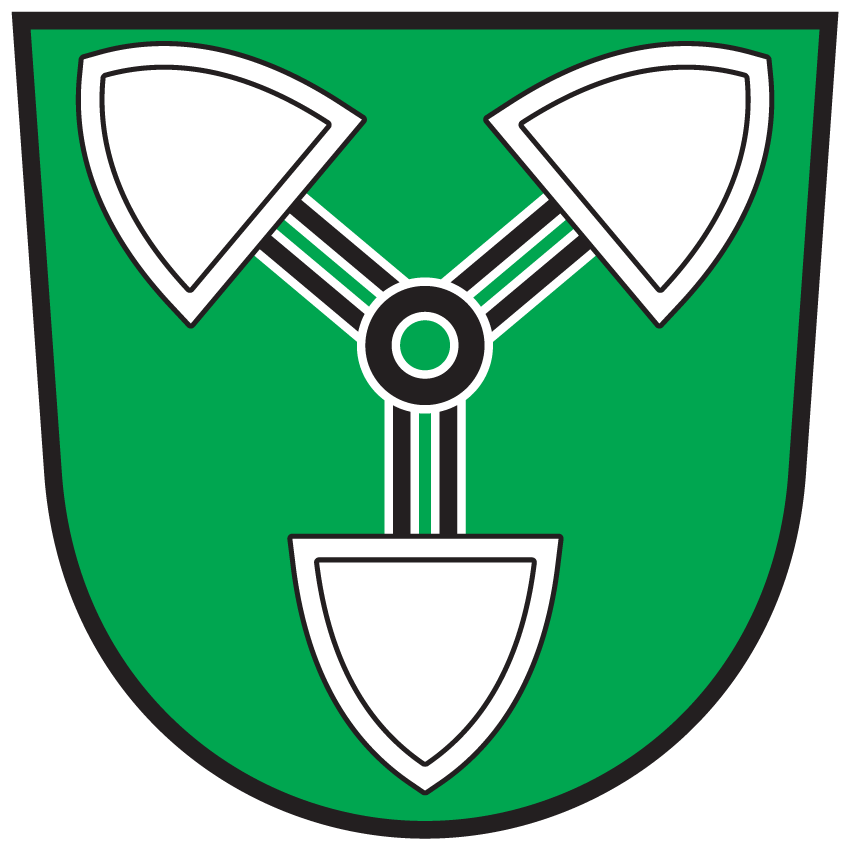
- Coat of arms

- Location within Austria
- Coordinates: 46°47′N 14°7′E
- Country: Austria
- State: Carinthia
- District: Feldkirchen

Government
  - Mayor: Karl Petritz (ÖVP)

Area
  - Total: 32.76 km^{2} (12.65 sq mi)
- Elevation: 782 m (2,566 ft)

Population (2018-01-01)
  - Total: 1,662
  - Density: 50.73/km^{2} (131.4/sq mi)
- Time zone: UTC+1 (CET)
  - Summer (DST): UTC+2 (CEST)
- Postal code: 9560
- Website: www.steuerberg.at

Steuerberg (Slovene: Šterska Gora) is a town in the district of Feldkirchen in the Austrian state of Carinthia.

== Geography ==
Steuerberg lies in the Gurktal Alps between the Gurk valley and the Wimitz valley, about 10 km north of Feldkirchen.

== Neighboring municipalities ==
Albeck		Weitensfeld
Gnesau		Frauenstein
Himmelberg	Feldkirchen	Sankt Urban
