= Feldkirchen District =

Coordinates: 46.750°N 14.037°E

Feldkirchen District Bezirk Feldkirchen
- District
- Country: Austria
- State: Carinthia
- Number of municipalities: 10
- Administrative seat: Feldkirchen

Government
  - District Governor: Dietmar Stückler (since 1996)

Area
  - Total: 558.6 km^{2} (215.7 sq mi)

Population (2024)
  - Total: 30,162
  - Density: 54.00/km^{2} (139.8/sq mi)
- Time zone: UTC+01:00 (CET)
  - Summer (DST): UTC+02:00 (CEST)
- Telephone prefix: 4276
- Vehicle registration: FE
- NUTS code: AT212
- District code: 210

Bezirk Feldkirchen is a district of the state of Carinthia in Austria.

== Municipalities ==
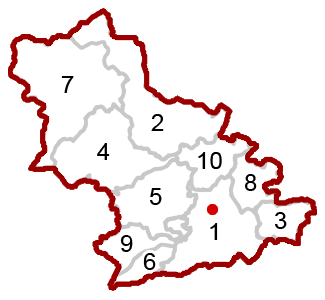
Towns (Städte) are indicated in boldface; suburbs, hamlets and other subdivisions of a municipality are indicated in small characters.

- Albeck (**2**)
  - Albeck Obere Schattseite, Albeck Untere Schattseite, Benesirnitz, Egarn, Frankenberg, Grillenberg, Hochrindl, Hochrindl-Alpl, Hochrindl-Kegel, Hochrindl-Tatermann, Hofern, Holzern, Kalsberg, Kogl, Kruckenalm, Lamm, Leßnitz, Neualbeck, Oberdörfl, Obereggen, Seebachern, Sirnitz, Sirnitz-Schattseite, Sirnitz-Sonnseite, Sirnitz-Winkl, Spitzwiesen, St. Ruprecht, Stron, Unterdörfl, Untereggen, Weitental, Wippa
- **Feldkirchen in Kärnten** (**1**)
- Glanegg (**3**)
  - Bach, Besendorf, Deblach, Flatschach, Friedlach, Glanegg, Glantscha, Gösselsberg, Gramilach, Grintschach, Haidach, Kadöll, Krobathen, Kulm, Maria Feicht, Maria Feicht-Gegend, Mauer, Mautbrücken, Meschkowitz, Metschach, Paindorf, Rottendorf, Schwambach, St. Gandolf, St. Leonhard, Tauchendorf, Unterglanegg
- Gnesau (**4**)
  - Bergl, Eben, Gnesau, Görzberg, Görzwinkl, Gurk, Haidenbach, Maitratten, Mitteregg, Sonnleiten, Weißenbach, Zedlitzdorf
- Himmelberg (**5**)
  - Außerteuchen, Dragelsberg, Draschen, Eden, Flatschach, Fresen, Glanz, Grilzberg, Grilzgraben, Grintschach, Himmelberg, Hochegg, Kaidern, Klatzenberg, Kösting, Kraß, Lassen, Linz, Manessen, Oberboden, Pichlern, Pojedl, Sallach, Saurachberg, Schleichenfeld, Schwaig, Sonnleiten, Spitzenbichl, Tiebel, Tiffnerwinkl, Tobitsch, Tschriet, Werschling, Winklern, Wöllach, Zedlitzberg
- Ossiach (**6**)
  - Alt-Ossiach, Ossiach, Ostriach, Rappitsch, Tauern, Untertauern
- Reichenau (**7**)
  - Ebene Reichenau, Falkertsee, Falkertsee, Hinterkoflach, Lassen, Lorenzenberg, Mitterdorf, Patergassen, Plaß, Rottenstein, Saureggen, Schuß, Seebach, St. Lorenzen, St. Margarethen, Turracherhöhe, Vorderkoflach, Vorwald, Waidach, Wiederschwing, Wiedweg, Winkl
- Sankt Urban (**8**)
  - Agsdorf, Agsdorf-Gegend, Bach, Bach-St. Urban, Eggen, Gall, Gasmai, Göschl, Gößeberg, Grai, Hafenberg, Kleingradenegg, Lawesen, Oberdorf, Reggen, Retschitz, Retschitz-Simonhöhe, Rittolach, Rogg, St. Paul, St. Urban, Stattenberg, Trenk, Tumpf, Zirkitz, Zwattendorf
- Steindorf am Ossiacher See (**9**)
  - Apetig, Bichl, Bodensdorf, Burg, Burgrad, Golk, Langacker, Nadling, Ossiachberg, Pfaffendorf, Regin, Sonnberg, St. Urban, Steindorf am Ossiacher See, Stiegl, Stiegl, Tiffen, Tratten, Tscherneitsch, Tschöran, Unterberg, Winkl Ossiachberg
- Steuerberg (**10**)
  - Dölnitz, Eden, Edern, Edling, Felfern, Fuchsgruben, Glabegg, Goggau, Graben, Hart, Hinterwachsenberg, Jeinitz, Kerschdorf, Köttern, Kraßnitz, Niederwinklern, Pölling, Prapra, Regenfeld, Rennweg, Rotapfel, Sallas, Sassl, Severgraben, St. Martin, Steuerberg, Thörl, Unterhof, Wabl, Wachsenberg, Wiggis
