= Gnesau =

- Municipality
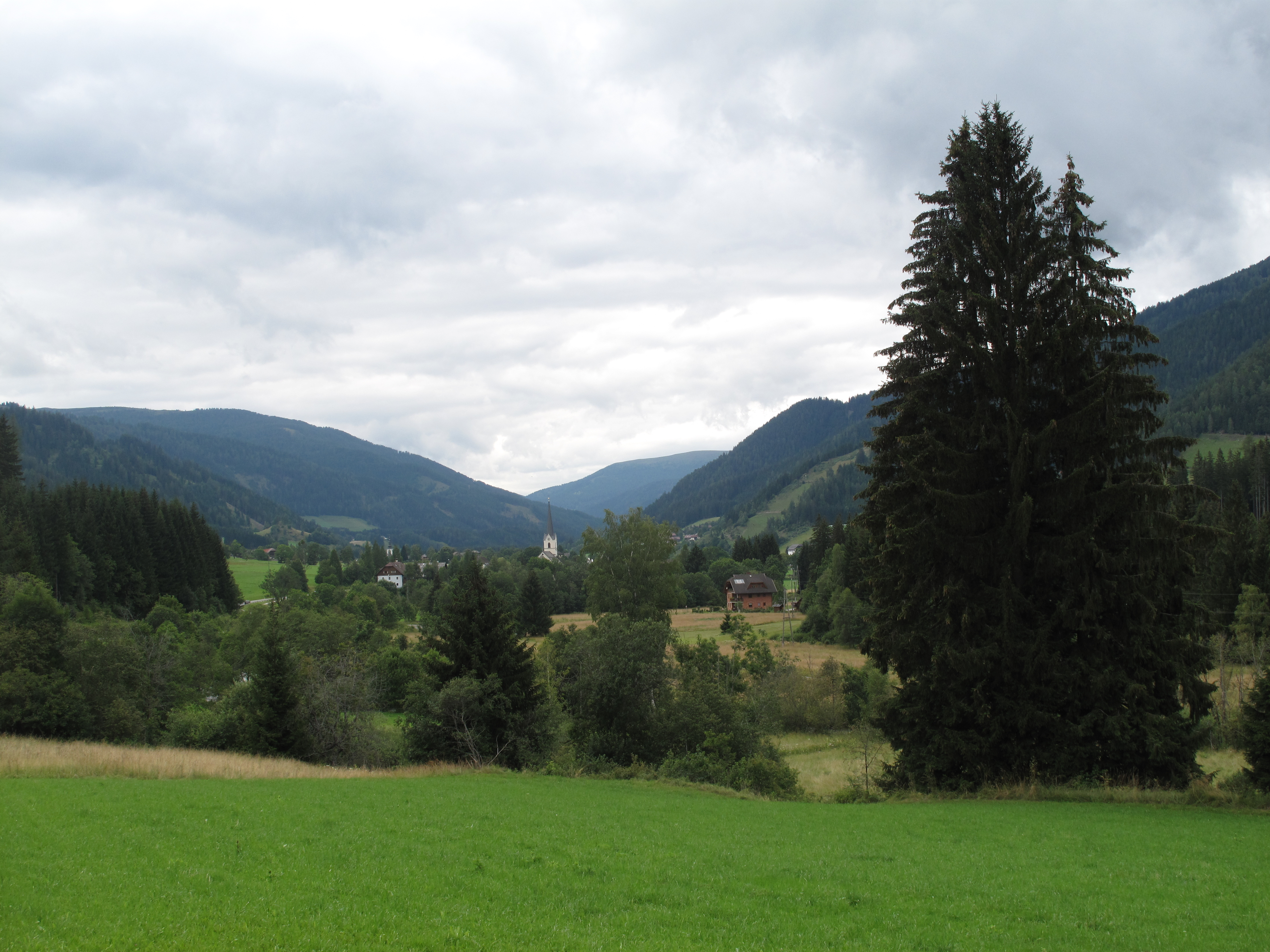

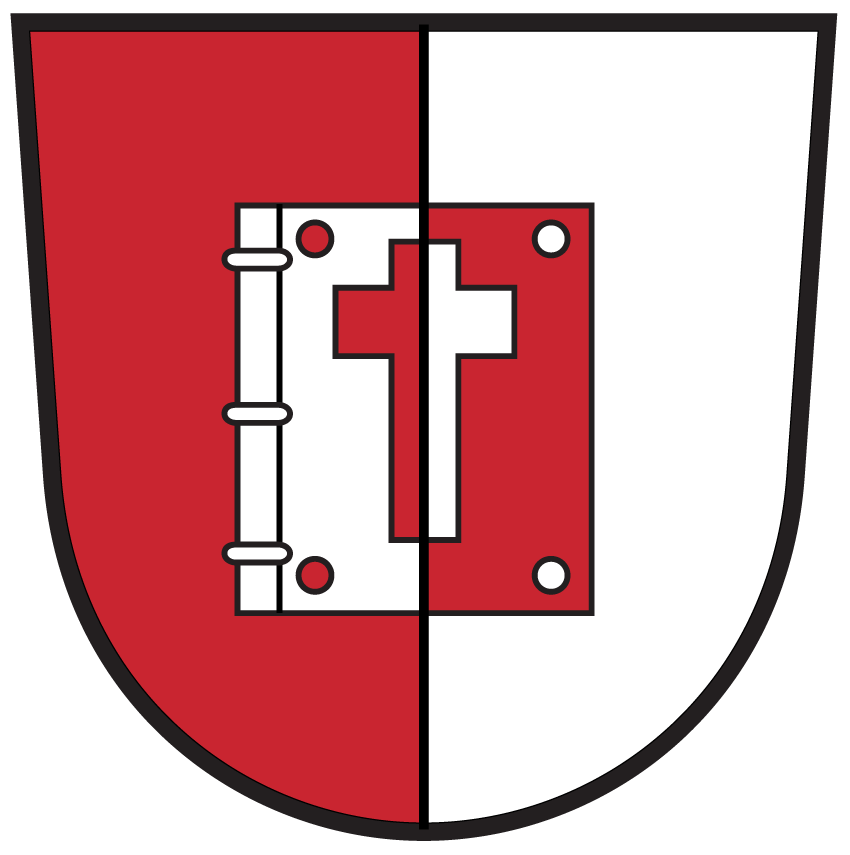
- Coat of arms

- Location within Austria
- Coordinates: 46°46′N 13°58′E
- Country: Austria
- State: Carinthia
- District: Feldkirchen

Government
  - Mayor: Erich Stampfer

Area
  - Total: 78.67 km^{2} (30.37 sq mi)
- Elevation: 973 m (3,192 ft)

Population (2024)
  - Total: 1,037
  - Density: 13.18/km^{2} (34.14/sq mi)
- Time zone: UTC+1 (CET)
  - Summer (DST): UTC+2 (CEST)
- Postal code: 9563
- Website: www.gnesau.at

Gnesau is a town in the district of Feldkirchen in the Austrian state of Carinthia.

== Geography ==
Gnesau lies in the upper Gurk valley in the Gurktal Alps.

The Gurk runs from northwest to southeast through the municipality. Right tributaries are the Haidenbach and the Kirchergrabenbach; left tributaries are the Görzbach and the Peiningerbach.

== Neighboring municipalities ==
Reichenau	Albeck, Carinthia
	Steuerberg
Arriach	Himmelberg
