= Glanegg =

- Municipality
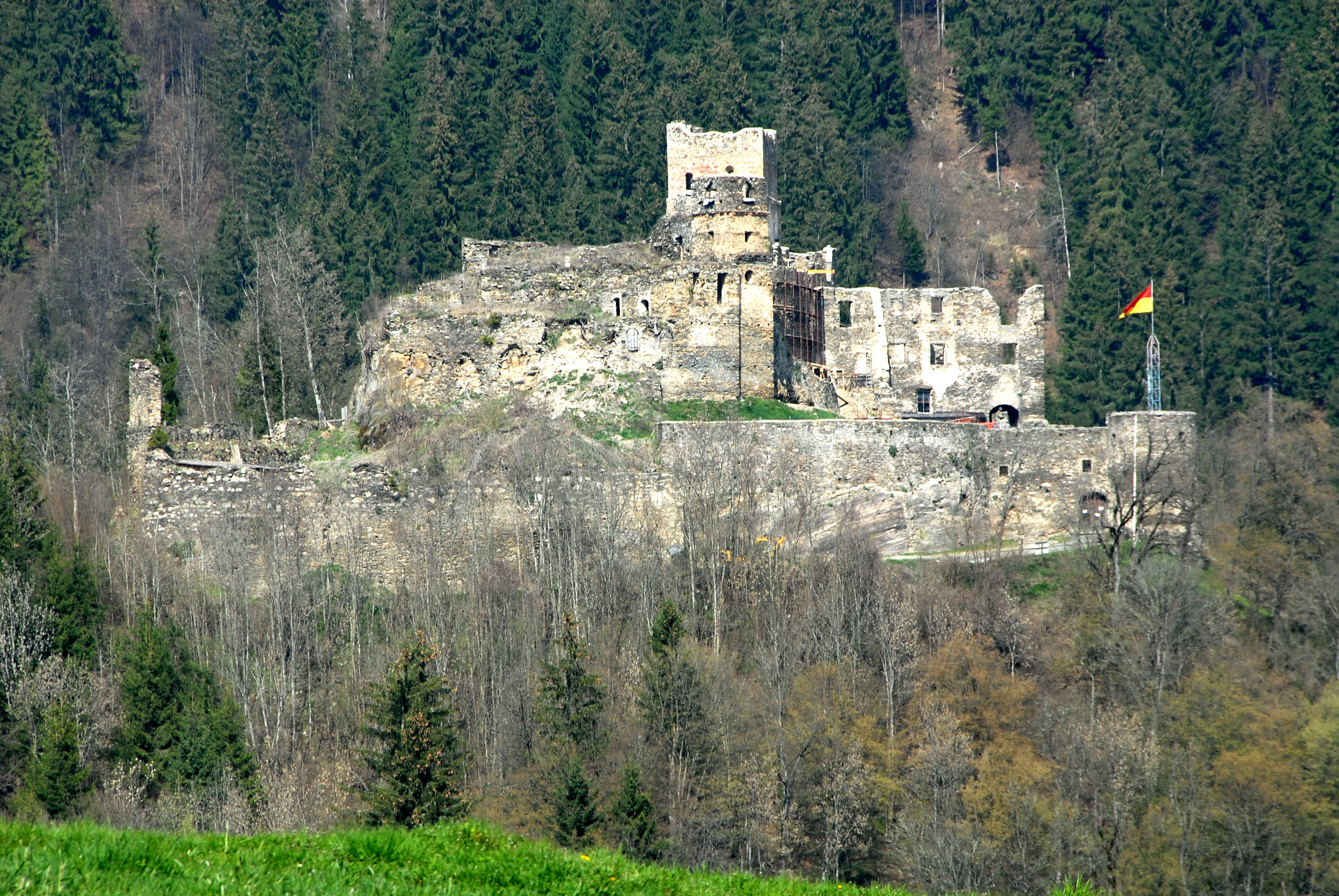
- Glanegg ruins

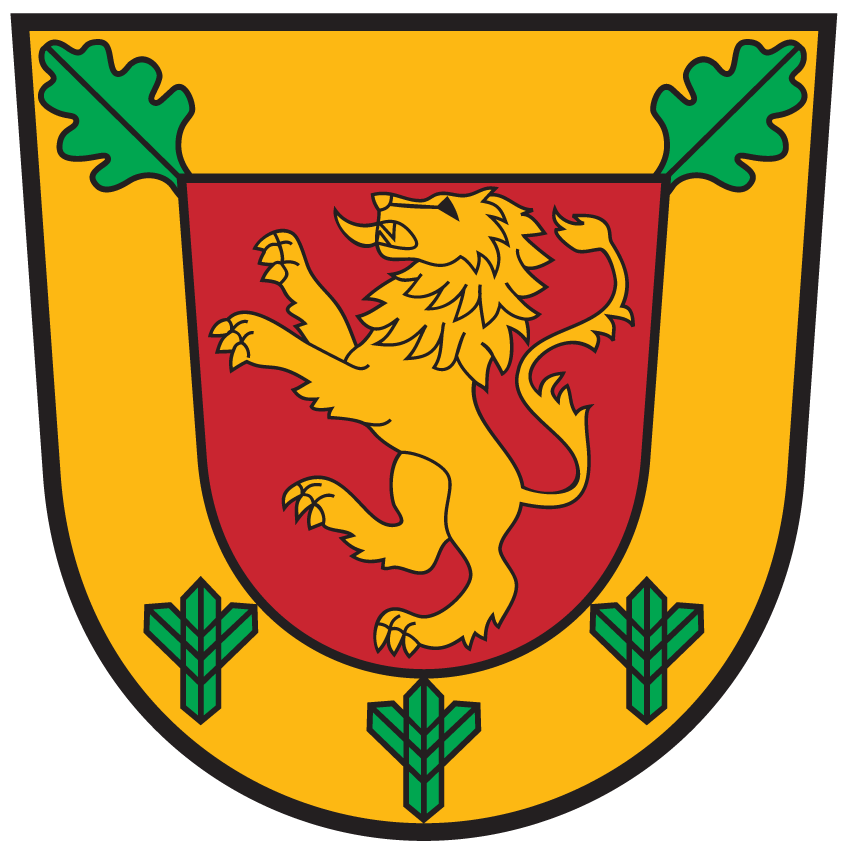
- Coat of arms

- Location within Austria
- Coordinates: 46°43′N 14°12′E
- Country: Austria
- State: Carinthia
- District: Feldkirchen

Government
  - Mayor: Guntram Samitz

Area
  - Total: 25.16 km^{2} (9.71 sq mi)
- Elevation: 498 m (1,634 ft)

Population (2018-01-01)
  - Total: 1,869
  - Density: 74.28/km^{2} (192.4/sq mi)
- Time zone: UTC+1 (CET)
  - Summer (DST): UTC+2 (CEST)
- Postal code: 9555
- Website: https://www.glanegg.gv.at/

Glanegg is a town in the district of Feldkirchen in Carinthia in Austria.

== Geography ==
Glanegg lies in the Glan valley between Sankt Veit and Feldkirchen.

== Neighboring municipalities ==
Sankt Urban		Liebenfels
Feldkirchen
	Moosburg	Klagenfurt
