= Lake of Flatschach =

- Flatschacher See (German)
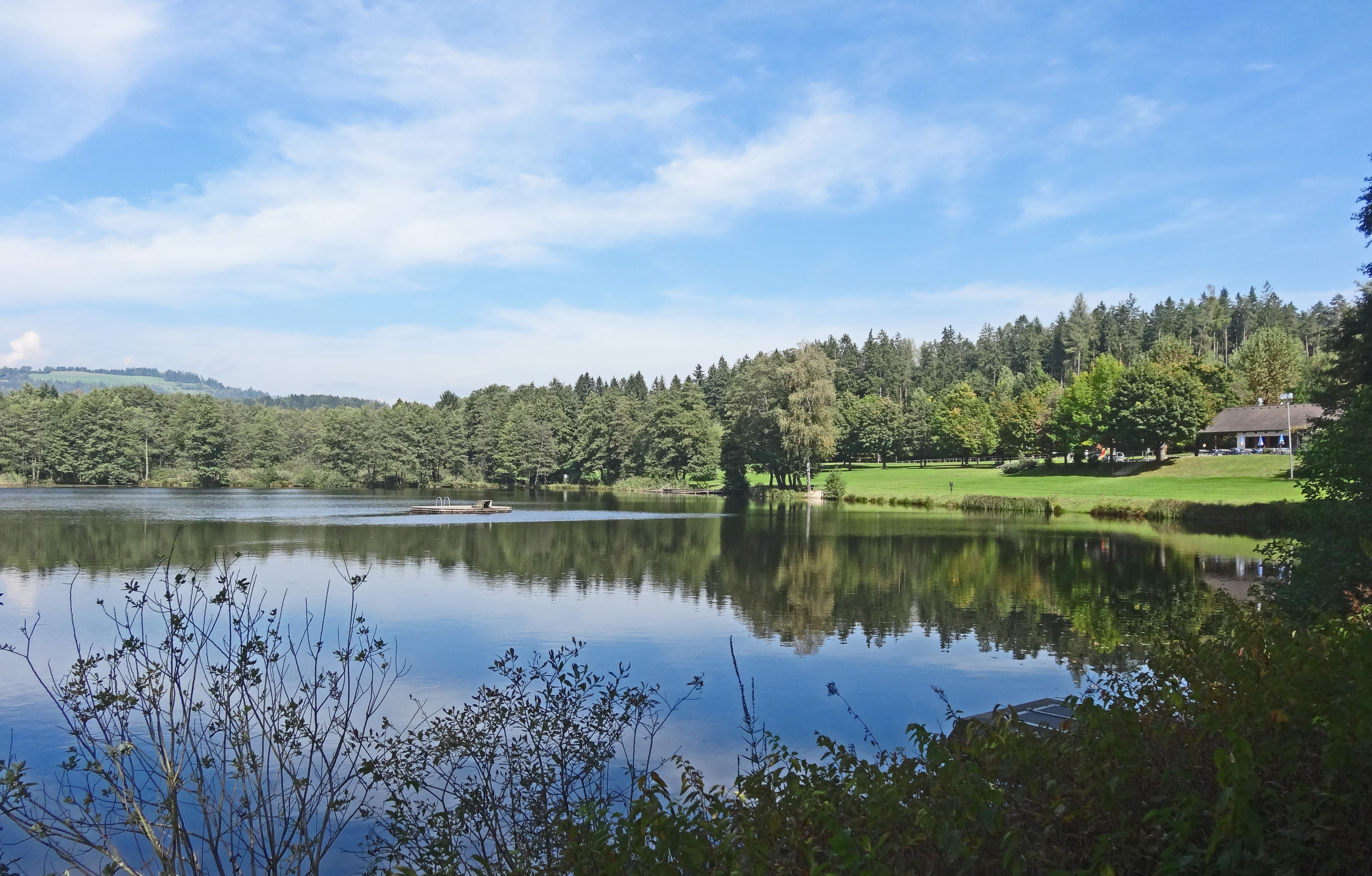
- Southern part of Lake of Flatschach

- Location within Austria
- Location: Feldkirchen in Kärnten, Carinthia, Austria
- Coordinates: 46.7279°N 14.0622°E
- Type: lake

Lake of Flatschach (German: Flatschacher See) is an Austrian lake at Flatschach near Feldkirchen in Kärnten in the State of Carinthia.

== Description ==
Since its inflow passes through a region heavily used for agriculture, the lake is heavily contaminated with nutrients. The lake itself is located in the 272 hectares (670 acres) protected area of 'Flatschacher See'.

== Fauna ==
The following species of fish are found in Lake Flatschacher: Carassius carassius, Carp, Cyprinus carpio, common rudd, Rutilus rutilus and Sander lucioperca.

== Links ==
- Flatschacher See (Kärntner Institut für Seenforschung) (in German)
