= Wolfgang Neumann =

Austrian opera singer

Wolfgang Neumann (born 20 June 1945) is an Austrian internationally known operatic heldentenor, who specialized in the operas of Richard Wagner.

== Career ==
Born in Waiern, part of Feldkirchen in Kärnten, Austria, he began his career as a baritone, but following a period of transition, he made his debut as a tenor in 1971 at Bielefeld Opera as Max in Der Freischütz. From 1980, Neumann was the first heldentenor of the National Theatre Mannheim. He appeared at Munich, Hamburg, Vienna (Staatsoper), Brussels, Oslo, Berlin (Deutsche Oper), Lisbon, Barcelona (as Aron in Moses und Aron), Dallas, Chile, Monte-Carlo, Bologna, Marseilles, Catania, and Florence. Neumann also appeared at the Teatro Colón, Bayreuth Festival (in Tannhäuser, 1995), Paris Opéra, the Royal Opera House, and Teatro alla Scala (Die Frau ohne Schatten, in Jean-Pierre Ponnelle's production, 1986).

In 1985, Neumann recorded the role of Jimmy Mahoney in Aufstieg und Fall der Stadt Mahagonny (opposite Anja Silja, and conducted by Jan Latham Koenig, for Capriccio), and, in 1994-95, recorded the name part in Siegfried (for Bella Musica).

In 1998, he made his debut at the Metropolitan Opera in the title role of Siegfried, with Sir Donald McIntyre, and James Levine conducting. That same year, he sang Siegfried in Götterdämmerung, and returned in that role for complete versions of Der Ring des Nibelungen (2000).

In 2001, he sang in Intolleranza 1960, in Bremen (which was recorded, then released on a Compact Disc in 2012), and returned to the Met for performances (one of which was televised) of the Drum Major in Wozzeck, and the next year sang Ägisth in Elektra, which were his final performances in New York.

Also in Neumann's repertoire were the roles of Rienzi, Erik (Der fliegende Holländer), Lohengrin, Loge, Siegmund, Tristan, Parsifal, Hermann (Pique dame), Canio (Pagliacci), Herod (Salome), the Kaiser (Die Frau ohne Schatten), and Bacchus (Ariadne auf Naxos).

The heldentenor bid farewell to the stage on 30 July 2010 at Mannheim in Götterdämmerung.

== Videography ==
- Berg: Wozzeck (Dalayman, Struckmann, Devlin; Levine, Lamos, 2001) [live] Metropolitan Opera

== Sources ==
- Cummings, David (ed.), "Neumann, Wolfgang", International Who's Who in Music, Routledge, 200, p. 465. ISBN 0-948875-53-4
- Liner notes to Aufstieg und Fall der Stadt Mahagonny, Capriccio, 1988.
