= Feldkirchen in Kärnten =

- Municipality
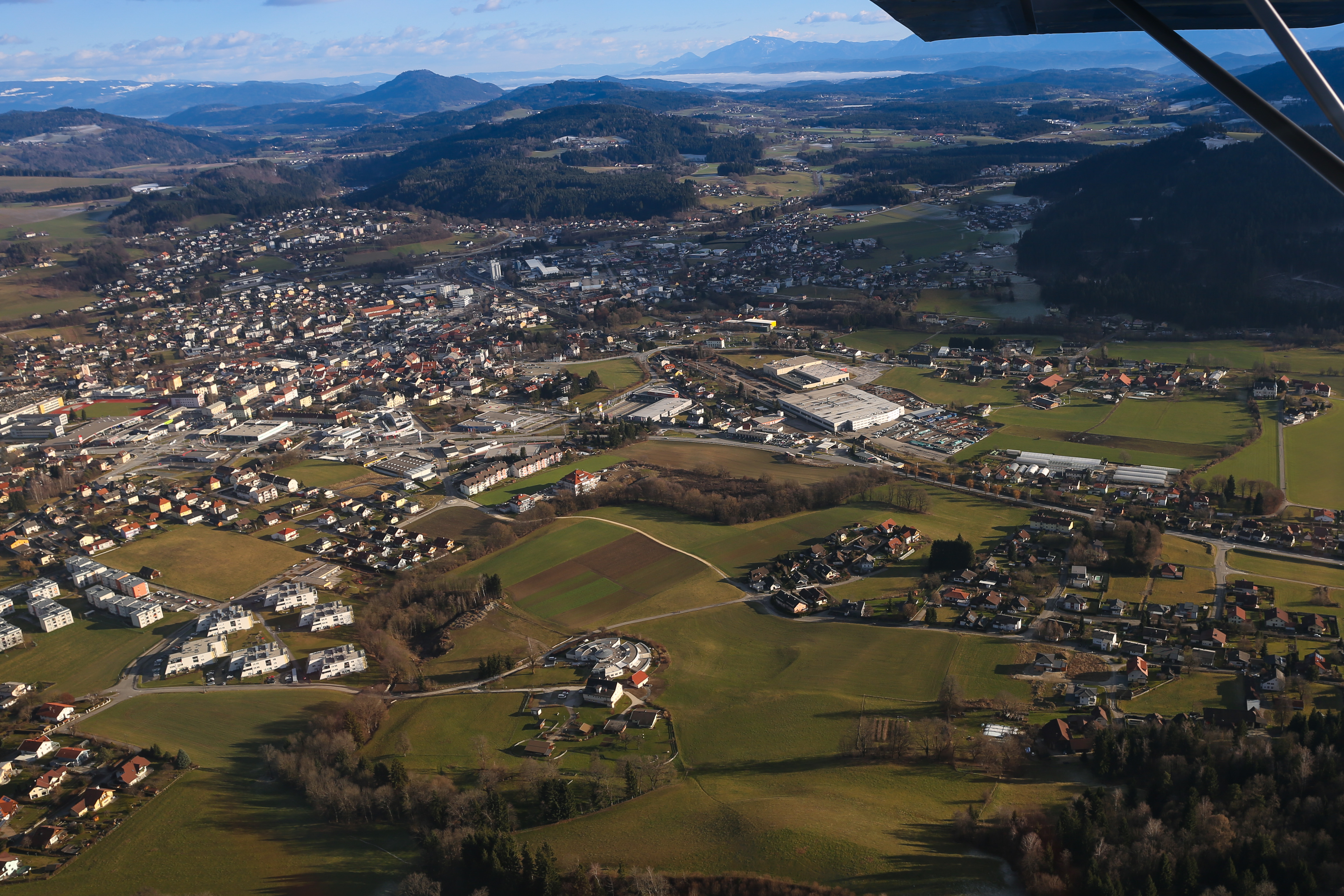

- Coat of arms

- Location within Austria
- Coordinates: 46°43′N 14°6′E
- Country: Austria
- State: Carinthia
- District: Feldkirchen

Government
  - Mayor: Martin Treffner (ÖVP)

Area
  - Total: 77.5 km^{2} (29.9 sq mi)
- Elevation: 554 m (1,818 ft)

Population (2018-01-01)
  - Total: 14,198
  - Density: 183/km^{2} (474/sq mi)
- Time zone: UTC+1 (CET)
  - Summer (DST): UTC+2 (CEST)
- Postal code: 9560
- Website: www.feldkirchen.at

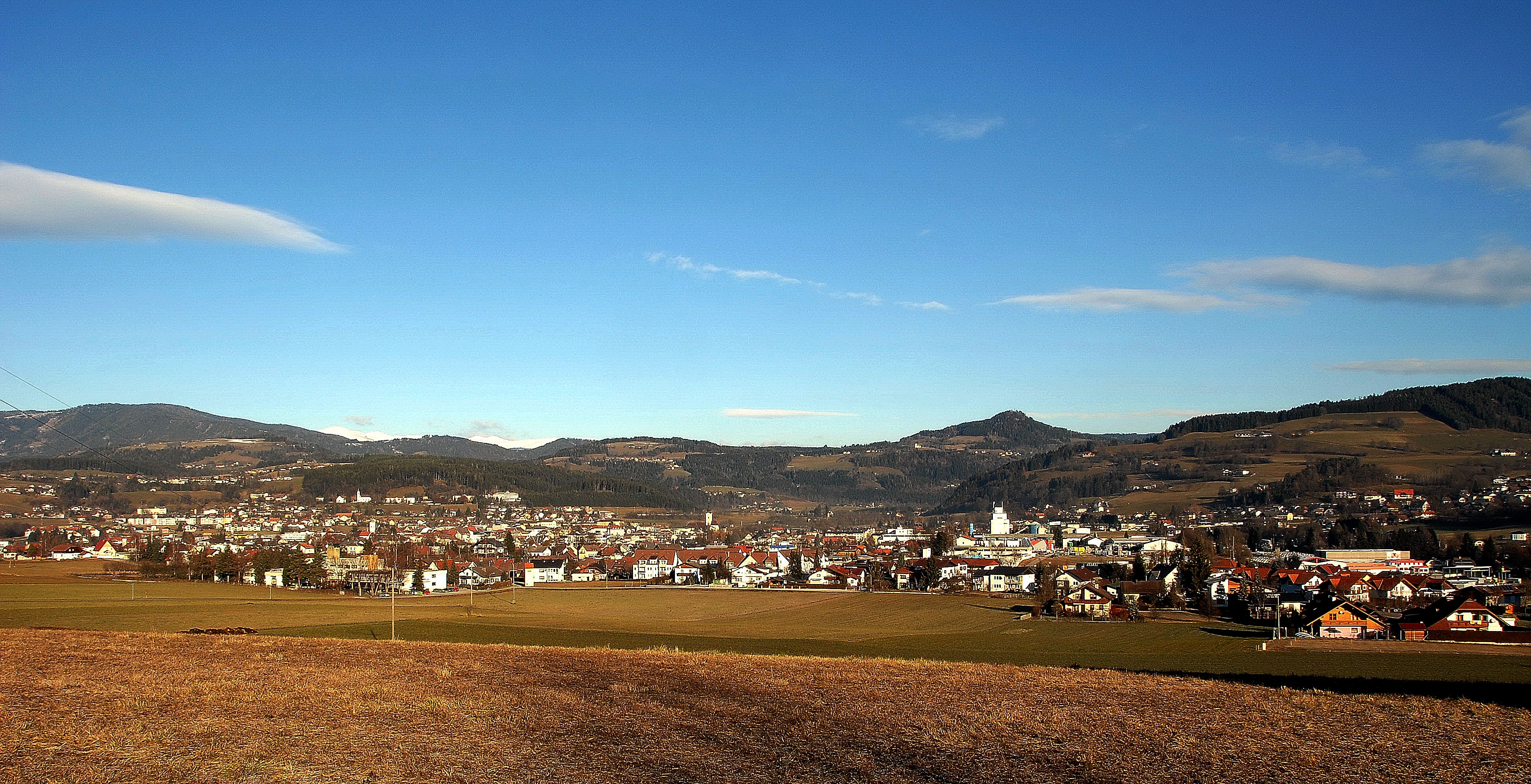

Feldkirchen in Kärnten is a town in the Austrian state of Carinthia and the capital of the district of the same name. It consists of the Katastralgemeinden Fasching, Feldkirchen, Glanhofen, Gradisch, Hoefling, Klein Sankt Veit, Pernegg, Rabensdorf, Sankt Ulrich, Sittich, Tschwarzen and Waiern. The name Feldkirchen means the church in the fields.

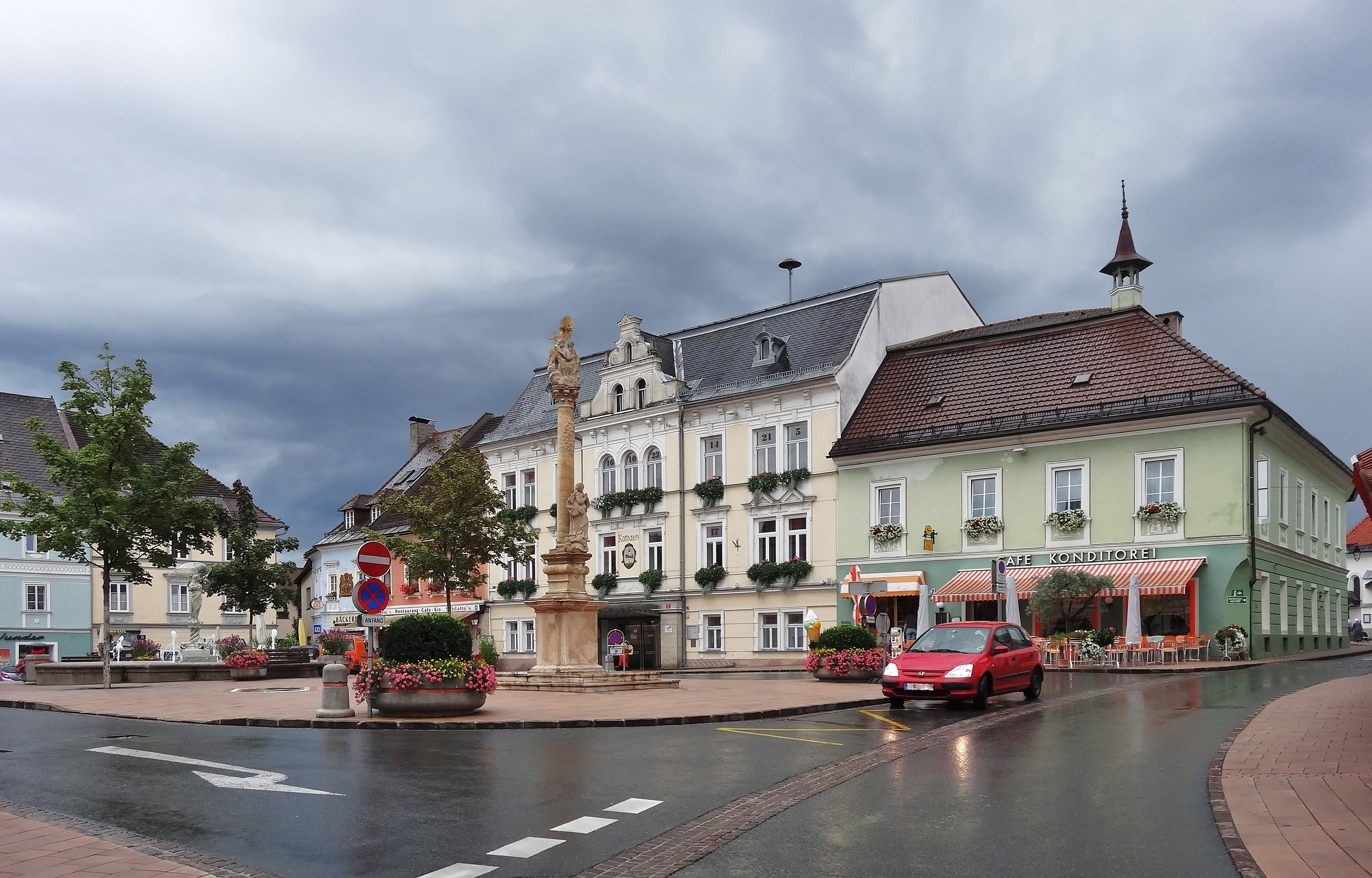
The Hauptplatz (Main place)

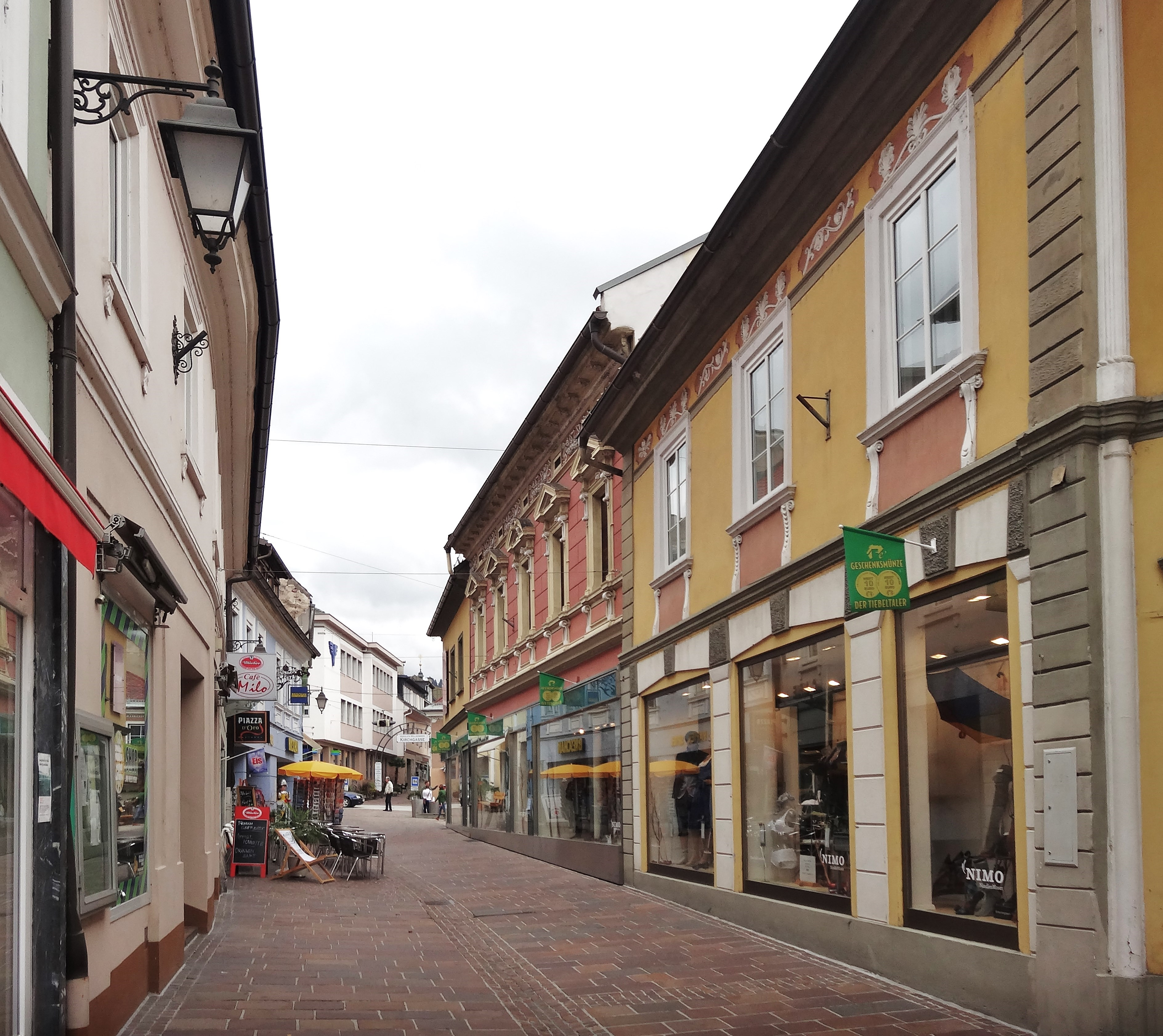
View to the Kirchgasse

== Geography ==
=== Location ===
Feldkirchen is located on the northern edge of the Klagenfurt Basin at the junction of the federal highways (Bundesstraßen) B 93 Gurktal Straße toward Friesach, B 94 Ossiacher Straße to Villach and B 95 Turracher Straße to Klagenfurt.

=== Waters ===
Both the Glan river and the small Tiebel, main inflow of Lake Ossiach, run through the town.

There are three lakes in the vicinity to Feldkirchen

- The Lake of Flatschach (Flatschacher See)
- The Lake of Dietrichstein (Dietrichsteiner See)
- The Lake of Maltschach (Maltschacher See)
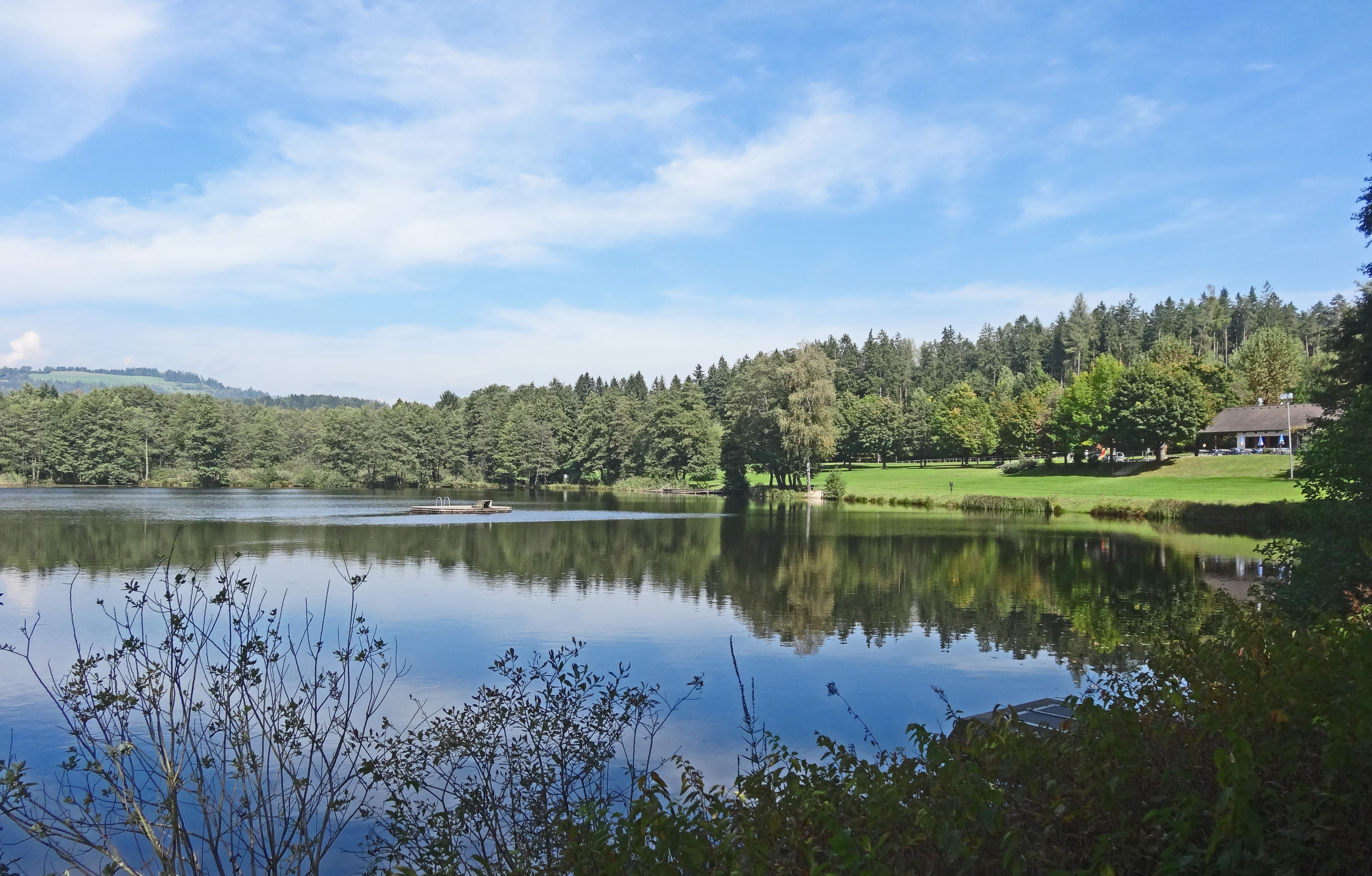
Lake of Flatschach

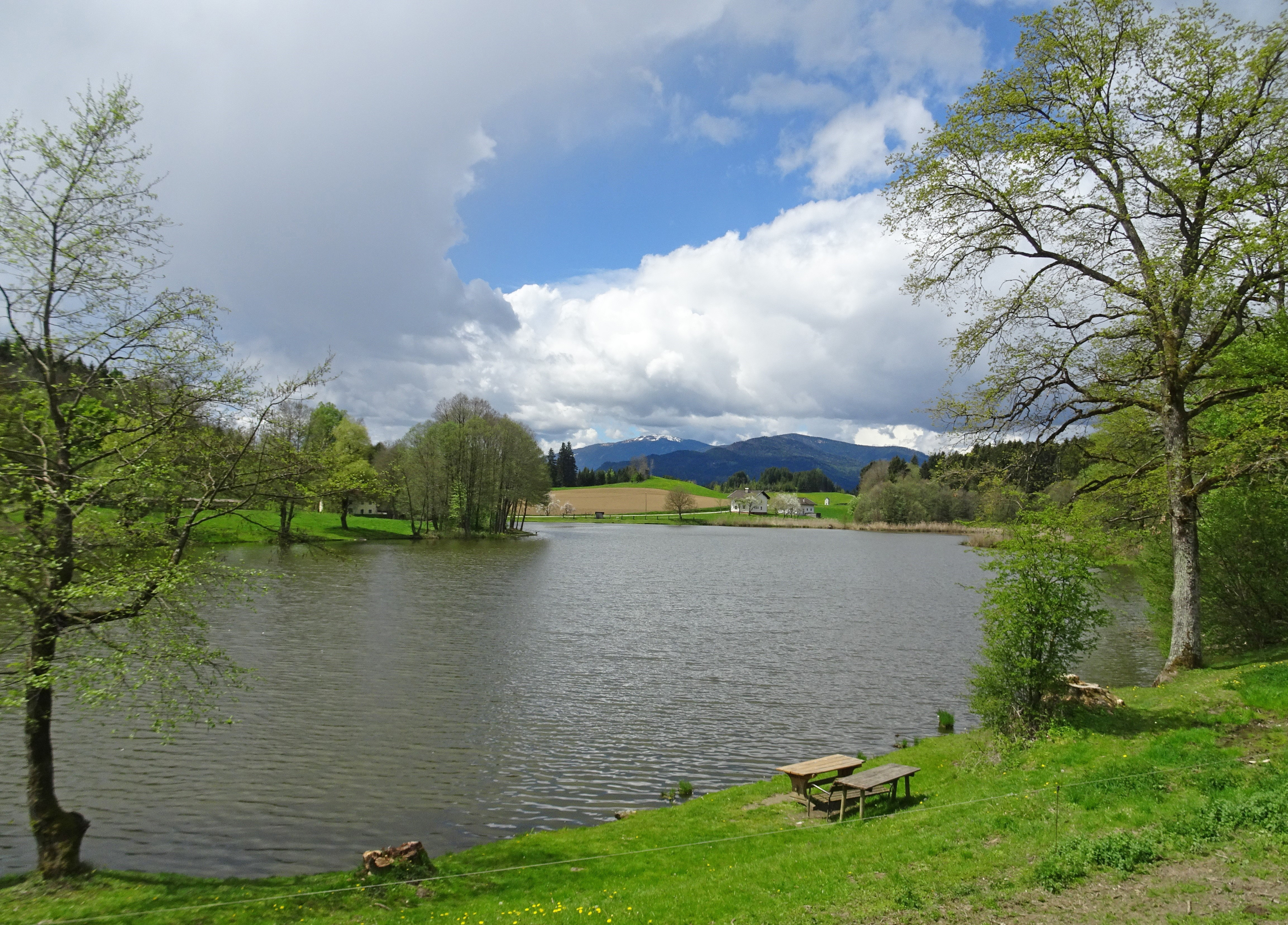
Lake of Dietrichstein

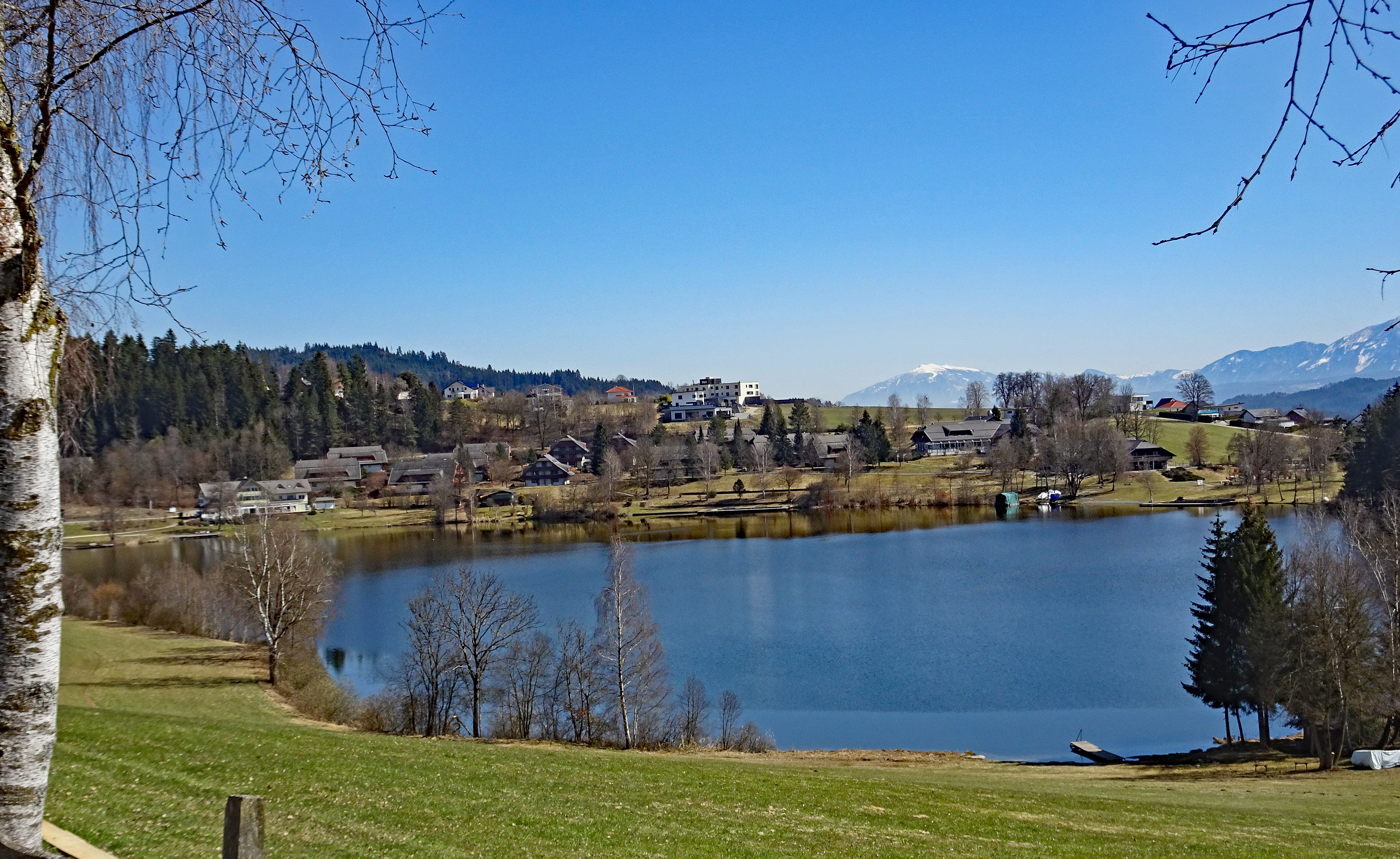
Lake of Maltschach

=== Neighbouring municipalities ===
Himmelberg	Steuerberg	Sankt Urban
Steindorf		Glanegg
Ossiach Velden	Techelsberg	Moosburg

== History ==
The settlement may have developed at the site of the former Beliandrum mansio along the Roman road from Teurnia near Spittal an der Drau to Virunum, capital of the Noricum province. A Roman tombstone of the 2nd century is included into the walls of the Saint Michael filial church. The earliest mention of Feldkirchen is as Ueldchiricha ("Church in the Fields") in an 888 document by Arnulf of Carinthia. The parish church Maria im Dorn, a Romanesque basilica with a Carolingian choir, is one of the oldest sacred buildings in Carinthia.

Feldkirchen, once an estate of the Eppenstein noble family, was bequeathed to the Diocese of Bamberg in 1166. The bishops had the Amthof erected, the former seat of the local administration, today a place for cultural events and a small museum. Finally Maria Theresa of Austria acquired Feldkirchen in 1759. The village of Markstein south of the town centre is a former checkpoint at the border between the Austrian Empire and the Upper Carinthian part of the short-lived Napoleonic Illyrian Provinces. The building of a customs station and a border stone remained. Feldkirchen received town privileges in 1930.

== Demographics ==
According to the 2001 census, Feldkirchen has 14,030 inhabitants. Of that, 77.1% admit themselves to the Roman Catholic Church, 12.0% are Evangelist, 0.8% belong to the Orthodox Church, and 5.1% are Muslims. 2.0% are non-religious.

== Sights ==
- Catholic parish church Maria im Dorn
- Catholic church St. Michael
- Catholic church St. Martin
- Catholic church St. Ulrich
- Amthof
- Antoniusheim

== Gallery ==
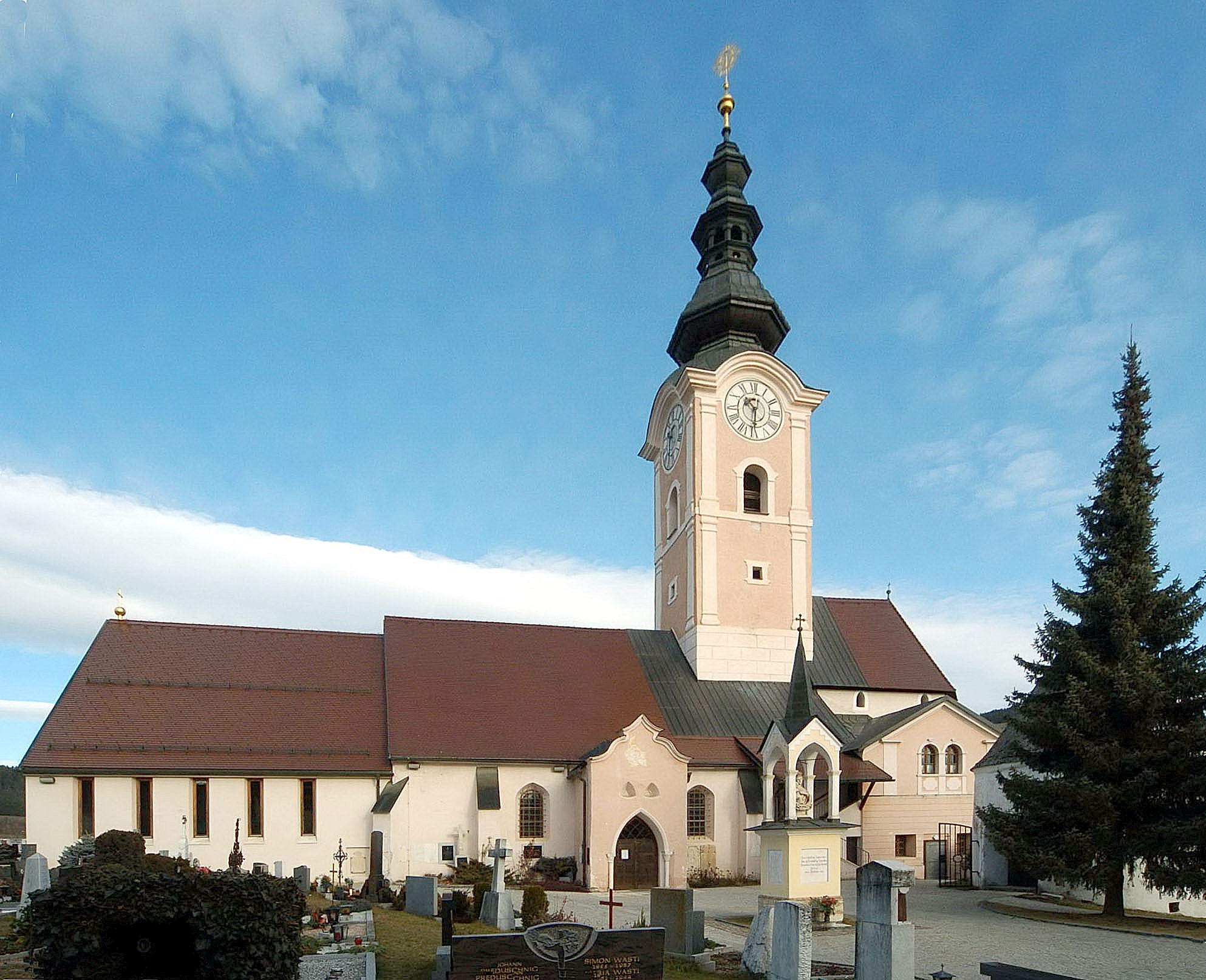
Parish church Maria im Dorn

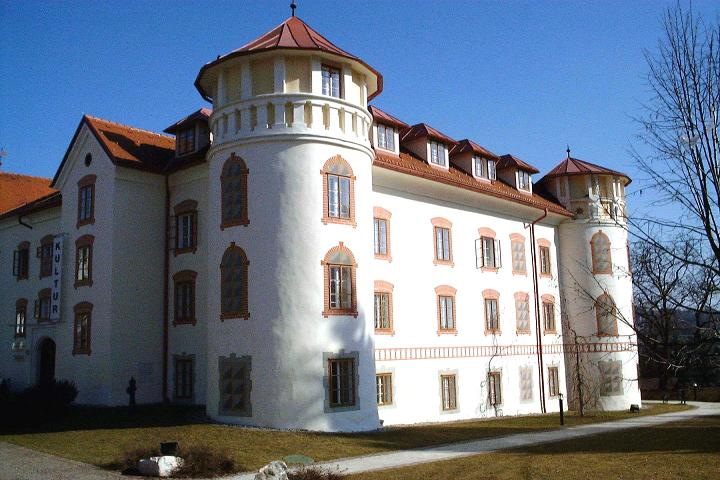
Amthof

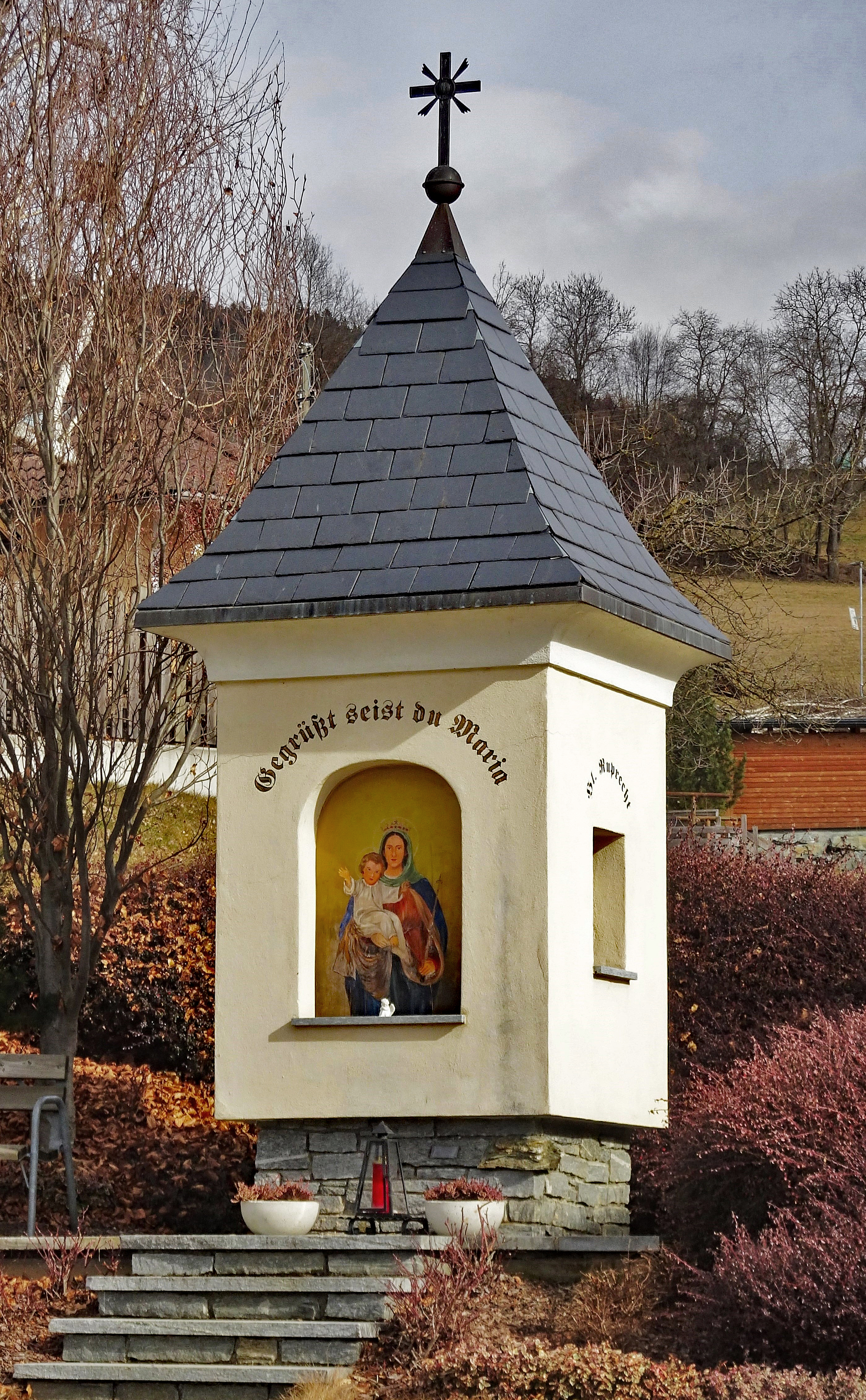
Luager Cross

== Politics ==
Seats in the municipal assembly (Gemeinderat) as of 2015 elections:

- Social Democratic Party of Austria (SPÖ): 14
- Austrian People's Party (ÖVP): 10
- Freedom Party of Austria (FPÖ): 3
- Greens: 2
- FePlus: 2

== International relations ==
=== Twin towns — sister cities ===
Feldkirchen in Kärnten is twinned with:

- Bamberg, Germany, since 1993
- Ahrensburg, Germany, since 1998

== Notable residents ==
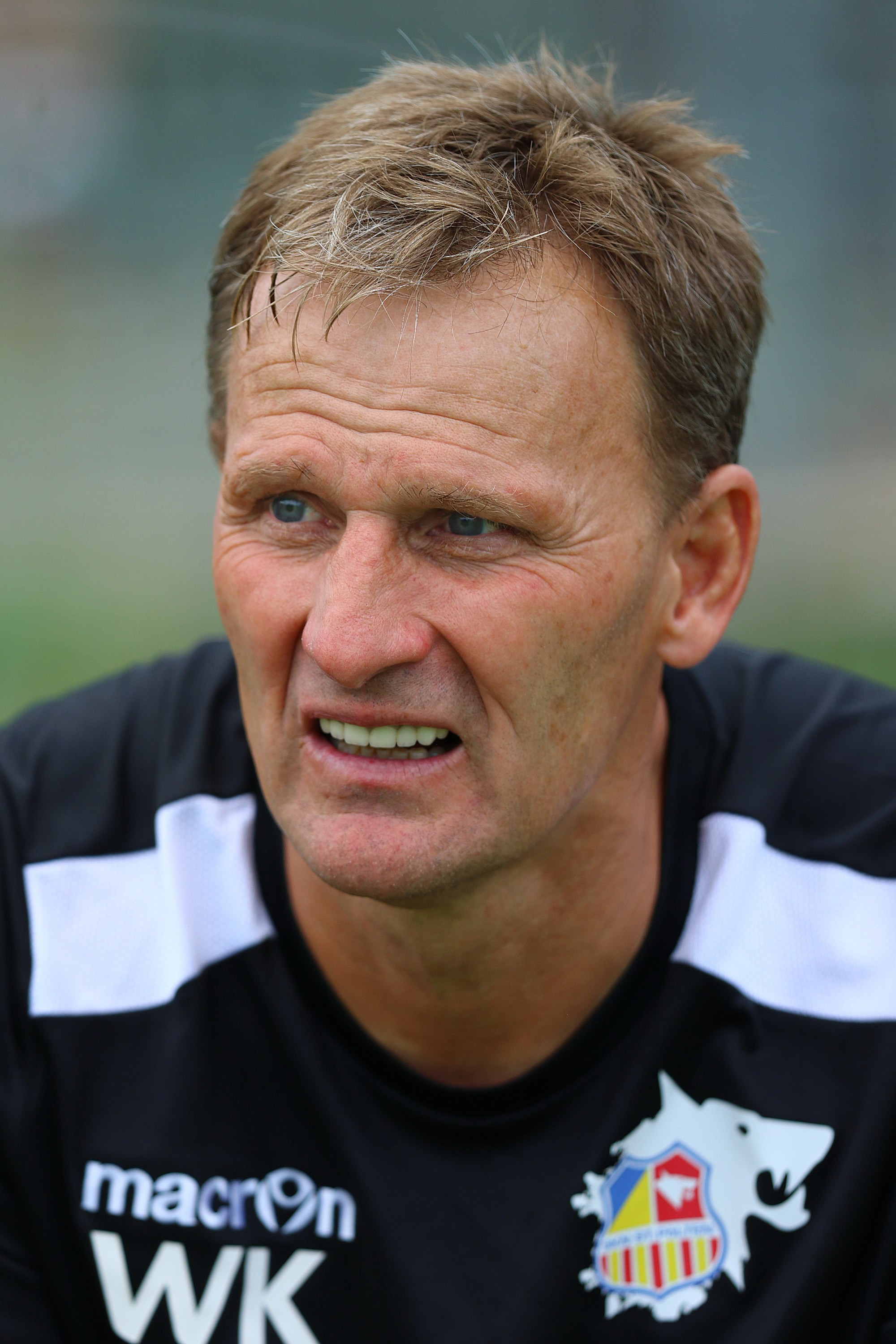
Wolfgang Knaller, 2018

- Otto Maria Polley, (DE Wiki) (1910–1984), writer
- Wolfgang Neumann (born 1945), an Austrian operatic heldentenor
- Herbert Gantschacher (born 1956), director, producer, writer
- Claudia Arpa (born 1967), politician (SPO) who was President of the country's Federal Council

=== Sport ===
- Wolfgang Knaller (born 1961), an Austrian football goalkeeper who played over 420 games
- Klaus Rohseano (born 1969), a retired Austrian footballer who played over 310 games
- Siegfried Grabner (born 1975), snowboarder, bronze medallist at the 2006 Winter Olympics
