= Himmelberg =

Municipality in Carinthia, Austria

- Municipality
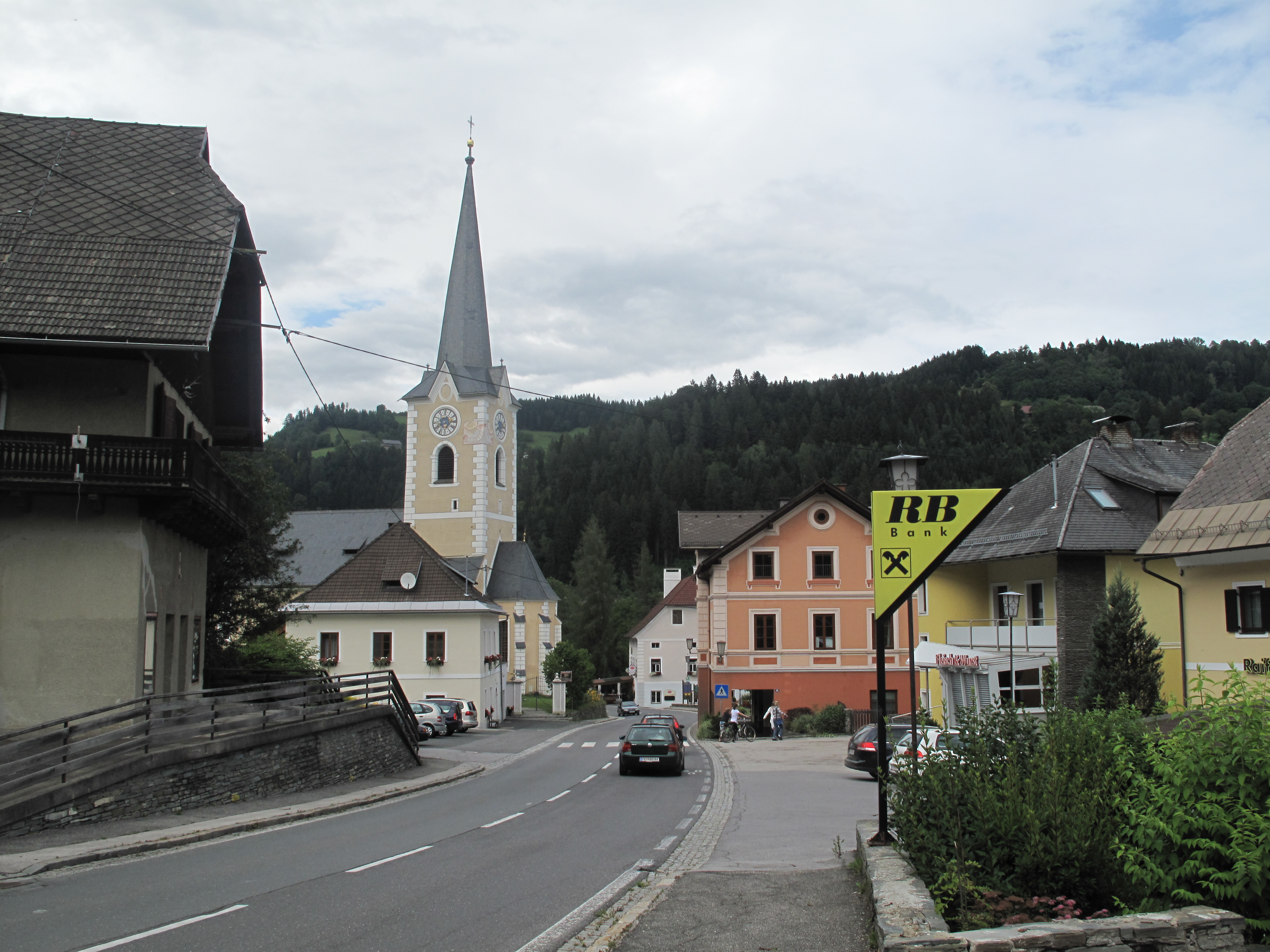

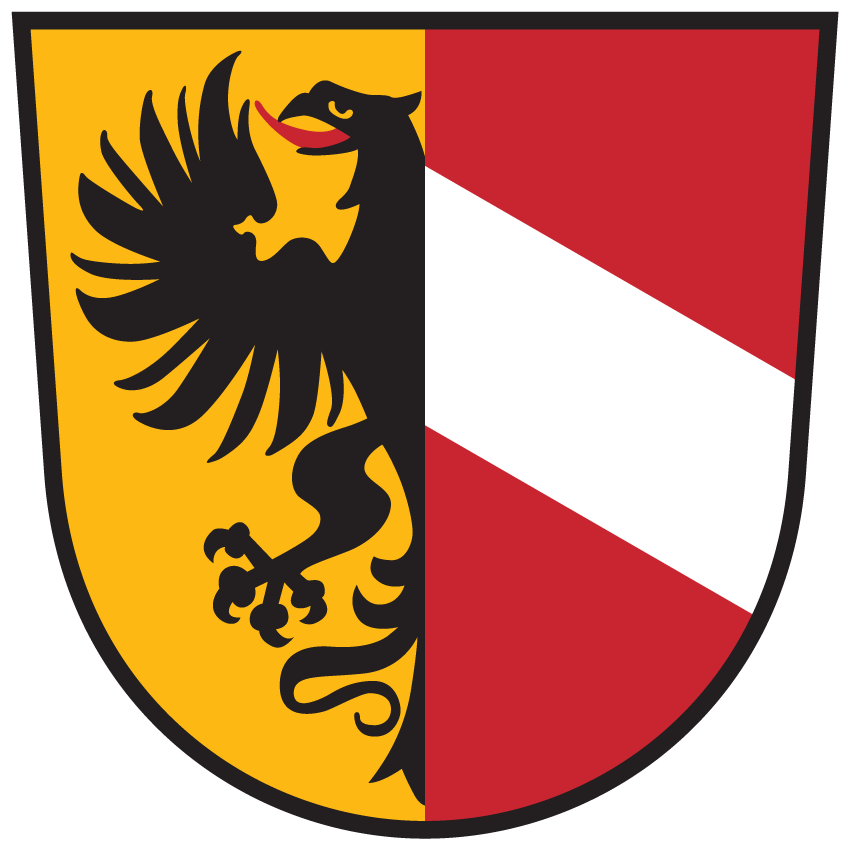
- Coat of arms

- Location within Austria
- Coordinates: 46°45′N 14°2′E
- Country: Austria
- State: Carinthia
- District: Feldkirchen

Government
  - Mayor: Heimo Rinösl

Area
  - Total: 56.85 km^{2} (21.95 sq mi)
- Elevation: 672 m (2,205 ft)

Population (2018-01-01)
  - Total: 2,287
  - Density: 40.23/km^{2} (104.2/sq mi)
- Time zone: UTC+1 (CET)
  - Summer (DST): UTC+2 (CEST)
- Postal code: 9562
- Website: www.himmelberg.at

Himmelberg is a municipality with 2273 inhabitants in the district of Feldkirchen in the Austrian state of Carinthia in Austria.

== Geography ==
Himmelberg lies in the center of Carinthia northwest of Feldkirchen. It lies in the Tiebel valley. The highest point in the municipality is the Hoferalmkopf (el. ca. 1600 ) in the northwest. The lowest point is the Tiebel (el. 625) in the south of the municipality.

== Neighboring municipalities ==
Gnesau	Steuerberg
Arriach
Steindorf	Feldkirchen in Kärnten
