= Treffen am Ossiacher See =

Treffen am Ossiacher See Treffen am Ossiacher See
- Municipality
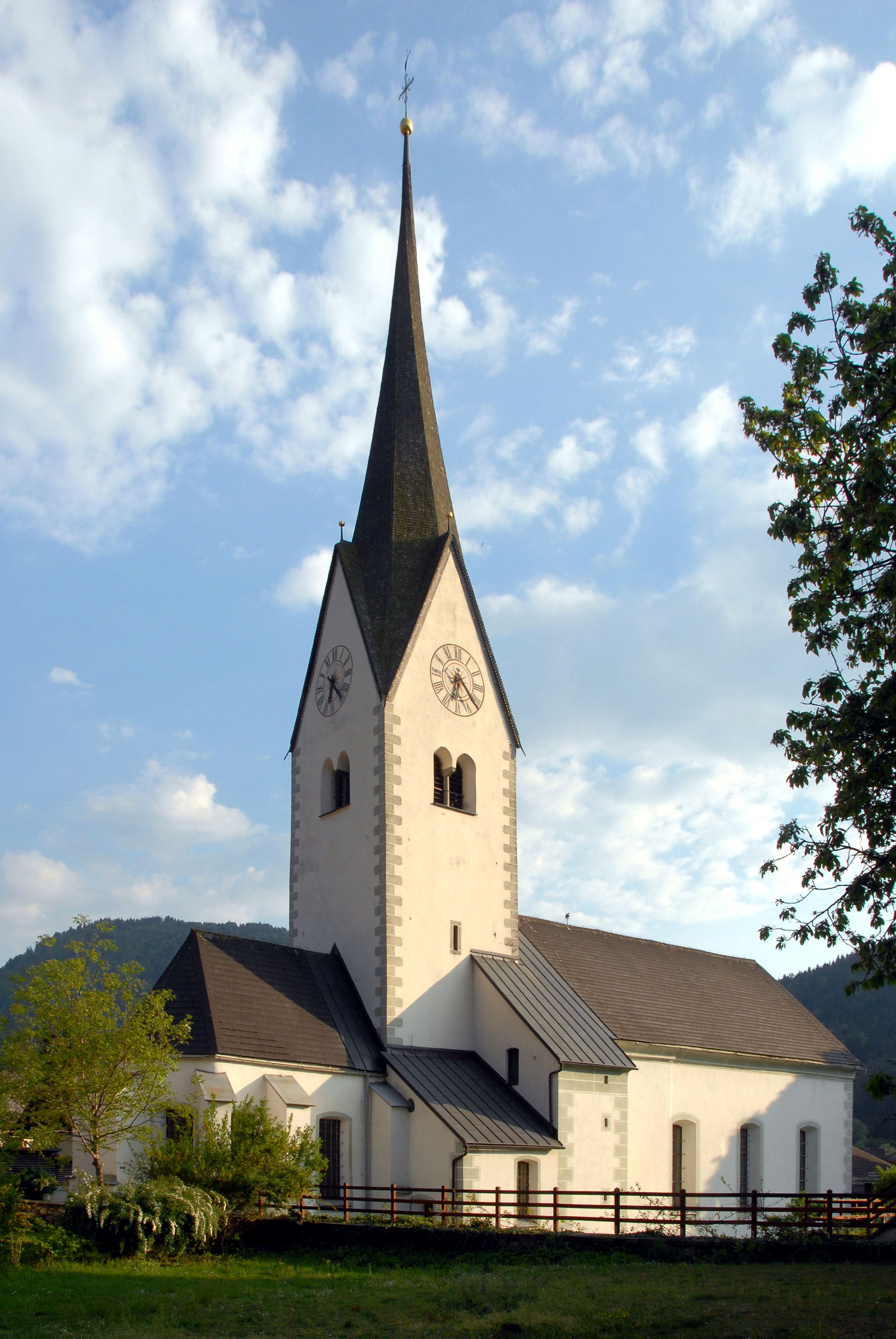
- Saint Maximilian Church

- Coat of arms

- Location within Austria
- Coordinates: 46°40′N 13°51′E
- Country: Austria
- State: Carinthia
- District: Villach-Land

Government
  - Mayor: Klaus Glanznig (SPÖ)

Area
  - Total: 71.09 km^{2} (27.45 sq mi)
- Elevation: 542 m (1,778 ft)

Population (2018-01-01)
  - Total: 4,455
  - Density: 62.67/km^{2} (162.3/sq mi)
- Time zone: UTC+1 (CET)
  - Summer (DST): UTC+2 (CEST)
- Postal code: 9521
- Area code: 04248
- Website: www.treffen.at

Treffen am Ossiacher See (Slovene: Trebinje) is a market town in the district of Villach-Land in Carinthia in south-central Austria.

== Geography ==
The municipality lies about 8 km north of Villach.
