= Ferndorf =

- Municipality
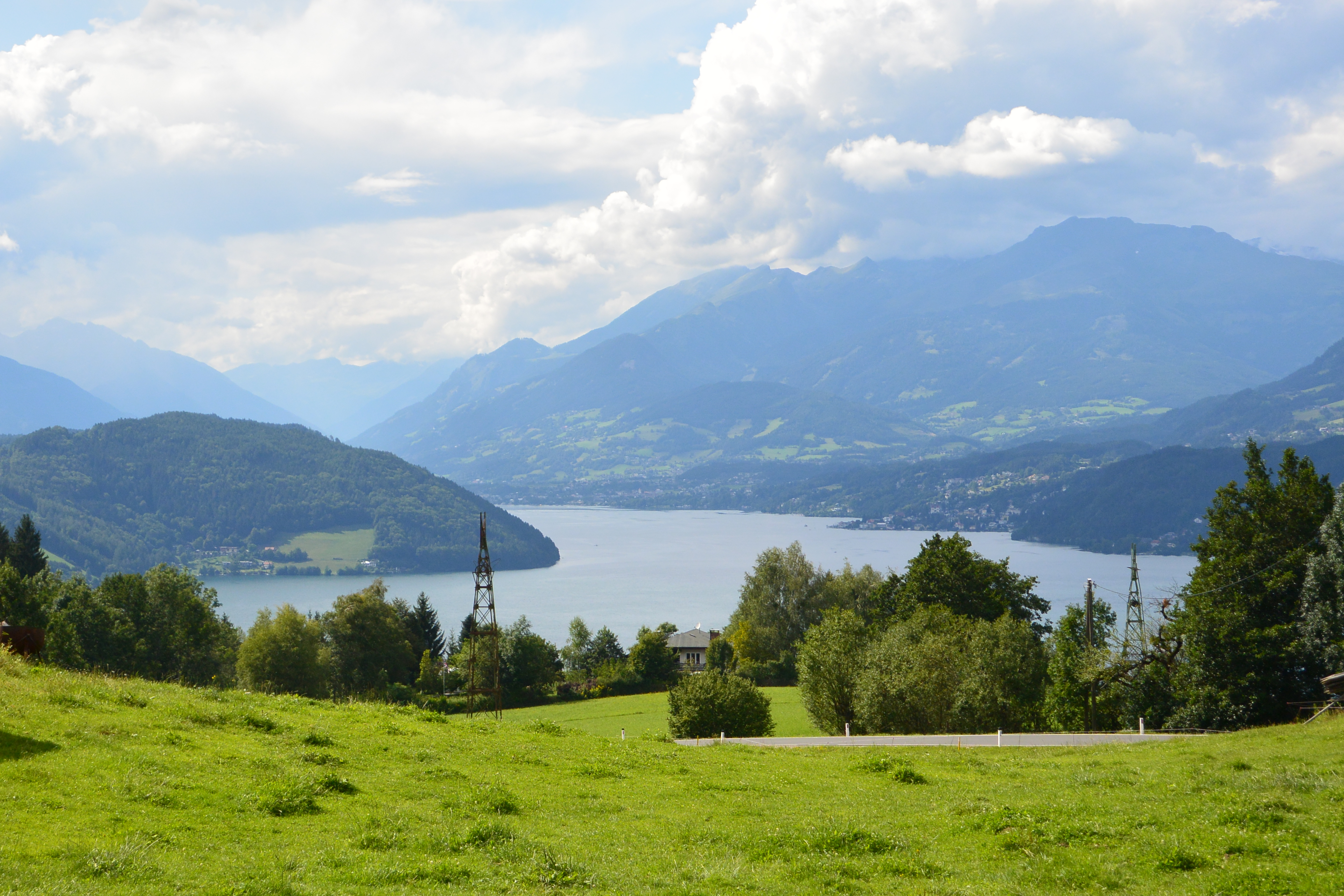
- View to Lake Millstatt

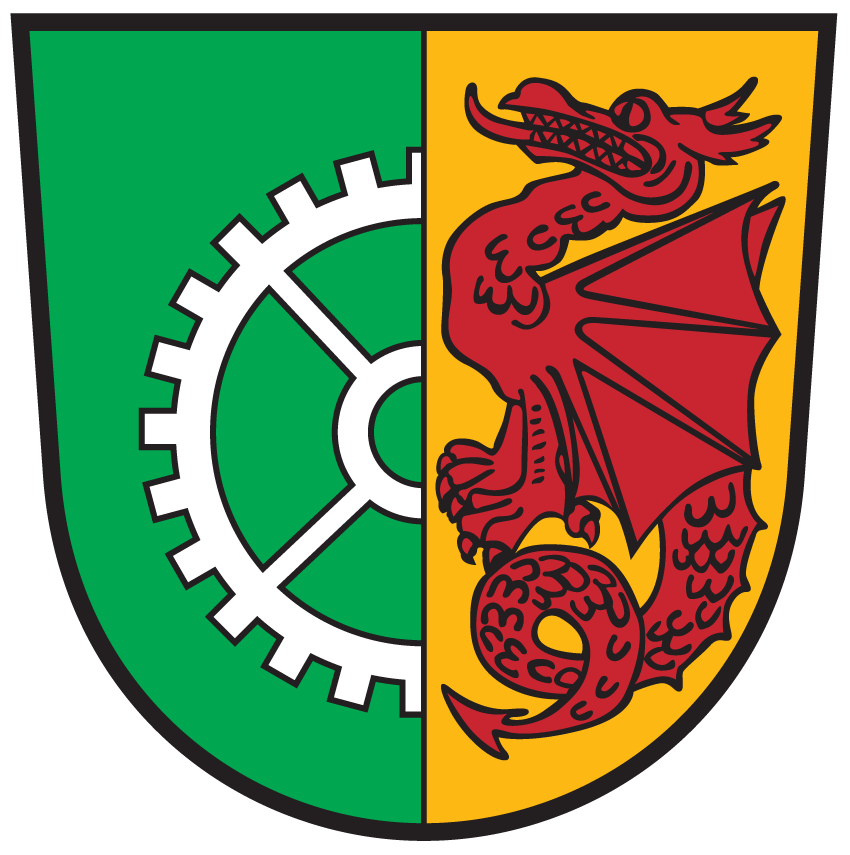
- Coat of arms

- Location within Austria
- Coordinates: 46°44′N 13°38′E
- Country: Austria
- State: Carinthia
- District: Villach-Land

Government
  - Mayor: Josef Haller (SPÖ)

Area
  - Total: 31.36 km^{2} (12.11 sq mi)
- Elevation: 560 m (1,840 ft)

Population (2018-01-01)
  - Total: 2,156
  - Density: 68.75/km^{2} (178.1/sq mi)
- Time zone: UTC+1 (CET)
  - Summer (DST): UTC+2 (CEST)
- Postal code: 9702
- Area code: 04245
- Website: www.ferndorf.gv.at

Ferndorf is a municipality in the district of Villach-Land in the Austrian state of Carinthia.

== Geography ==
The municipal area stretches from the Drava Valley up to the Mirnock range, part of the Nock Mountains, and the southeastern shore of Millstätter See. It comprises the cadastral communities of Ferndorf and Gschriet, made up of numerous scattered settlements and farmsteads.

Original an agricultural area, the population today largely depends on the magnesite works in nearby Radenthein and on summer tourism. The municipality has access to the Tauern Autobahn (A10) running through the Drava valley and to the parallel railway line from Villach to Spittal an der Drau at Ferndorf station.

=== Neighbouring municipalities ===
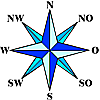
Millstatt		Radenthein
Spittal an der Drau		Feld am See
Stockenboi	Paternion	Fresach

== History ==
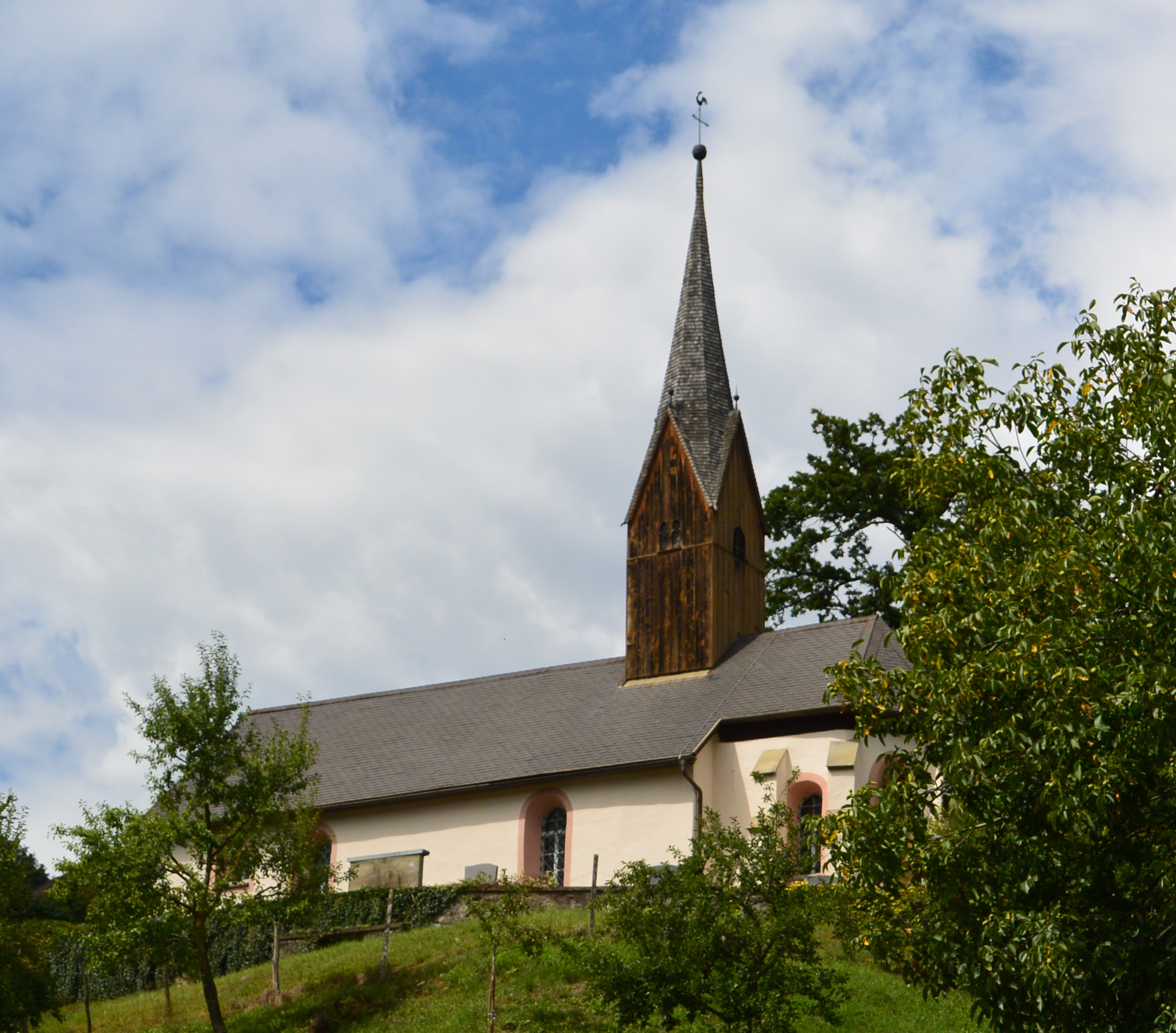
St Paul's Church

Vedendorf in the Duchy of Carinthia was first mentioned in a 1391 deed. The present-day parish church of St Paul's is documented since 1438.

The Ferndorf municipality was established after the March Revolution in 1850. From 1865 to 1906 it was incorporated into the neighbouring market town of Paternion.

== Politics ==
Seats in the municipal assembly (Gemeinderat) as of 2015 local elections:

- Social Democratic Party of Austria (SPÖ): 11
- Freedom Party of Austria: 7
- Austrian People's Party: 1

== Twin town ==
Ferndorf is twinned with:

- Ferndorf, Kreuztal, Germany
- Nauen, Germany
- Skoczów, Poland
