= Weißenstein =

- Municipality
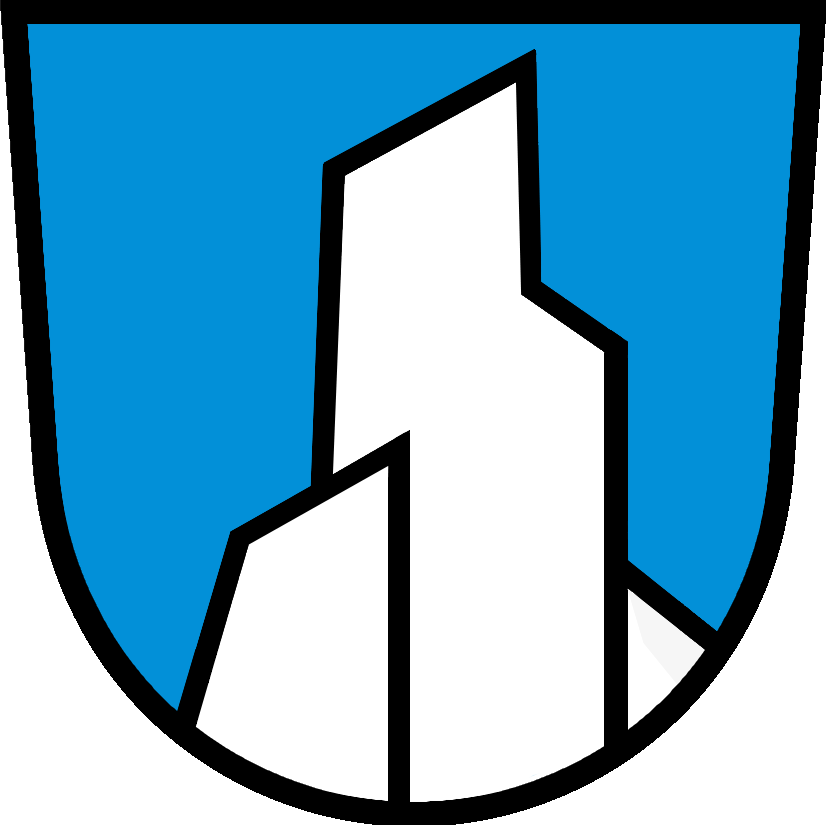
- Coat of arms

- Location within Austria
- Coordinates: 46°41′N 13°43′E
- Country: Austria
- State: Carinthia
- District: Villach-Land

Government
  - Mayor: Hermann Moser

Area
  - Total: 49.14 km^{2} (18.97 sq mi)
- Elevation: 559 m (1,834 ft)

Population (2018-01-01)
  - Total: 2,961
  - Density: 60.26/km^{2} (156.1/sq mi)
- Time zone: UTC+1 (CET)
  - Summer (DST): UTC+2 (CEST)
- Postal code: 9550, 9710, 9721, 9722
- Area code: 04245
- Website: www.weissenstein.at

Weißenstein (Slovene: Belšak) is a town in the district of Villach-Land in the Austrian state of Carinthia.

== Geography ==
Weißenstein lies in the lower Drau valley northwest of Villach. The highest point in the municipality is the Spitzeck at 1517 m, and the lowest at 500 m.

== Sights ==
The scenery around Weißenstein has been attracting artists for years, and their work is presented in the town's Wachaumuseum. The other main attraction is its Church of the Virgin Mary, on a hilltop to protect against the Turks.

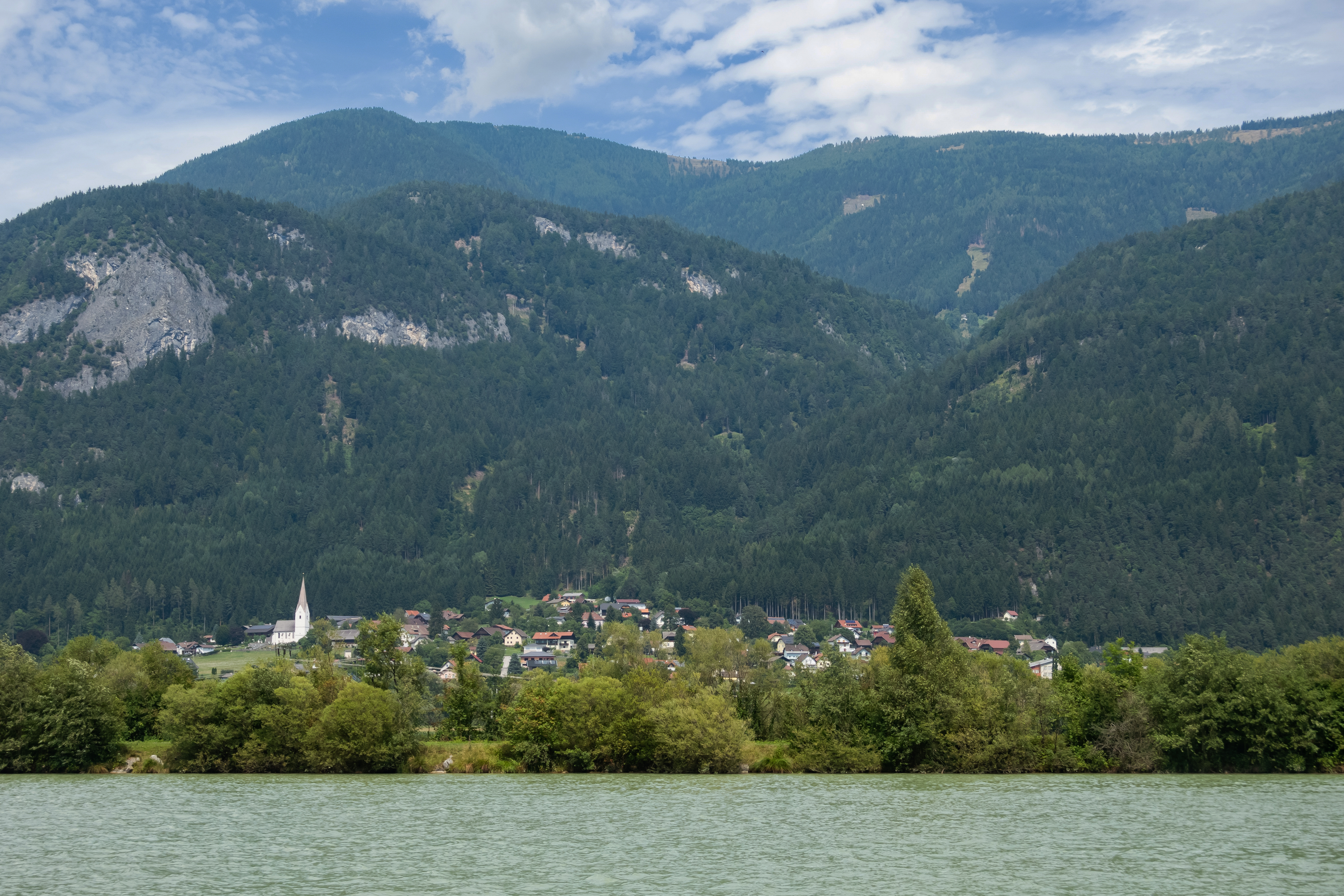
View to Weissenstein from Kellerberg
