= Burgruine Griffen =

Castle in Austria

Griffen Castle
- Griffen, Austria
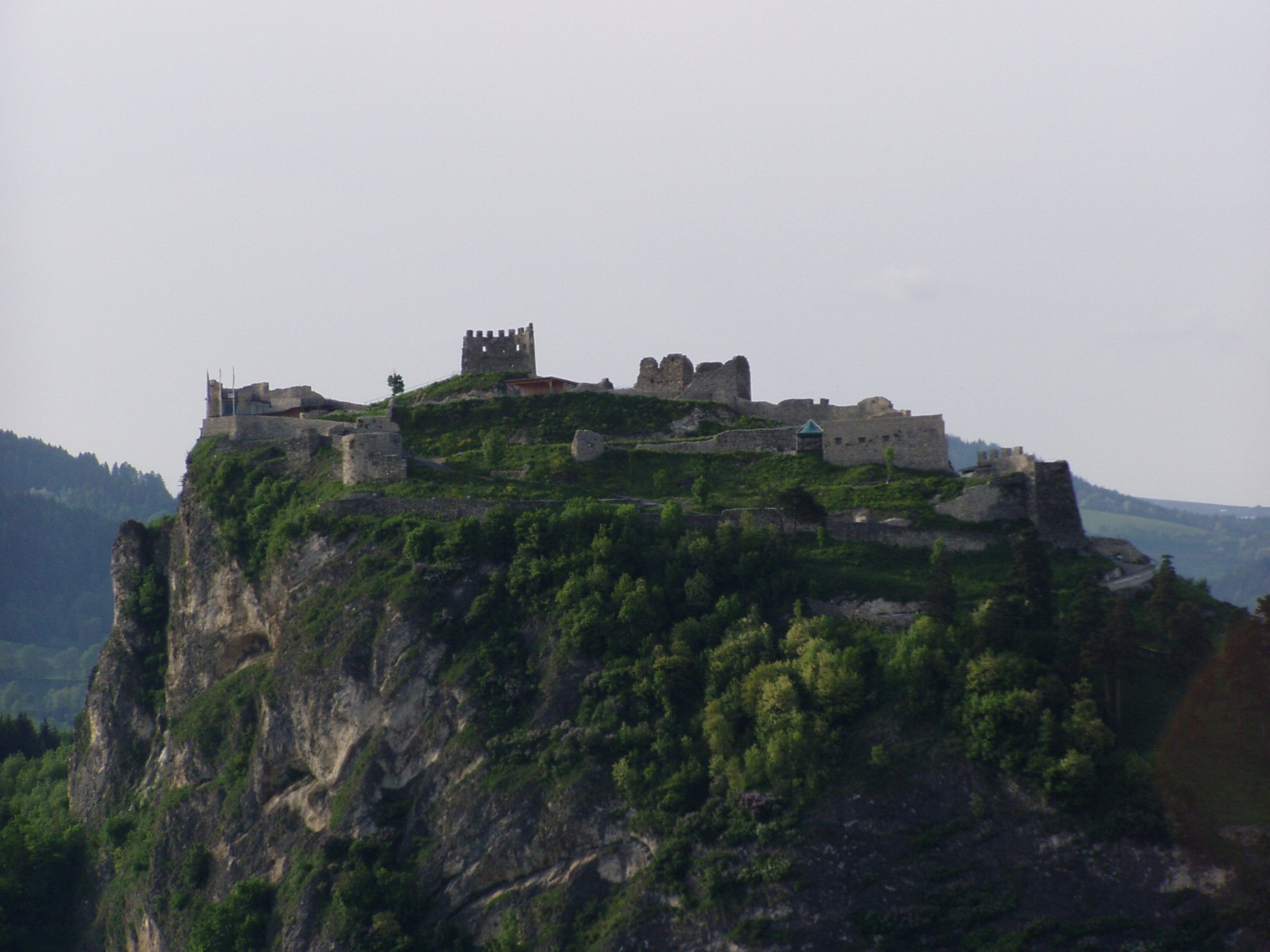

Site information
- Type: Castle
- Owner: Market Town of Griffen
- Open to the public: yes
- Condition: ruins

Location
- Coordinates: 46°42′19″N 14°43′39″E

Site history
- Built: 1124-1146
- Built by: Otto of Bamberg
- In use: until 1768
- Demolished: 1840
- Battles/wars: 1292-1293 occupied by Count Ulrich von Heunberg

The Burg Griffen is a castle on a 130m/427 ft-high limestone mountain above the town of Griffen in the Austrian state of Carinthia.

== History ==
The castle was built between 1124 and 1146 by order of Bishop Otto of Bamberg. In an 1160 deed, Emperor Friedrich I mentioned Grivena as a Bamberg property.

In 1292 the Carinthian nobleman Count Ulrich von Heunburg with support of Archbishop Konrad IV of Salzburg occupied the fort in an uprising against Albert of Habsburg, the son of King Rudolph I of Germany and Duke Meinhard II. However Ulrich was abandoned by his allies and one year later had to leave the castle. In 1759 Bishop Adam Friedrich sold the Bamberg estates in Carinthia to Maria Theresa of Austria and the castle was incorporated into the Carinthian duchy.

About 1520 a large reconstruction of the castle took place as a protection against the threat posed by the Ottoman forces with a base amounted of about 4000 m^{2}, though the Turks never laid siege to Griffen.

== Cave ==
Within the mountain is the Griffener Tropfsteinhöhle (dripstone cave) with a length of 485m/1591 ft, which was not discovered until the late days of World War II. It is open to public and a natural landmark since 1957.
