= Bad Bleiberg =

Bad Bleiberg Plajberk pri Beljaku
- Municipality
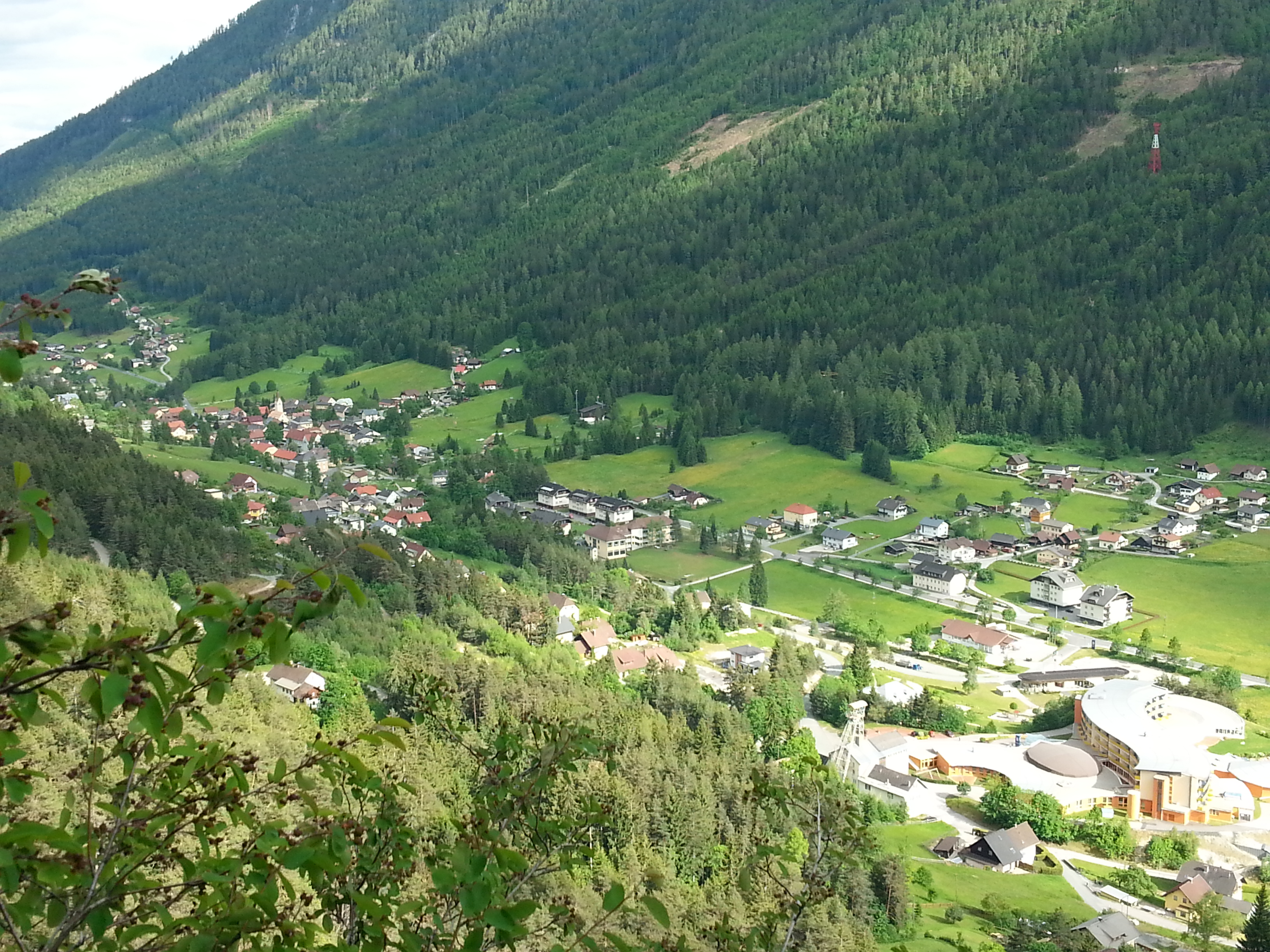

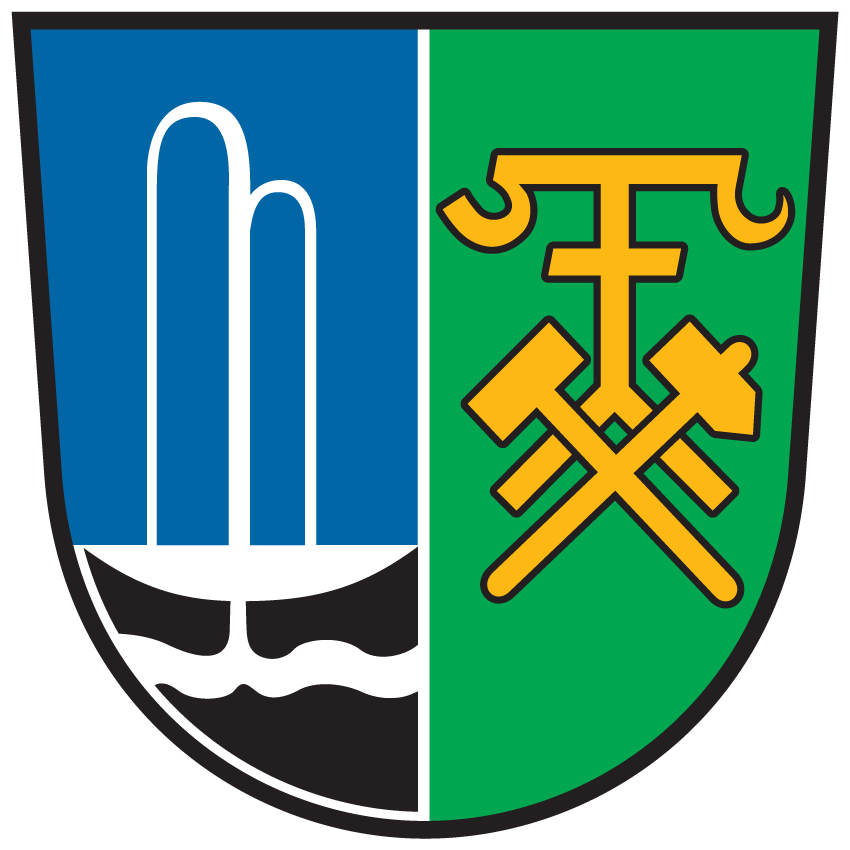
- Coat of arms

- Location within Austria
- Coordinates: 46°37′29″N 13°41′09″E
- Country: Austria
- State: Carinthia
- District: Villach-Land

Government
  - Mayor: Christian Hecher (Ind.)

Area
  - Total: 44.81 km^{2} (17.30 sq mi)
- Elevation: 902 m (2,959 ft)

Population (2018-01-01)
  - Total: 2,283
  - Density: 50.95/km^{2} (132.0/sq mi)
- Time zone: UTC+1 (CET)
  - Summer (DST): UTC+2 (CEST)
- Postal code: 9530, 9531
- Area code: 04244
- Website: www.bad-bleiberg.at

Bad Bleiberg (Slovene: Plajberk pri Beljaku) is a market town in the district of Villach-Land, in Carinthia, Austria. Originally a mining area, especially for lead (German: Blei), Bad Bleiberg today due to its hot springs is a spa town.

== Geography ==
Bad Bleiberg is situated west of the district's capital Villach in a high valley on the northern slope of the Dobratsch (Villacher Alpe) massif, the easternmost part of the Gailtal Alps mountain range.

The municipal area comprises the cadastral communities of Bleiberg proper and Kreuth.

== History ==
King Henry II of Germany granted the Carinthian lands around Villach to the newly created Diocese of Bamberg at the Frankfurt synod of 1 November 1007, together with other estates like Griffen or the Canal Valley around Tarvisio. When under Emperor Frederick II Bamberg was elevated to a Prince-Bishopric, the territories became ecclesiastical exclaves within the territory of the Carinthian dukes. In 1759 the Bamberg estates were finally acquired by Empress Maria Theresa and incorporated into Habsburg Carinthia.

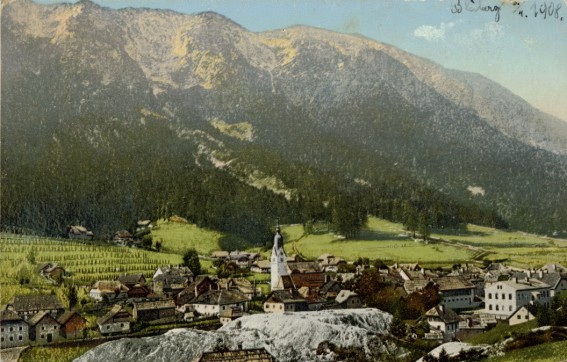
Bad Bleiberg with Dobratsch massif, 1908 postcard

The mine was first mentioned as Pleyberg in a 1333 deed issued by the Bamberg bishops; it was operated by the Swabian Fugger family from the late 15th century onwards. Georgius Agricola described the mining and smelting of lead and zinc in his 1556 book De re metallica. Mining operations ceased in 1993 for economic reasons, today a tourist mine offers guided underground tours.

The current municipality was established in 1850, it received the status of a market town in 1930. When in 1951 a hot spring had flooded an adit, a public bath was established and Bleiberg received the official Bad title of a spa town in 1978.

== Politics ==
The municipal assembly (Gemeinderat) consists of 19 members. Since the 2021 local elections, it is made up of the following parties:

- Independent List Bad Bleiberg (ULB): 12 seats
- Social Democratic Party of Austria (SPÖ): 4 seats
- Freedom Party of Austria (FPÖ): 2 seats
- Verantwortung Erde (ERDE): 1 seat

The mayor of the municipality, Christian Hecher, was also elected in 2021.

== Twin town ==
- Pradamano, Italy

== Notable people ==
Oskar Potiorek (1853–1933), Austro-Hungarian army officer
