= Rudolf Kattnigg =

Austrian composer, pianist and conductor

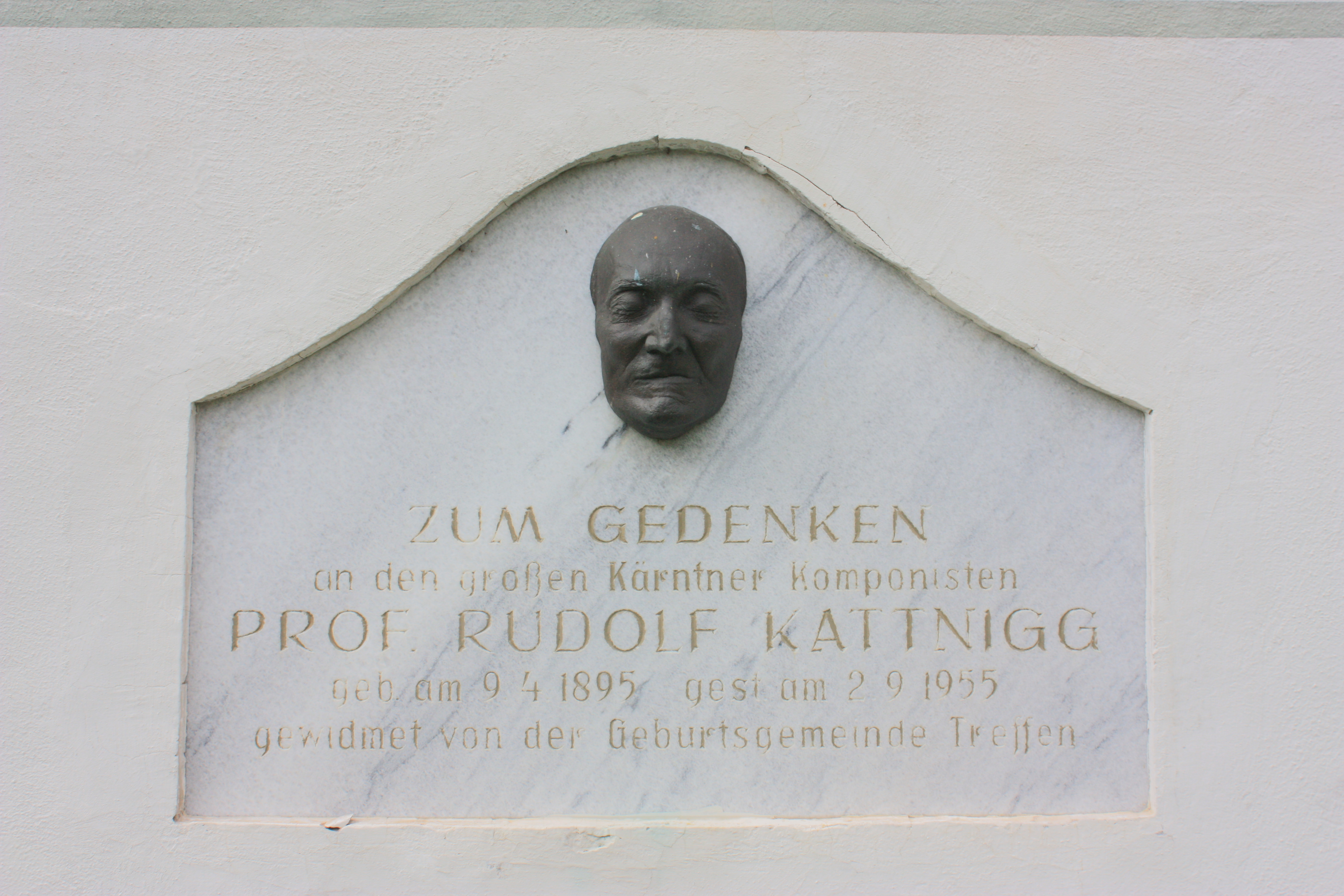
Memorial in Treffen

Rudolf Kattnigg (9 April 1895, in Carinthia – 2 September 1955, in Klagenfurt) was an Austrian composer, pianist and conductor.

== Life and career ==
Kattnigg studied composition under Joseph Marx at the Vienna State Academy for music and visual arts. After completing his music studies, he was given a post as a professor there in the 1920s. In 1928 he assumed the post of Director of the Innsbruck Conservatorium, as well as becoming the conductor of the symphony orchestra there. These jobs were interspersed with engagements in Vienna and Zürich.

His works include operettas, ballets, symphonies, songs, works for orchestra and choir, as well as film music. Characteristic features of his compositions are the instrumentation and the manipulation of melodies, songs and his native folk songs.

== Selected works ==
=== Operettas ===
- Der Prinz von Thule (1935) (The Prince of Thule)
- Balkanliebe (1936) (Balkan Love)
- Mädels vom Rhein (Rhinemaidens)
- Donna Miranda
- Kaiserin Katharina (1935) (Empress Catherine)
- Bel Ami (1949)

=== Other works ===
- Slowenische Tänze (Slovenian Dances)
- Piano Concerto (1934, published 1936)
