= Hohenthurn =

Hohenthurn Straja vas
- Municipality
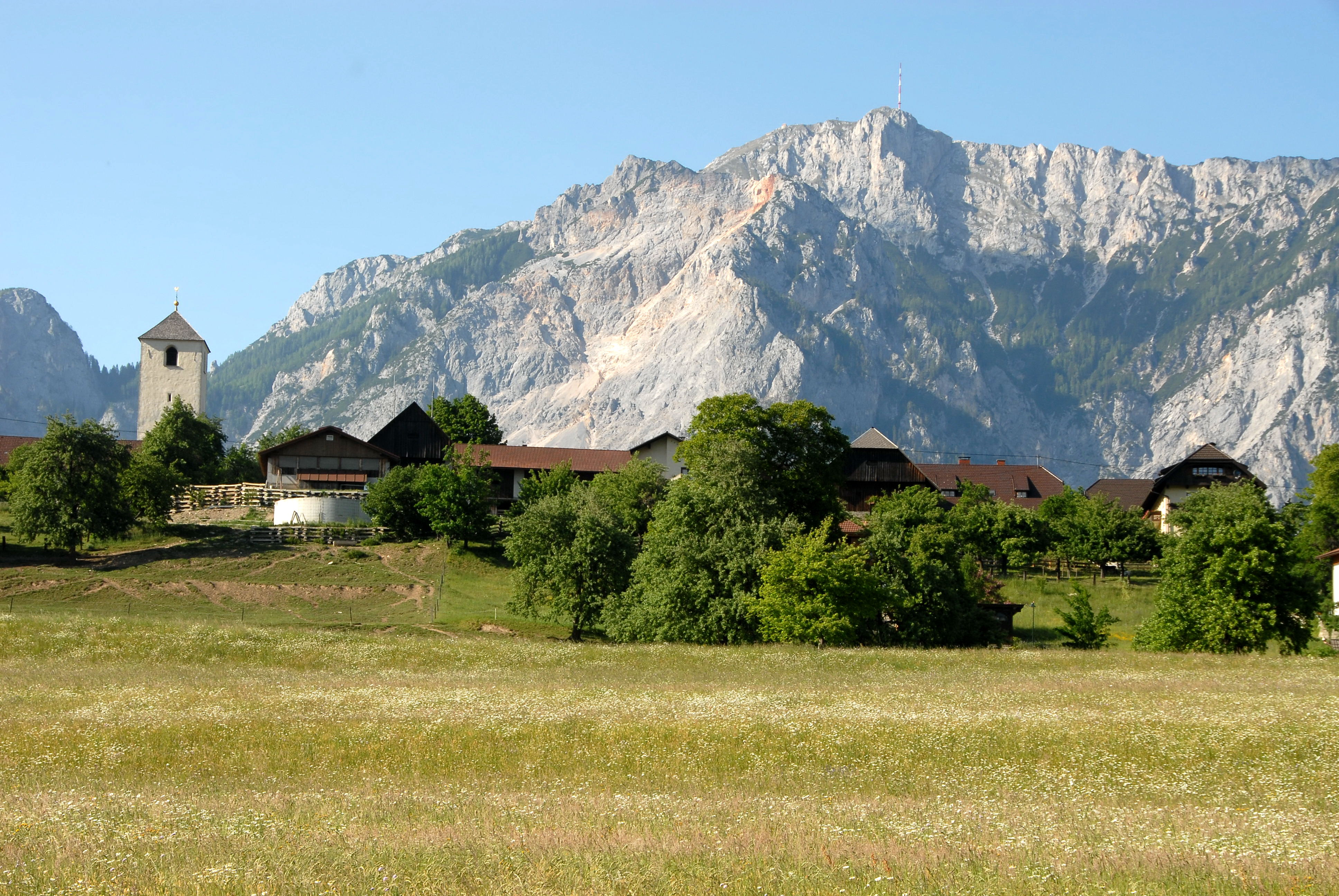
- St Cyriacus Church and Dobratsch massif

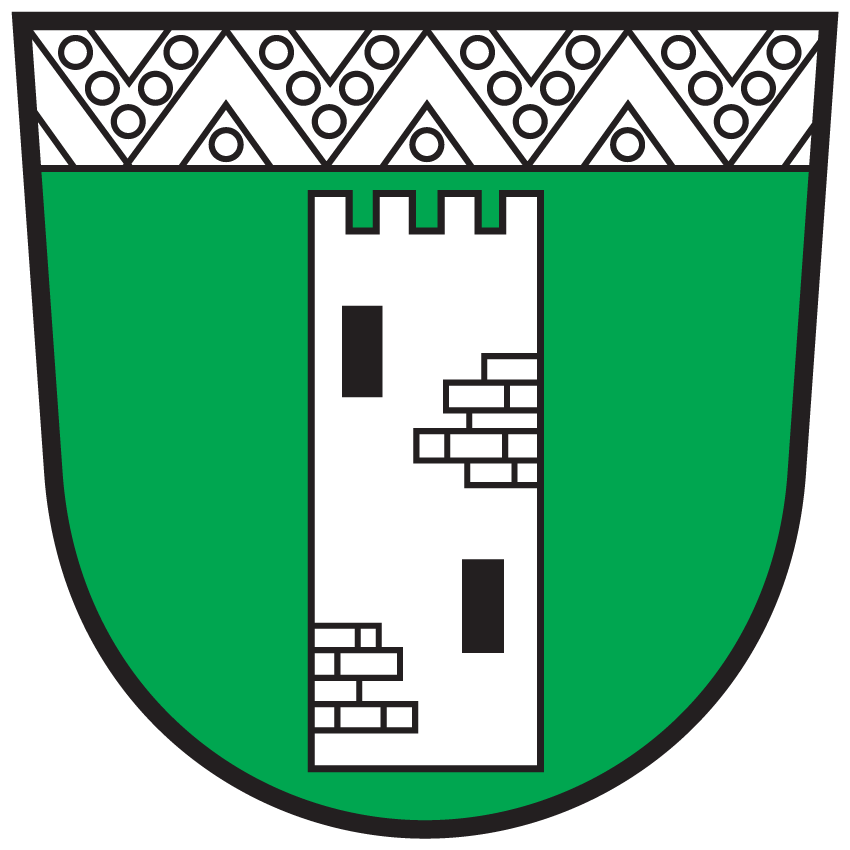
- Coat of arms

- Location within Austria
- Coordinates: 46°34′N 13°38′E
- Country: Austria
- State: Carinthia
- District: Villach-Land

Government
  - Mayor: Florian Tschinderle (ÖVP)

Area
  - Total: 27.18 km^{2} (10.49 sq mi)
- Elevation: 620 m (2,030 ft)

Population (2018-01-01)
  - Total: 851
  - Density: 31.3/km^{2} (81.1/sq mi)
- Time zone: UTC+1 (CET)
  - Summer (DST): UTC+2 (CEST)
- Postal code: 9613
- Area code: 04256
- Website: hohenthurn.gv.at

Hohenthurn (Slovene: Straja vas) is a municipality in the district of Villach-Land in the Austrian state of Carinthia.

== Congregation structure ==
Hohenthurn consists of two cadastral communities, Dreulach and Hohenthurn, which comprise a total of the following six villages: (population status January 1, 2018)

- Achomitz (Zahomec) (90)
- Draschitz (Drašče) (189)
- Dreulach (Drevlje) (118)
- Göriach (Gorje) (99)
- Hohenthurn (Straja vas) (209)
- Stossau (Štasava) (146)

== Geography ==
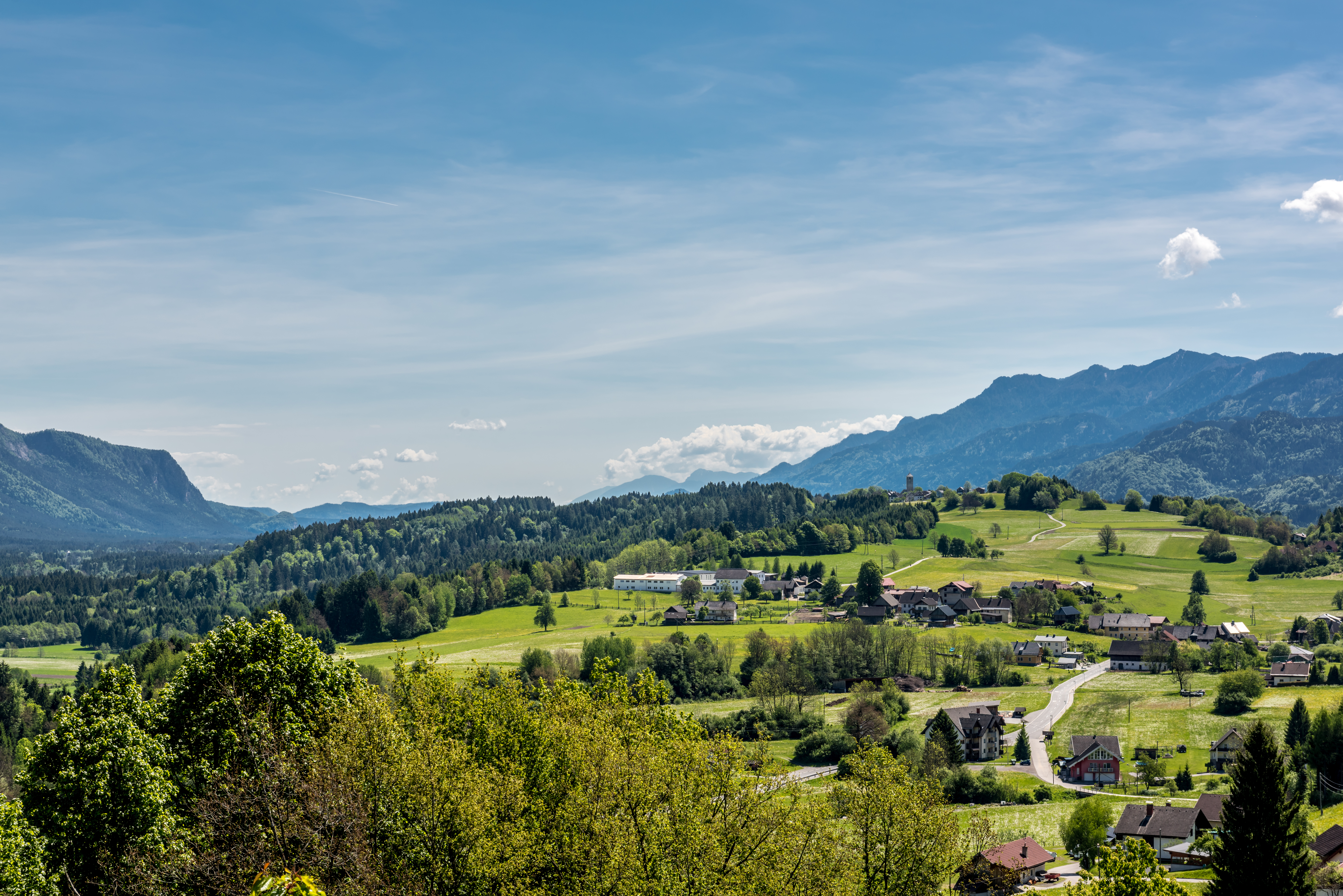
View over the Gail valley

Hohenthurn is located in the valley of the Gail river (Gailtal), near the confluence with the Gailitz tributary. The municipal area stretches on the northern slope of the Carnic Alps, close to the border with Italy. It comprises the cadastral communities of Hohenthurn proper and Dreulach (Drevlje).

According to a 2001 census, 8.3% of the population are Carinthian Slovenes, speaking the local Gail Valley dialect.

== History ==
The municipality was the site of a prehistoric Hallstatt settlement as well as of a Roman watchtower, which is depicted in the coat of arms. Nevertheless, Hohenthurn (from German hoher Turm, i.e. "high tower"), first mentioned in a 1253 deed, as Göströsdorf, probably derived its name from the steeple of the Gothic St. Cyriacus Church. Since the medieval Slavic settlement of the Eastern Alps, the area is a centre of Slovene tradition and customs.

== Politics ==
Seats in the municipal council (Gemeinderat) as of 2015 local elections:

- Austrian People's Party (ÖVP): 5
- Social Democratic Party of Austria (SPÖ): 3
- Community Voters (Enotna Lista): 2
- Freedom Party of Austria (FPÖ): 1

== International relations ==
=== Twin towns — Sister cities ===
Hohenthurn is twinned with:

- Moimacco, Italy since 2006

== Notable people ==
- Matija Majar (1809–1892), Carinthian Slovene priest and activist, served at the parish church in the hamlet of Göriach from 1851 until 1867
- Karl Schnabl (born 1954), ski jumper
