= Villach-Land District =

Coordinates: 46.624°N 13.724°E

Villach-Land District Bezirk Villach-Land
- District
- Country: Austria
- State: Carinthia
- Number of municipalities: 19
- Administrative seat: Villach

Government
  - District Governor: Otto Riepan (since 2016)

Area
  - Total: 1,009.3 km^{2} (389.7 sq mi)

Population (2024)
  - Total: 65,727
  - Density: 65.121/km^{2} (168.66/sq mi)
- Time zone: UTC+01:00 (CET)
  - Summer (DST): UTC+02:00 (CEST)
- Vehicle registration: VL
- NUTS code: AT211
- District code: 207

Bezirk Villach-Land is a district of the state of Carinthia in Austria.

== Municipalities ==
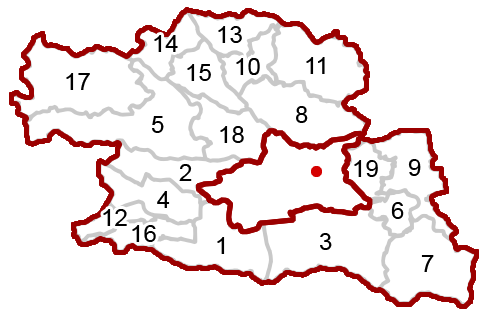

Towns (Städte) are indicated in boldface; market towns (Marktgemeinden) in italics; suburbs, hamlets and other subdivisions of a municipality are indicated in small characters.

- Arnoldstein (Slov.: Podklošter) (**1**)
  - Agoritschach, Arnoldstein, Erlendorf, Gailitz, Greuth, Hart, Hart, Krainberg, Krainegg, Lind, Maglern, Neuhaus an der Gail, Oberthörl, Pessendellach, Pöckau, Radendorf, Riegersdorf, Seltschach, St. Leonhard bei Siebenbrünn, Thörl-Maglern-Greuth, Tschau, Unterthörl
- Bad Bleiberg (Slov.: Plejberk pri Beljaku) (**2**)
  - Bad Bleiberg, Bleiberg-Kreuth, Bleiberg-Nötsch, Hüttendorf, Kadutschen
- Finkenstein am Faaker See (Slov.: Bekštanj) (**3**)
  - Altfinkenstein, Faak am See, Finkenstein, Fürnitz, Gödersdorf, Goritschach, Höfling, Kopein, Korpitsch, Latschach, Ledenitzen, Mallenitzen, Müllnern, Neumüllnern, Oberaichwald, Oberferlach, Outschena, Petschnitzen, Pogöriach, Ratnitz, Sigmontitsch, St. Job, Stobitzen, Susalitsch, Techanting, Unteraichwald, Unterferlach, Untergreuth
- Nötsch im Gailtal (Slov.: Čajna) (**4**)
  - Bach, Dellach, Emmersdorf, Förk, Glabatschach, Hermsberg, Kerschdorf, Kreublach, Kühweg, Labientschach, Michelhofen, Nötsch, Poglantschach, Saak, Semering, St. Georgen im Gailtal, Wertschach
- Paternion (Slov.: Špaterjan) (**5**)
  - Aifersdorf, Boden, Duel, Ebenwald, Feffernitz, Feistritz an der Drau, Feistritz an der Drau-Neusiedlung, Kamering, Kamering, Kreuzen, Mühlboden, Neu-Feffernitz, Nikelsdorf, Patendorf, Paternion, Pobersach, Pogöriach, Pöllan, Rubland, Tragail, Tragin
- Rosegg (Slov.: Rožek) (**6**)
  - Berg, Bergl, Buchheim, Dolintschach, Drau, Duel, Emmersdorf, Frög, Frojach, Kleinberg, Obergoritschach, Pirk, Raun, Rosegg, St. Johann, St. Lambrecht, St. Martin, Untergoritschach
- Sankt Jakob im Rosental (Slov.: Šentjakob v Rožu) (**7**)
  - Dragositschach, Dreilach, Feistritz, Fresnach, Frießnitz, Gorintschach, Greuth, Kanin, Längdorf, Lessach, Maria Elend, Mühlbach, Rosenbach, Schlatten, Srajach, St. Jakob im Rosental, St. Oswald, St. Peter, Tallach, Tösching, Winkl
- Treffen (Slov.: Trebinje) (**8**)
  - Annenheim, Äußere Einöde, Buchholz, Deutschberg, Eichholz, Görtschach, Innere Einöde, Kanzelhöhe, Köttwein, Kras, Lötschenberg, Niederdorf, Oberdorf, Ossiachberg, Pölling, Retzen, Sattendorf, Schloss Treffen, Seespitz, Stöcklweingarten, Töbring, Treffen, Tschlein, Verditz, Winklern
- Velden am Wörther See (Slov.: Vrba) (**9**)
  - Aich, Augsdorf, Bach, Dieschitz, Dröschitz, Duel, Fahrendorf, Göriach, Kantnig, Kerschdorf, Köstenberg, Kranzlhofen, Latschach, Lind ob Velden, Oberdorf, Oberjeserz, Oberwinklern, Pulpitsch, Rajach, Saisserach, Selpritsch, Sonnental, St. Egyden, Sternberg, Treffen, Unterjeserz, Unterwinklern, Velden am Wörther See, Weinzierl, Wurzen
- Afritz am See (Slov.: Zobrce) (**10**)
  - Afritz, Berg ob Afritz, Gassen, Kraa, Lierzberg, Möderboden, Scherzboden, Tassach, Tauchenberg, Tobitsch
- Arriach (Slov.: Arjoh) (**11**)
  - Arriach, Berg ob Arriach, Dreihofen, Hinterbuchholz, Hinterwinkl, Hundsdorf, Innerteuchen, Laastadt, Oberwöllan, Sauboden, Sauerwald, Stadt, Unterwöllan, Vorderwinkl, Waldweg
- Feistritz an der Gail (Slov.: Bistrica na Zilji) (**12**)
- Feld am See (Slov.: Obernšec) (**13**)
  - Erlach, Feld am See, Feldpannalpe, Klamberg, Rauth, Schattseite, Untersee, Wiesen
- Ferndorf (Slov.: Perja vas) (**14**)
  - Beinten, Döbriach, Ferndorf, Glanz, Gschriet, Insberg, Lang, Politzen, Rudersdorf, Sonnwiesen, St. Jakob, St. Paul
- Fresach (Slov.: Brežnje) (**15**)
  - Amberg, Fresach, Laas, Mitterberg, Mooswald, Tragenwinkel
- Hohenthurn (Slov.: Straja vas) (**16**)
  - Achomitz, Draschitz, Dreulach, Göriach, Hohenthurn, Stossau
- Stockenboi (Slov.: Štokboj) (**17**)
  - Aichach, Alberden, Drußnitz, Gassen, Hammergraben, Hochegg, Hollernach, Liesing, Mauthbrücken, Mösel, Ried, Rosental, Scharnitzen, Seetal am Goldeck, Stockenboi, Tragail, Unteralm, Weißenbach, Wiederschwing, Ziebl, Zlan
- Weißenstein (Slov.: Bilšak) (**18**)
  - Gummern, Kellerberg, Lansach, Lauen, Puch, Stadelbach, Stuben, Töplitsch, Tscheuritsch, Uggowitz, Weißenbach, Weißenstein
- Wernberg (Slov.: Vernberk) (**19**)
  - Damtschach, Dragnitz, Duel, Föderlach I, Föderlach II, Goritschach, Gottestal, Kaltschach, Kantnig, Kletschach, Krottendorf, Lichtpold, Neudorf, Neudorf, Ragain, Sand, Schleben, Stallhofen, Sternberg, Terlach, Trabenig, Umberg, Wernberg, Wudmath, Zettin
