= Slovene field and house names =

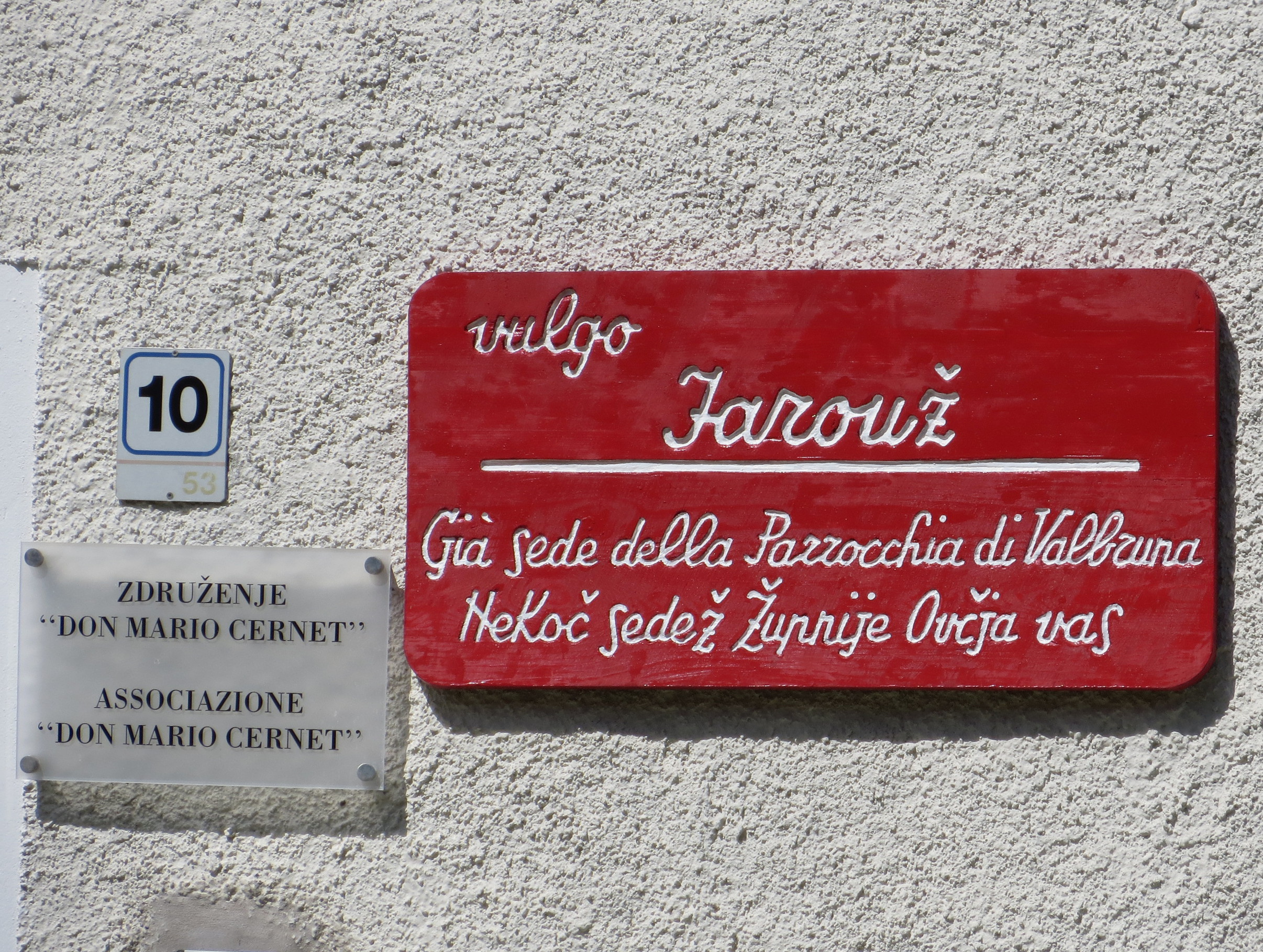
House name "Farouž" in Italy

The traditional Slovene field and house names are part of the cultural heritage of Slovenians, as well as of German-speaking population of Carinthia, Austria. Many researchers, communities, and organizations work for preservation of the Slovenian microtoponyms.

In 2010 the "Slovene field and house names in Carinthia" were included into the UNESCO Inventory of Intangible Cultural Heritage in Austria (de:Immaterielles Kulturerbe in Österreich). Preservation of Slovene placenames in this area is especially critical, because here for centuries the written language was German, while the tradition of Slovene was passed in spoken, dialectal form, and today only a small number of people use traditional names.

There is a Slovenia-Austria cross-border cooperation aimed at the preservation of the field and house names. First local initiatives started in Gorenjska region of Slovenia in 2005. In 2008 they were joined by Southern Carinthia. The European cross-border project FLU_LED (2011-2015) joined the two efforts into one. The two regions developed a common methodology for data collection and documentation (recording and mapping) and involved over 1,600 elderly people to collect the names. By 2020 15,700 house names and 9,600 field names were documented.

== See also ==
- de:Topographieverordnung für Kärnten (1977) (Topography Ordinance for Carinthia (1977))
