= Fresach =

- Municipality
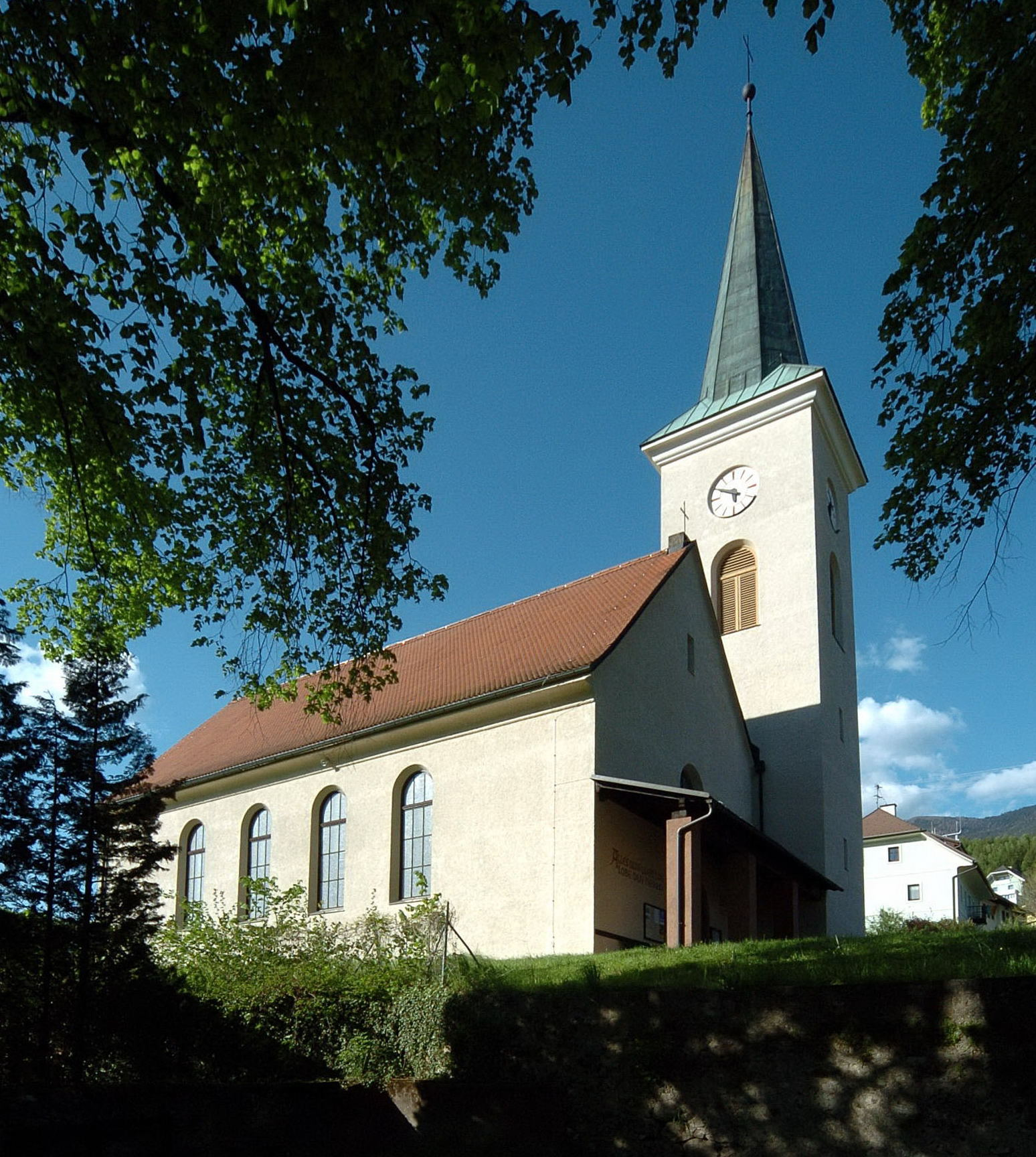
- Protestant church

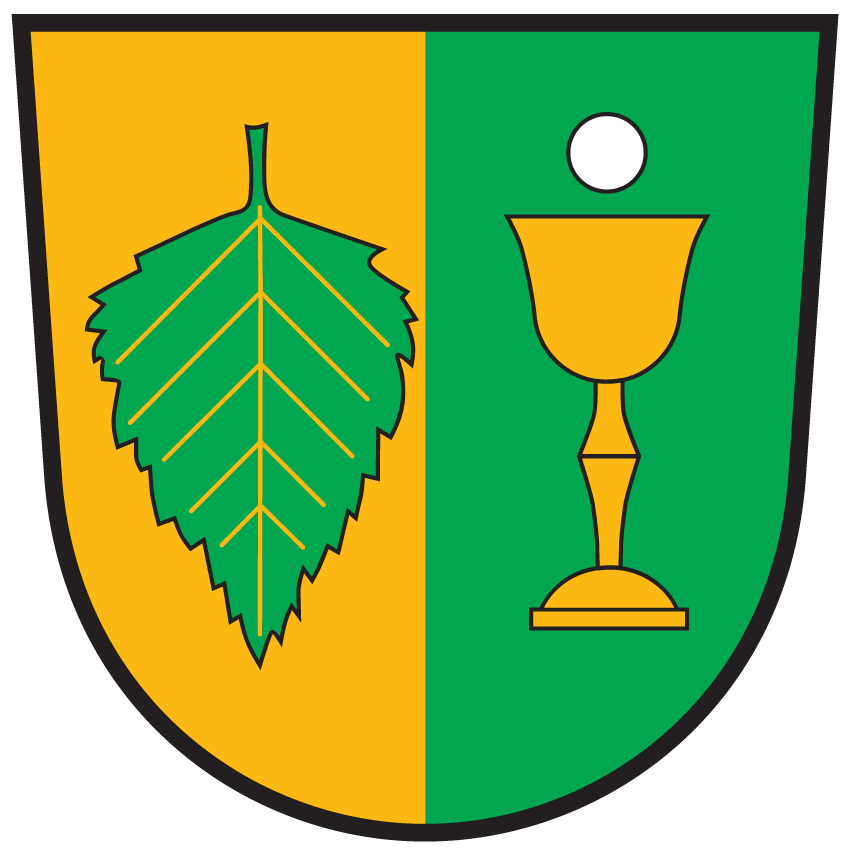
- Coat of arms

- Location within Austria
- Coordinates: 46°43′N 13°42′E
- Country: Austria
- State: Carinthia
- District: Villach-Land

Government
  - Mayor: Gerhard Altziebler (FPÖ)

Area
  - Total: 38.8 km^{2} (15.0 sq mi)
- Elevation: 715 m (2,346 ft)

Population (2018-01-01)
  - Total: 1,207
  - Density: 31.1/km^{2} (80.6/sq mi)
- Time zone: UTC+1 (CET)
  - Summer (DST): UTC+2 (CEST)
- Postal code: 9712
- Area code: 04256, 04245
- Website: www.fresach.at

Fresach (Slovene: Breze) is a municipality in Villach-Land District, in the Austrian state of Carinthia.

== Geography ==
The municipal area lies within the Nock Mountains (Mirnock massif) north of the Drava Valley. In the southwest, the Drava River forms the boundary with the market town of Paternion. It comprises the cadastral communities of Fresach, Moosach and Tragenwinkl. Fresach has achieved the status of a Luftkurort (air spa).

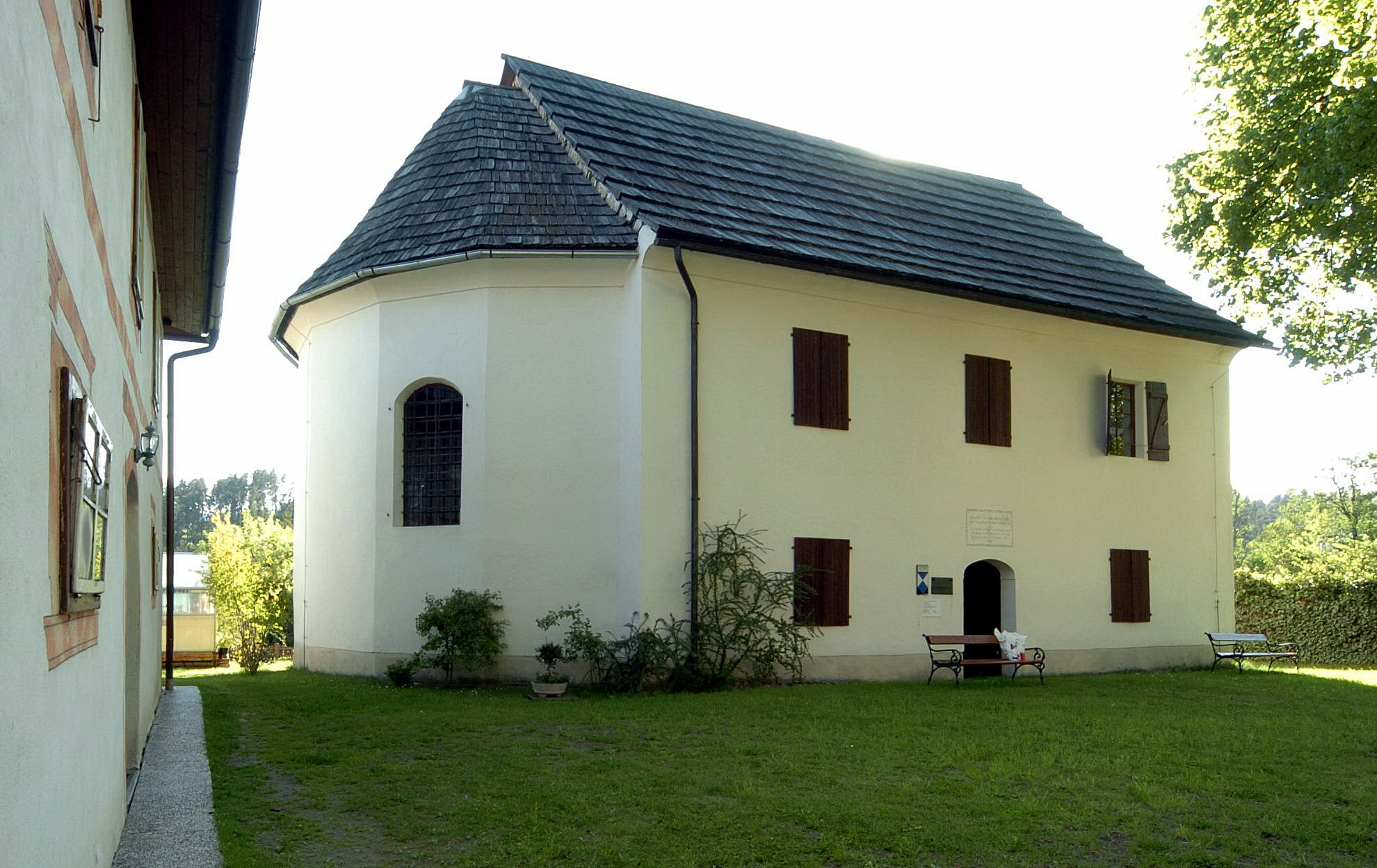
Diocese museum

About two-thirds of the local population profess Protestantism. A former prayer house erected in 1784 and preserved in its original condition is today the seat of a museum of the Lutheran diocese in Carinthia.

== History ==
Archaeological artifacts indicate a permanent settlement of the area since the Bronze Age. The Mirnock slopes were colonized by Alpine Slavs about 590, followed by Bavarian settlers in the 8th century. Part of the Imperial Duchy of Carinthia from 976, the estates were held by the local Counts of Ortenburg. A first Catholic church was erected in the 12th century, rebuilt after an Ottoman raid in 1478. The present-day Late Gothic building was finished in 1523.

While the Ortenburg heritage had passed to the Austrian House of Habsburg, the majority of the local population turned Protestant in the early 16th century. Though subjected to the stern measures of the Counter-Reformation under the rule of the Inner Austrian archduke (and later emperor) Ferdinand II (1590–1637), Fresach remained a centre of Crypto-protestantism. Not until the 1781 Patent of Toleration issued by Emperor Joseph II a Protestant parish was established. The Protestant church was built in 1949–51.

The community of Fresach was founded in 1849, it merged with neighbouring Moosach in 1963 to form the present-day municipality.

== Politics ==
Seats in the municipal assembly (Gemeinderat) as of 2009 elections:

- Freedom Party of Austria (FPÖ): 7
- Social Democratic Party of Austria (SPÖ): 6
- Austrian People's Party (ÖVP): 2

== Notable people ==
- Franz Klammer (born 1953), alpine ski racer
