= Stockenboi =

- Municipality
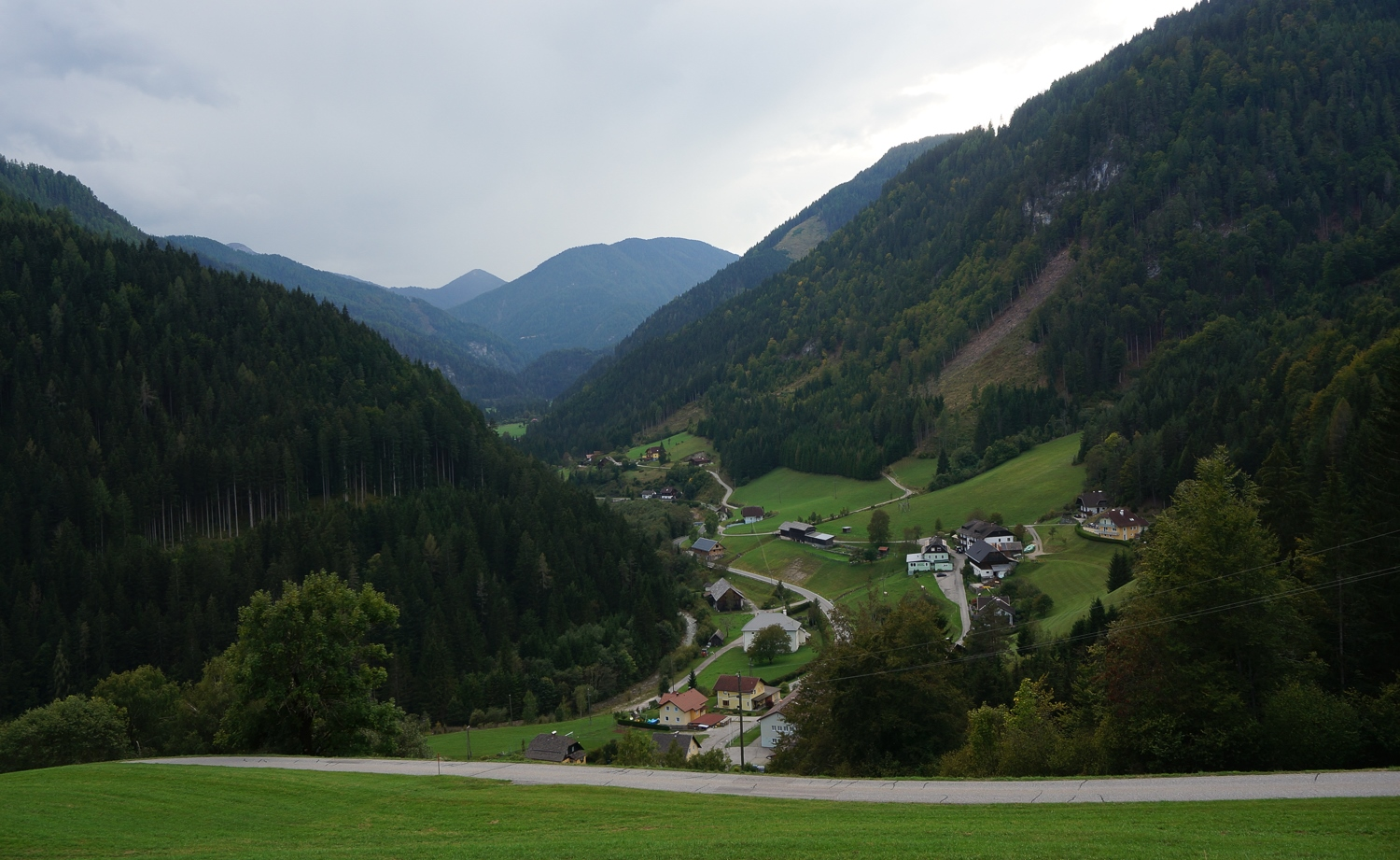
- View of Stockenboi

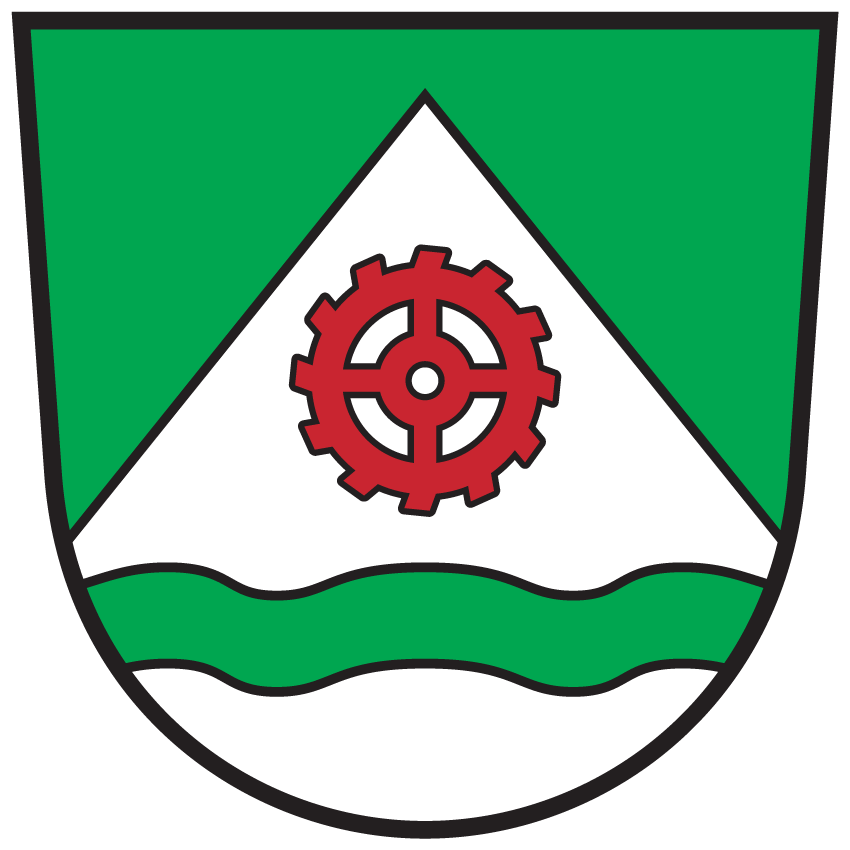
- Coat of arms

- Location within Austria
- Coordinates: 46°44′N 13°35′E
- Country: Austria
- State: Carinthia
- District: Villach-Land

Government
  - Mayor: Hans-Jörg Kerschbaumer (FPÖ)

Area
  - Total: 100.19 km^{2} (38.68 sq mi)
- Elevation: 795 m (2,608 ft)

Population (2025)
  - Total: 1,556
  - Density: 15.53/km^{2} (40.22/sq mi)
- Time zone: UTC+1 (CET)
  - Summer (DST): UTC+2 (CEST)
- Postal code: 9714
- Area code: 04761
- Website: www.stockenboi.at

Stockenboi is a municipality in the district of Villach-Land in the Austrian state of Carinthia.

== Geography ==
The municipal area is situated in a valley of the Gailtal Alps, stretching from the Drava River up to Lake Weissensee. It comprises the cadastral communities Stockenboi, Tragail, Wiederschwing, and Ziebl.

== History ==
About 600 the valley was settled by Romanised Celts backing away from the migration of Alpine Slavs moving up the Drava Valley. Part of the Upper Carinthian Lurngau, the estates from about 1135 were held by the local Counts of Ortenburg. After the extinction of the Ortenburg dynasty in 1418, their inheritance passed to the Counts of Celje and finally to the Habsburg dukes of Carinthia in 1456.

In 1518, at the behest of the Habsburg ruler Maximilian I, Stockenboi and its extended forests were merged with neighbouring Paternion into an autonomous lordship (Herrschaft), originally held by the House of Dietrichstein. In 1599 it was acquired by the Khevenhüller noble family which however had to emigrate in the course of the Counter-Reformation in 1629.

After the Revolutions of 1848, the communities of Stockenboi, Wiederschwing and Ziebl emerged from the former lordship. The present-day municipality was established in 1865.

== Politics ==
The municipal council (Gemeinderat) consists of 15 members. Since the 2021 Carinthian local elections, it is made up of the following parties:

- Freedom Party of Austria (FPÖ): 7 seats
- Austrian People's Party (ÖVP): 5 seats
- Social Democratic Party of Austria (SPÖ): 3 seats

The mayor of Stockenboi, Hans-Jörg Kerschbaumer (FPÖ), was re-elected in 2021.
