= Kappel am Krappfeld =

- Municipality
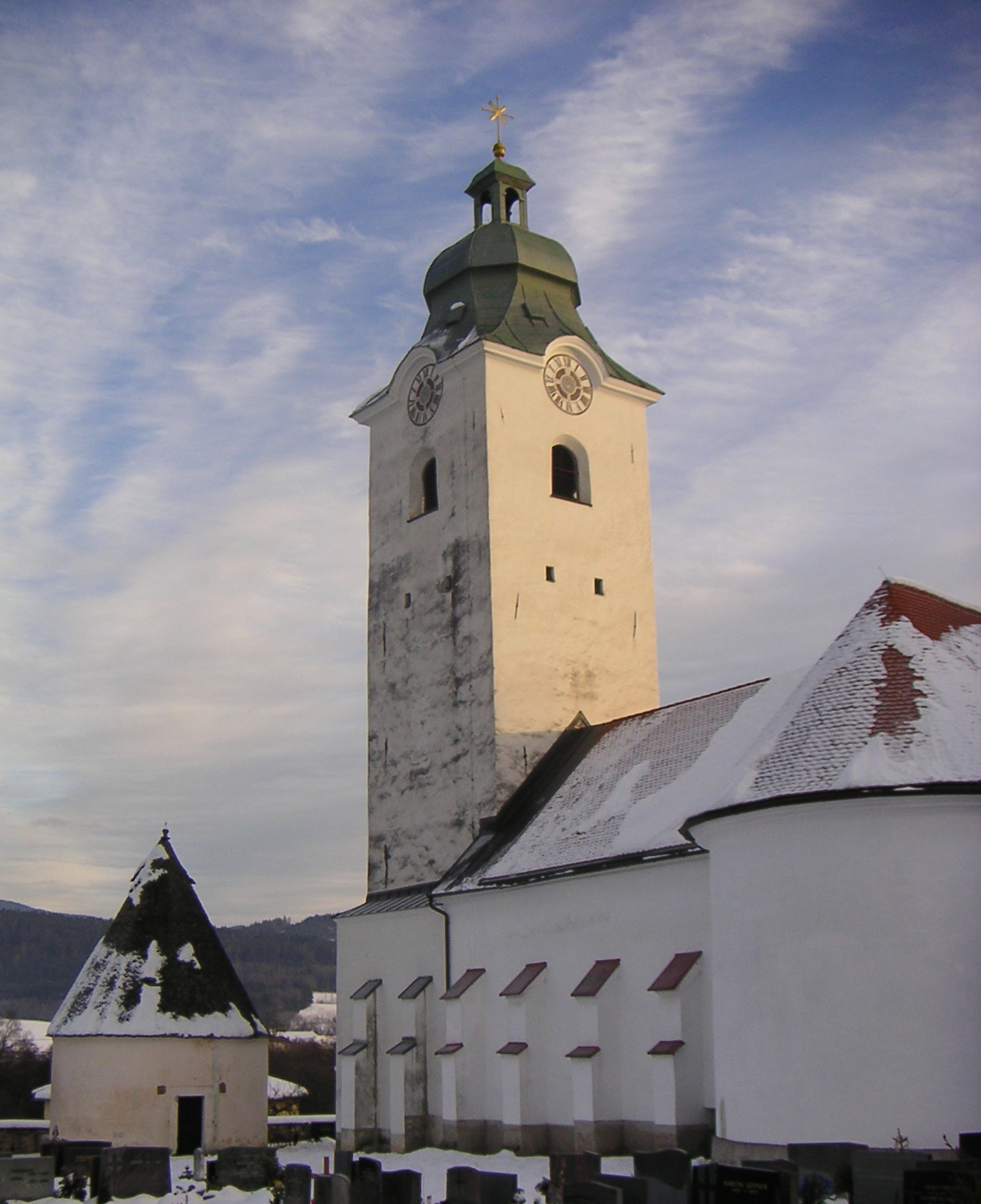
- Kappel am Krappfeld parish church

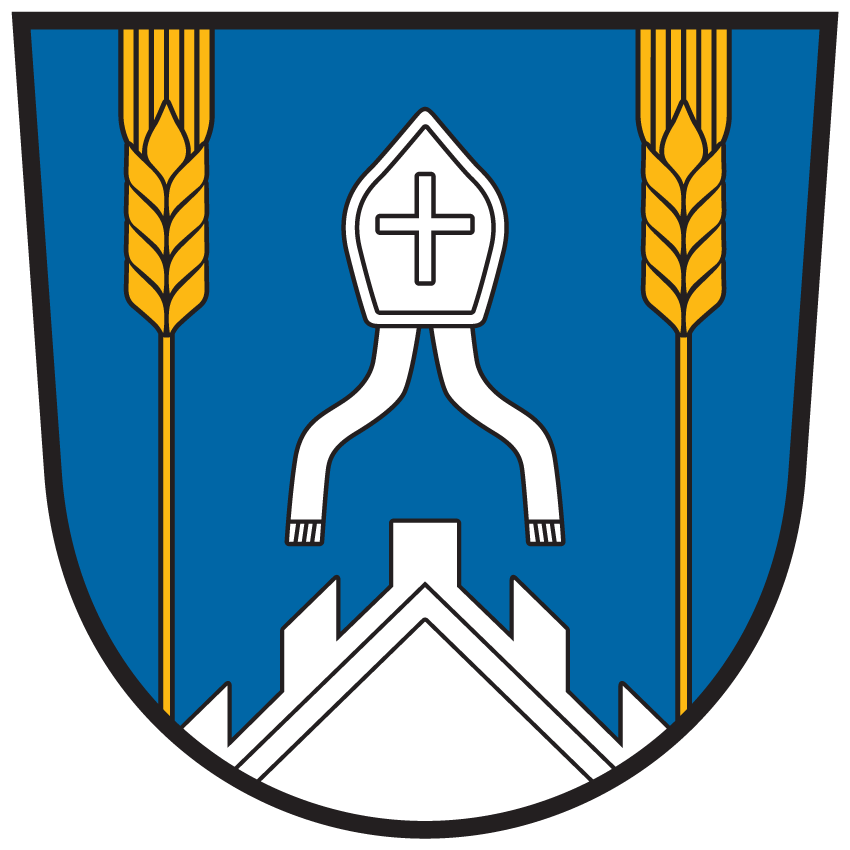
- Coat of arms

- Location within Austria
- Coordinates: 46°50′N 14°29′E
- Country: Austria
- Province: Carinthia
- District: Sankt Veit an der Glan

Government
  - Mayor: Karl Steinberger

Area
  - Total: 49.7 km^{2} (19.2 sq mi)
- Elevation: 594 m (1,949 ft)

Population (2018-01-01)
  - Total: 1,951
  - Density: 39.3/km^{2} (102/sq mi)
- Time zone: UTC+1 (CET)
  - Summer (DST): UTC+2 (CEST)
- Postal code: 9321
- Area code: 04262
- Website: www.kappel-am-krappfeld.at

Kappel am Krappfeld (Slovene: Kapela na Grobniškem polju) is a town in the district of Sankt Veit an der Glan in the Austrian state of Carinthia. It is the birthplace of Maria Lassnig.

== Geography ==
Kappel lies about 25 km northeast of Klagenfurt. Neighboring municipalities from the north clockwise are Althofen, Guttaring, Klein Sankt Paul, Eberstein, Sankt Georgen am Längsee, and Mölbling.
