= Tibet Center Institute =

Coordinates: 46.9378°N 14.5634°E

Tibet Center Institute – International Institute of Higher Tibetan Studies was founded by the 14th Dalai Lama, Lama Geshe Tenzin Dhargye and the Tibet Office Geneva with the support of the Carinthian state government and is located in Knappenberg in the region of Hüttenberg, Carinthia, Austria. The institute provides an authentic and secular education program on Tibet's authentic knowledge and culture on an academic level which makes it unique in Europe.

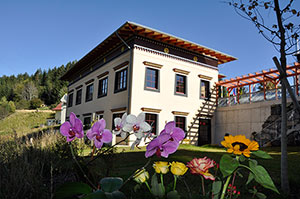
Tibet Center Institut, North View

== History ==
Tibet Center Institute was founded by the 14th Dalai Lama, Ven. Geshe Tenzin Dhargye and the Tibet Office Geneva with the support of the Carinthian State Government in 2008 and is since then under the special patronage of the Dalai Lama. In 2005, the Dalai Lama had accepted to support the project presented by the Carinthian state government and the municipality Hüttenberg, Austria. So he nominated Lama Geshe Tenzin Dhargye as director and teacher of Tibet Center Institute and gave him the full responsibility for the project that was realized and established as a non-profit association, recognized by Austrian law. In October 2008 the education institute started its activities. In May 2014 the seat of the institute was transferred to its new building in Knappenberg at 1000m altitude (see pictures).

In May 2012 the 9-day Austria visit of the 14th Dalai Lama was organized and conducted by Tibet Center Institute. Events took place in Klagenfurt, Salzburg and Vienna, being visited by ca. 30.000 participants, plus ca. 15.000 participants via live stream. In all these events more than 200 volunteers supported the event team. The profits of the public events was used to cover the cost and for charitable purposes.

== Aims ==
Tibet Center Institute offers an academic education program with the aim to make authentic Tibetan knowledge and culture accessible to the Western public. It attracts those who are interested in Tibetan culture and want to learn more. The institute is dedicated to the Dalai Lama's wish of promoting human values, meaning to strengthen the mental and physical wellbeing in the society and thus contribute to happiness and peace in the world. Tibet Center Institute brings together different cultures and functions as a platform for the dialog between religions, cultures and worldviews.

Tibet Center's education program provides access to Buddhist culture on an academic and secular (non-religious) level and offers programs on all Tibetan knowledge areas (tib. Rigne). This makes it unique in Europe. In close cooperation with the University of Tibetan Studies in Sarnath, India and the Tibetan Medical and Astro Institute (Men-Tsee-Khang) in Dharamsala, India Tibet Center Institute's participants receive after successful completion of a diploma course a certificate issued jointly with these partners.

== Education program ==
Tibet Center Institute offers Diploma Courses on Buddhist Science of Mind, Buddhist Philosophy and Religion and Traditional Tibetan Medicine and courses, workshops and seminars on Tibetan Thangka-Painting Art, Tibetan Language and Tibetan Astrology.

=== Range of topics ===
- Indo-Tibetan Cultural Sciences
  - Buddhist Science of Mind
  - Buddhist Philosophy and Religion
- Traditional Tibetan Medicine
  - Fundamentals of Traditional Tibetan Medicine
  - Jamche Kunye - Mild Therapies and Tibetan Massage
- Others
  - Tibetan Language
  - Traditional Tibetan Thangka Painting-Art
  - Traditional Tibetan Astrology

== Statistics ==
Until 2015 more than 9.500 participants attended Tibet Center's events. More than 200 have completed diploma courses, ca. 200 are currently attending diploma courses. Participants come from over 10 nations, mostly from Austria, Germany and Switzerland.
