= Frauenstein =

Frauenstein mey refer to the following places:

== In Austria ==
- Frauenstein, Austria, in Carinthia

== In Germany ==
- Frauenstein, Saxony, in the district of Mittelsachsen
- Wiesbaden-Frauenstein, part of Wiesbaden, Hesse
