= Micheldorf =

- Municipality
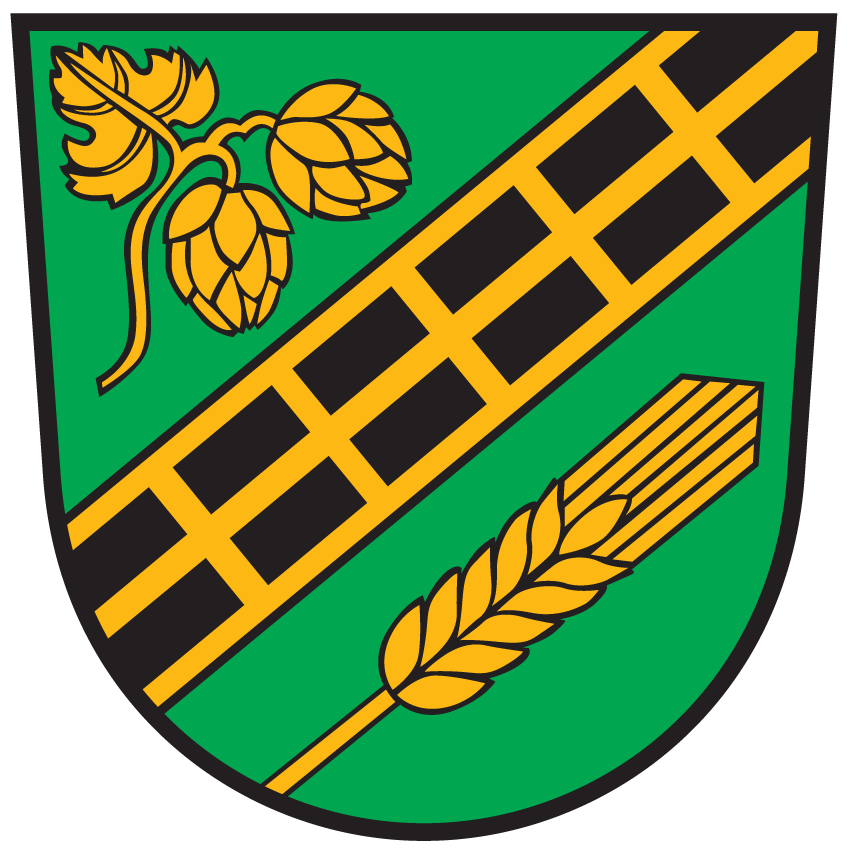
- Coat of arms

- Location within Austria
- Coordinates: 46°55′N 14°26′E
- Country: Austria
- State: Carinthia
- District: Sankt Veit an der Glan

Government
  - Mayor: Heinz Wagner

Area
  - Total: 17 km^{2} (6.6 sq mi)
- Elevation: 622 m (2,041 ft)

Population (2018-01-01)
  - Total: 1,000
  - Density: 59/km^{2} (150/sq mi)
- Time zone: UTC+1 (CET)
  - Summer (DST): UTC+2 (CEST)
- Postal code: 9322
- Area code: 04268
- Website: www.micheldorf-hirt.at

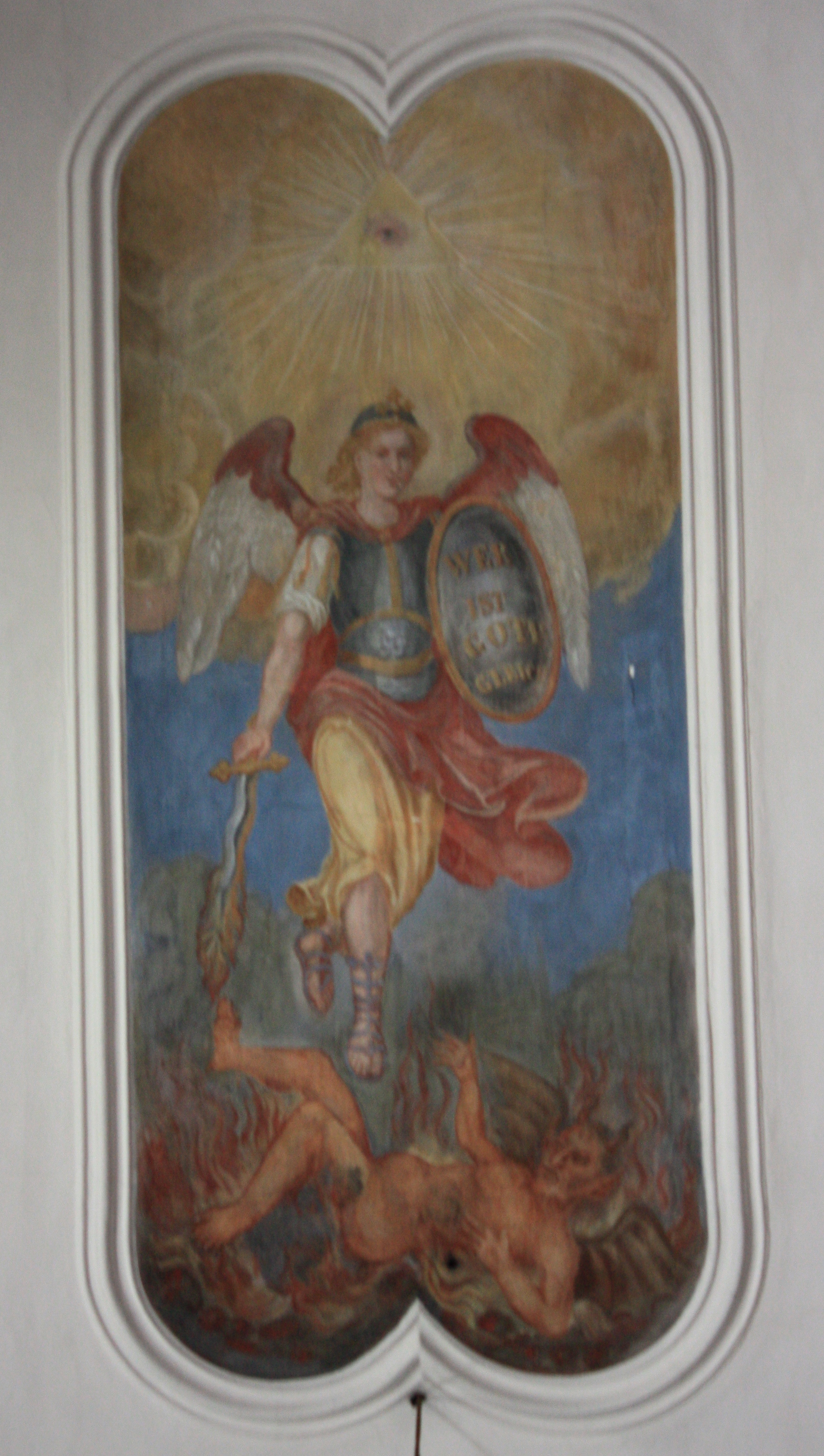
Parish church of Micheldorf, Carinthia Ceiling painting - Archangel Michael

Micheldorf (Slovene: Mihaelova vas) is a municipality in the district of Sankt Veit an der Glan in the Austrian state of Carinthia.

== History ==
First mentioned in 1074 deed, it consists of the Katastralgemeinden Micheldorf and Lorenzenberg, which from 1973 until a 1992 referendum belonged to the neighbouring town of Friesach. Micheldorf also includes the village of Hirt, home of the Hirt brewery.

== Twin towns ==
- Micheldorf in Oberösterreich, Austria since 2002
- Villesse, Italy since 2003
