= Weitensfeld im Gurktal =

- Municipality
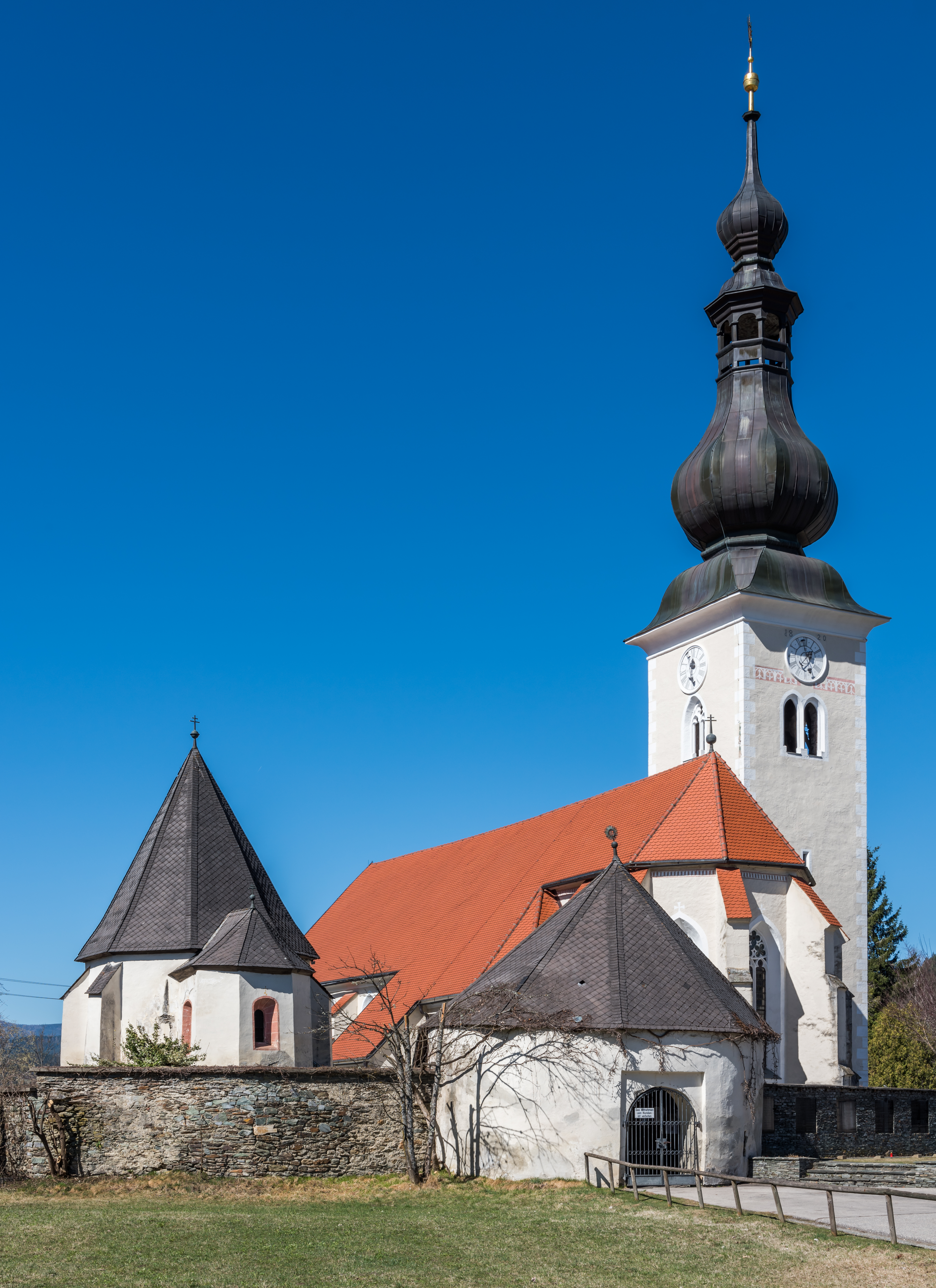
- Weitensfeld parish church

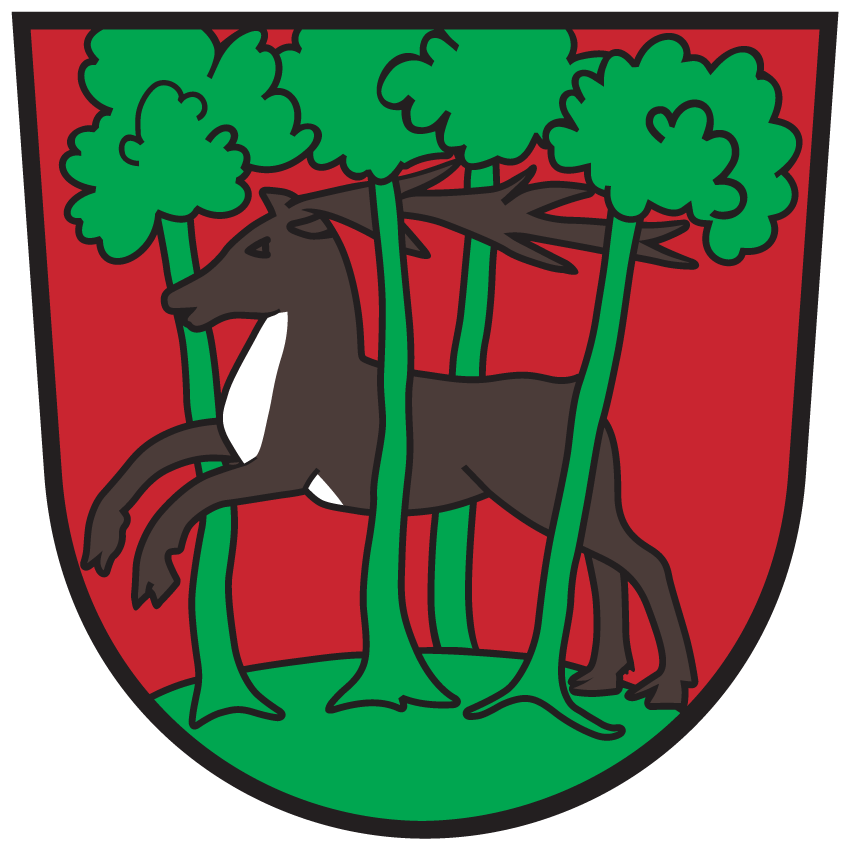
- Coat of arms

- Location within Austria
- Coordinates: 46°51′N 14°12′E
- Country: Austria
- State: Carinthia
- District: Sankt Veit an der Glan

Government
  - Mayor: Heinz Hochsteiner

Area
  - Total: 95.77 km^{2} (36.98 sq mi)
- Elevation: 702 m (2,303 ft)

Population (2018-01-01)
  - Total: 2,091
  - Density: 21.83/km^{2} (56.55/sq mi)
- Time zone: UTC+1 (CET)
  - Summer (DST): UTC+2 (CEST)
- Postal code: 9344
- Area code: 04265
- Website: www.weitensfeldimgurktal.at

Weitensfeld im Gurktal (Slovene: Prečpolje ob Krki) is a market town in the district of Sankt Veit an der Glan in the Austrian state of Carinthia.

First settlements were established when the Romans built a connecting road through the Gurk valley to Salzburg. Between 1050 and 1065 a settlement at the Zammelsberg (Zumoltiperg) arose due to immigration from Bavaria.

In 1479, emperor Friedrich III granted castle Weitensfeld to exiled members of Branković dynasty of Serbia.

After the formation of the local municipality in 1850, the cadastral municipalities of Thurnhof and Zweinitz were annexed to Weitensfeld in 1871. From 1973 onwards, Weitensfeld became part of the large municipality of Weitensfeld-Flattnitz. After a referendum, the municipalities of Deutsch-Griffen, Glödnitz and Weitensfeld became independent again in 1991. A part of Flattnitz initially remained with Weitensfeld, but was separated with effect from 1 January 1994 and annexed to the municipality of Glödnitz. Since January 1, 1995, the municipality has been called Weitensfeld im Gurktal.

== Twin towns ==
Weitensfeld im Gurktal is twinned with:

- Ragogna, Italy, since 2003

== Sources ==
- Jireček, Constantin (1918). Geschichte der Serben. Vol. 2. Gotha: Perthes.
