= Metnitz =

- Municipality
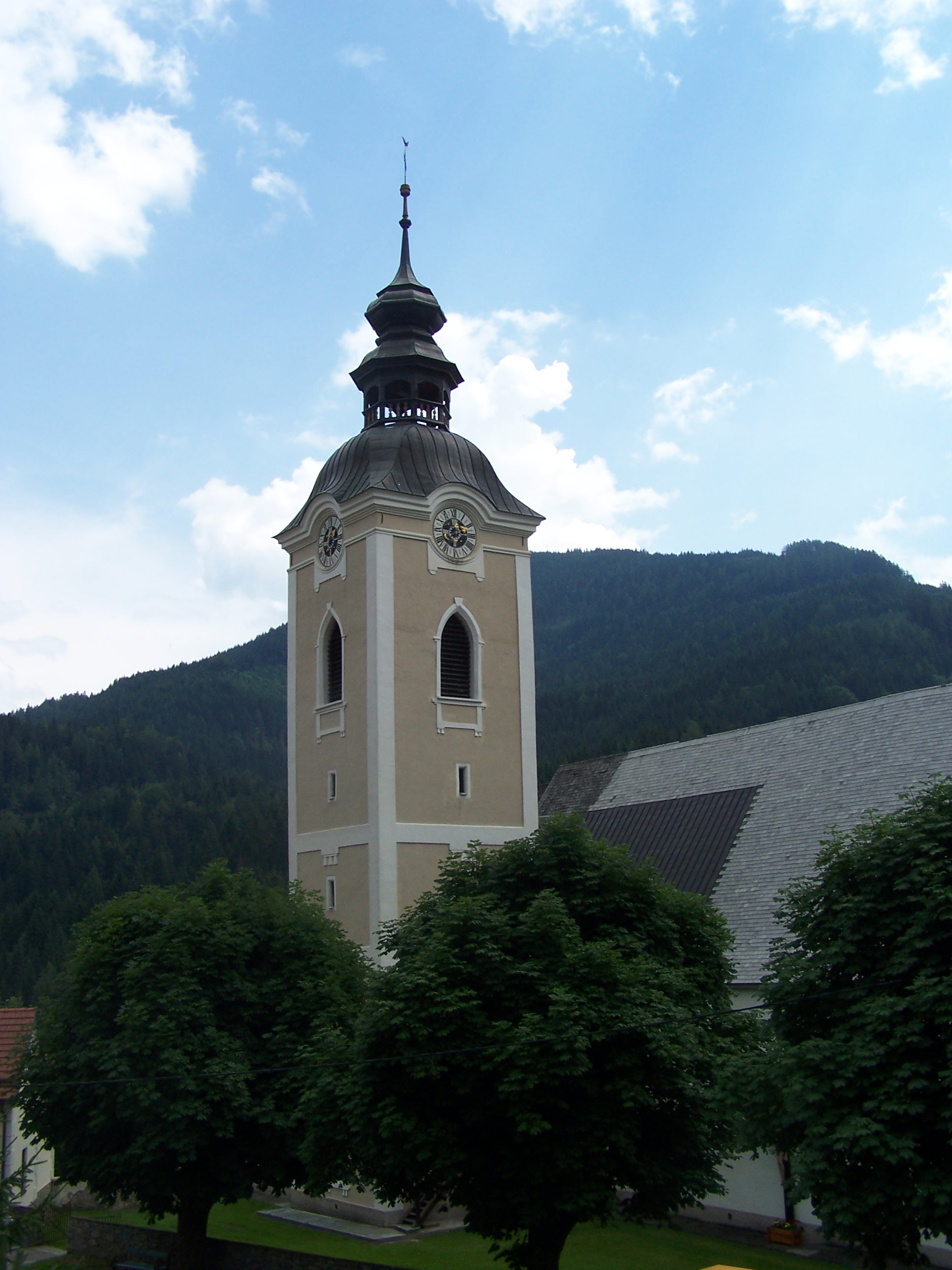
- Metnitz parish church

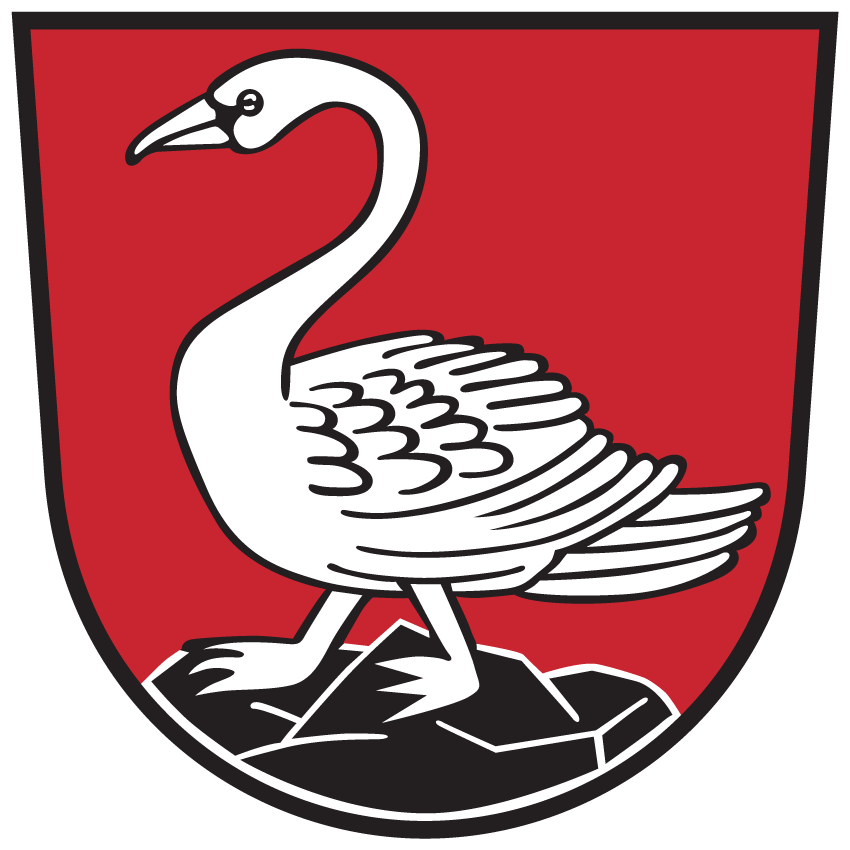
- Coat of arms

- Location within Austria
- Coordinates: 46°59′N 14°13′E
- Country: Austria
- State: Carinthia
- District: Sankt Veit an der Glan

Government
  - Mayor: Anton Engl-Wurzer

Area
  - Total: 223.14 km^{2} (86.15 sq mi)
- Elevation: 851 m (2,792 ft)

Population (2018-01-01)
  - Total: 2,011
  - Density: 9.012/km^{2} (23.34/sq mi)
- Time zone: UTC+1 (CET)
  - Summer (DST): UTC+2 (CEST)
- Postal code: 9363
- Area code: 04267
- Website: www.metnitz.at

Metnitz (Slovene: Metnica) is a town in the district of Sankt Veit an der Glan in the Austrian state of Carinthia.

== Geography ==
Metnitz lies in the north of Carinthia and includes most of the Metnitz valley and the surrounding Gurktal Alps.
