= Hüttenberg, Austria =

Hüttenberg
- Municipality
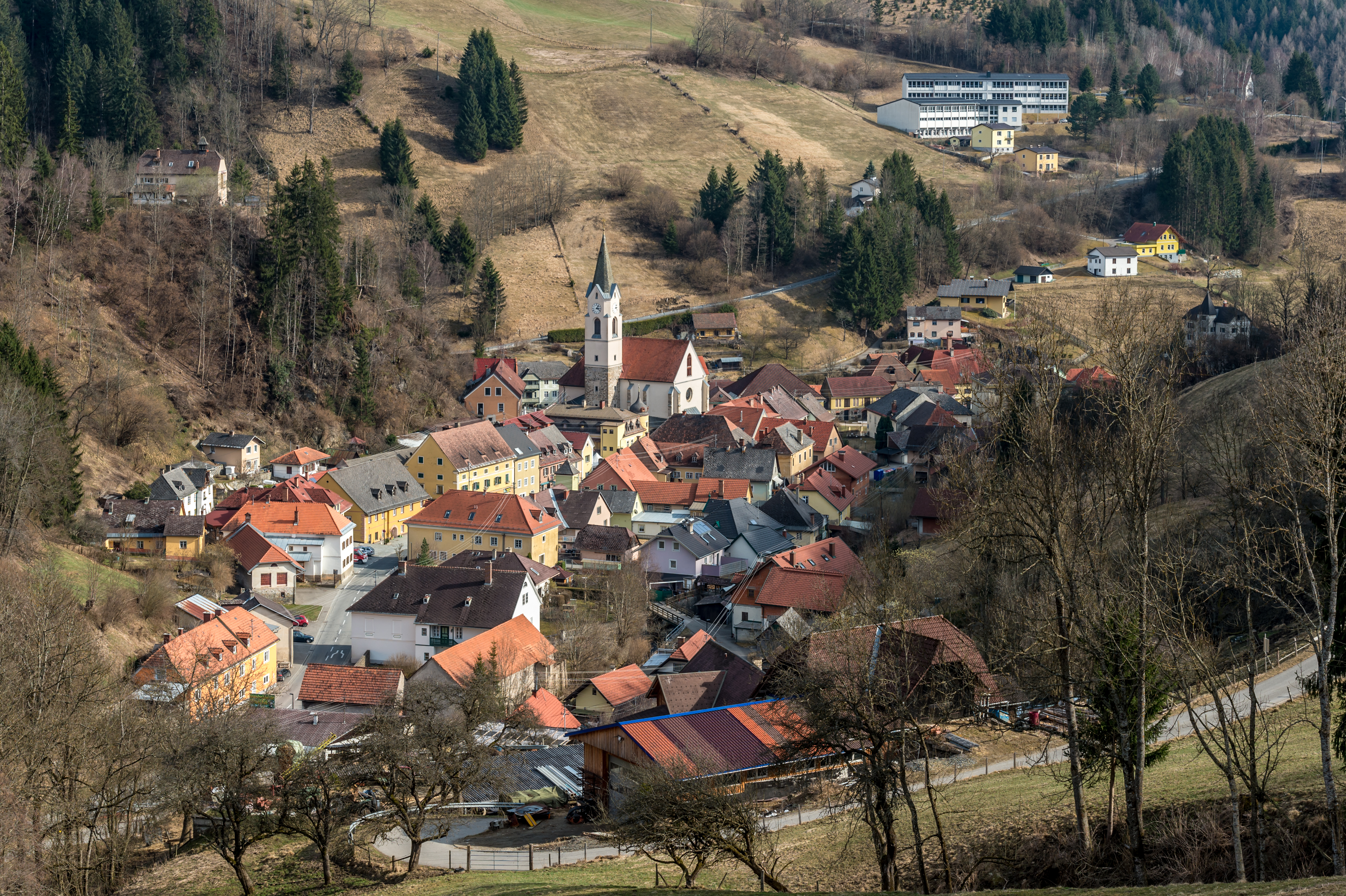
- Hüttenberg

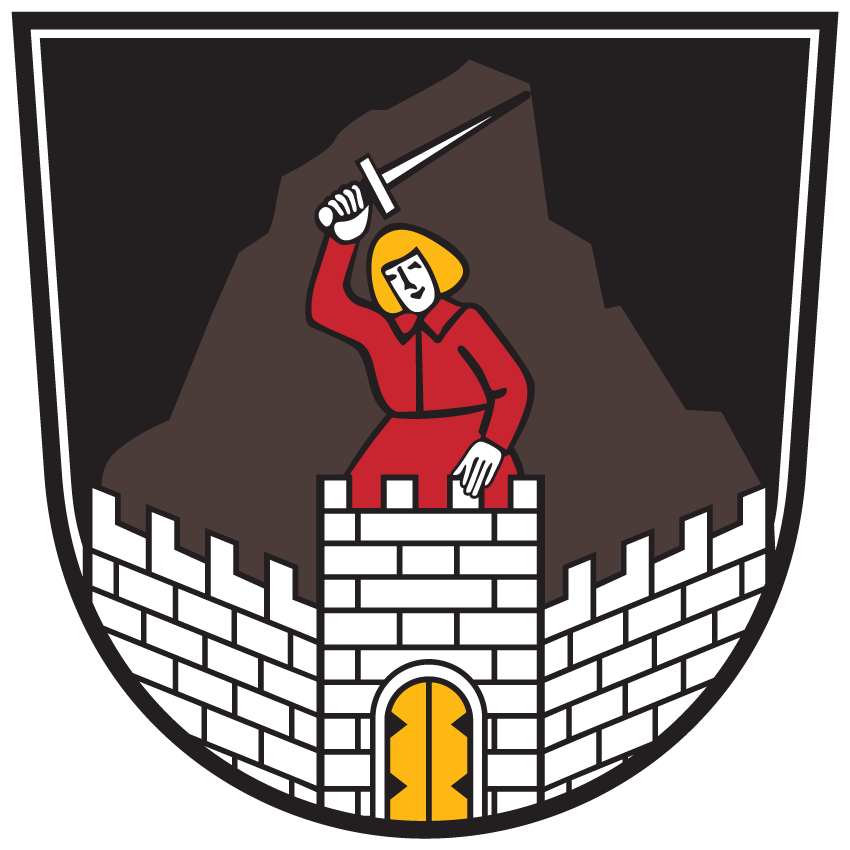
- Coat of arms

- Location within Austria Location within Carinthia
- Coordinates: 46°56′23″N 14°32′55″E
- Country: Austria
- State: Carinthia
- District: Sankt Veit an der Glan

Government
  - Mayor: Josef Ofner (FPÖ)

Area
  - Total: 134.52 km^{2} (51.94 sq mi)
- Elevation: 786 m (2,579 ft)

Population (2018-01-01)
  - Total: 1,414
  - Density: 10.51/km^{2} (27.22/sq mi)
- Time zone: UTC+1 (CET)
  - Summer (DST): UTC+2 (CEST)
- Postal code: 9375
- Area code: 04263
- Website: www.huettenberg.at

Hüttenberg (Austrian German pronunciation: [ˈhʏtn̩bɛrɡ]; Slovene: Železni Hrib) is a market town in the district of Sankt Veit an der Glan in the Austrian state of Carinthia.

== Geography ==
The municipality includes the Görtschitz valley in the southern foothills of the Seetal Alps. On the north, it borders Styria. Neighboring municipalities are Reichenfels, Bad Sankt Leonhard, and Wolfsberg on the east, Klein Sankt Paul on the south, and Guttaring and Friesach on the west.

== Personalities ==
- Heinrich Harrer was born in the town and a museum is dedicated to him today.
