= Althofen =

- Municipality
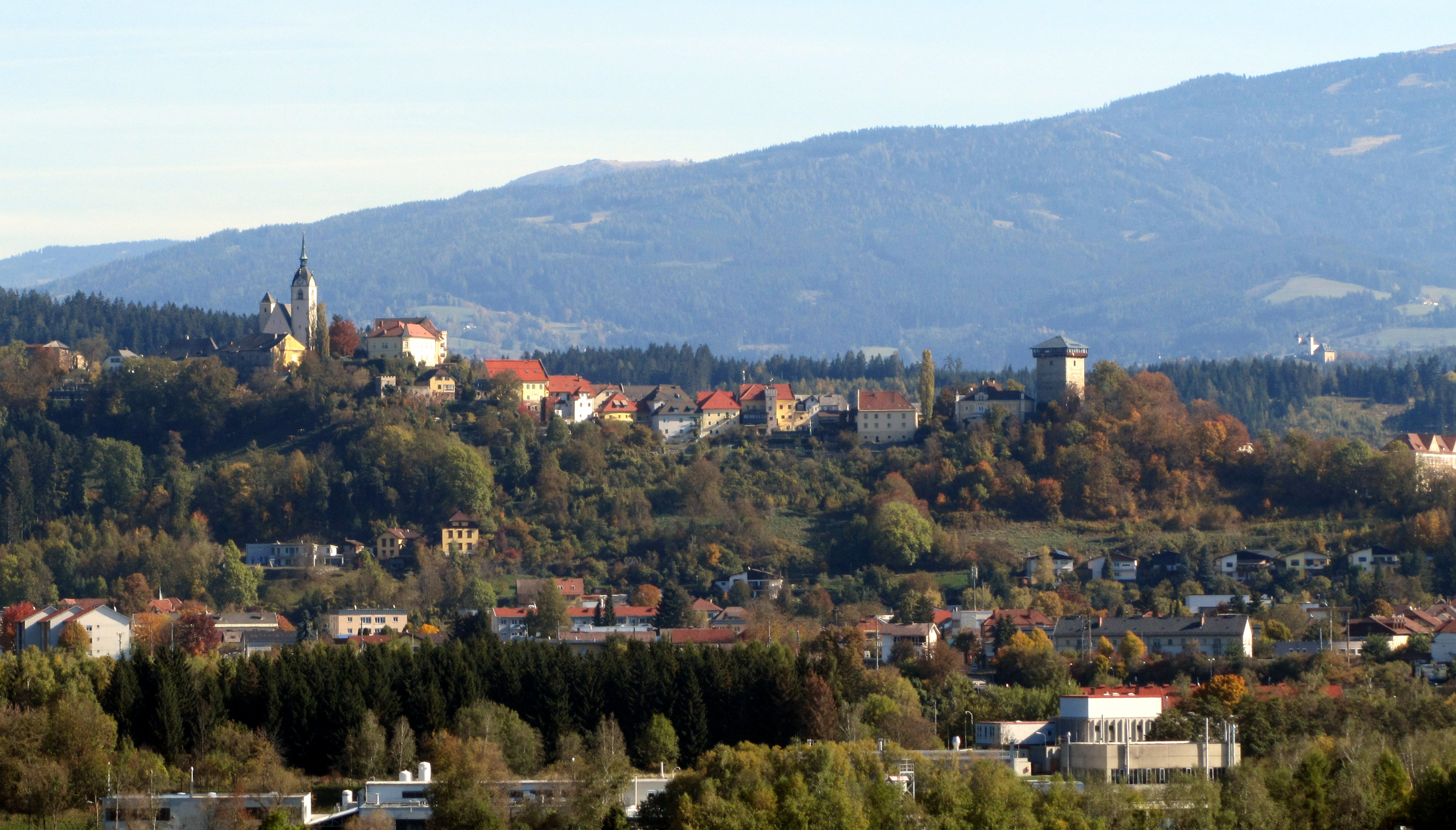
- Stadt Althofen im September 2013

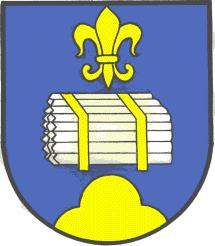
- Coat of arms

- Location within Austria
- Coordinates: 46°52′N 14°28′E
- Country: Austria
- State: Carinthia
- District: Sankt Veit an der Glan

Government
  - Mayor: Dr. Walter Zemrosser

Area
  - Total: 12.29 km^{2} (4.75 sq mi)
- Elevation: 714 m (2,343 ft)

Population (2018-01-01)
  - Total: 4,759
  - Density: 387.2/km^{2} (1,003/sq mi)
- Time zone: UTC+1 (CET)
  - Summer (DST): UTC+2 (CEST)
- Postal code: 9330
- Area code: 04262
- Website: althofen.gv.at

Althofen (Slovene: Stari Dvor) is a town in the district of Sankt Veit an der Glan in the Austrian state of Carinthia.

== Geography ==
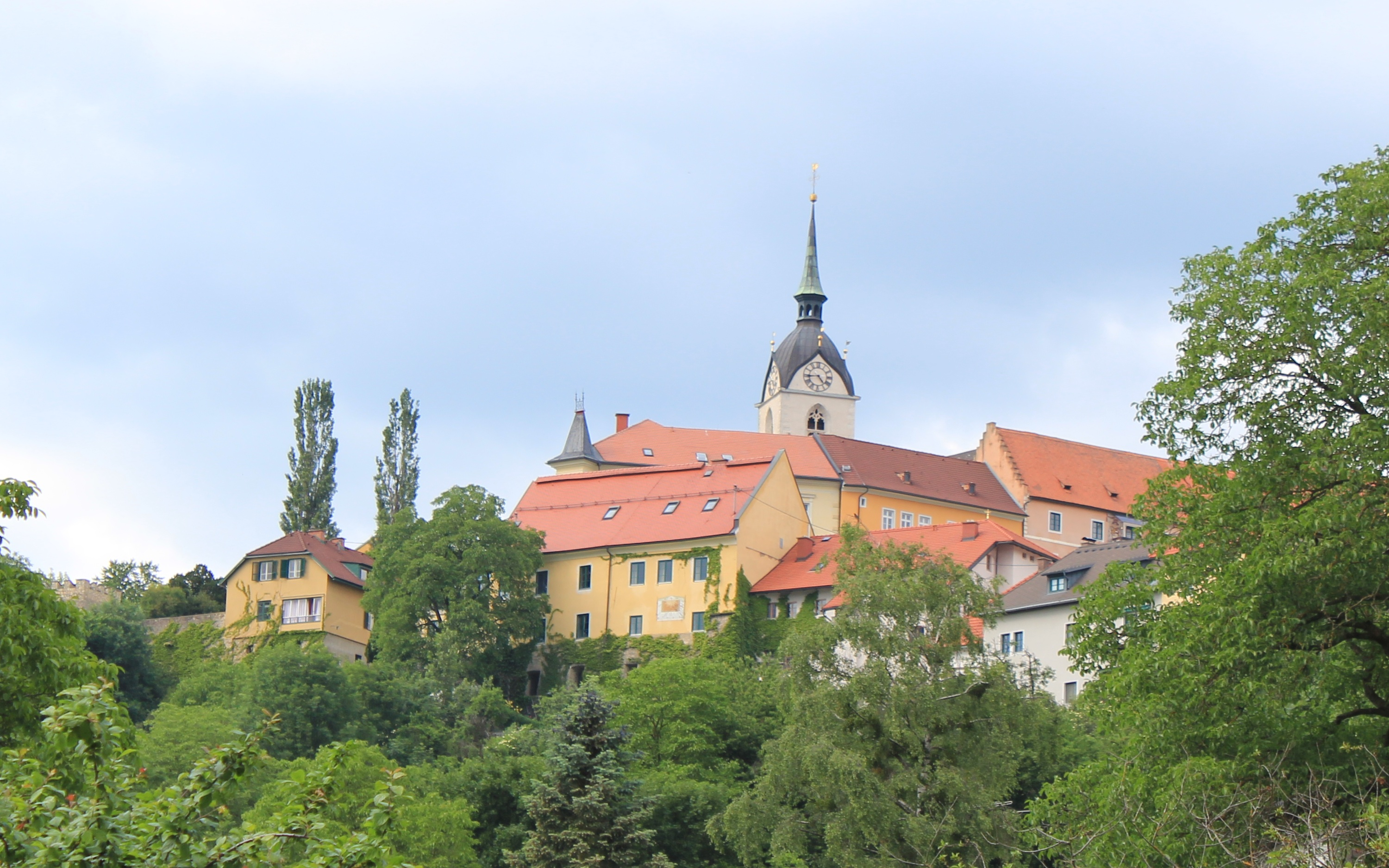
Althofen - Altstadt

The town is located about 15 km (9.3 mi) north of Sankt Veit an der Glan and 30 km (19 mi) north of the state capital Klagenfurt in the Krappfeld Valley between the Gurktal Alps mountain range in the west and the Lavanttal Alps in the east. The township consists of the cadastral communities Treibach, Althofen, and Töscheldorf.

== History ==
There are some prehistoric finds in Althofen, namely two Neolithic axes, some Late Bronze Age ceramics and a Hallstatt Age tumulus. Several small finds and some tombstones date from the Roman era.

From about 600 Althofen became a settlement area of Slavic people. Altanhouun in the Duchy of Carinthia was first mentioned in a 1041 deed. Like in neighbouring Friesach, the estates were held by the Archbishops of Salzburg. The local Salzburg bailiffs resided at Althofen Castle, which was devastated in the 15th century Austrian–Hungarian War and rebuilt from about 1500 as the Neues Schloss (New Castle) under Prince-Archbishop Leonhard von Keutschach.

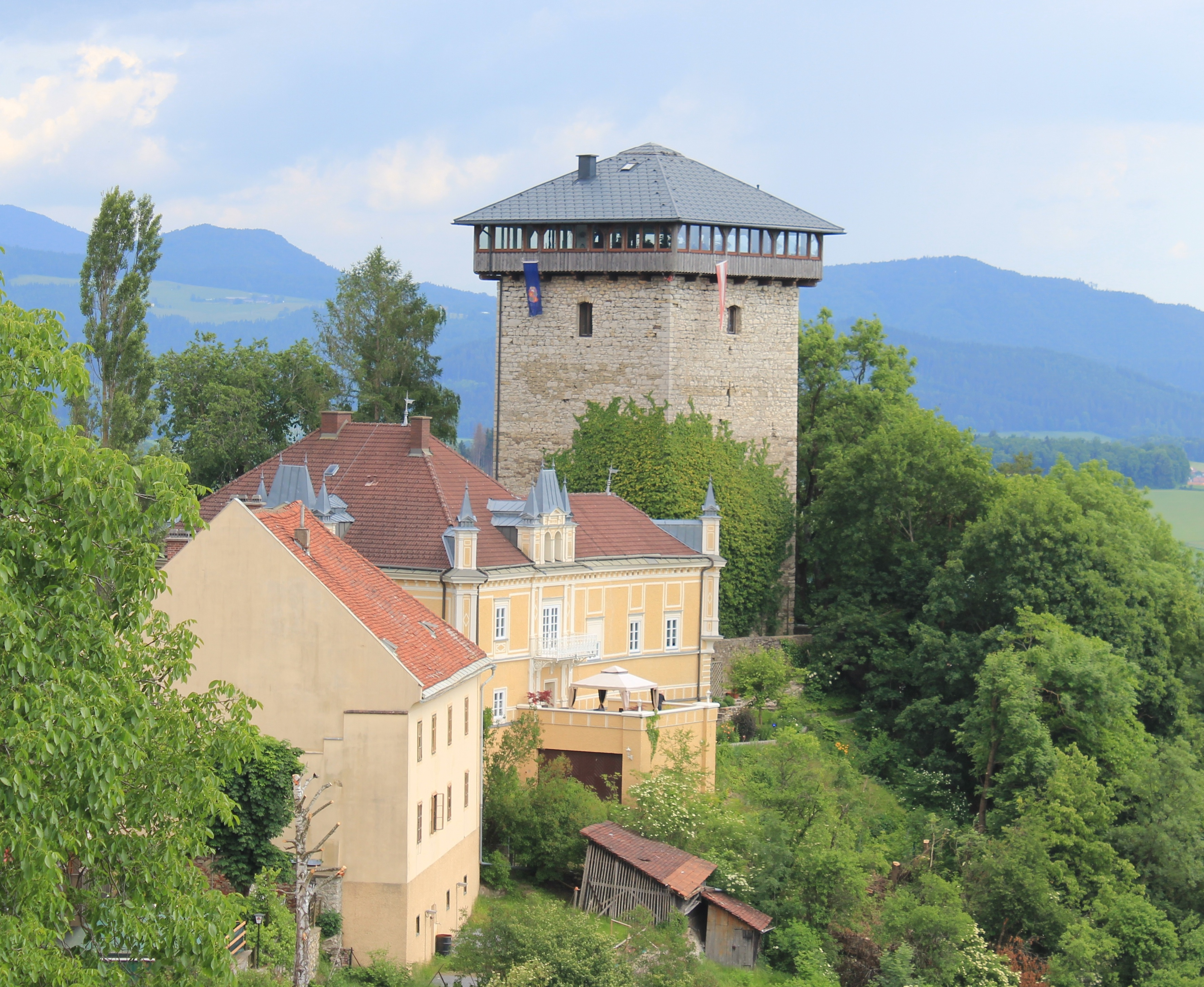
Anne Tower

A Catholic church was first mentioned in 1307, then under the auspices of the Friesach parish. The present-day parish church with its massive steeple is the only one in Carinthia dedicated to Saint Thomas of Canterbury, it was built about 1400, with Baroque ornamentation in the 18th century and Neo-Gothic embellishment in 1908–10.

In 1230 Althofen received market rights as an important trading venue, mainly for iron (Noric steel) from the nearby mines of Hüttenberg. In 1897 the local ironworks were purchased by Baron Carl Auer von Welsbach (1858–1929), the inventor of ferrocerium (Auermetall). He developed the iron mill to a chemical plant, the later Treibacher Industrie AG, the main employer in Althofen up to today. The municipality obtained town privileges in 1993.

== Population ==
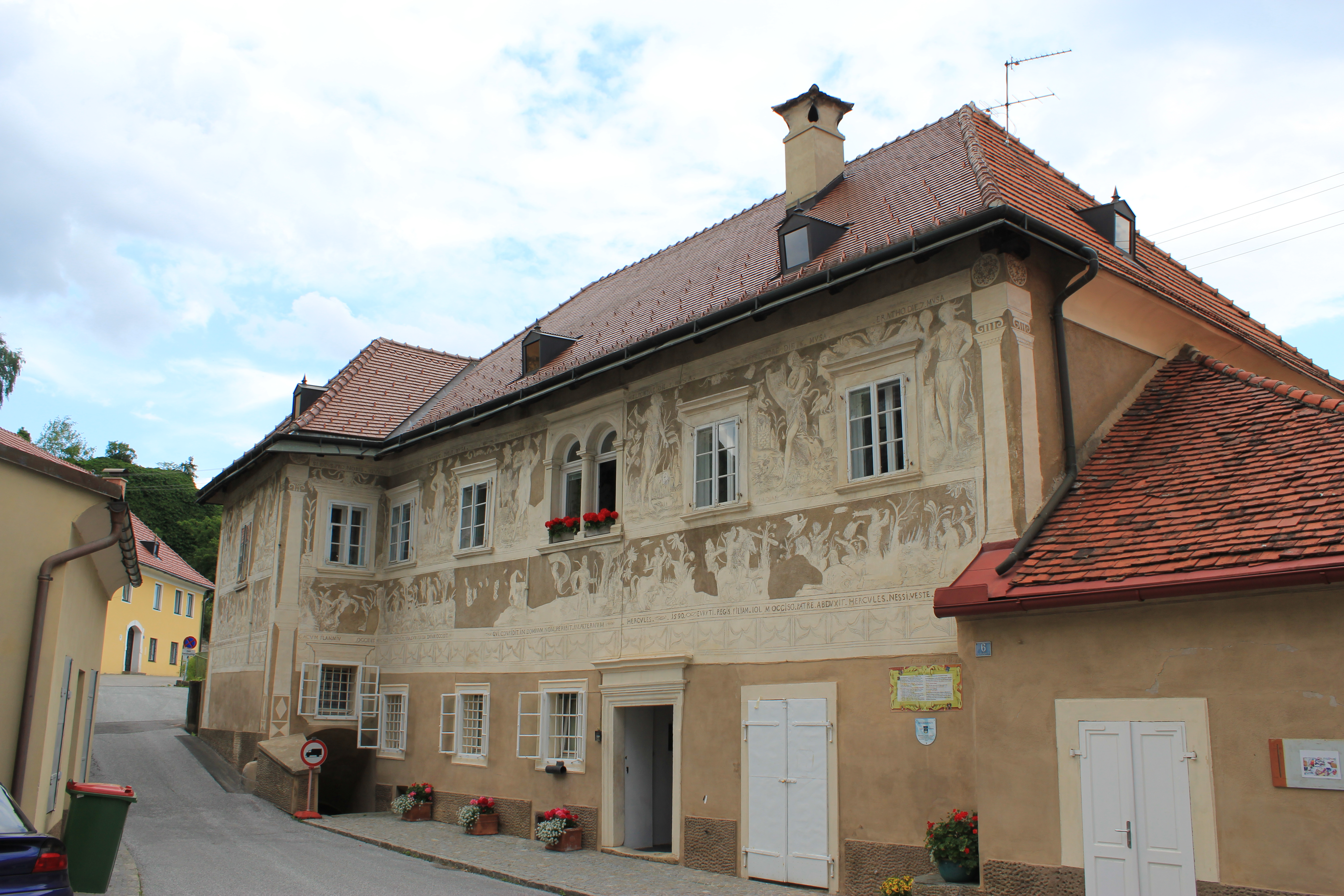
Althofen - Salzburger Platz6

Historical population
Year	Pop.	±%
1869	1,290	—
1880	1,301	+0.9%
1890	1,325	+1.8%
1900	1,675	+26.4%
1910	1,865	+11.3%
1923	2,498	+33.9%
1934	2,603	+4.2%
1939	2,550	−2.0%
1951	3,225	+26.5%
1961	3,221	−0.1%
1971	3,886	+20.6%
1981	4,267	+9.8%
1991	4,615	+8.2%
2001	4,732	+2.5%
2011	4,684	−1.0%
2026	4,976	+6.2%

== Politics ==
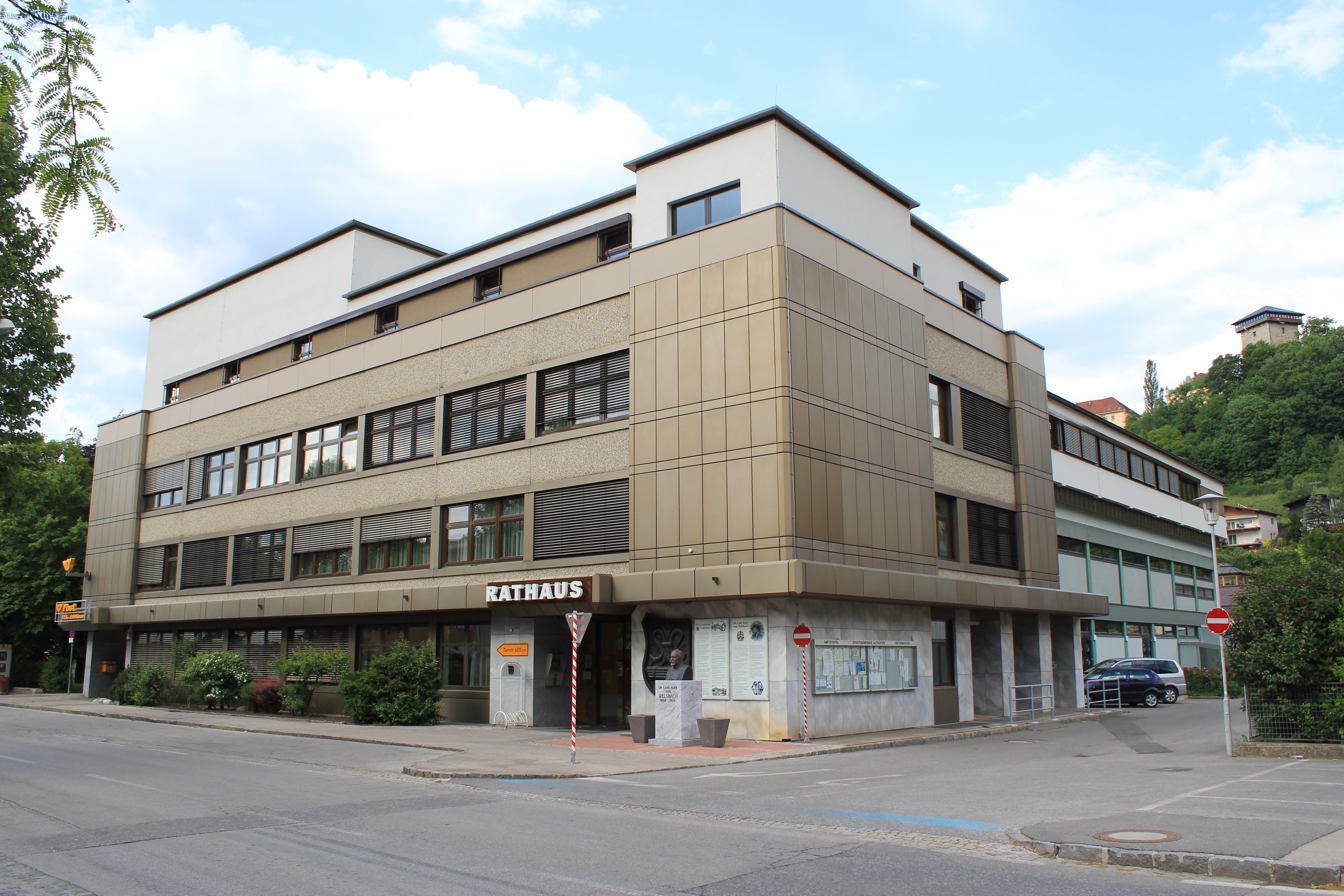
Town hall

Seats in the municipal assembly (Gemeinderat) as of 2009 local elections:

- Liste für Alle (LFA): 10
- Social Democratic Party of Austria (SPÖ): 6
- Freedom Party of Austria (FPK): 4
- Alliance for the Future of Austria (BZÖ): 1
- Independent: 2

== Twin towns ==
Althofen is twinned with:

- Tamm, Germany
- Gradisca d'Isonzo, Italy
