= St. Veit an der Glan District =

Coordinates: 46.862°N 14.428°E

St. Veit an der Glan District Bezirk St. Veit an der Glan
- District
- Country: Austria
- State: Carinthia
- Number of municipalities: 20
- Administrative seat: St. Veit an der Glan

Government
  - District Governor: Claudia Egger-Grillitsch

Area
  - Total: 1,493.67 km^{2} (576.71 sq mi)

Population (13 May 2024)
  - Total: 54,092
  - Density: 36.214/km^{2} (93.794/sq mi)
- Time zone: UTC+01:00 (CET)
  - Summer (DST): UTC+02:00 (CEST)
- Vehicle registration: SV
- NUTS code: AT213
- District code: 205

The District of St. Veit an der Glan is an administrative district in Carinthia, Austria.

== Communities ==
The district of St. Veit an der Glan is divided into 20 municipalities, of which 4 are towns and 9 are market towns; which are further sub-divided into villages and localities.

=== Towns ===
- Althofen (Slov.: Stari Dvor) (4,826)
  - Aich, Althofen, Eberdorf, Epritz, Krumfelden, Muraniberg, Rabenstein, Rain, Töscheldorf, Treibach
- Friesach (Slov.: Breže) (4,901)
  - Dobritsch, Dobritsch, Dörfl, Engelsdorf, Friesach, Gaisberg, Grafendorf, Guldendorf, Gundersdorf, Gunzenberg, Gwerz, Harold, Hartmannsdorf, Hundsdorf, Ingolsthal, Judendorf, Kräuping, Leimersberg, Mayerhofen, Moserwinkl, Oberdorf I, Oberdorf II, Olsa, Pabenberg, Reisenberg, Roßbach, Sattelbogen, Schratzbach, Schwall, Silbermann, St. Johann, St. Salvator, St. Stefan, Staudachhof, Stegsdorf, Timrian, Wagendorf, Wels, Wiegen, Wiesen, Zeltschach, Zeltschachberg, Zienitzen, Zmuck
- St. Veit an der Glan (Slov.: Šentvid ob Glini) (12,225)
  - Affelsdorf, Aich, Altglandorf, Arndorf, Baardorf, Baiersdorf, Beintratten, Blintendorf, Dellach, Draschelbach, Eberdorf, Galling, Gersdorf, Glandorf, Holz, Hörzendorf, Karlsberg, Karnberg, Laasdorf, Lebmach, Mairist, Milbersdorf, Muraunberg, Niederdorf, Pflugern, Pörtschach am Berg, Preilitz, Projern, Radweg, Raggasaal, Ritzendorf, St. Andrä, St. Donat, St. Veit an der Glan, Streimberg, Tanzenberg, Ulrichsberg, Unterbergen, Untermühlbach, Unterwuhr, Wainz
- Straßburg (Slov.: Štrasberk) (1,986)
  - Bachl, Buldorf, Dielach, Dobersberg, Dörfl, Drahtzug, Edling, Gassarest, Glabötsch, Gruschitz, Gundersdorf, Hackl, Hausdorf, Herd, Hohenfeld, Höllein, Kraßnitz, Kreuth, Kreuzen, Kulmitzen, Langwiesen, Lees, Lieding, Machuli, Mannsdorf, Mellach, Mitterdorf, Moschitz, Olschnitz, Olschnitz-Lind, Olschnögg, Pabenberg, Pöckstein-Zwischenwässern, Pölling, Ratschach, Schattseite, Schmaritzen, Schneßnitz, St. Georgen, St. Jakob, St. Johann, St. Magdalen, St. Peter, Straßburg-Stadt, Unteraich, Unterfarcha, Unterrain, Wildbach, Wilpling, Winklern

=== Market Towns ===
- Brückl (Slov.: Mostič) (2,735)
  - Brückl, Christofberg, Eppersdorf, Hart, Hausdorf, Johannserberg, Krainberg, Krobathen, Labegg, Michaelerberg, Oberkrähwald, Ochsendorf, Pirkach, Salchendorf, Schmieddorf, Selesen, St. Filippen, St. Filippen, St. Gregorn, St. Ulrich am Johannserberg, Tschutta
- Eberstein (Slov.: Svinec) (1,218)
  - Baumgarten, Eberstein, Gutschen, Hochfeistritz, Kaltenberg, Kulm, Mirnig, Rüggen, St. Oswald, St. Walburgen
- Gurk (Slov.: Krka) (1,187)
  - Dörfl, Finsterdorf, Föbing, Gassarest, Glanz, Gruska, Gurk, Gwadnitz, Hundsdorf, Kreuzberg, Krön, Masternitzen, Niederdorf, Pisweg, Ranitz, Reichenhaus, Straßa, Sutsch, Zabersdorf, Zedl, Zedroß, Zeltschach
- Guttaring (Slov.: Kotarče) (1,504)
  - Baierberg, Dachberg, Deinsberg, Dobritsch, Gobertal, Guttaring, Guttaringberg, Höffern, Höffern, Hollersberg, Maria Hilf, Oberstranach, Rabachboden, Ratteingraben, Schalkendorf, Schelmberg, Schrottenbach, Sonnberg, St. Gertruden, Übersberg, Urtl, Urtlgraben, Verlosnitz, Waitschach, Weindorf
- Hüttenberg (Slov.: Železni Hrib) (1,804)
  - Andreaskreuz, Gobertal, Gossen, Heft, Hinterberg, Hüttenberg, Hüttenberg Land, Jouschitzen, Knappenberg, Lichtegg, Lölling Graben, Lölling Schattseite, Lölling Sonnseite, Obersemlach, Semlach, St. Johann am Pressen, St. Martin am Silberberg, Stranach, Unterwald, Waitschach, Zosen
- Klein St. Paul (Slov.: Mali Št. Pavel) (1,766)
  - Buch, Drattrum, Dullberg, Filfing, Grünburg, Katschniggraben, Kirchberg, Kitschdorf, Klein St. Paul, Maria Hilf, Mösel, Müllergraben, Oberwietingberg, Prailing, Prailing, Raffelsdorf, Sittenberg, Unterwietingberg, Wietersdorf, Wietersdorf, Wieting
- Liebenfels (Slov.: Lepo Polje) (3,405)
  - Bärndorf, Beißendorf, Eggen I, Eggen II, Freundsam, Gasmai, Glantschach, Gößeberg, Graben, Gradenegg, Grassendorf, Grund, Hardegg, Hart, Hoch-Liebenfels, Hohenstein, Kraindorf, Kulm, Ladein, Lebmach, Liebenfels, Liemberg, Lorberhof, Mailsberg, Metschach, Miedling, Moos, Pflausach, Pflugern, Pulst, Puppitsch, Radelsdorf, Rasting, Reidenau, Rohnsdorf, Rosenbichl, Sörg, Sörgerberg, St. Leonhard, Tschadam, Waggendorf, Wasai, Weitensfeld, Woitsch, Zmuln, Zojach, Zwattendorf, Zweikirchen
- Metnitz (Slov.: Metnica) (1,868)
  - Auen, Feistritz, Felfernigthal, Grades, Klachl, Laßnitz, Maria Höfl, Marienheim, Metnitz, Mödring, Oberalpe, Oberhof Schattseite, Oberhof Sonnseite, Preining, Schnatten, Schwarzenbach, Teichl, Unteralpe, Vellach, Wöbring, Zanitzberg, Zwatzhof
- Weitensfeld im Gurktal (Slov.: Prečpolje ob Krki) (2,015)
  - Ading, Aich, Altenmarkt, Bach (Zweinitz), Braunsberg, Brunn (Zweinitz), Dalling, Dielach, Dolz, Edling, Engelsdorf, Grabenig, Grua, Hafendorf, Hardernitzen, Hundsdorf, Kaindorf, Kleinglödnitz, Kötschendorf, Kraßnitz, Lind, Massanig, Mödring, Mödritsch, Nassing, Niederwurz, Oberort, Planitz, Psein, Reinsberg, Sadin, St. Andrä, Steindorf, Traming, Tschriet, Weitensfeld, Wullroß, Wurz, Zammelsberg, Zauchwinkel, Zweinitz

=== Municipalities ===
- Deutsch-Griffen (Slov.: Slovenj Grebinj) (851)
  - Albern, Arlsdorf, Bach, Bischofsberg, Brunn, Deutsch Griffen, Faulwinkel, Gantschach, Göschelsberg, Graben, Gray, Hintereggen, Hochrindl, Leßnitz, Meisenberg, Messaneggen, Mitteregg, Oberlamm, Pesseneggen, Ratzendorf, Rauscheggen, Sand, Spitzwiesen, Tanzenberg, Unterlamm
- Frauenstein (Slov.: Ženji Kamen) (3,555)
  - Äußere Wimitz, Beißendorf, Breitenstein, Dörfl, Dornhof, Dreifaltigkeit, Eggen, Fachau, Föbing, Frauenstein, Gassing, Graßdorf, Grassen, Gray, Grua, Hammergraben, Hintnausdorf, Höffern, Hörzenbrunn, Hunnenbrunn, Innere Wimitz, Kraig, Kraindorf, Kreuth, Laggen, Leiten, Lorenziberg, Mailsberg, Mellach, Nußberg, Obermühlbach, Pfannhof, Pörlinghof, Predl, Puppitsch, Sand, Schaumboden, Seebichl, Siebenaich, Stammerdorf, Steinbichl, Steinbrücken, Stromberg, Tratschweg, Treffelsdorf, Überfeld, Weidenau, Wimitz, Wimitzstein, Zedl bei Kraig, Zensweg, Zwein
- Glödnitz (Slov.: Glodnica) (828)
  - Altenmarkt, Bach, Brenitz, Eden, Flattnitz, Glödnitz, Grai, Hohenwurz, Jauernig, Kleinglödnitz, Laas, Lassenberg, Moos, Rain, Schattseite, Torf, Tschröschen, Weißberg, Zauchwinkel
- Kappel am Krappfeld (Slov.: Kapela na Krapskem polju) (1,964)
  - Boden, Dobranberg, Dürnfeld, Edling, Freiendorf, Garzern, Gasselhof, Geiselsdorf, Gölsach, Grillberg, Gutschen, Haide, Haidkirchen, Kappel am Krappfeld, Krasta, Krasta, Landbrücken, Latschach, Lind, Mannsberg, Mauer, Möriach, Muschk, Oberbruckendorf, Passering, Pölling, Poppenhof, Rattenberg, Schöttlhof, Silberegg, St. Florian, St. Klementen, St. Martin am Krappfeld, St. Willibald, Unterbergen, Unterpassering, Unterstein, Windisch, Zeindorf
- Micheldorf (Slov.: Mihaelova vas) (980)
  - Gasteige, Gaudritz, Gulitzen, Hirt, Lorenzenberg, Micheldorf, Ostrog, Ruhsdorf, Schödendorf, Schödendorf
- Mölbling (Slov.: Molnek) (1,333)
  - Bergwerksgraben, Breitenstein, Brugga, Dielach, Drasenberg, Eixendorf, Gaming, Gerach, Gratschitz, Gunzenberg, Kogl, Mail, Meiselding, Mölbling, Pirka, Rabing, Rastenfeld, Ringberg, St. Kosmas, St. Stefan am Krappfeld, Stein, Stein, Stoberdorf, Straganz, Treffling, Tschatschg, Unterbergen, Unterdeka, Wattein, Welsbach
- St. Georgen am Längsee (Slov.: Šentjurij ob Dolgem jezeru) (3,624)
  - Bernaich, Dellach, Drasendorf, Fiming, Garzern, Goggerwenig, Goggerwenig, Gösseling, Hochosterwitz, Kreutern, Krottendorf, Labon, Launsdorf, Maigern, Mail-Süd, Niederosterwitz, Pirkfeld, Podeblach, Pölling, Rain, Reipersdorf, Rottenstein, Scheifling, Siebenaich, St. Georgen am Längsee, St. Martin, St. Peter, St. Sebastian, Stammerdorf, Taggenbrunn, Thalsdorf, Töplach, Tschirnig, Unterbruckendorf, Unterlatschach, Weindorf, Wiendorf, Wolschart

(all populations are from the 2023 census)
