= Brückl =

Brückl Mostič
- Municipality
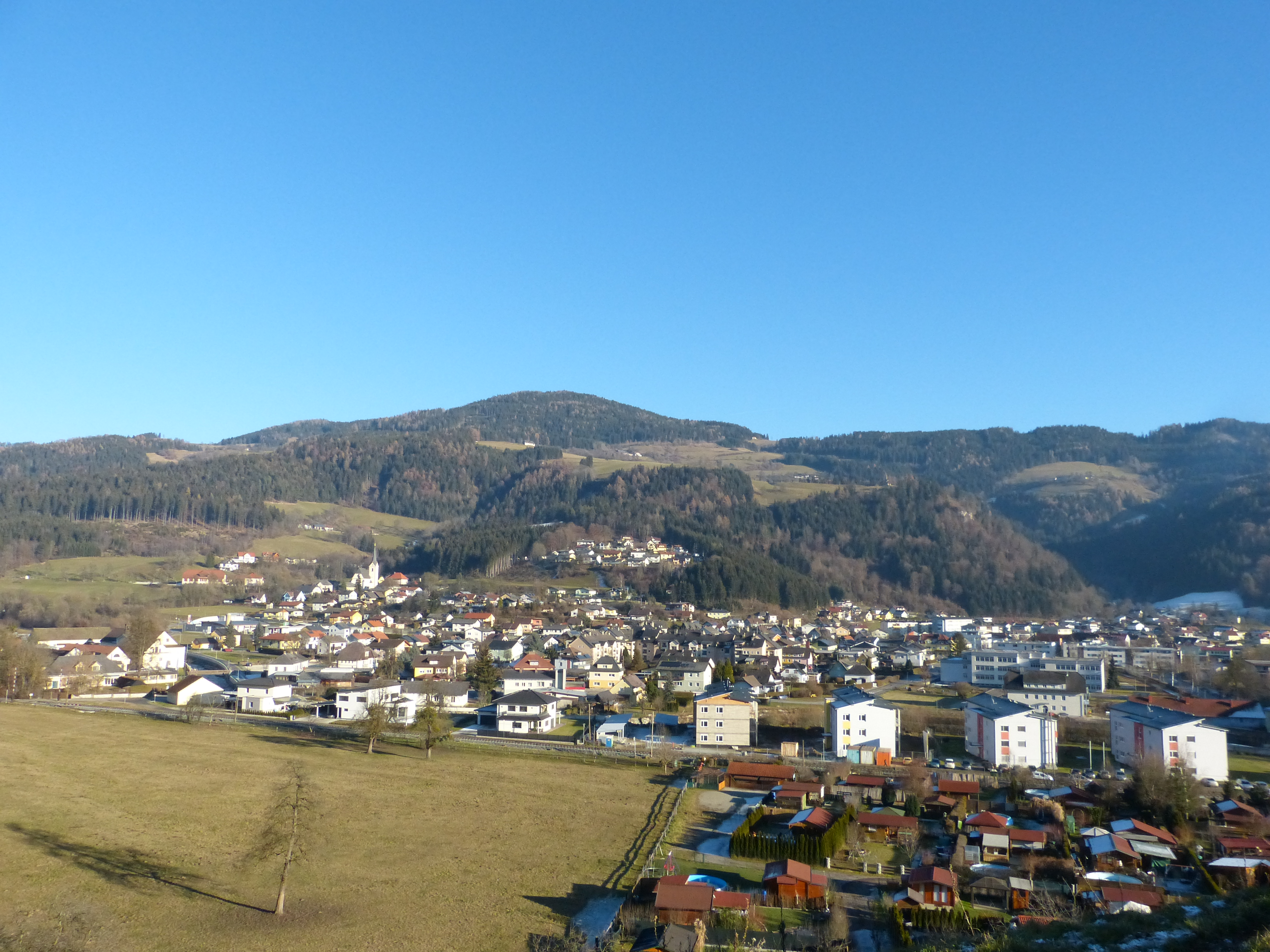

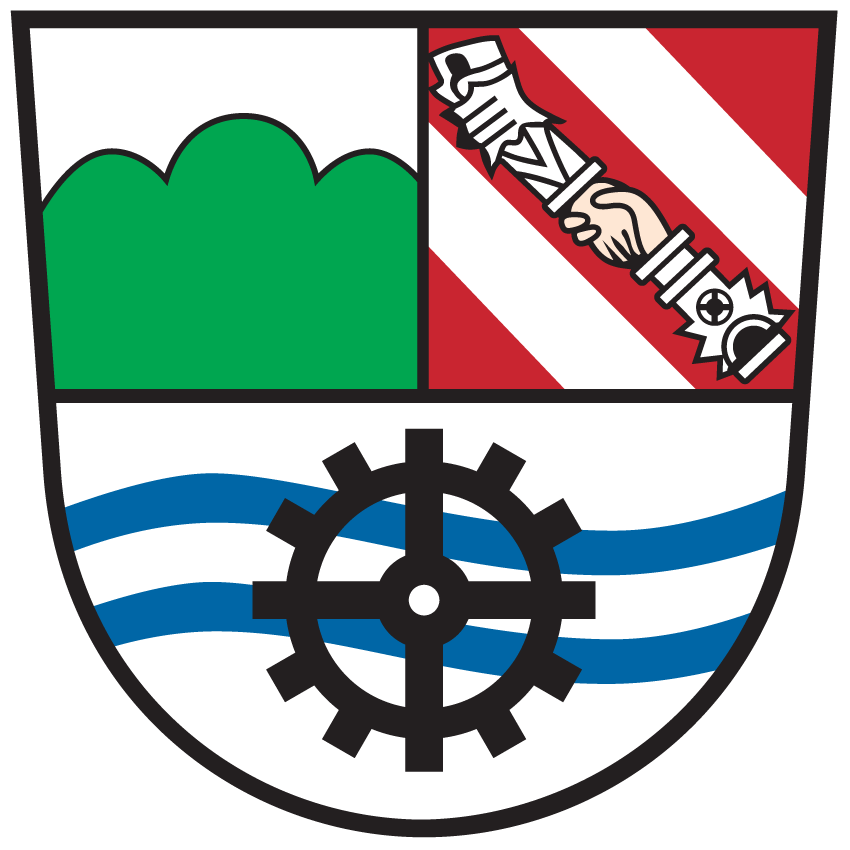
- Coat of arms

- Location within Austria
- Coordinates: 46°45′N 14°32′E
- Country: Austria
- State: Carinthia
- District: Sankt Veit an der Glan

Government
  - Mayor: Wolfgang Schaller

Area
  - Total: 46.63 km^{2} (18.00 sq mi)
- Elevation: 510 m (1,670 ft)

Population (2018-01-01)
  - Total: 2,717
  - Density: 58.27/km^{2} (150.9/sq mi)
- Time zone: UTC+1 (CET)
  - Summer (DST): UTC+2 (CEST)
- Postal code: 9371
- Area code: 04214
- Website: ris.gemserver.at

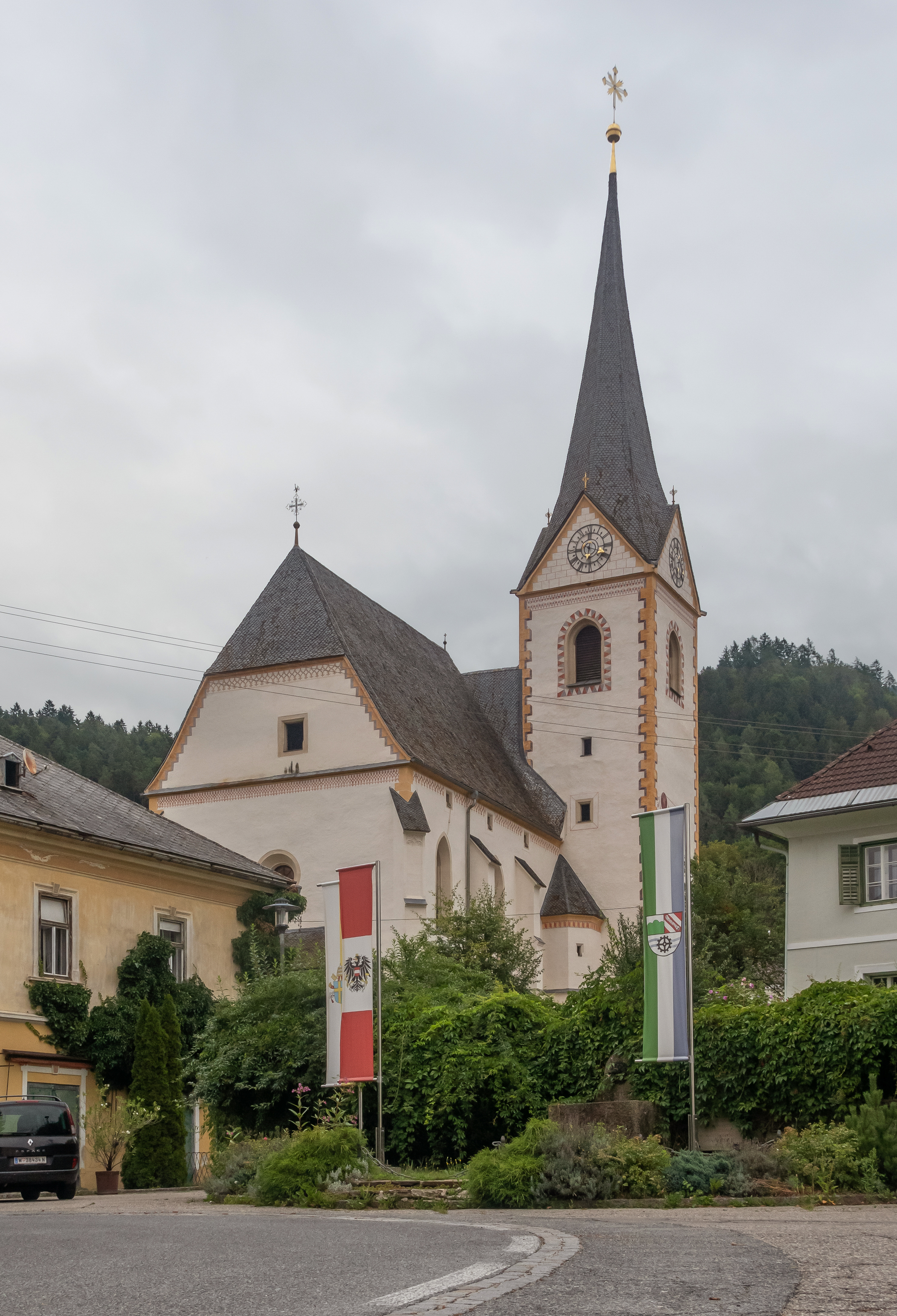
Brückl, catholic church: Pfarrkirche Sankt Johannes der Täufer

Brückl (Slovene: Mostič) is a town in the district of Sankt Veit an der Glan in the Austrian state of Carinthia.

== Geography ==
Brückl lies at the confluence of the Görtschitz and the Gurk between Magdalensberg and Saualpe.
