= Mölbling =

- Municipality
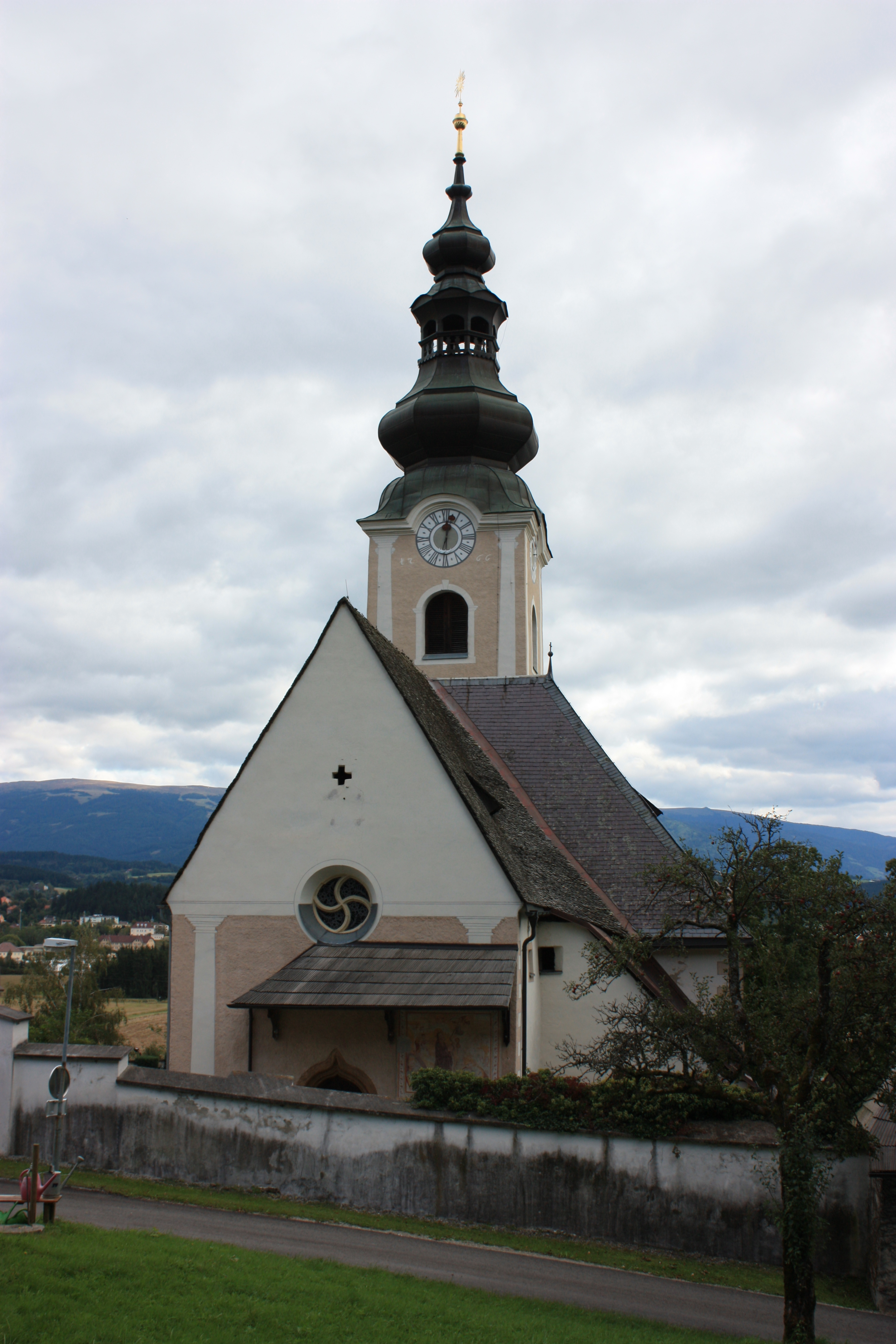

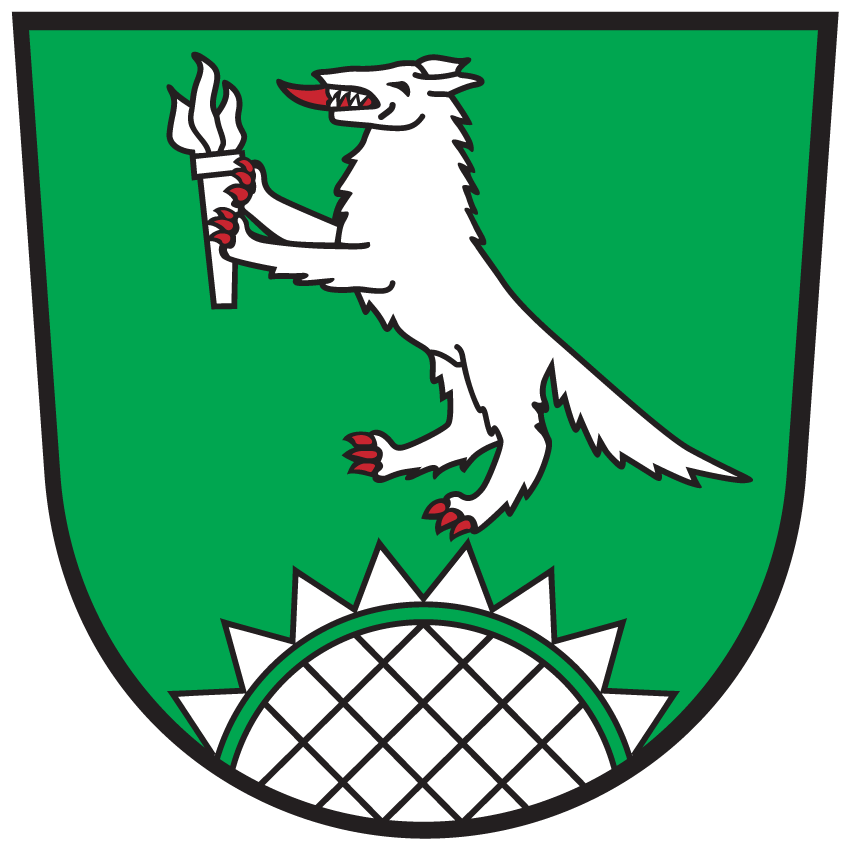
- Coat of arms

- Location within Austria
- Coordinates: 46°52′N 14°27′E
- Country: Austria
- State: Carinthia
- District: Sankt Veit an der Glan

Government
  - Mayor: Franz Rainer (FPK)

Area
  - Total: 48.95 km^{2} (18.90 sq mi)
- Elevation: 585 m (1,919 ft)

Population (2018-01-01)
  - Total: 1,315
  - Density: 26.86/km^{2} (69.58/sq mi)
- Time zone: UTC+1 (CET)
  - Summer (DST): UTC+2 (CEST)
- Postal code: 9330. 9312, 9300, 9341
- Area code: 04262
- Website: www.moelbling.at

Mölbling (Slovene: Molnek) is a municipality on the Gurk River in the district of Sankt Veit an der Glan in the Austrian state of Carinthia.

== Geography ==
Mölbling lies about 27 km northeast of Klagenfurt. The Gurk runs through the eastern edge of the municipality.

The commune comprises the Katastralgemeinden of Dielach, Gunzenberg, Meiselding, Rabing, and Rastenfeld.

== Politics ==
Seats in the municipal assembly (Gemeinderat) as of 2009 elections:

- Alliance for the Future of Austria (FPK): 11
- Social Democratic Party of Austria (SPÖ): 3
- Austrian People's Party (ÖVP): 1

== Personalities ==
In 1893 the Austrian chemist Carl Auer von Welsbach acquired Rastenfeld Castle as his private residence, where he died in 1929.
