= Klein St. Paul =

- Municipality
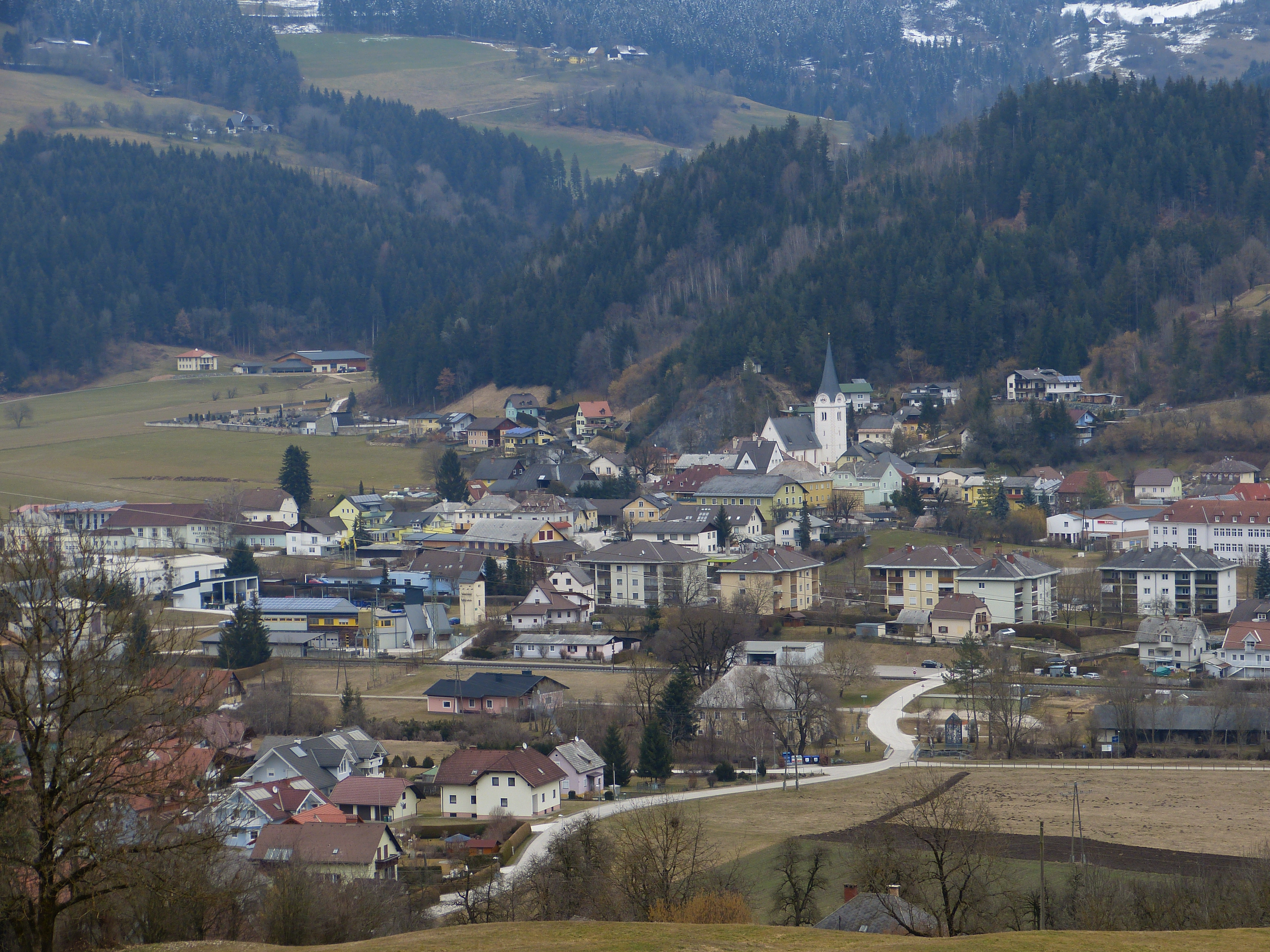

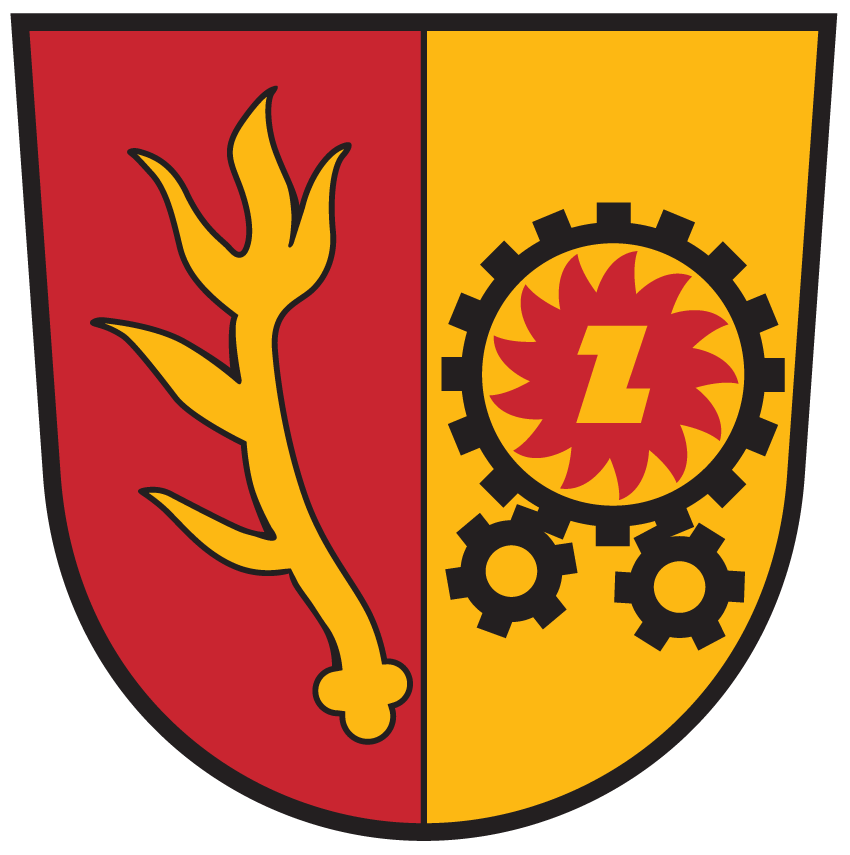
- Coat of arms

- Location within Austria
- Coordinates: 46°50′N 14°33′E
- Country: Austria
- State: Carinthia
- District: Sankt Veit an der Glan

Government
  - Mayor: Gabriele Dörflinger

Area
  - Total: 68.58 km^{2} (26.48 sq mi)
- Elevation: 633 m (2,077 ft)

Population (2018-01-01)
  - Total: 1,820
  - Density: 26.5/km^{2} (68.7/sq mi)
- Time zone: UTC+1 (CET)
  - Summer (DST): UTC+2 (CEST)
- Postal code: 9373
- Area code: 04264
- Website: www.klein-st-paul.at

Klein St. Paul (Slovene: Mali Šentpavel) is a municipality, centred on the village of the same name, in the district of St. Veit an der Glan in the Austrian state of Carinthia.

== Geography ==
Klein St. Paul lies in the central Görtschitz valley about 36 km northeast of Klagenfurt am Wörthersee.

The municipality is divided into 12 cadastral communities: Buch, Dullberg, Filfing, Grünburg, Kirchberg, Klein St. Paul, Ober St. Paul, Prailing, Sittenberg, Unter St. Paul, Wietersdorf and Wieting.

== Population ==
The municipality comprises 18 localities (Ortschaften) (number of inhabitants as at 1 January 2025 in brackets): Buch (9), Drattrum (13), Dullberg (9), Filfing (64), Grünburg (7), Kirchberg (37), Kitschdorf (104), Klein St. Paul with Hornburg (1008), Maria Hilf (0), Mösel (50), Müllergraben (1), Oberwietingberg (68), Prailing (63), Raffelsdorf (16), Sittenberg with Pemberg and Schretzich (46), Unterwietingberg (46), Wietersdorf (28) and Wieting with Hechtlsiedlung (216).

The first officially recorded population, in 1869, was 2,217. The figure rose until 1961, when it reached 3,198. Since then it has regularly declined until in 2021 it totalled 1,739. The decline is the result of a combination of emigration and a falling birthrate.

== History ==
The municipalities of Klein St. Paul and Wieting were established in 1850. In the first proposals of the state authorities in 1849 no municipality of Klein St. Paul was envisaged: Klein St. Paul, Ober St. Paul and Unter St. Paul were to go to the municipality of Eberstein, while Wietersdorf and Filfing were to go to the municipality of Wieting, and Prailing and Grünburg to the yet-to-be-created municipality of St. Oswald.

In 1870 the municipal councils of Klein St. Paul and of Wieting agreed to merge the two municipalities, and the state authorities of Carinthia approved the proposal. However, in 1871, a few days before the merger was due to take place, the Wieting council changed their minds and the state allowed the two municipalities to remain separate.

In 1930 the municipality of Klein St. Paul received the right to call itself a "market municipality" (Marktgemeinde).

The municipality structure reform (Gemeindestrukturreform) of 1973 added the former municipality of Wieting to Klein St. Paul as well as a small part of the former municipality of Lölling.

== Arms ==
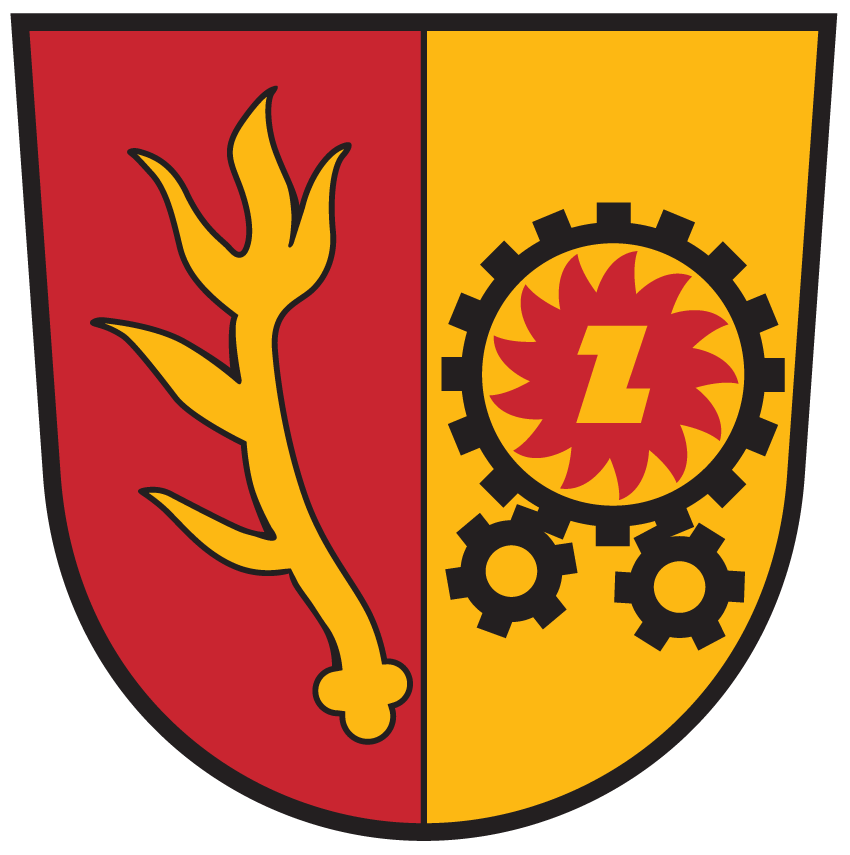

The left (dexter) half of the shield, based on the arms of the lords of Hornburg, vassals of the rulers of Carinthia, who lived in the Hornburg castle, shows one branch of a set of antlers. The other half shows a highly stylised symbol of the local cement production, to represent the industrial present: the inside of a black rotary kiln, driven by two small cogs, is filled by a red swirl of flame; the initial Z points to the cement industry (German: Zement).

The blazon: Per pale, in the dexter, Gules, the dexter antler of a ten-tined attire or; in the sinister, Or, a rotary kiln supported on two cogs sable, in the interior gold a whirl of flame rotating clockwise gules charged with a capital letter Z also gold. (Note: "Ein gespaltener Schild. Vorn in Rot eine goldene rechte Stange eines Zehnenders, hinten in Gold ein schwarzer Drehofen; darin in Gold ein im Uhrzeigersinne laufender roter Feuerflammenwirbel, der mit einem goldenen „Z“ belegt ist.")

The flag is red and yellow incorporating the arms. Arms and flag were granted to the municipality on 5 August 1969 (new grant 1974).
