= Frauenstein, Austria =

Frauenstein
- Municipality
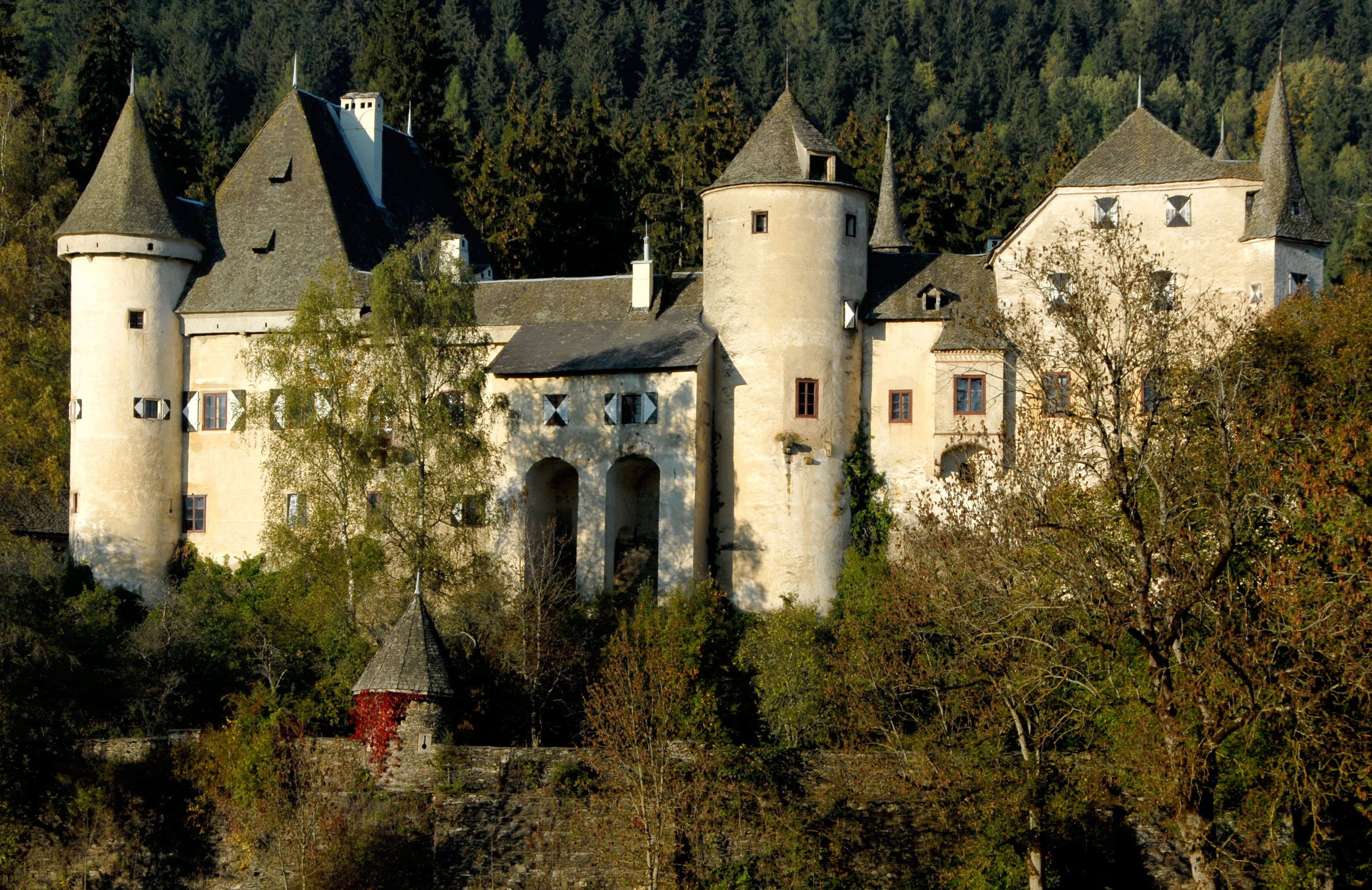
- Frauenstein Castle

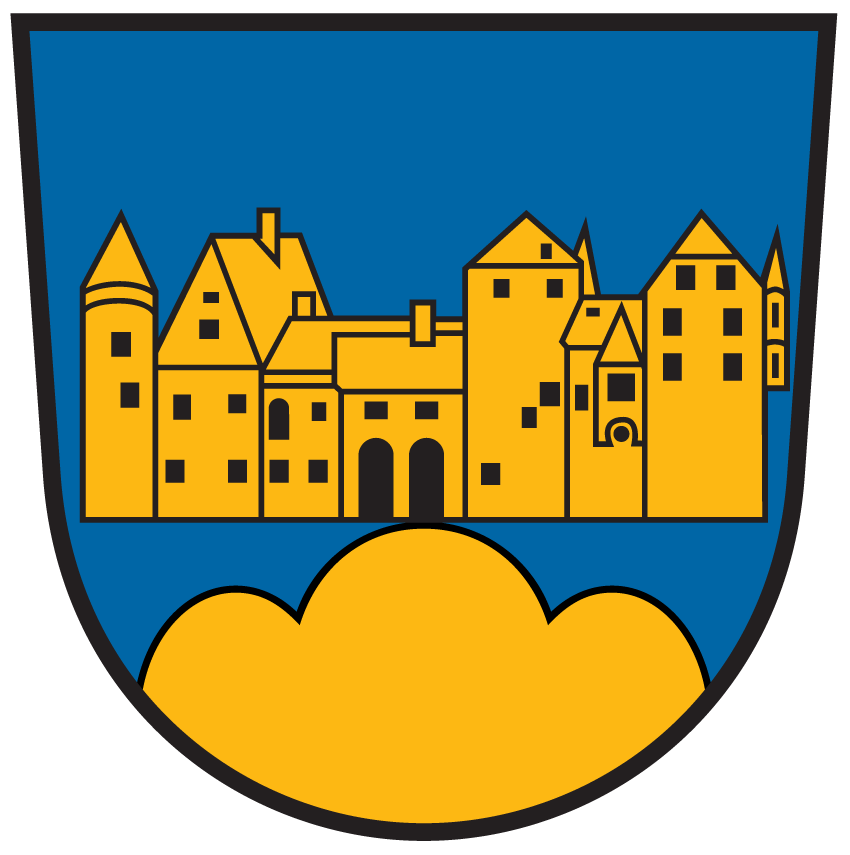
- Coat of arms

- Location within Austria
- Coordinates: 46°49′N 14°22′E
- Country: Austria
- State: Carinthia
- District: Sankt Veit an der Glan

Government
  - Mayor: Harald Jannach

Area
  - Total: 93.25 km^{2} (36.00 sq mi)
- Elevation: 630 m (2,070 ft)

Population (2018-01-01)
  - Total: 3,597
  - Density: 38.57/km^{2} (99.91/sq mi)
- Time zone: UTC+1 (CET)
  - Summer (DST): UTC+2 (CEST)
- Postal code: 9311
- Area code: 04212
- Website: www.frauenstein.at

Frauenstein (Austrian German pronunciation: [ˈfraʊənˌʃtaɪn]; Slovene: Ženji Kamen) is a town in the district of Sankt Veit an der Glan in the Austrian state of Carinthia.

== Geography ==
It is located directly northwest of Sankt Veit an der Glan in the hilly center of Carinthia. South of the community of Kraig is the Kraig Lake.

=== Populated places ===
The municipality of Frauenstein consists of the following cadastral communities (or katastralgemeinden): Dörfl, Graßdorf, Kraig, Leiten, Obermühlbach, Pfannhof, Schaumboden and Steinbichl; while further subdivided into 52 populated places (with population in brackets as of 1 January 2022).

- Äußere Wimitz (12)
- Beißendorf (21)
- Breitenstein (22)
- Dörfl (4)
- Dornhof (118)
- Dreifaltigkeit (11)
- Eggen (35)
- Fachau (52)
- Föbing (12)
- Frauenstein (6)
- Gassing (76)
- Graßdorf (192)
- Grassen (12)

- Gray (17)
- Grua (4)
- Hammergraben (15)
- Hintnausdorf (68)
- Höffern (16)
- Hörzenbrunn (2)
- Hunnenbrunn (365)
- Innere Wimitz (37)
- Kraig (610)
- Kraindorf (13)
- Kreuth (16)
- Laggen (9)
- Leiten (30)

- Lorenziberg (2)
- Mailsberg (1)
- Mellach (33)
- Nußberg (29)
- Obermühlbach (131)
- Pfannhof (19)
- Pörlinghof (136)
- Predl (33)
- Puppitsch (44)
- Sand (131)
- Schaumboden (106)
- Seebichl (19)
- Siebenaich (2)

- Stammerdorf (21)
- Steinbichl (82)
- Steinbrücken (5)
- Stromberg (65)
- Tratschweg (48)
- Treffelsdorf (127)
- Überfeld (462)
- Weidenau (3)
- Wimitz (36)
- Wimitzstein (5)
- Zedl bei Kraig (7)
- Zensweg (203)
- Zwein (25)
