= Eberstein, Austria =

Eberstein
- Municipality
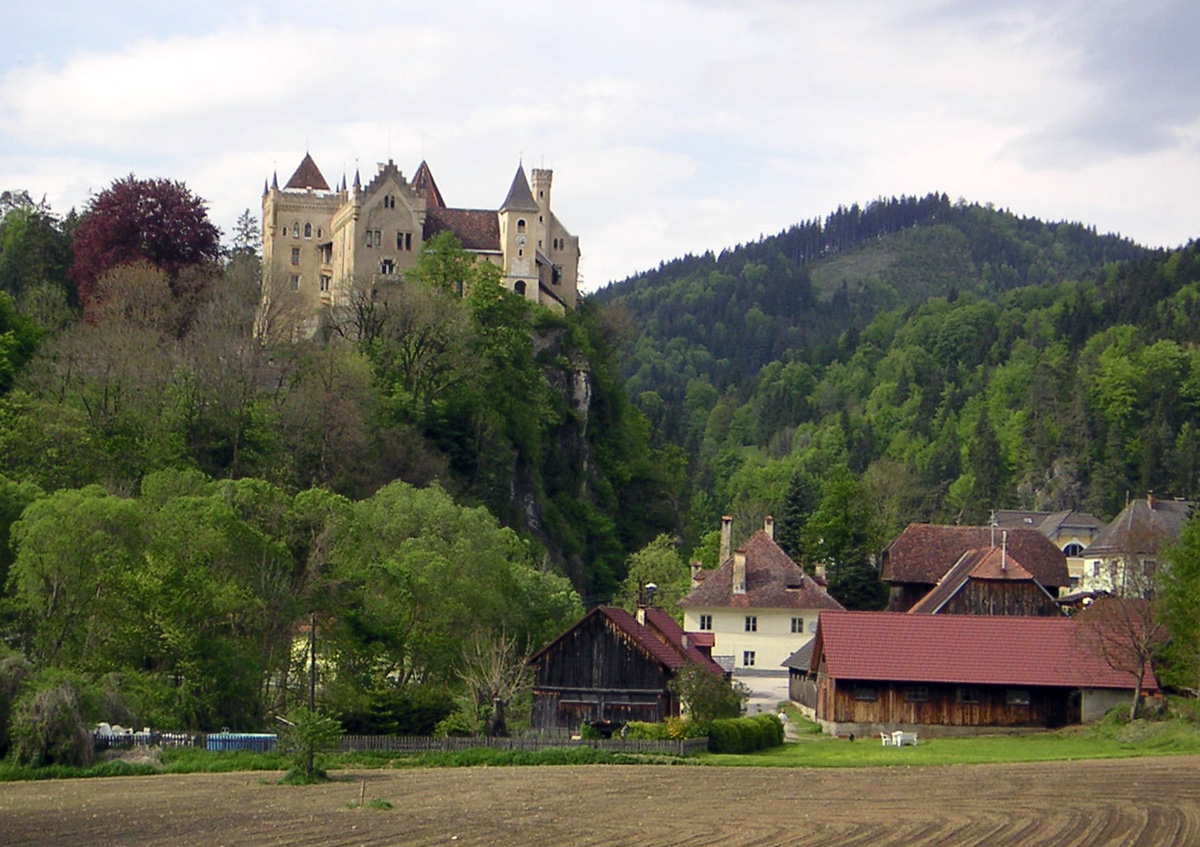

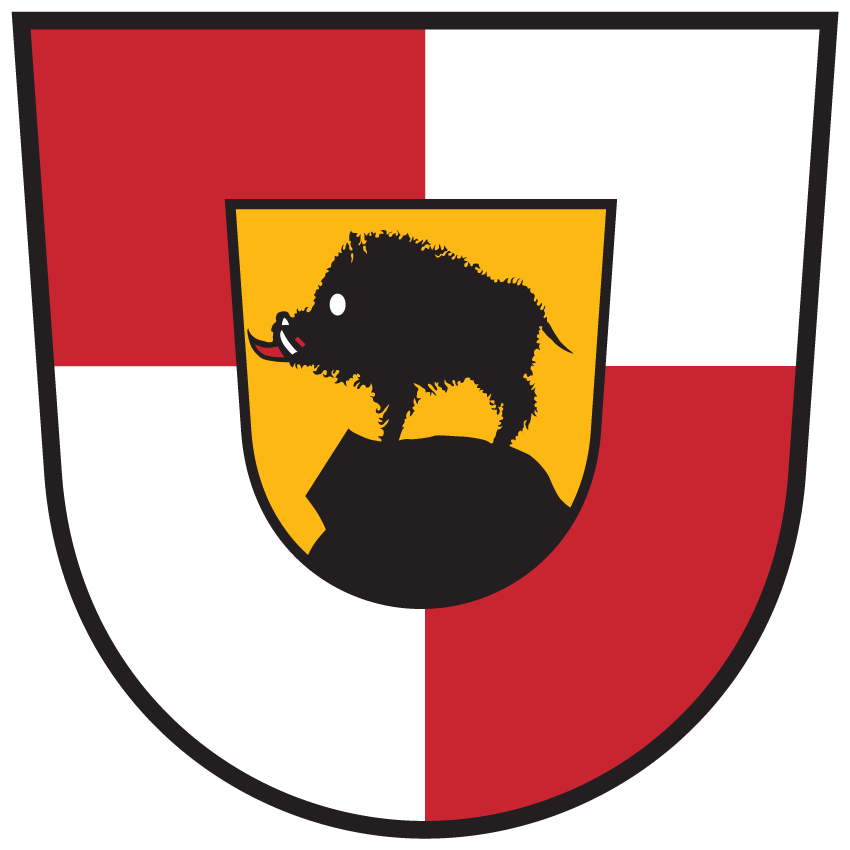
- Coat of arms

- Location within Austria
- Coordinates: 46°48′N 14°34′E
- Country: Austria
- State: Carinthia
- District: Sankt Veit an der Glan

Government
  - Mayor: Andreas Grabuschnig

Area
  - Total: 65.24 km^{2} (25.19 sq mi)
- Elevation: 580 m (1,900 ft)

Population (2018-01-01)
  - Total: 1,271
  - Density: 19.48/km^{2} (50.46/sq mi)
- Time zone: UTC+1 (CET)
  - Summer (DST): UTC+2 (CEST)
- Postal code: 9372
- Area code: 04264
- Website: www.eberstein.at

Eberstein (Slovenian: Svinec) is a town in the district of Sankt Veit an der Glan in the Austrian state of Carinthia.

== Geography ==
The municipality lies in the central Görtschitz valley at the foot of the Saualpe.

== World War II ==
Peter Pearson tells a story about the region on the BBC Website "WW2 People's War". He says that Signal Platoon of HQ Company 5th Battalion Sherwood Foresters came from Italy into Eberstein, Austria in 1945, and that it was

Somewhere in the area between St Viet and Neumark we eventually came to a stop in an idyllic picturesque village called Eberstein. It was the sort of place you see on Austrian postcards with a clear sparkling river (complete with trout) and green meadows full of wild flowers, and cows with tinkling bells round their necks. There was a castle here known as Schloss Eberstein.

He goes on to describe the surrender at Eberstein of 30,000 Cossack troops, with 20,000 horses, who had been fighting on the Axis side. They were eventually turned over to the Red Army at Judenburg as part of the Repatriation of Cossacks after WWII.
