= Guttaring =

- Municipality
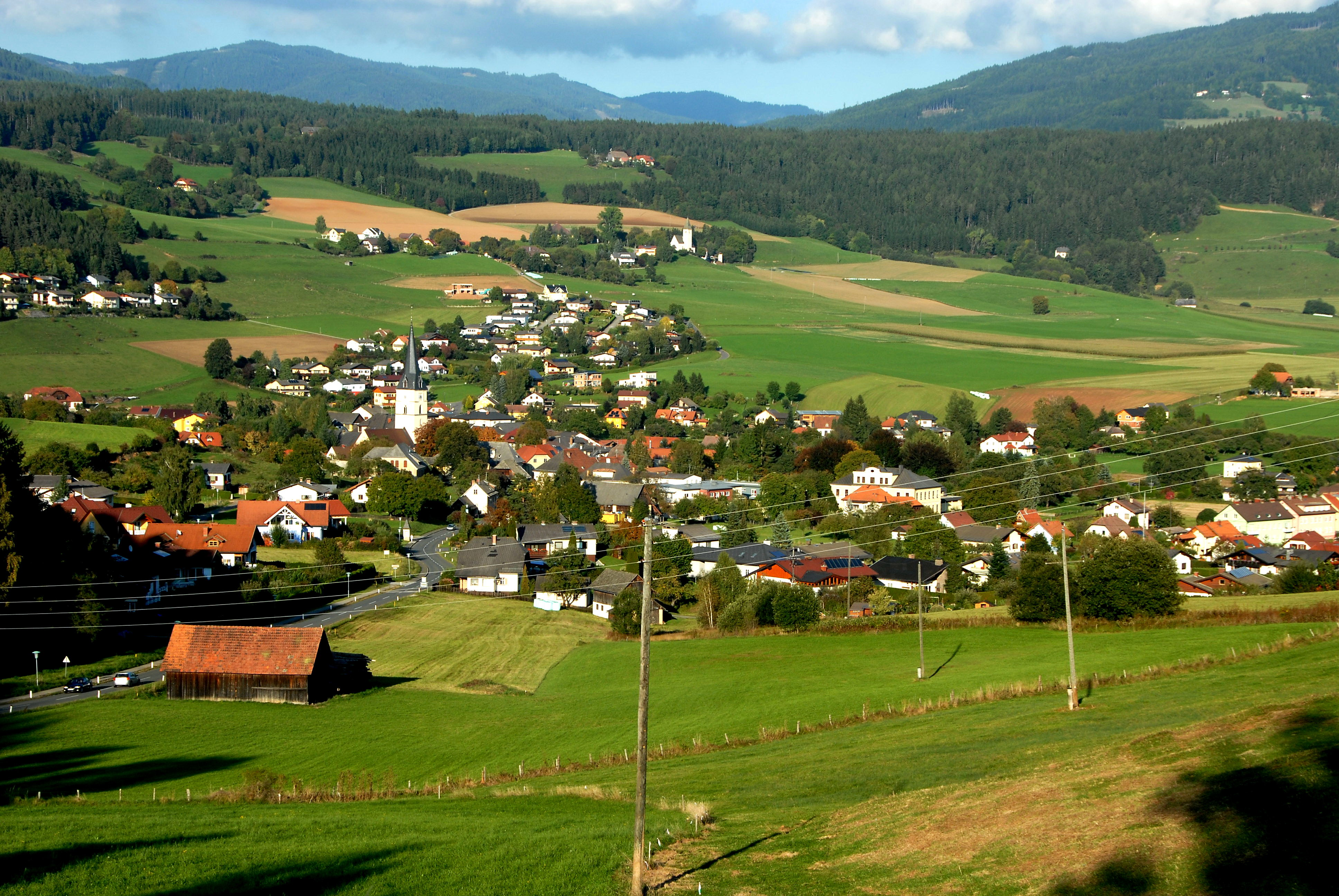
- View of Guttaring

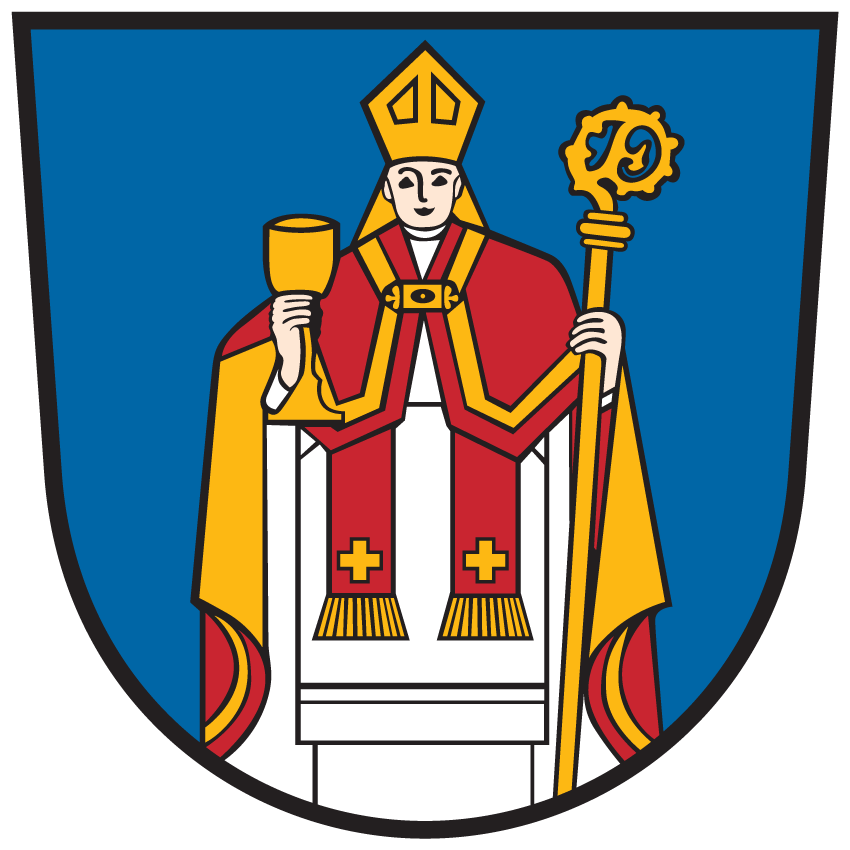
- Coat of arms

- Location within Austria
- Coordinates: 46°53′N 14°31′E
- Country: Austria
- State: Carinthia
- District: Sankt Veit an der Glan

Government
  - Mayor: Herbert Kuss

Area
  - Total: 54.93 km^{2} (21.21 sq mi)
- Elevation: 624 m (2,047 ft)

Population (2018-01-01)
  - Total: 1,470
  - Density: 26.8/km^{2} (69.3/sq mi)
- Time zone: UTC+1 (CET)
  - Summer (DST): UTC+2 (CEST)
- Postal code: 9334
- Area code: 04262
- Website: www.guttaring.at

Guttaring (Slovene: Kotarče) is a town in the district of Sankt Veit an der Glan in the Austrian state of Carinthia.

== Geography ==
Guttaring lies between Krappfeld and Görtschitztal and is traversed by the Silberbach.
