= Hochpustertal =

Valley in Tyrol, Austria

Coordinates: 46°43′55″N 12°17′47″E

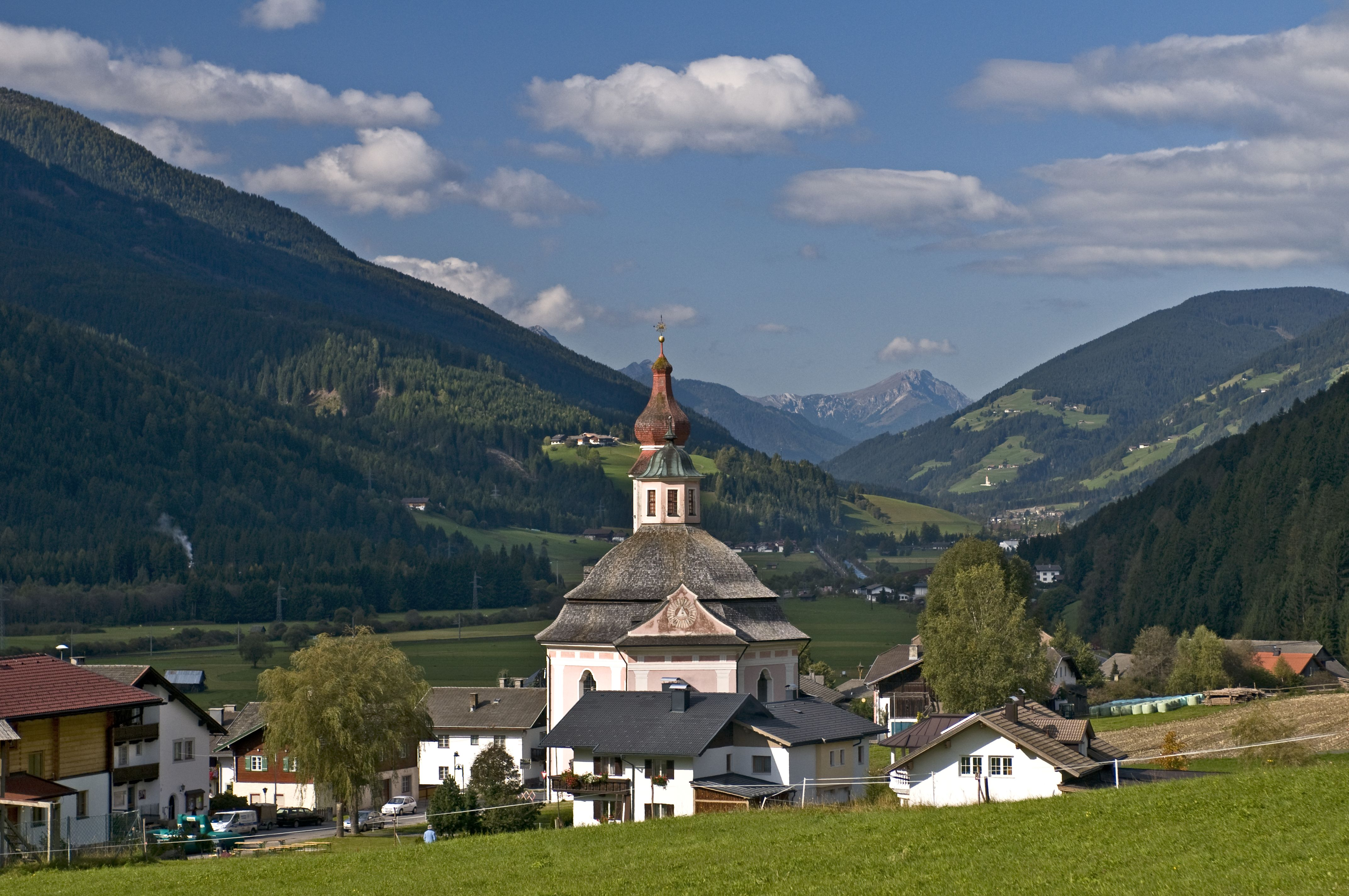
Hochpustertal in East Tyrol, Austria

The Hochpustertal (High Puster Valley, Italian: Alta Pusteria) is the easternmost part of the Puster Valley, stretching from the watershed of the Rienz and Drava rivers at Niederdorf in South Tyrol down the Drava to Lienz in East Tyrol, Austria. The area includes the Sexten and Prags side valleys.

According to the 1915 London Pact and the 1919 Treaty of Saint-Germain-en-Laye, the Italian-Austrian border was drawn between Innichen (San Candido) and Sillian. As the Rienz-Drava watershed near Toblach (called Toblacher Feld or Sella di Dobbiaco) is a rarely notable transition, the natural western boundaries of the Hochpustertal vary. Usually, in the valley the following municipalities are included:

- Niederdorf, Sexten, Prags, Toblach, and Innichen in South Tyrol,
- Sillian, Strassen, Abfaltersbach, Assling, and Leisach in East Tyrol.
