= Kartitsch =

- Municipality
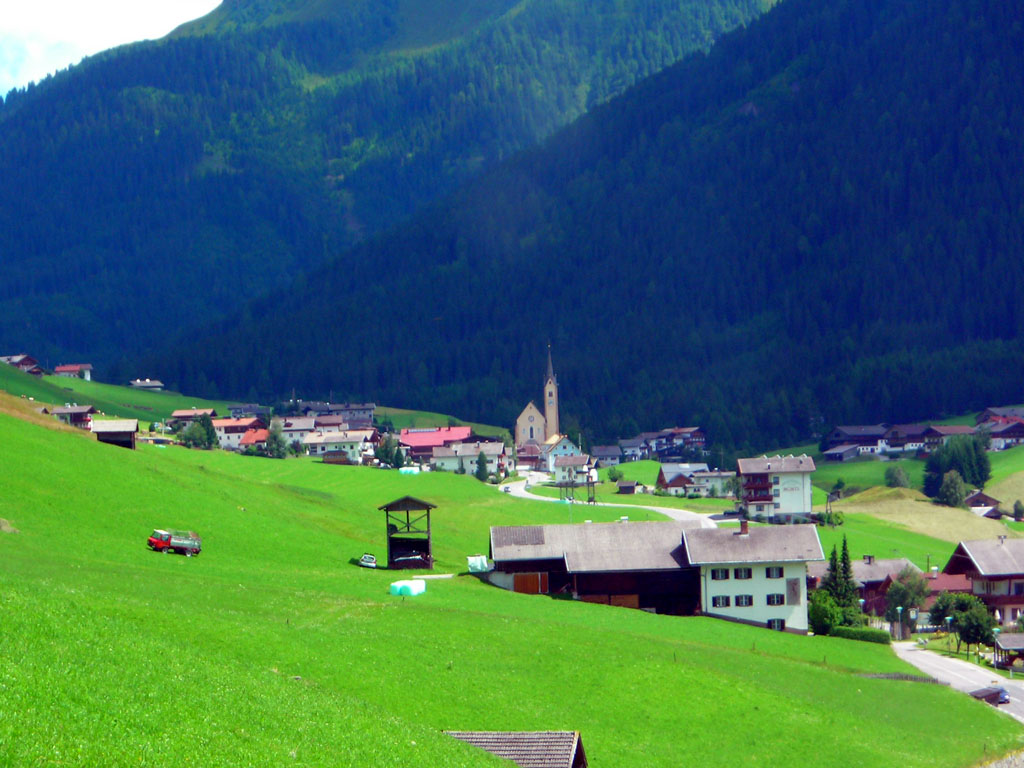

- Coat of arms

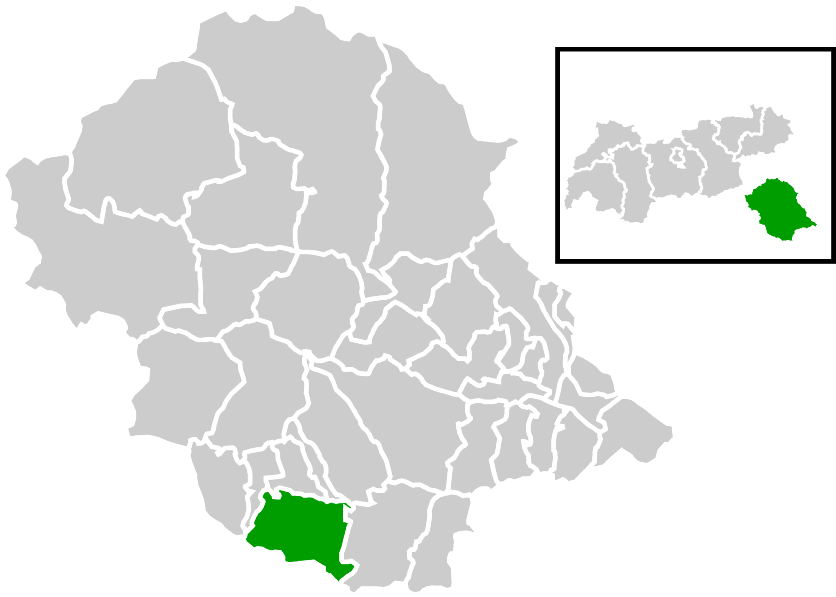
- Location within Lienz district

- Location within Austria
- Coordinates: 46°43′00″N 12°29′00″E
- Country: Austria
- State: Tyrol
- District: Lienz

Government
  - Mayor: Alois Klammer

Area
  - Total: 58.91 km^{2} (22.75 sq mi)
- Elevation: 1,353 m (4,439 ft)

Population (2018-01-01)
  - Total: 803
  - Density: 13.6/km^{2} (35.3/sq mi)
- Time zone: UTC+1 (CET)
  - Summer (DST): UTC+2 (CEST)
- Postal code: 9941
- Area code: 04848
- Vehicle registration: LZ
- Website: www.kartitsch.at

Kartitsch is a municipality in the district of Lienz in the Austrian state of Tyrol.

== Geography ==
Kartitsch lies on both sides of the Gail River, near its confluence with the Puster Valley. The municipal area of Kartitsch is bounded in the north of the western foothills of the Lienzer Dolomites and to the south of the Carnic Alps, which contains the border with Italy. The municipality contains villages, such as Sankt Oswald. It lies near other Austrian municipalities, such as Abfaltersbach, Anras, Heinfels, Obertilliach, Sillian, and Strassen.

== Population ==
Historical population
Year	Pop.	±%
1971	1,002	—
1981	1,006	+0.4%
1991	922	−8.3%
2001	897	−2.7%

== Coat of arms ==
The coat of arms of the Kartitsch is a rising golden crescent on a blue field. In 1465, the Frederick III, Holy Roman Emperor, awarded the coat of arms to Hans and Jacob Wiser, leading men of the municipality.

== Tourism ==
Both tourism and agriculture form the basis of the local economy. In 2003, Kartitsch had 84,000 visitor-nights. Local points of interest include:

- The Parish Church of St. Leonhard: a Gothic church completed in 1479, with a high altar from the years 1761–1763.
- The 'Our Lady' Church: built in 1680 to 1685, one of the notable early Baroque churches in the area. The stucco frames came from the workshop of Gallus Apeller in Innsbruck. The Church is located in Hollbruck.
