= Gaimberg =

- Municipality
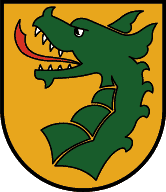
- Coat of arms

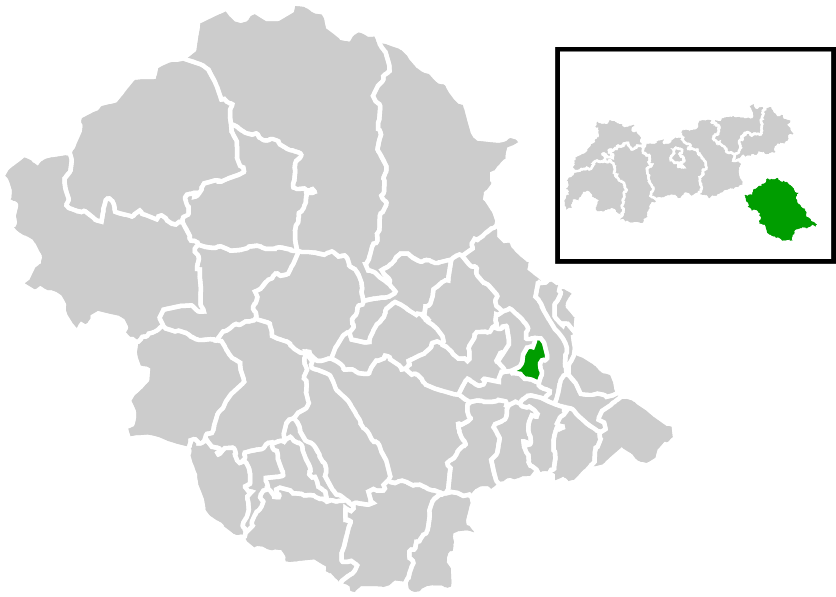
- Location within Lienz district

- Location within Austria
- Coordinates: 46°50′43″N 12°47′08″E
- Country: Austria
- State: Tyrol
- District: Lienz

Government
  - Mayor: Bernhard Webhofer

Area
  - Total: 7.28 km^{2} (2.81 sq mi)
- Elevation: 758 m (2,487 ft)

Population (2018-01-01)
  - Total: 822
  - Density: 113/km^{2} (292/sq mi)
- Time zone: UTC+1 (CET)
  - Summer (DST): UTC+2 (CEST)
- Postal code: 9900
- Area code: 04852
- Vehicle registration: LZ
- Website: www.gaimberg.at

Gaimberg is a municipality in the district of Lienz in the Austrian state of Tyrol. It is situated north of the town of Lienz. The neighbouring municipalities are Lienz, Nußdorf-Debant, and Thurn. The municipality consists of the following neighbourhoods: Grafendorf, Obergaimberg, Untergaimberg, Kranzhofsiedlung and Wartschensiedlung.

== Population ==
Historical population
Year	Pop.	±%
1869	393	—
1880	436	+10.9%
1890	335	−23.2%
1900	326	−2.7%
1910	343	+5.2%
1923	328	−4.4%
1934	381	+16.2%
1939	414	+8.7%
1951	433	+4.6%
1961	492	+13.6%
1971	617	+25.4%
1981	709	+14.9%
1991	707	−0.3%
2001	767	+8.5%
2011	835	+8.9%
