= Sexten =

Comune and village in South Tyrol in northern Italy

- Comune
- Gemeinde Sexten; Comune di Sesto
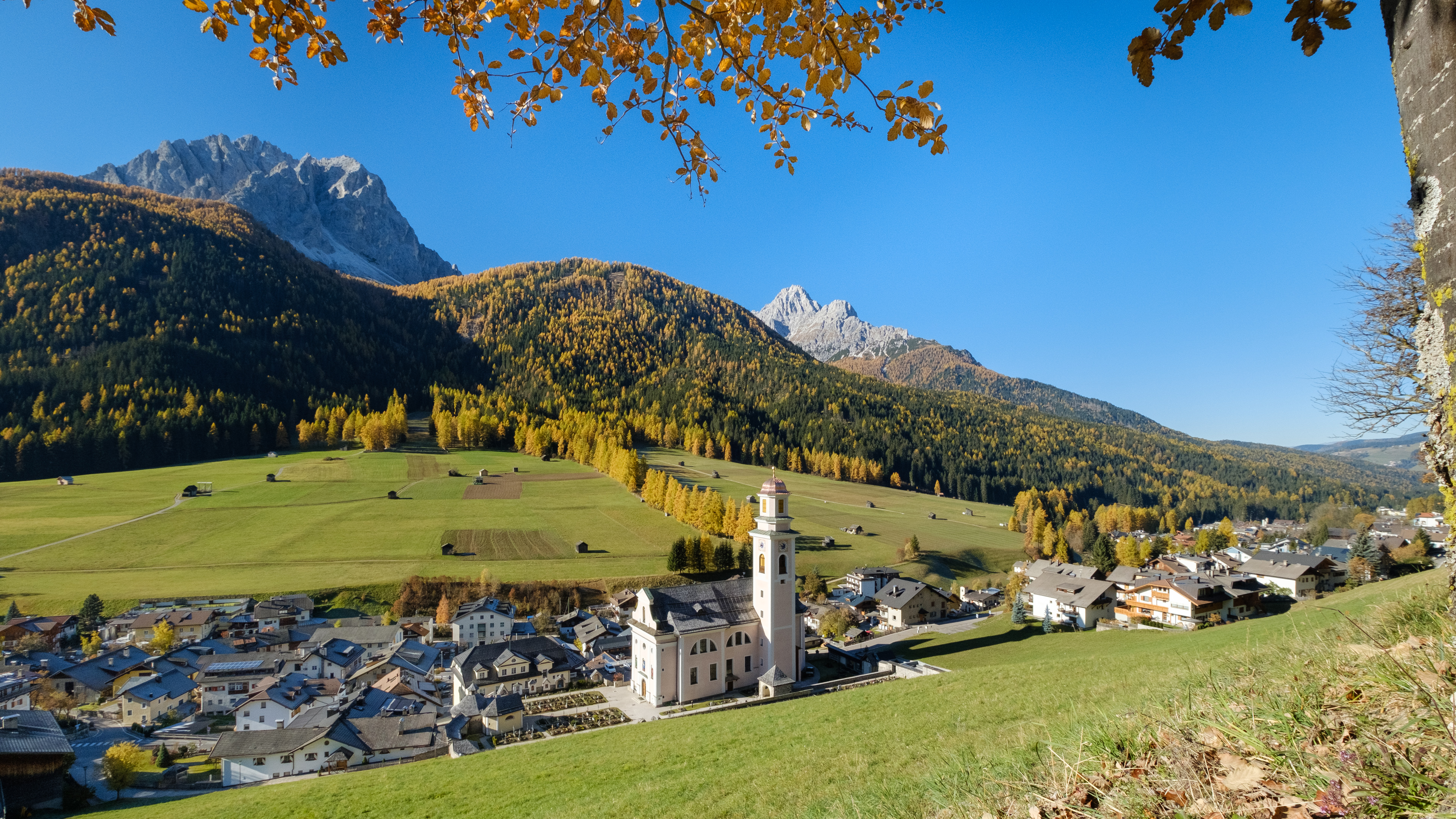
- View of Sexten

- Coat of arms

- Location within Italy Location within Trentino-Alto Adige/Südtirol
- Coordinates: 46°42′N 12°21′E
- Country: Italy
- Region: Trentino-Alto Adige/Südtirol
- Province: South Tyrol (BZ)
- Frazioni: Kiniger (Quiniga), Mitterberg (Monte di Mezzo), Schmieden (Ferrara), St. Veit (San Vito), Moos (Moso)

Government
  - Mayor: Thomas Summerer (SVP)

Area
  - Total: 80 km^{2} (31 sq mi)
- Elevation: 1,310 m (4,300 ft)

Population (31-07-2025)
  - Total: 1,817
  - Density: 23/km^{2} (59/sq mi)
- Demonym(s): German: Sextner; Italian: di Sesto
- Time zone: UTC+1 (CET)
  - Summer (DST): UTC+2 (CEST)
- Postal code: 39030
- Dialing code: 0474
- Website: Official website

Sexten (German pronunciation: [ˈsɛkstn̩]; Italian: Sesto [ˈsɛsto]) is a comune and a village in South Tyrol in northern Italy. The village is famous as a summer and winter sport resort in the mountains.

== Linguistic distribution ==
According to the 2024 census, 92.37% of the population speak German, 7.38% Italian and 0.25% Ladin as first language.

== Geography ==
The town sits in a branch of the Puster Valley, near Innichen and Toblach, where the Drava rises. The district borders East Tyrol, Austria, to the north and the border is formed by the Carnic Alps. To the south lie the eponymous Sexten Dolomites and nature park, which includes the famous Drei Zinnen (Tre Cime di Lavaredo).

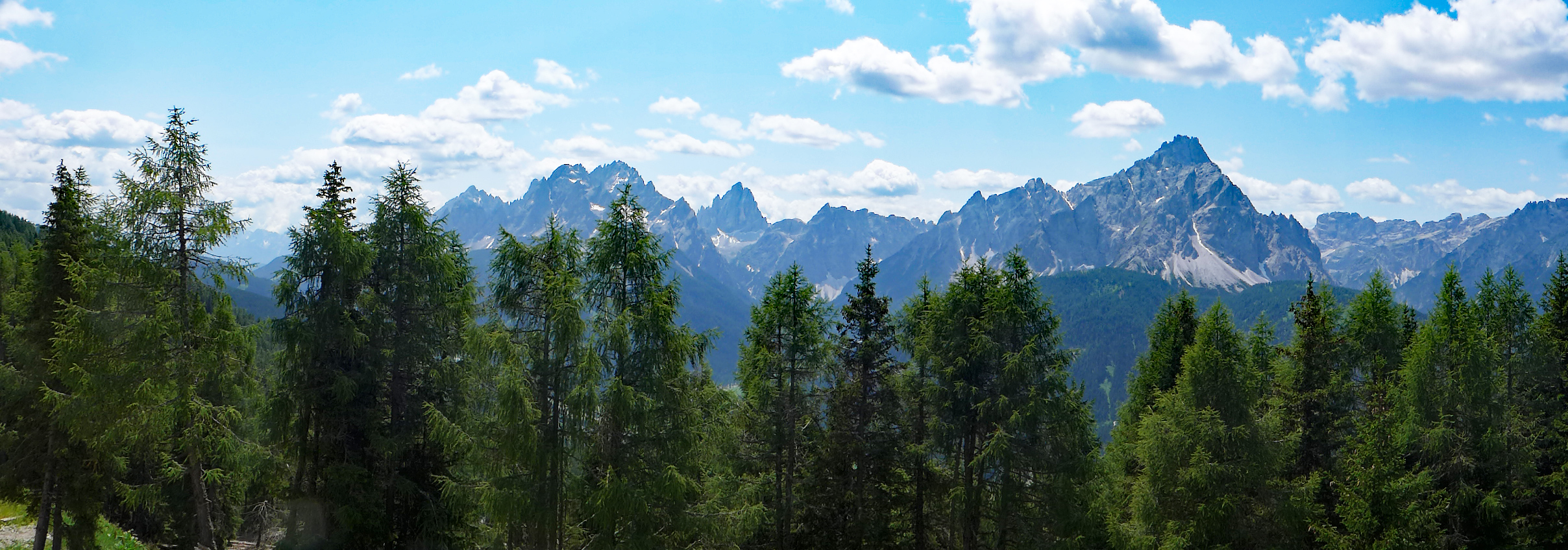
Sexten Dolomites seen from Mount Elmo

The municipality is bordered, clockwise from the west, by Toblach, Innichen, Sillian (Austria), Kartitsch (Austria), Comelico Superiore (Belluno) and Auronzo di Cadore (Belluno).

== History ==
The village's name is of Latin origin: ad horam sextam, meaning "at the sixth hour", referring to its location south of Innichen. Sexta is documented starting from 965 AD, due to its connections to the Bavarian Prince-Bishopric of Freising. During World War I, Sexten was on the front line between Italy and the Austro-Hungarian Empire, and suffered much damage.

It was occupied by Italy in November 1918, descending from the Monte Croce di Comelico pass. However, if the terms of the Paris peace conference had been applied to the letter, the town would have remained Austrian, as it was located east of the Toblach Saddle, a physical border and watershed; however, this did not happen and by 1920 Sexten had passed under Italian sovereignty. Later it received further fortifications during the Fascist Era.

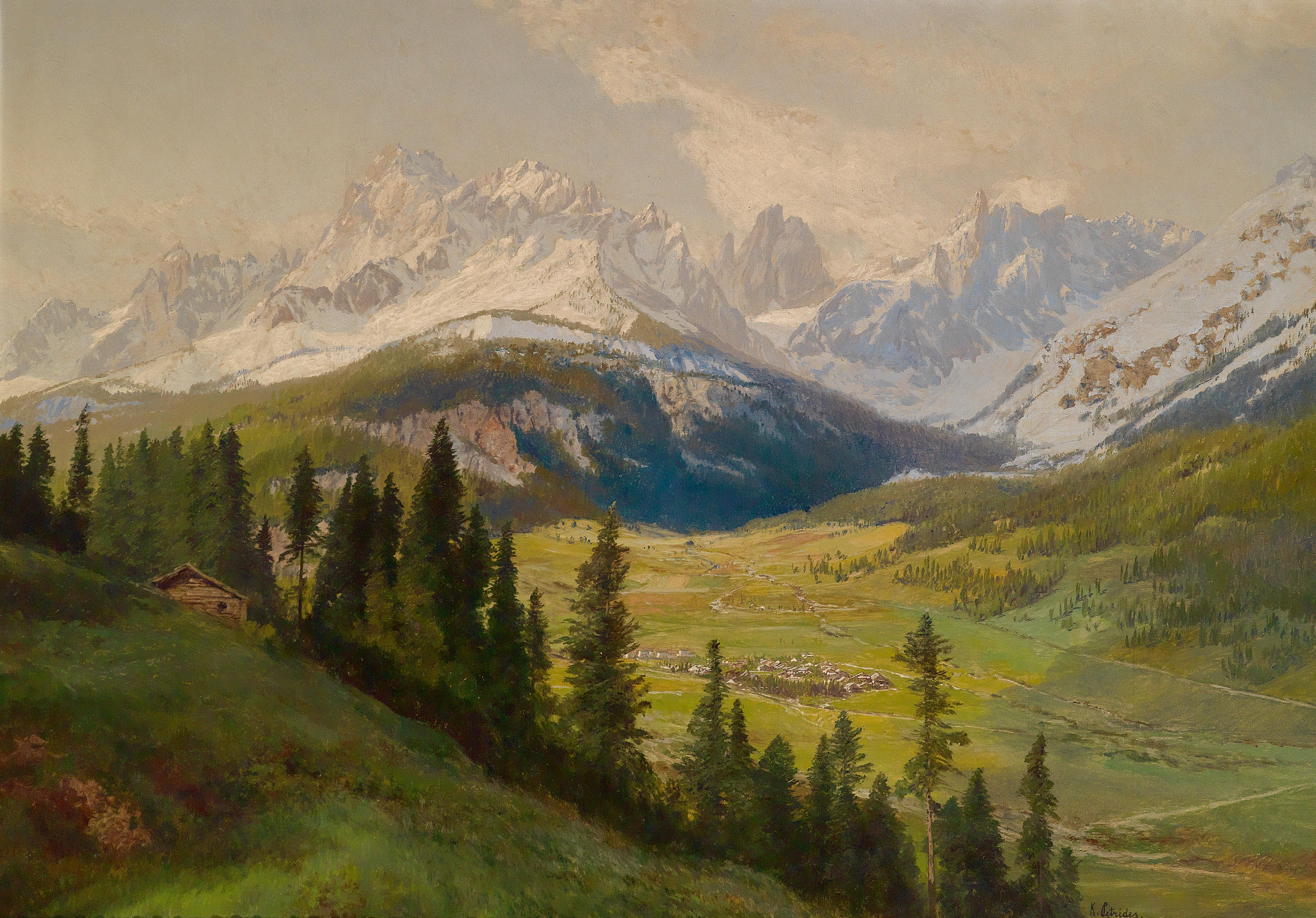
Historical view of Sexten and the "Sexten Sundial" (Sexten Dolomites) in an oil painting by Konrad Petrides around 1900

== Coat-of-arms ==
The emblem is azure and represents three argent peaks with a sable chamois standing in the centre; the three peaks symbolize the Drei Zinnen-Tre Cime di Lavaredo. The emblem was granted in 1972 but was in use before World War I.

However, this symbol pre-existed its formal adoption: it had been affixed above the entrance to the town hall since the end of the First World War. The design is attributed to the painter Albert Stolz.

The gonfalon is a flag divided into white and red.

== Twin towns ==
Sexten is twinned with:

- Sankt Veit in Defereggen, Austria
- Zermatt, Switzerland

== Notable people ==
- Hilarius of Sexten (1839–1900), Austrian Capuchin moral theologian
- Michael Innerkofler (1848–1888), Austro-Hungarian mountaineer
- Patrick Holzer (born 1970), alpine skier
- Jannik Sinner (born 2001), tennis player

== See also ==
- Sextental
