= Lavant, Tyrol =

Lavant
- Municipality
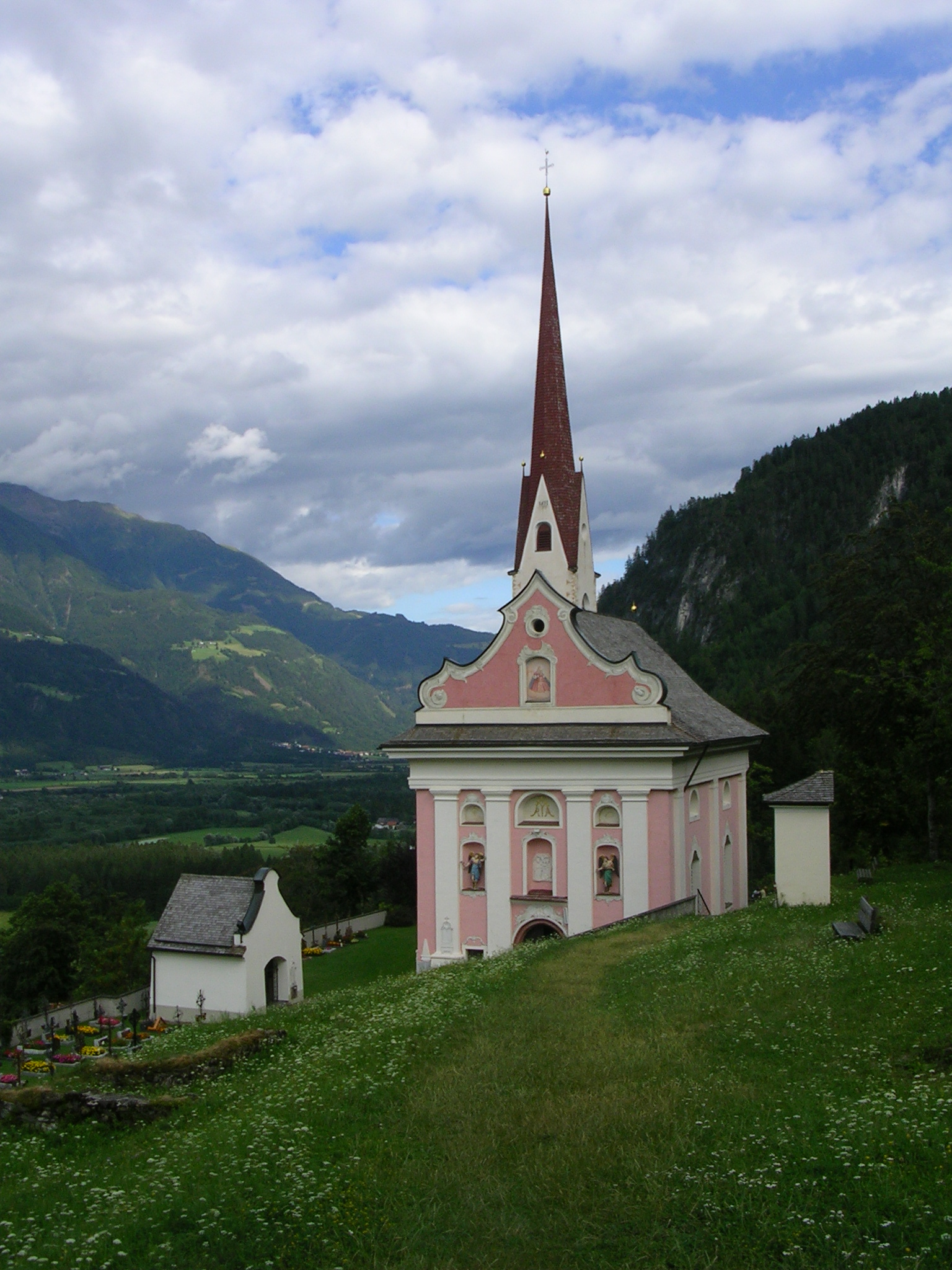
- St. Ulrich Pilgrimage Church, Lavant, Austria

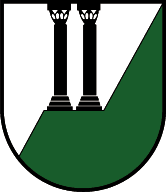
- Coat of arms

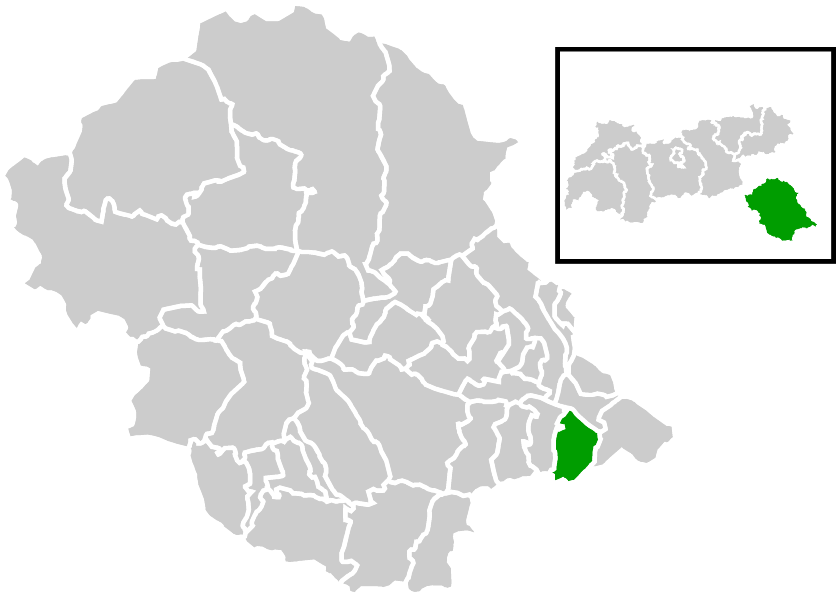
- Location within Lienz district

- Location within Austria
- Coordinates: 46°47′56″N 12°50′17″E
- Country: Austria
- State: Tyrol
- District: Lienz

Government
  - Mayor: Oswald Kuenz

Area
  - Total: 22.55 km^{2} (8.71 sq mi)
- Elevation: 675 m (2,215 ft)

Population (2021)
  - Total: 339
  - Density: 15.0/km^{2} (38.9/sq mi)
- Time zone: UTC+1 (CET)
  - Summer (DST): UTC+2 (CEST)
- Postal code: 9972
- Area code: 0 48 52
- Vehicle registration: LZ
- Website: www.gemeindelavant.at

Lavant is a municipality in the district of Lienz in the upper Drautal valley in East Tyrol, Austria. It is located southeast of the city of Lienz.

== History ==
After the fifth century, Lavant replaced the ancient Roman settlement of Aguntum. In 1948, archaeological ruins from the late Roman and early Christian period were discovered on the Kirchbichl mountain. These discoveries included the remains of a castle with episcopal residence, a Roman temple with tombs and votive altars dating from the second and third centuries, a fortification gate flanked by two towers, and an early Christian church built in four phases, dating from the fourth century. The church was destroyed in the seventh century, and replaced at a later period. The parish church was first mentioned in 1090.

== Landmarks ==
The Gothic Sts. Peter and Paul Church was built in 1485 on top of a fortification building from the Middle Ages. The church contains a Romanesque vault, remains of Gothic winged altars, and a flat Gothic wooden ceiling from 1516.

The St. Ulrich Pilgrimage Church at Lavant dates from the seventeenth century, and includes a tower, west gate, and choir preserved from the Gothic period. The church was renovated in 1770, and frescoes, rocaille paintings, and interiors were added at a later period.

== Gallery ==
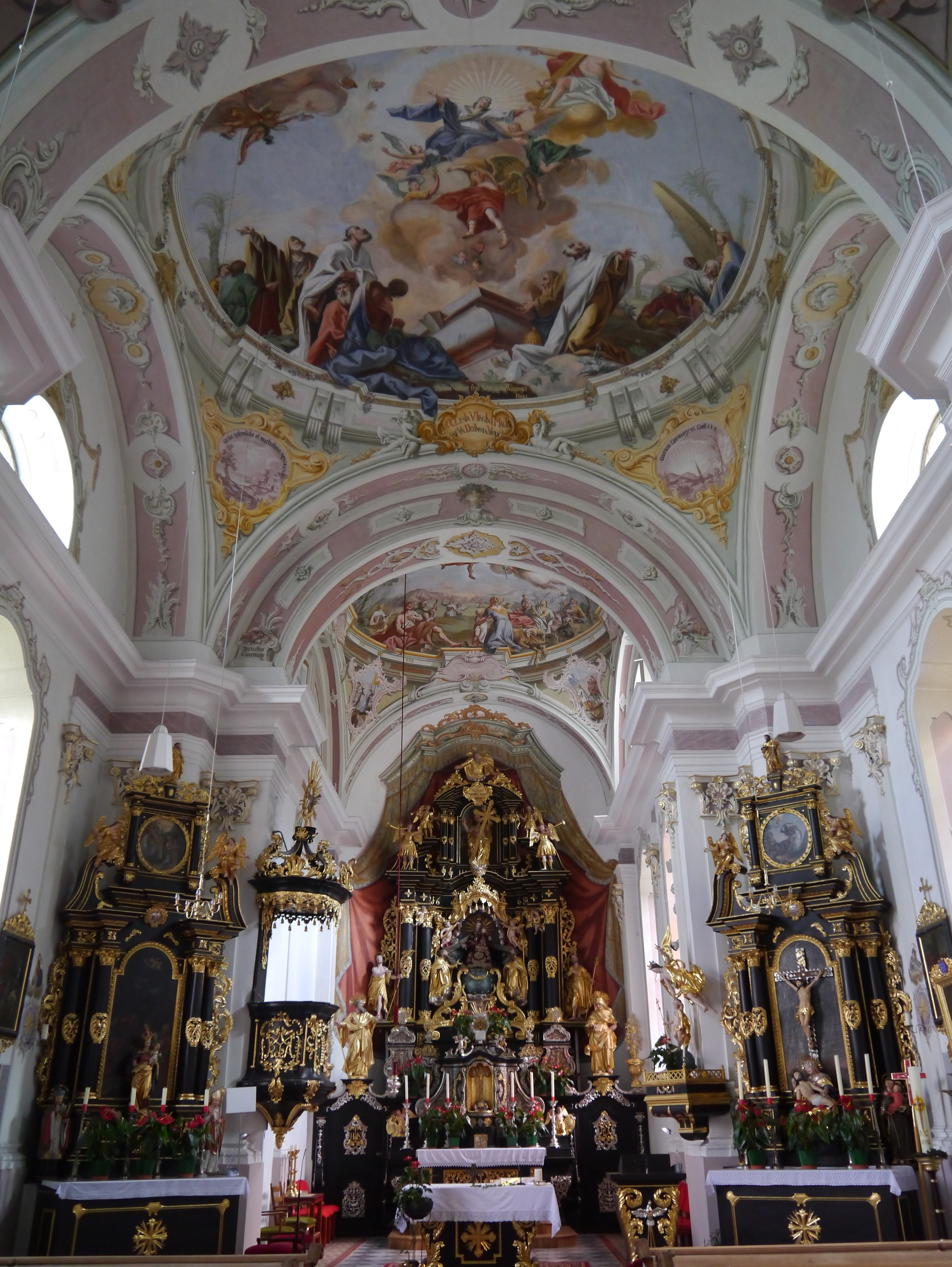
St. Ulrich Parish Church interior

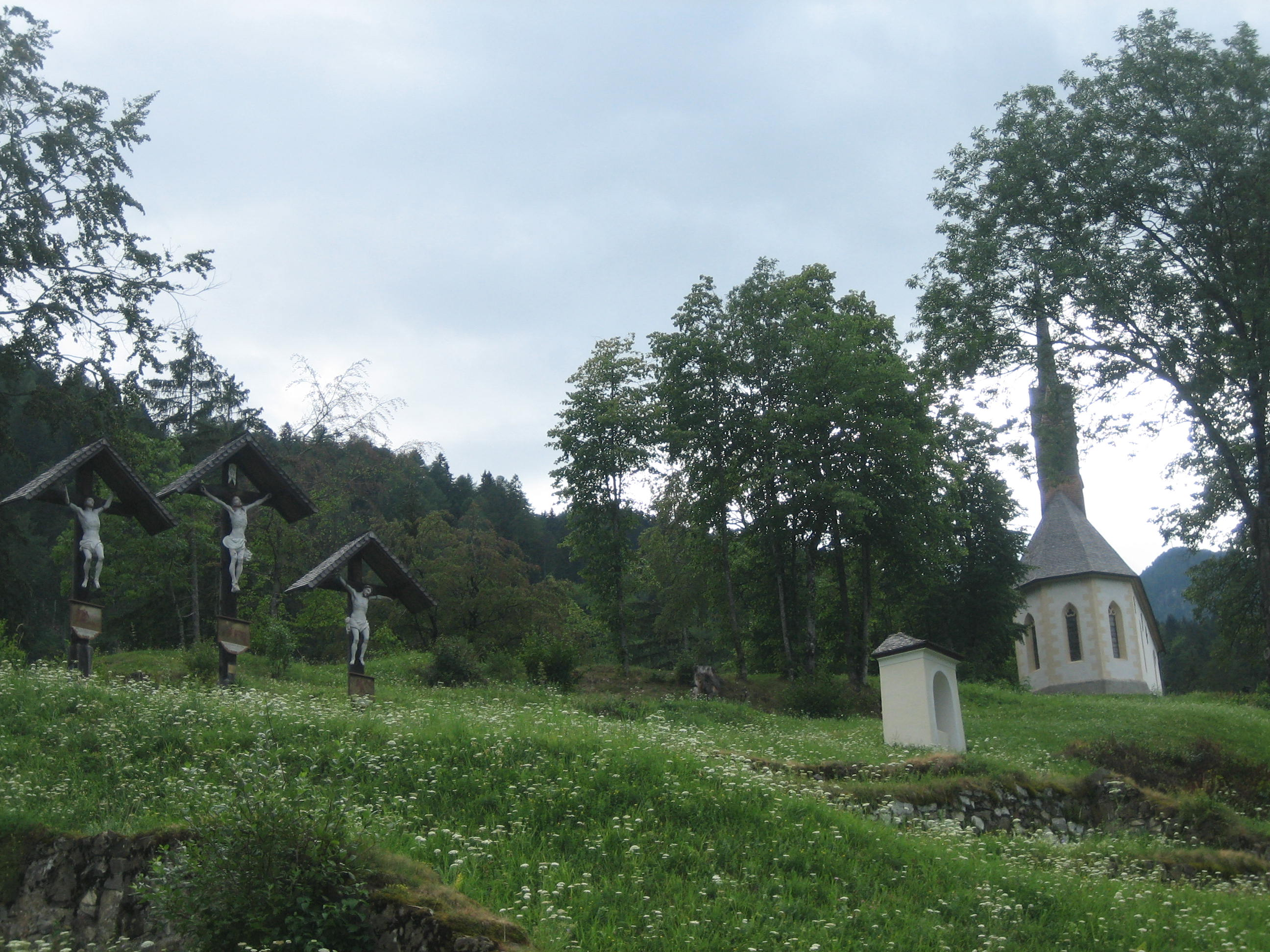
Sts. Peter and Paul Church

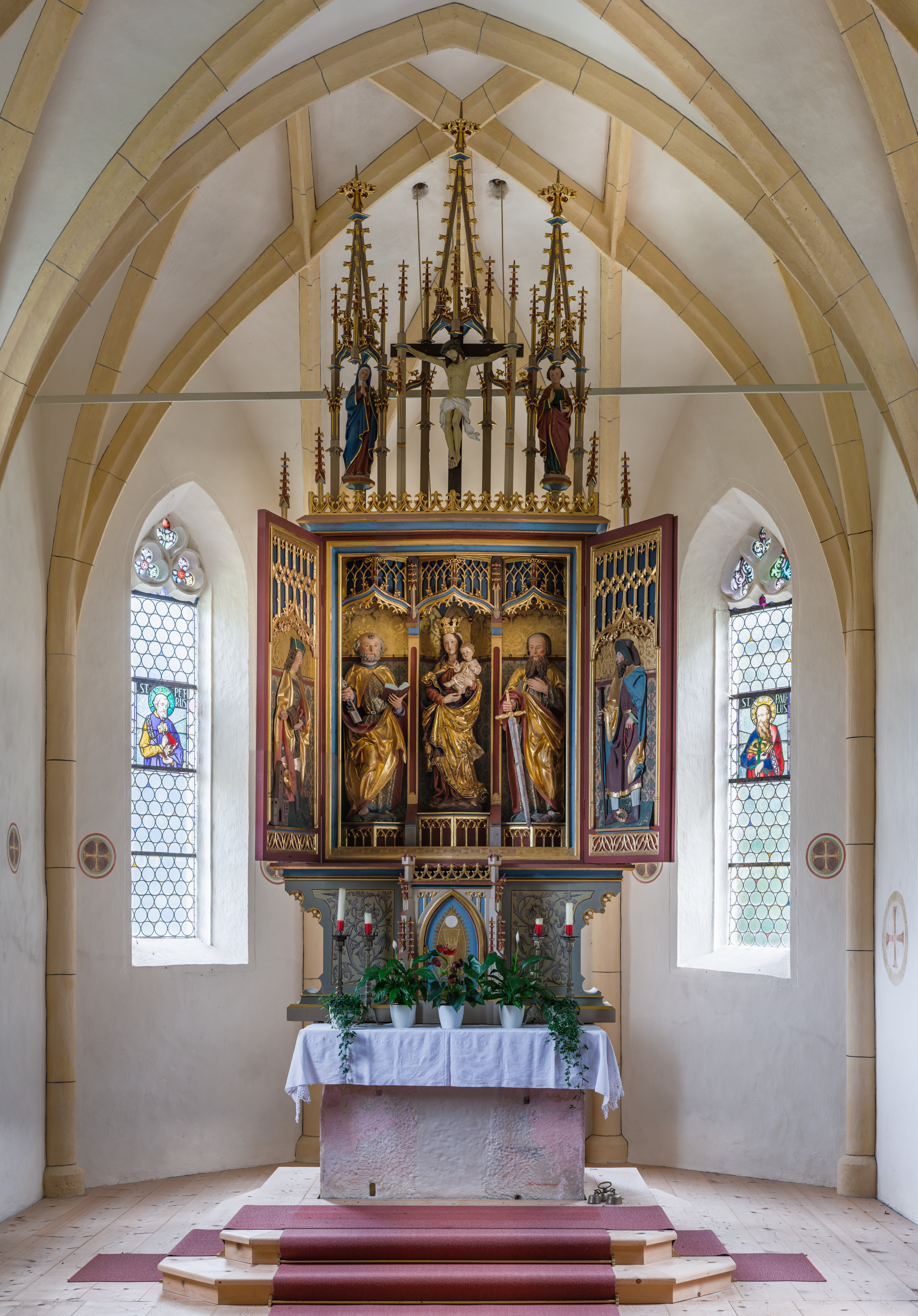
Lavant St. Peter und Paul Hochaltar
