= Pius Walder =

Austrian lumberjack and poacher

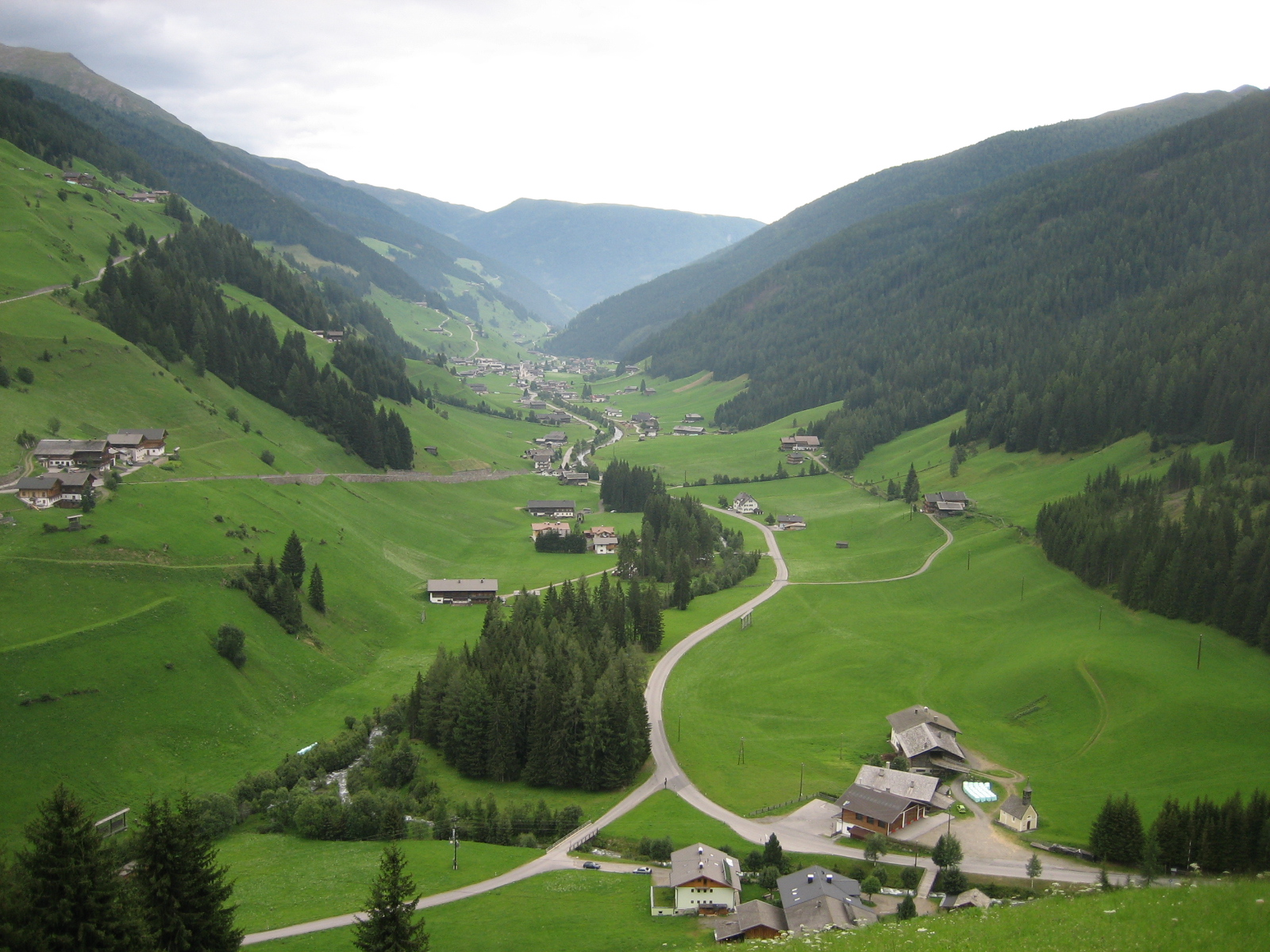
Innervillgraten main valley

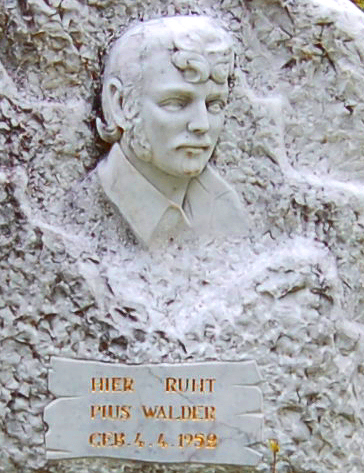
Tombstone of Pius Walder

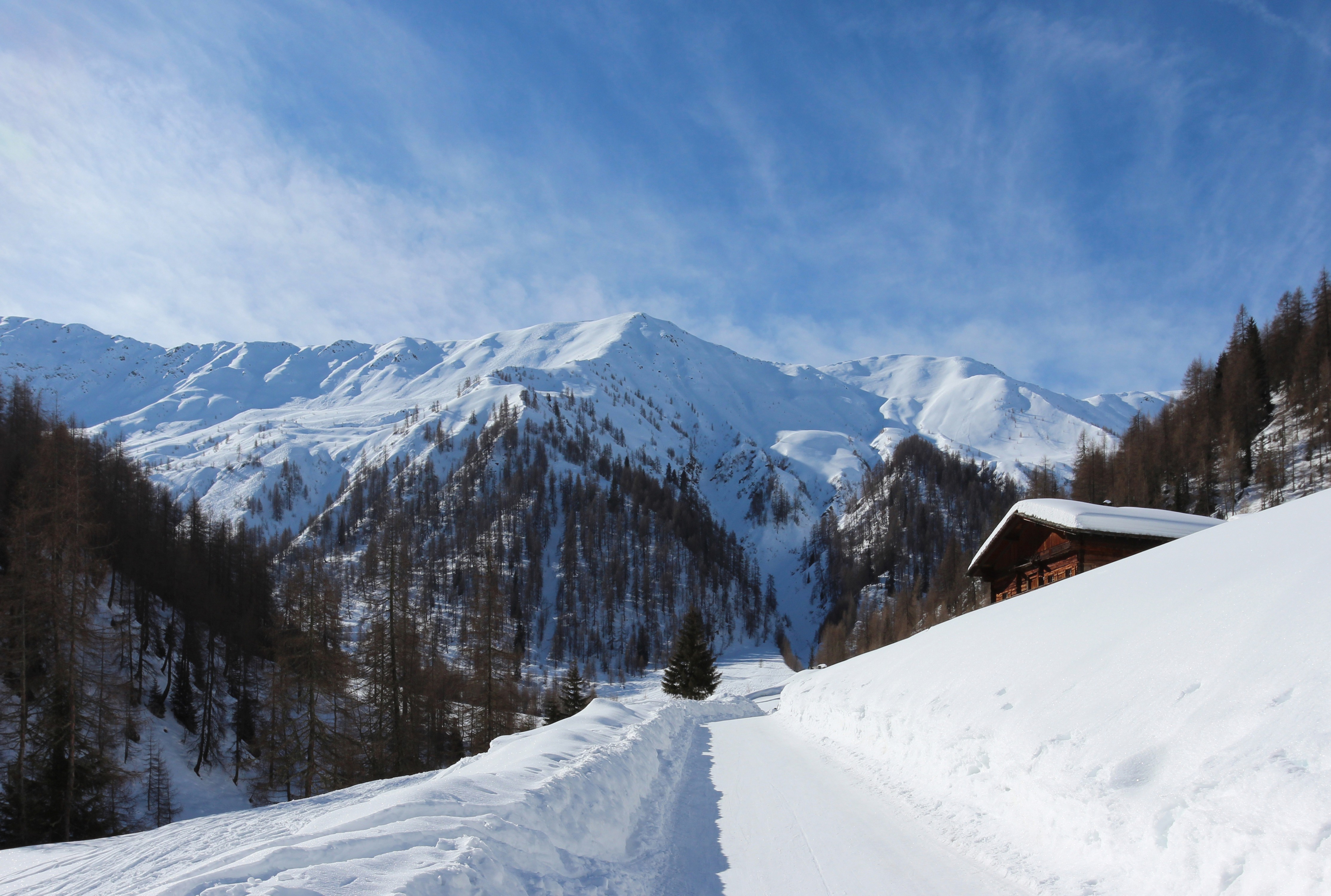
Winter view from Kalkstein, close to the scene of the shooting

Pius Walder (4 April 1952 in the Villgraten valley – 8 September 1982 in Kalkstein, a part of Innervillgraten in the Villgraten valley, Austria) was an Austrian lumberjack and poacher. His life and violent death led to ongoing conflicts in his home town and have been depicted in movies and books.

== Background ==
Pius Walder was the youngest of twelve children, born in the family of Josef Walder from Innervillgraten and his wife Anna Senfter from Außervillgraten. Walder's home community is a Streusiedlung with various farms spread out on the Kirchweiler Kalkstein in the Tauern mountains at an altitude of 1,640 metres (5,380 ft). The Villgraten valley is a tributary of the Pustertal. The western and eastern borders of the community border the Südtirol in Italy. The valley is one of the most remote regions in Austria; year-round access was only established in 1956.

Walder never married. He was a lumberjack by trade and he and his brothers were also poachers. On 8 September 1982 he was observed at dusk with blackened face and carrying a rifle, and was shot by Johann Schett, a forester and state hunter. Schett was later sentenced to three years in prison for Körperverletzung mit tödlichem Ausgang (a lower grade of manslaughter) and was released after 18 months. The comparatively lenient sentence was viewed with contempt by Walder's family.

== Death and aftermath ==
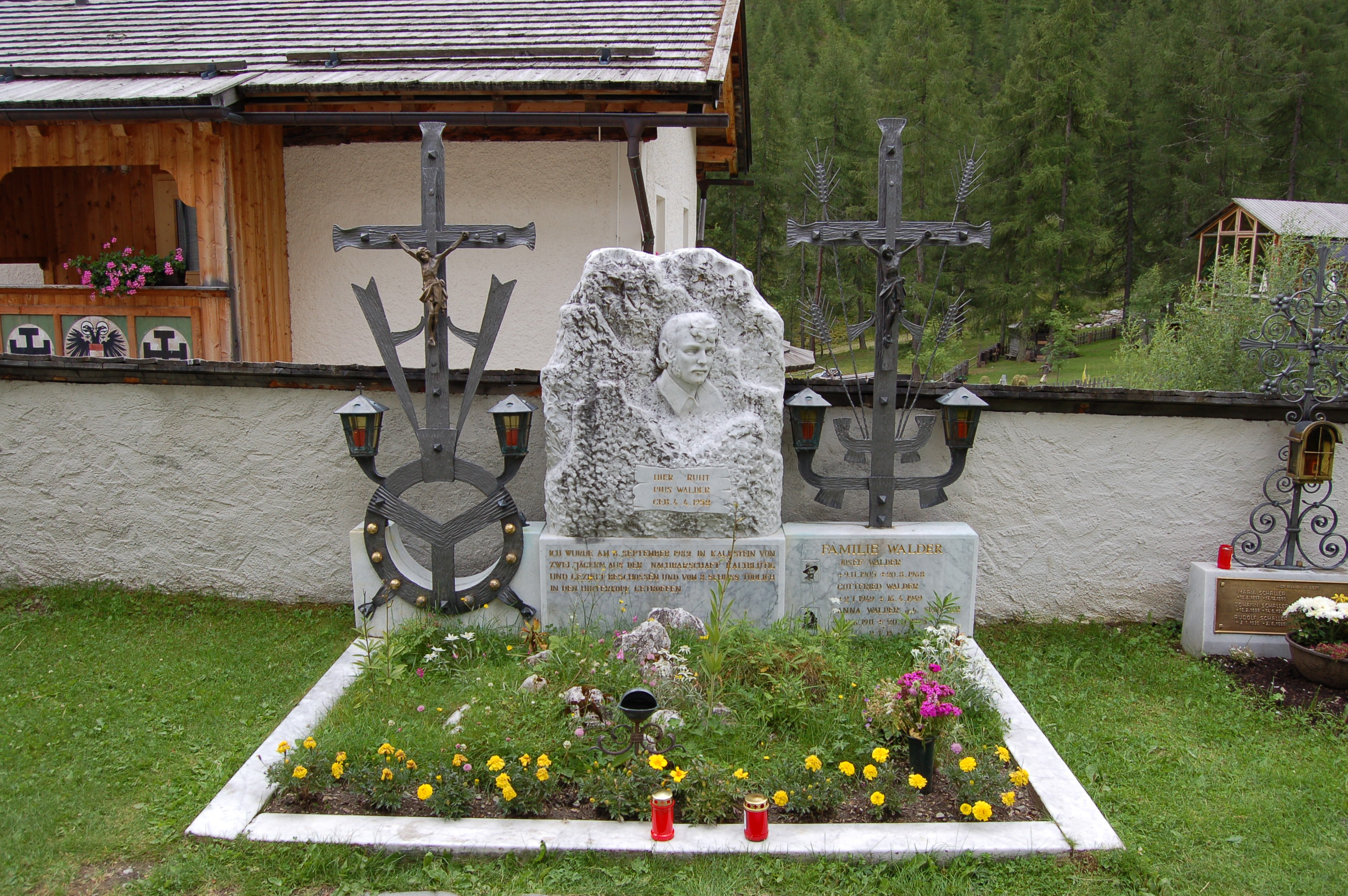
Walder family grave in Kalkstein

The forester Johann Bergmann said that he had heard shots on 8 September and alerted his colleagues Schett and Schaller. They spotted Walder more than 100 metres (110 yd) away. They called to him and when he tried to run away, Schett shot him in the back of his head. However, Walder's gun had not been used that day. Walder's brother assumed that the hunters had killed him on purpose. Walder's gravestone and the death notice refer to his death as murder. The gravestone bears the claim: Ich wurde am 8. September 1982 in Kalkstein von zwei Jägern aus der Nachbarschaft kaltblütig und gezielt beschossen und vom 8. Schuss tödlich in den Hinterkopf getroffen (On 8 September 1982 I was shot in Kalkstein by two hunters from the neighborhood, in cold blood and deliberately, and the 8th shot hit the back of my head with deadly force). In 2012 one of the Walder brothers disturbed the burial of Schett 30 years later with loud accusations of murder.

About 1,000 guests were present at Walder's burial. When the local priest wanted to remove the death notice with the murder accusations from the church, he was beaten by a Walder brother, a turning point in the local community as the brothers began to lose a lot of sympathy then. The brothers had a further quarrel with Bergmann at a further burial, Bergmann had to be treated in a hospital, and the brothers were convicted and had to pay large fines.

== Further coverage ==
In the local community, the Walder brothers grew more and more isolated because of their violent behavior. Pius' grave and various sites of his life and death attracted tourists, and various media reported on the ongoing quarrels. The brothers' ongoing anger about the alleged murder and their continued claims about the lack of justice were the topic of books and films. The brothers received fines for distributing flyers with an image of the dead Pius at the High Tauern tunnel entrance. A meeting of some of the involved persons on an ORF talkshow led to a violent quarrel live on camera, and some women of the families involved had violent quarrels at local markets. Similar as with popular Bavarian poacher Georg Jennerwein (1848 – 1877) the grave has been decorated with poached game now and then. In 2011, a formal "Poachers Ball" in Vienna commemorated Walder and Jennerwein. Author Winfried Werner Linde used the story in his book Die Walder-Saga. Felix Mitterer used the death of Walder for an Austrian Tatort police procedural film. Tatort is the longest-running German-language television series of that sort, set in various parts of Germany, Austria and Switzerland. The series is being broadcast in these countries as well in Scandinavia. The film used some of the aspects of the Walder case and used the phrase Elvis lebt! (Elvis is alive) in its title, referring to Pius' hairstyle and sideburns. The TV production staged the deadly shots on 16 August and used the coincidence with the anniversary of the King's death to prove that Pius was murdered, since he never would have gone poaching on that day of memorial.

Sociologist Roland Girtler wrote a study of Walder's death in a "cookbook for poached game". Girtler saw the case as evidence of a change in attitude towards poaching – while poachers had strong local support until the early 20th century, Walder's case showed a significant change in attitudes. Urban citizens still had some sympathy for the hillbilly rebel, while the local community were much less in favor.
