= Hilarius of Sexten =

Austrian Capuchin moral theologian

Hilarius of Sexten (secular name: Christian Gatterer) (1839, in the valley of Sexten in the county of Tyrol – 20 October 1900) was an Austrian Capuchin moral theologian.

== Life ==
After a course of studies at Brixen, he entered the Capuchin Franciscan Order in 1858 and was ordained priest in 1862. Having labored in parochial duties for some years, he was appointed to teach moral theology at Meran in 1872. Both secular and regular clergy consulted him in difficult cases.

In 1882 he was appointed examiner of confessors for the Diocese of Trent. He fulfilled many offices in his order, being at different times lector, guardian, definitor, and minister-provincial. In this last office, which he filled 1889–1892, he accepted for his province of the Tyrol a missionary district in India.

== Works ==
At the special command of the general of the order, he published his "Compendium Theologiae Moralis" (Meran, 1889). Later, at the request of the clergy, he published a "Tractatus de Sacramentis", and a "Tractatus de Censuris". His somewhat original treatment of his subjects did not gain universal approval, but his works had a wide sale, especially in Germany and Austria.

He also contributed many articles to the "Linzer Quartalschrift".
