= Lienz District =

Lienz District Bezirk Lienz
- District
- Country: Austria
- State: Tyrol
- Number of municipalities: 33
- Administrative seat: Lienz

Government
  - District Governor: Bettina Heinricher

Area
  - Total: 2,016.41 km^{2} (778.54 sq mi)

Population (2019)
  - Total: 53,833
  - Density: 26.697/km^{2} (69.146/sq mi)
- Time zone: UTC+01:00 (CET)
  - Summer (DST): UTC+02:00 (CEST)
- Vehicle registration: LZ

The Bezirk Lienz (Italian: Distretto di Lienz) is an administrative district (Bezirk) in Tyrol, Austria. It is the only district in East Tyrol. The district borders the Pinzgau (Salzburg) in the north, the districts Spittal an der Drau and Hermagor (both Carinthia) in the east, Veneto (Italy) in the south, and South Tyrol (Italy) in the west.

The area of the district is 2,016.41 square kilometres (778.54 sq mi) with a population of 48,833 o January 1, 2019, and population a density of 25 per square kilometre (65/sq mi). The administrative center of the district is Lienz.

In 1918, it was occupied by the Italian Army. In 1919, Trentino and South Tyrol were split from what is now the Austrian state of Tyrol in the Treaty of Saint-Germain (these three entities made up the old Austro-Hungarian county of Tyrol). Since this time, East Tyrol has been separated from North Tyrol by about 5 kilometres (3.1 mi) of border between the federal state of Salzburg and South Tyrol. Accordingly, it forms an inner-Austrian exclave of the federal state of Tyrol. It was also the only part of modern Tyrol not occupied by France after the Second World War, instead forming part of the British zone.

== Geography ==
The district comprises parts of the Puster Valley, the valleys of Iseltal, Defereggen, Virgental, Kalser Tal, and the Tyrolean Gailtal. Mountain ranges in the district include parts of the Hohe Tauern with Venediger Group and Glockner Group, the Defereggen Alps, the Lienz Dolomits and the Karnisch Alps.

The shortest road connection to North Tyrol is the Felbertauern road (P1) and the Felbertauern tunnel (about 5.3 kilometres (3.3 mi)). Lienz is located at a road junction between the federal Felbertauern road (B108), a road to the Puster Valley (B100) and South Tyrol, and a road to the Drautal valley and Carinthia.

Historical population
| Year | Pop. | ±% |
|---|---|---|
| 1869 | 26,833 | — |
| 1880 | 27,422 | +2.2% |
| 1890 | 26,988 | −1.6% |
| 1900 | 26,895 | −0.3% |
| 1910 | 29,074 | +8.1% |
| 1923 | 28,591 | −1.7% |
| 1934 | 31,169 | +9.0% |
| 1939 | 33,445 | +7.3% |
| 1951 | 37,747 | +12.9% |
| 1961 | 41,123 | +8.9% |
| 1971 | 45,614 | +10.9% |
| 1981 | 47,494 | +4.1% |
| 1991 | 48,338 | +1.8% |
| 2001 | 50,404 | +4.3% |
Source: Statistik Austria

== Administrative divisions ==
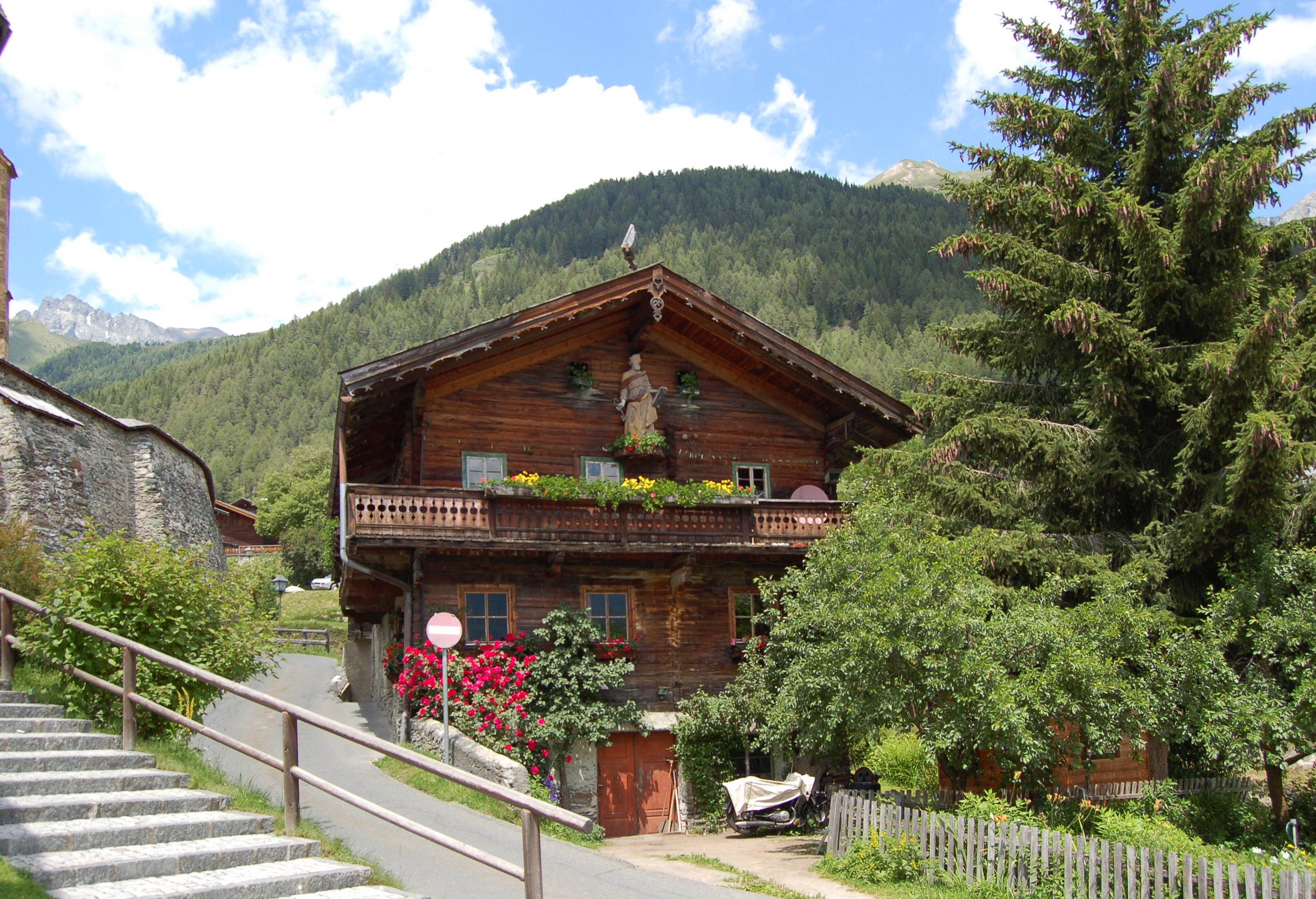
A farm in Lienz District

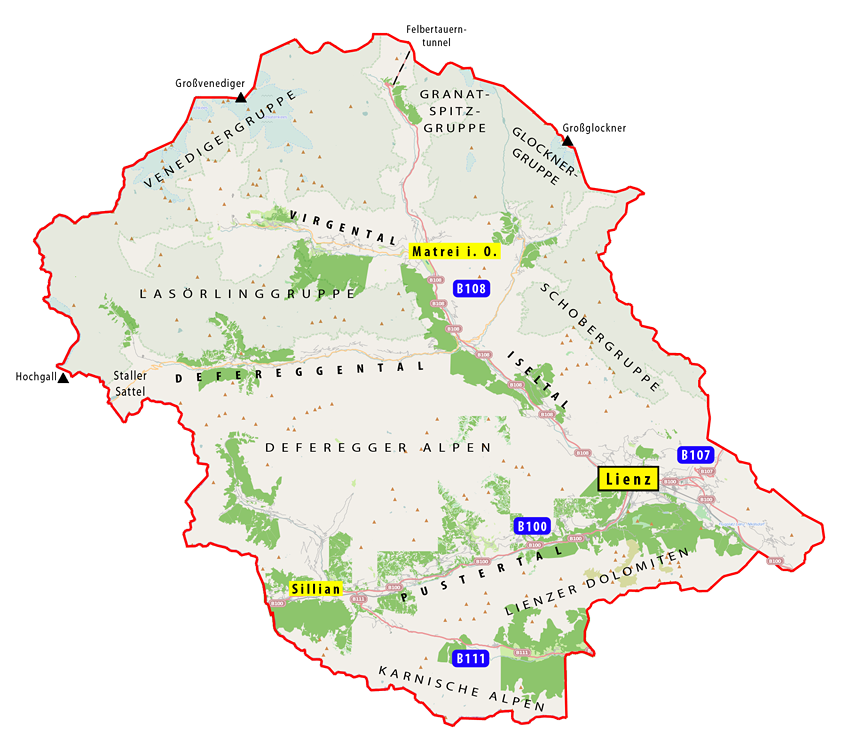
Mountain groups and alpine valleys in East Tyrol

The district is divided into 33 municipalities:

- Abfaltersbach (654)
- Ainet (925)
- Amlach (378)
- Anras (1,297)
- Assling (1,881)
- Außervillgraten (789)
- Dölsach (2,274)
- Gaimberg (835)
- Heinfels (1,007)
- Hopfgarten in Defereggen (765)
- Innervillgraten (974)
- Iselsberg-Stronach (617)
- Kals am Großglockner (1,231)
- Kartitsch (833)
- Lavant (298)
- Leisach (824)
- Lienz (11,816)
- Matrei in Osttirol (4,781)
- Nikolsdorf (910)
- Nußdorf-Debant (3,308)
- Oberlienz (1,411)
- Obertilliach (712)
- Prägraten am Großvenediger (1,225)
- Sankt Jakob in Defereggen (934)
- Sankt Johann im Walde (291)
- Sankt Veit in Defereggen (734)
- Schlaiten (470)
- Sillian (2,072)
- Strassen (827)
- Thurn (635)
- Tristach (1,410)
- Untertilliach (251)
- Virgen (2,199)
