= Schlaiten =

- Municipality
- Coat of arms

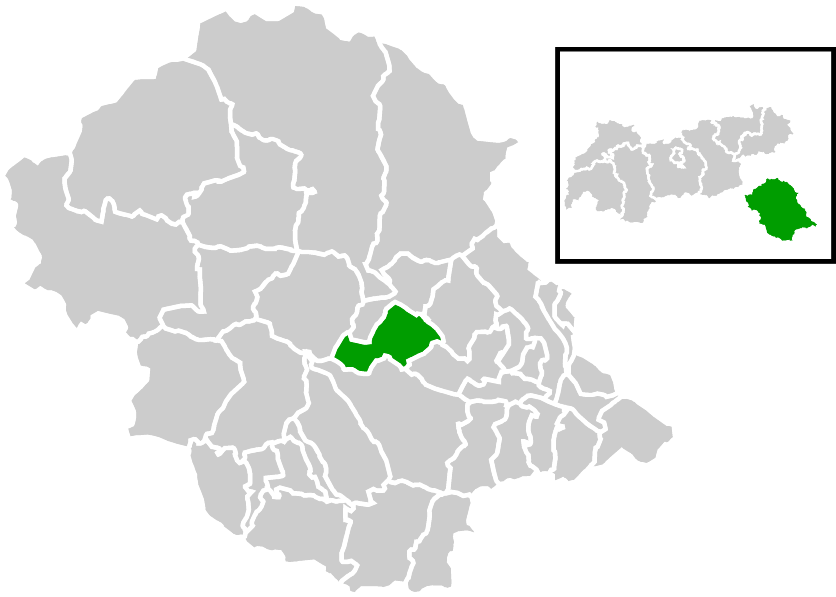
- Location within Lienz district

- Location within Austria
- Coordinates: 46°52′38″N 12°39′21″E
- Country: Austria
- State: Tyrol
- District: Lienz

Government
  - Mayor: Erich Gliber (HLS)

Area
  - Total: 36.64 km^{2} (14.15 sq mi)
- Elevation: 876 m (2,874 ft)

Population (2021)
  - Total: 453
  - Density: 12.4/km^{2} (32.0/sq mi)
- Time zone: UTC+1 (CET)
  - Summer (DST): UTC+2 (CEST)
- Postal code: 9954
- Area code: 4853
- Vehicle registration: LZ

Schlaiten is a municipality in the district of Lienz in the Austrian state of Tyrol. Its name is most likely of Slavonic origin, deriving from *slatina, which means swamp. The municipality consists of the following neighbourhoods: Plone, Gonzach, Mesnerdorf, Bacherdorf, Gantschach and Göriach.

== Population ==
Historical population
Year	Pop.	±%
1869	337	—
1880	339	+0.6%
1890	317	−6.5%
1900	289	−8.8%
1910	302	+4.5%
1923	293	−3.0%
1934	330	+12.6%
1939	323	−2.1%
1951	345	+6.8%
1961	431	+24.9%
1971	447	+3.7%
1981	453	+1.3%
1991	466	+2.9%
2001	498	+6.9%
2012	468	−6.0%
