= Innervillgraten =

- Municipality
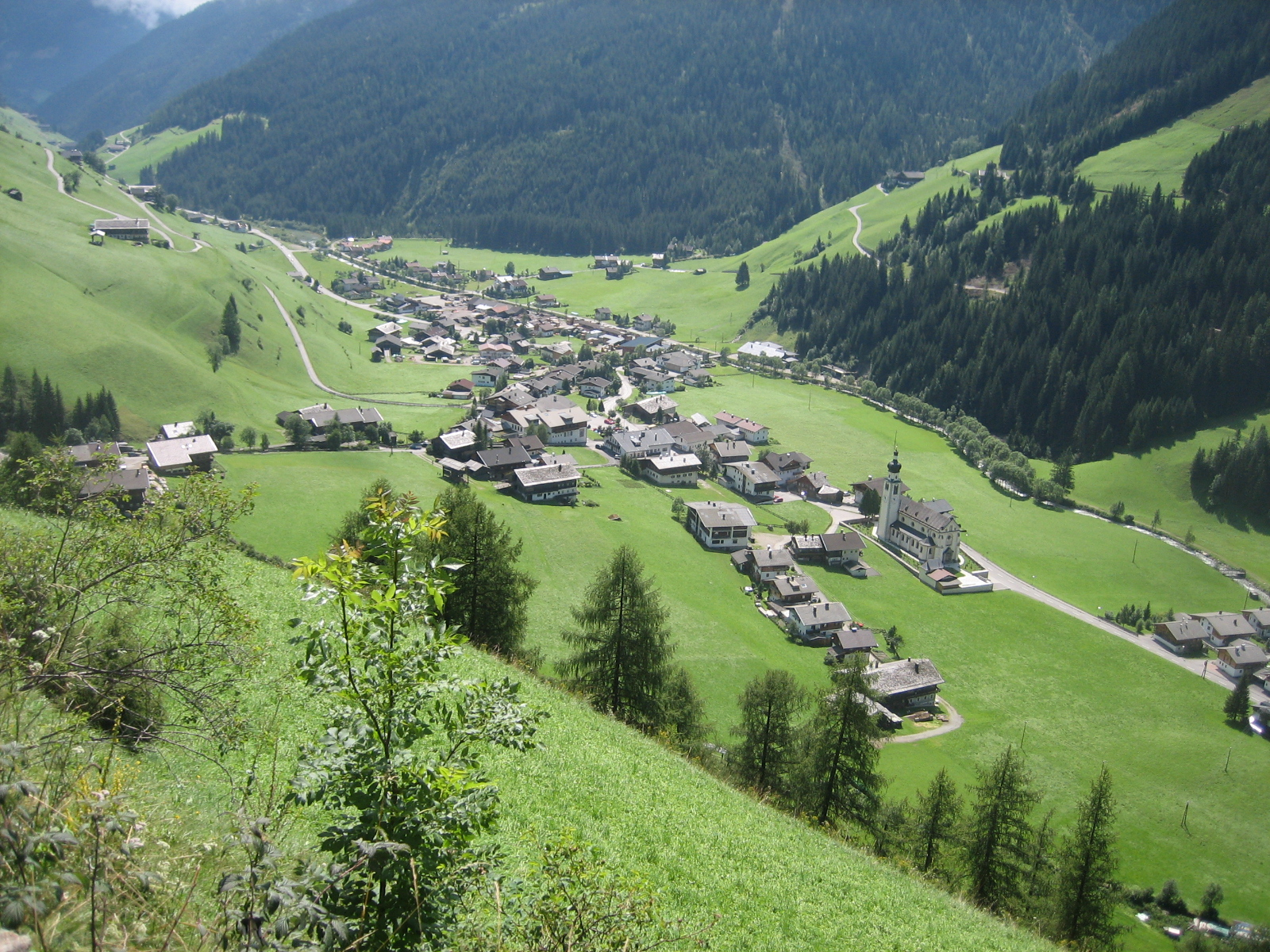
- Innervillgraten central village

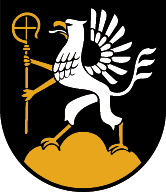
- Coat of arms

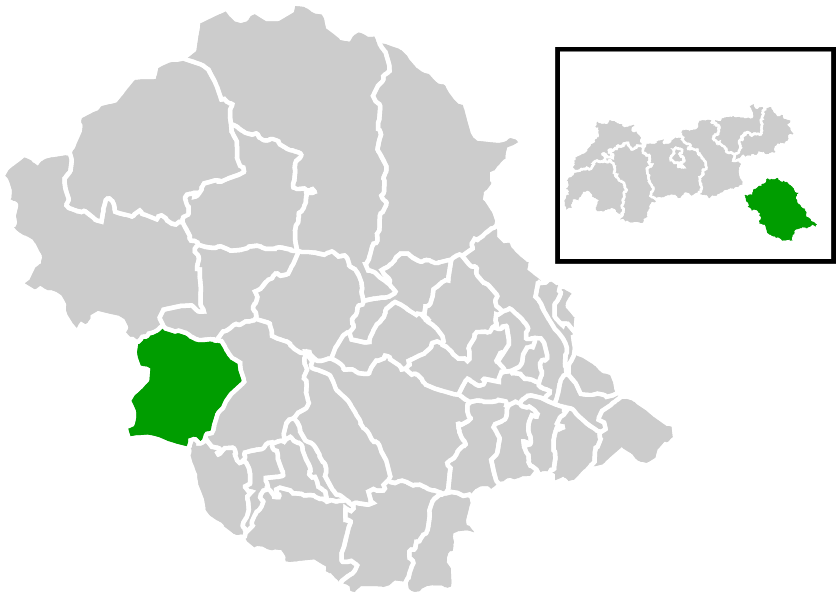
- Location within Lienz district

- Location within Austria Innervillgraten (Austria)
- Coordinates: 46°48′24″N 12°22′23″E
- Country: Austria
- State: Tyrol
- District: Lienz

Government
  - Mayor: Andreas Schett

Area
  - Total: 87.83 km^{2} (33.91 sq mi)
- Elevation: 1,402 m (4,600 ft)

Population (2018-01-01)
  - Total: 938
  - Density: 10.7/km^{2} (27.7/sq mi)
- Time zone: UTC+1 (CET)
  - Summer (DST): UTC+2 (CEST)
- Postal code: 9932
- Area code: 04843
- Vehicle registration: LZ
- Website: www.innervillgraten.at

Innervillgraten is a municipality in the district of Lienz in the Austrian state of Tyrol. The region is one of the most remote regions in Austria. A year-long connection to the valley was established as late as 1956. The death of Pius Walder, a wood cutter and poacher, who had been shot by Johann Schett, led to some tourist and media interest.

== Population ==
Historical population
Year	Pop.	±%
1869	858	—
1880	815	−5.0%
1890	806	−1.1%
1900	743	−7.8%
1910	754	+1.5%
1923	705	−6.5%
1934	817	+15.9%
1939	829	+1.5%
1951	859	+3.6%
1961	934	+8.7%
1971	1,019	+9.1%
1981	1,042	+2.3%
1991	973	−6.6%
2001	984	+1.1%
2011	974	−1.0%
