= Sankt Johann im Walde =

St. Johann im Walde
- Municipality
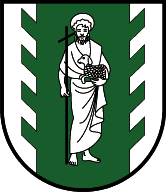
- Coat of arms

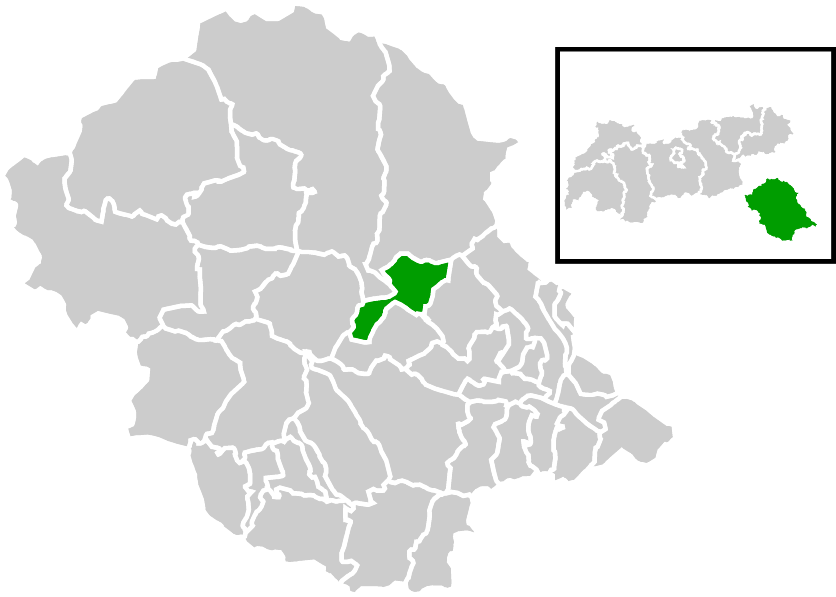
- Location within Lienz district

- Location within Austria
- Coordinates: 46°54′15″N 12°37′47″E
- Country: Austria
- State: Tyrol
- District: Lienz

Government
  - Mayor: Josef Rainer

Area
  - Total: 32.82 km^{2} (12.67 sq mi)
- Elevation: 748 m (2,454 ft)

Population (2021)
  - Total: 297
  - Density: 9.05/km^{2} (23.4/sq mi)
- Time zone: UTC+1 (CET)
  - Summer (DST): UTC+2 (CEST)
- Postal code: 9951
- Area code: 04872
- Vehicle registration: LZ
- Website: www.st-johann-im-walde.at

Sankt Johann im Walde is a municipality in the district of Lienz in the Austrian state of Tyrol.

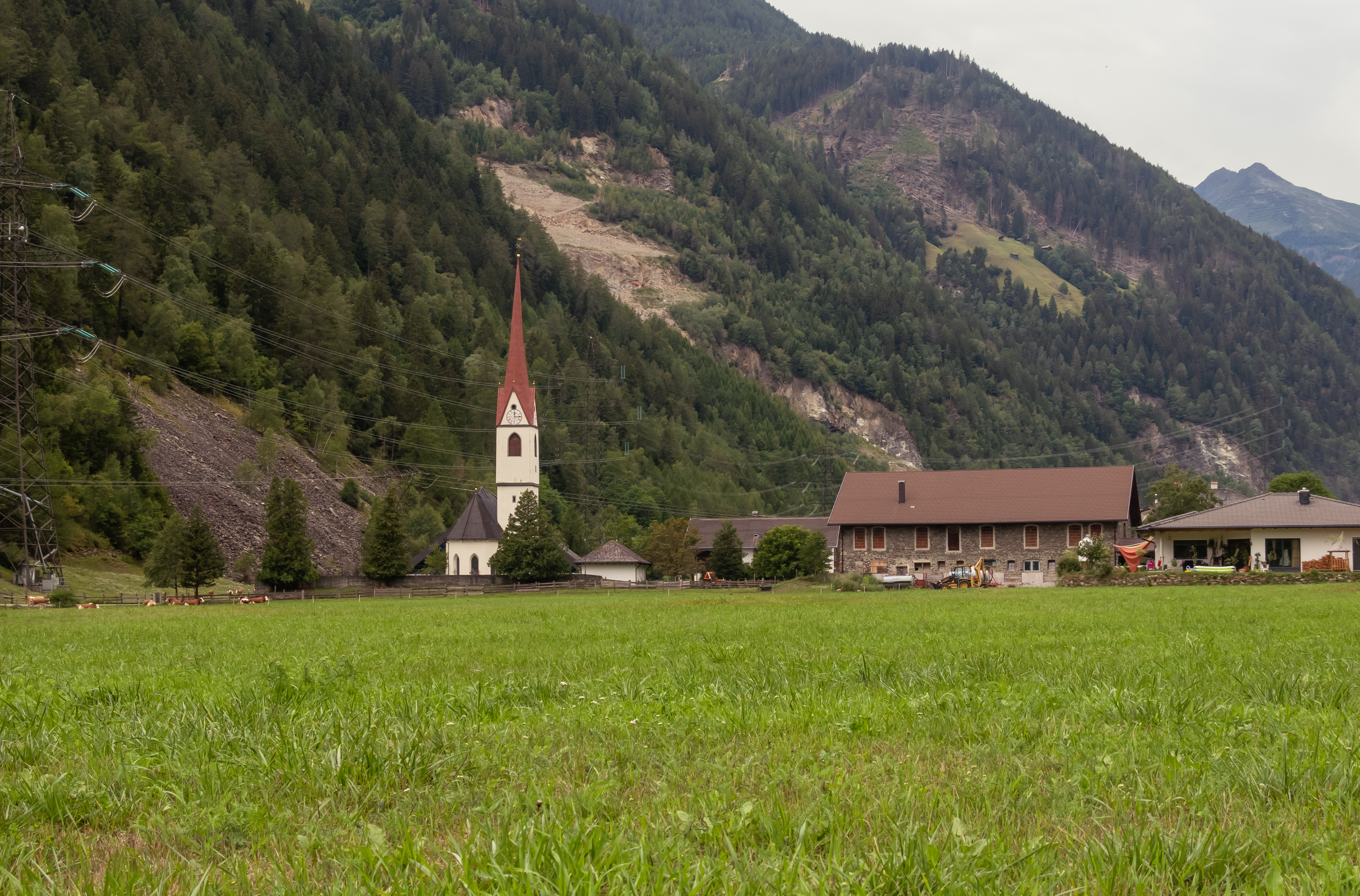
Sankt Johann im Walde, view to the village with church (katholische Pfarrkirche Sankt Johannes der Täufer)

== Population ==
Historical population
Year	Pop.	±%
1869	260	—
1880	273	+5.0%
1890	261	−4.4%
1900	255	−2.3%
1910	276	+8.2%
1923	307	+11.2%
1934	265	−13.7%
1939	319	+20.4%
1951	289	−9.4%
1961	329	+13.8%
1971	356	+8.2%
1981	314	−11.8%
1991	305	−2.9%
2001	298	−2.3%
2012	291	−2.3%
