= Ainet =

- Municipality
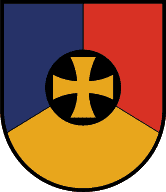
- Coat of arms

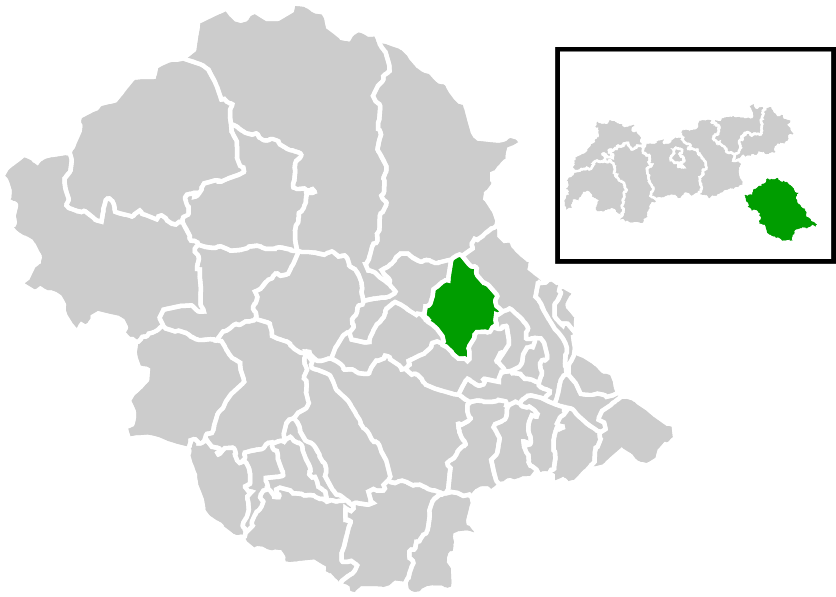
- Location within Lienz district

- Location within Austria
- Coordinates: 46°51′00″N 12°41′00″E
- Country: Austria
- State: Tyrol
- District: Lienz

Government
  - Mayor: Berta Staller

Area
  - Total: 40.43 km^{2} (15.61 sq mi)
- Elevation: 747 m (2,451 ft)

Population (2021)
  - Total: 921
  - Density: 22.8/km^{2} (59.0/sq mi)
- Time zone: UTC+1 (CET)
  - Summer (DST): UTC+2 (CEST)
- Postal code: 9951
- Area code: 04853
- Vehicle registration: LZ
- Website: www.ainet.gv.at

Ainet is a municipality in the district of Lienz in the Austrian state of Tyrol.

== Population ==
Historical population
Year	Pop.	±%
1869	536	—
1880	553	+3.2%
1890	493	−10.8%
1900	486	−1.4%
1910	561	+15.4%
1923	537	−4.3%
1934	605	+12.7%
1939	592	−2.1%
1951	700	+18.2%
1961	783	+11.9%
1971	918	+17.2%
1981	953	+3.8%
1991	1,007	+5.7%
2001	1,018	+1.1%
2011	925	−9.1%

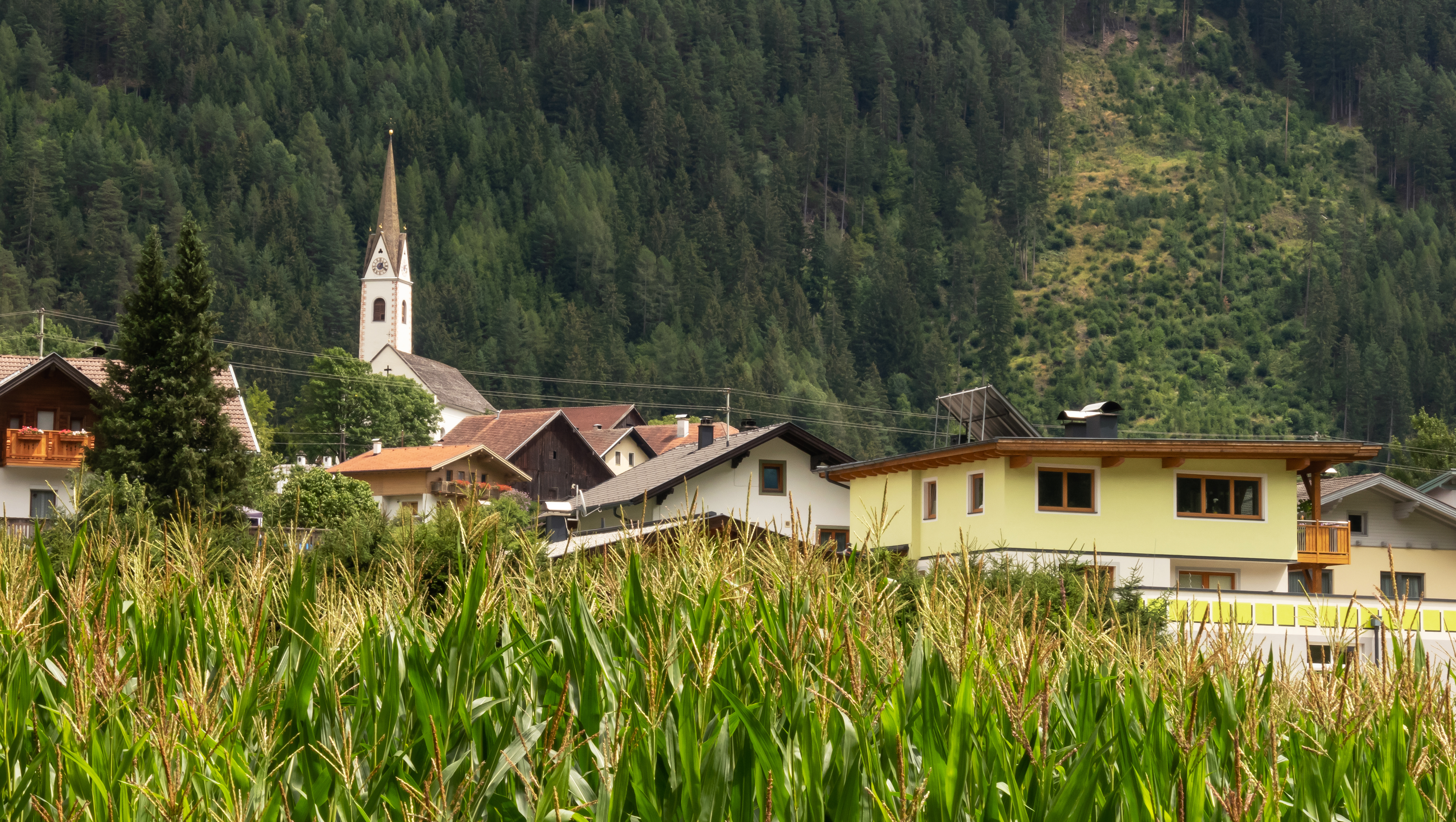
Ainet, church; the katholische Pfarrkirche Sankt Ulrich und Markus
