= Anras =

- Municipality
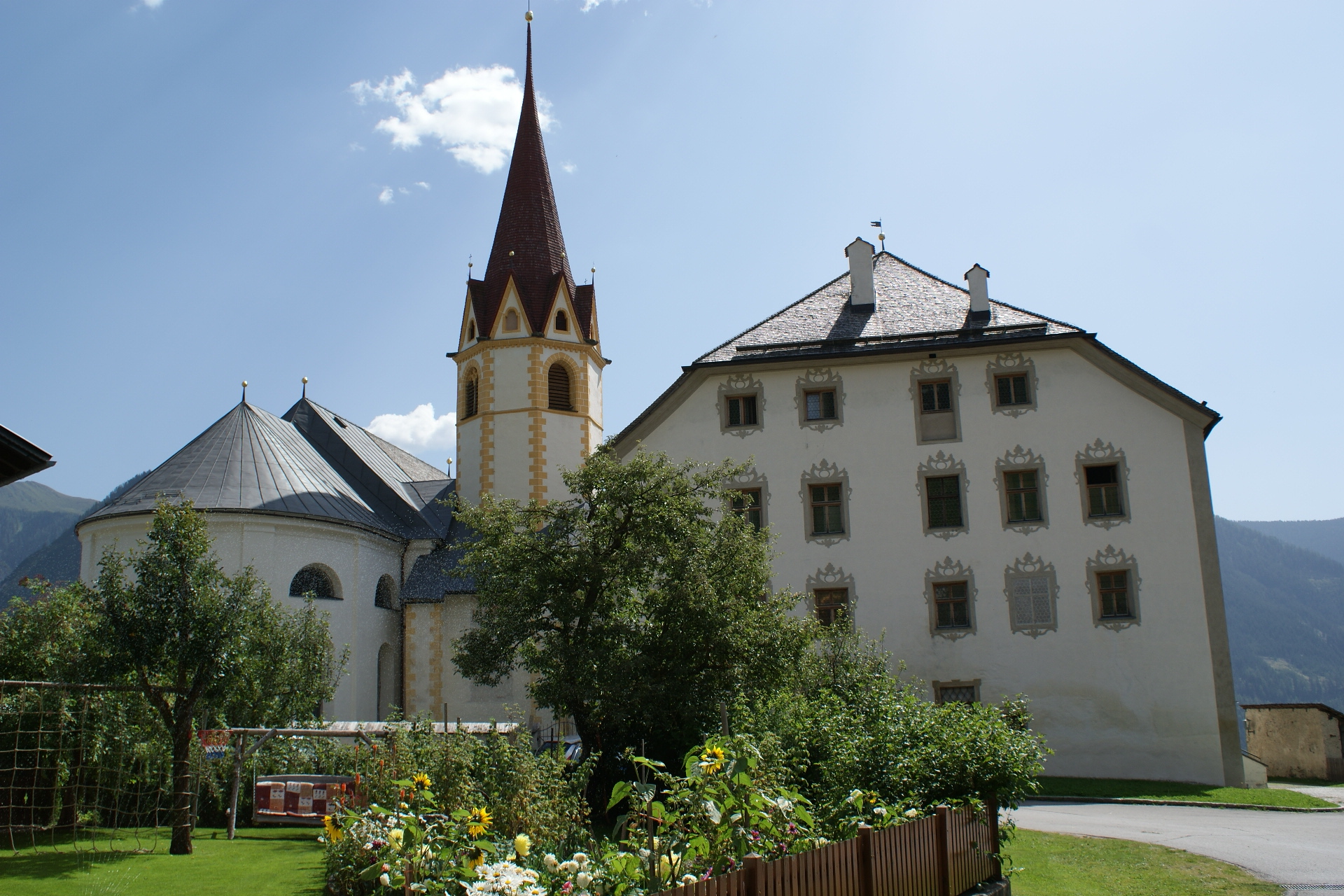
- Anras Castle with St Stephen's Church

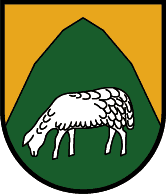
- Coat of arms

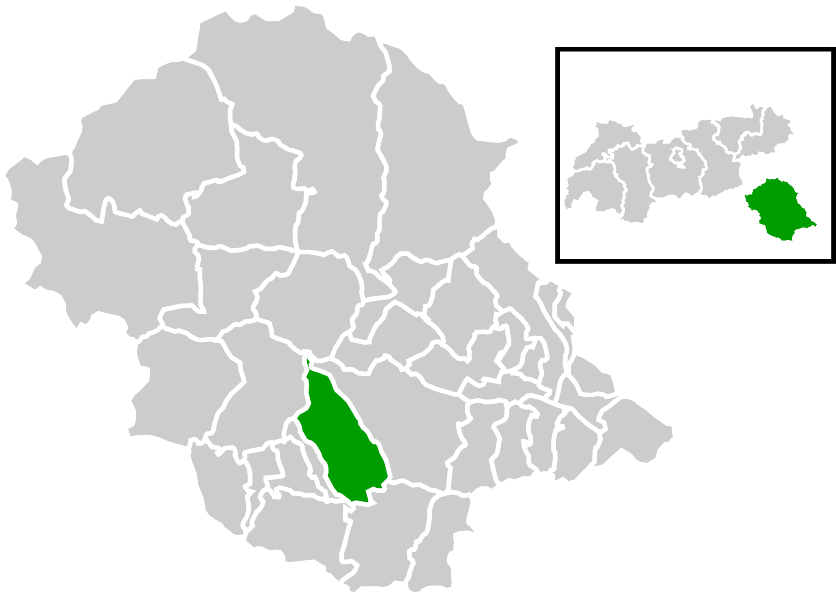
- Location within Lienz district

- Location within Austria
- Coordinates: 46°46′26″N 12°33′39″E
- Country: Austria
- State: Tyrol
- District: Lienz

Government
  - Mayor: Johann Waldauf

Area
  - Total: 62.07 km^{2} (23.97 sq mi)
- Elevation: 1,261 m (4,137 ft)

Population (2021)
  - Total: 1,229
  - Density: 19.80/km^{2} (51.28/sq mi)
- Time zone: UTC+1 (CET)
  - Summer (DST): UTC+2 (CEST)
- Postal code: 9912
- Area code: 04846
- Vehicle registration: LZ
- Website: www.anras.at

Anras is a municipality in the district of Lienz in the Austrian state of Tyrol.

== Geography ==
The settlement is situated in the East Tyrolean part of the Puster Valley, stretching along the upper Drava river between the Villgraten Mountains (Defereggen) in the north to the foothills of the Lienz Dolomites, the westernmost peaks of the Gailtal Alps. The farmsteads lie mostly on the sunny terraces or on the valley floor north of the Drava.

The municipal area comprises the cadastral communities of Anras proper, Asch-Winkl, and Ried.

== History ==
From about 1200, Anras Castle was built as a summer residence of the Bishops of Brixen. In 1236, Emperor Frederick II granted them the surrounding Puster Valley estates up to the Lienz suburbs where they bordered the lands of the rivaling Counts of Gorizia.

In 1754, the castle was rebuilt in a Baroque style and served as the seat of the local administration. The territories were held by the Brixen prince-bishops until the secularisation of 1803. Today, the fertile soils of Anras are known as the East Tyrolean breadbasket.
