= Sillian =

- Municipality
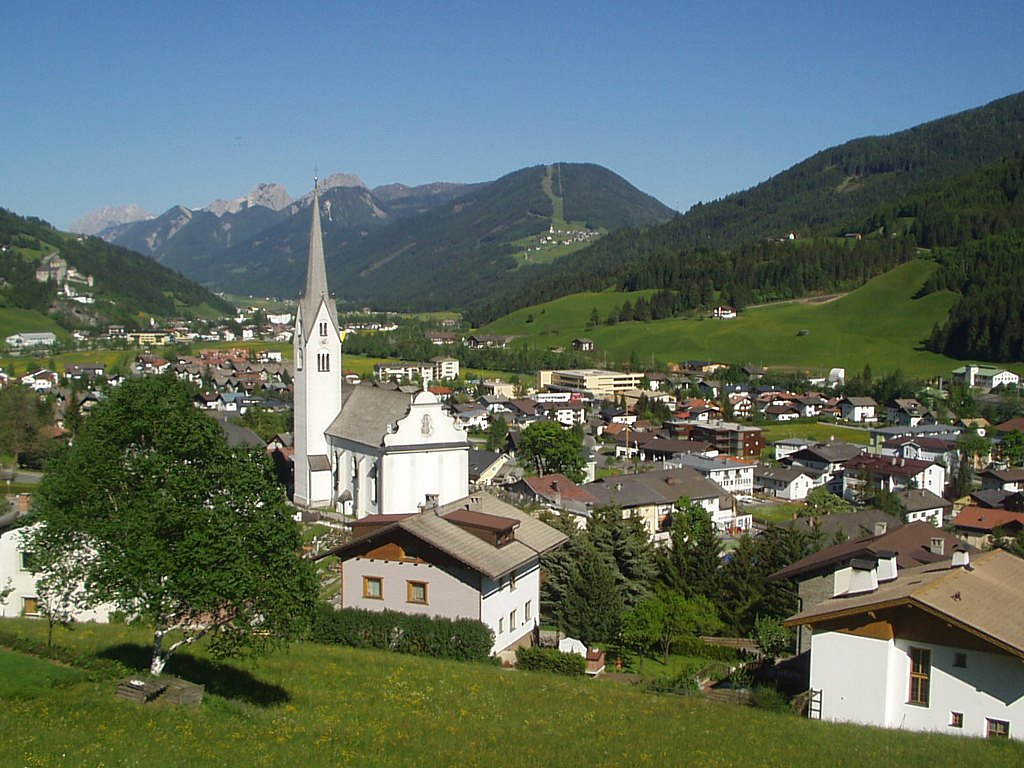

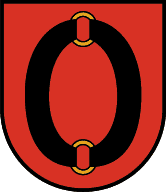
- Coat of arms

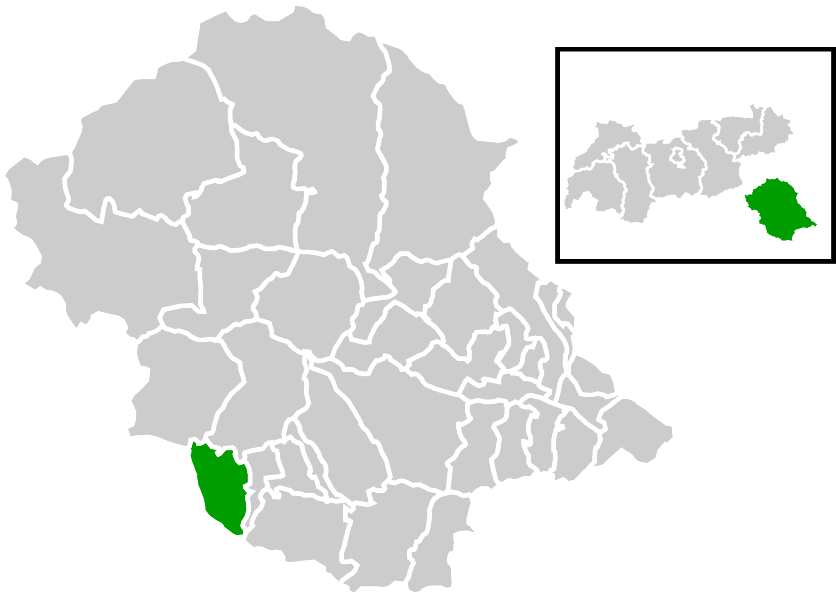
- Location within Lienz district

- Location within Austria Sillian (Austria)
- Coordinates: 46°45′10″N 12°25′16″E
- Country: Austria
- State: Tyrol
- District: Lienz

Government
  - Mayor: Franz Schneider (ÖVP)

Area
  - Total: 36.26 km^{2} (14.00 sq mi)
- Elevation: 1,103 m (3,619 ft)

Population (2021)
  - Total: 2,030
  - Density: 56.0/km^{2} (145/sq mi)
- Time zone: UTC+1 (CET)
  - Summer (DST): UTC+2 (CEST)
- Postal code: 9920
- Area code: 04842
- Vehicle registration: LZ
- Website: www.marktgemeinde-sillian.at

Sillian is a market town in the district of Lienz, in the Austrian state of Tyrol.

== Geography ==
The municipality, at a height of about 1,100 m (3,600 ft), is the main settlement in the East Tyrolean Hochpustertal, the eastern part of the Puster Valley, stretching from Lienz up to the border with South Tyrol, Italy, in the west. The settlement is situated north of the upper Drava river, on the sunny slopes of the Villgraten Mountains. In the south, the valley stretches to the Lienz Dolomites and the Carnic Alps.

== Climate ==
The weather in Sillian is extremely changeable due to its location, and it can quickly change from warm and balmy to sub-zero.

Climate data for Sillian (1971–2000)
| Month | Jan | Feb | Mar | Apr | May | Jun | Jul | Aug | Sep | Oct | Nov | Dec | Year |
|---|---|---|---|---|---|---|---|---|---|---|---|---|---|
| Record high °C (°F) | 11.5 (52.7) | 17.0 (62.6) | 21.0 (69.8) | 23.0 (73.4) | 27.8 (82.0) | 30.0 (86.0) | 33.5 (92.3) | 31.0 (87.8) | 29.0 (84.2) | 25.4 (77.7) | 17.4 (63.3) | 13.0 (55.4) | 33.5 (92.3) |
| Mean daily maximum °C (°F) | 0.7 (33.3) | 3.4 (38.1) | 7.8 (46.0) | 11.6 (52.9) | 16.7 (62.1) | 19.8 (67.6) | 22.5 (72.5) | 22.8 (73.0) | 18.1 (64.6) | 12.7 (54.9) | 5.7 (42.3) | 0.8 (33.4) | 11.8 (53.2) |
| Daily mean °C (°F) | −4.8 (23.4) | −3.0 (26.6) | 1.0 (33.8) | 4.9 (40.8) | 10.0 (50.0) | 13.2 (55.8) | 15.6 (60.1) | 14.8 (58.6) | 11.0 (51.8) | 5.8 (42.4) | −0.1 (31.8) | −4.3 (24.3) | 5.3 (41.5) |
| Mean daily minimum °C (°F) | −8.7 (16.3) | −7.4 (18.7) | −3.7 (25.3) | −0.3 (31.5) | 4.2 (39.6) | 7.4 (45.3) | 9.6 (49.3) | 9.3 (48.7) | 5.8 (42.4) | 1.3 (34.3) | −3.8 (25.2) | −7.8 (18.0) | 0.5 (32.9) |
| Record low °C (°F) | −26.0 (−14.8) | −21.0 (−5.8) | −23.5 (−10.3) | −11.0 (12.2) | −14.0 (6.8) | −1.5 (29.3) | 1.5 (34.7) | 0.0 (32.0) | −5.2 (22.6) | −10.2 (13.6) | −22.0 (−7.6) | −20.0 (−4.0) | −26.0 (−14.8) |
| Average precipitation mm (inches) | 42.3 (1.67) | 37.9 (1.49) | 58.3 (2.30) | 68.5 (2.70) | 95.2 (3.75) | 116.0 (4.57) | 130.6 (5.14) | 105.9 (4.17) | 90.2 (3.55) | 91.2 (3.59) | 66.1 (2.60) | 48.2 (1.90) | 950.3 (37.41) |
| Average snowfall cm (inches) | 30.6 (12.0) | 39.5 (15.6) | 28.5 (11.2) | 14.8 (5.8) | 1.3 (0.5) | 0.0 (0.0) | 0.0 (0.0) | 0.0 (0.0) | 0.0 (0.0) | 3.4 (1.3) | 29.3 (11.5) | 32.8 (12.9) | 180.2 (70.9) |
| Average precipitation days (≥ 1.0 mm) | 5.6 | 5.1 | 6.4 | 8.3 | 11.9 | 13.6 | 12.8 | 12.0 | 8.5 | 7.5 | 6.6 | 6.1 | 104.4 |
| Average relative humidity (%) (at 14:00) | 64.4 | 50.1 | 43.6 | 41.2 | 44.2 | 46.0 | 44.8 | 48.0 | 49.1 | 54.2 | 59.5 | 71.8 | 51.4 |
Source: Central Institute for Meteorology and Geodynamics

== History ==
The area belonged to the estates granted by Duke Tassilo III of Bavaria to Innichen Abbey in 769. First mentioned about 1000, the estates of Silano were held by the Meinhardiner counts of Gorizia from the 13th century onwards. The parish church was consecrated in 1326. Count Leonhard of Gorizia vested the citizens with market privileges in 1469. Upon the extinction of the line in 1500, Sillian was seized by the House of Habsburg king Maximilian I and incorporated into the County of Tyrol.

Up to World War I, Sillian was a garrison town of the Austro-Hungarian Army. By the 1919 Treaty of Saint Germain, it became a border town close to the South Tyrolean lands of the Italian kingdom.

=== Population ===
Historical population
| Year | Pop. | ±% |
|---|---|---|
| 1869 | 1,417 | — |
| 1880 | 1,258 | −11.2% |
| 1890 | 1,202 | −4.5% |
| 1900 | 1,224 | +1.8% |
| 1910 | 1,240 | +1.3% |
| 1923 | 1,249 | +0.7% |
| 1934 | 1,396 | +11.8% |
| 1939 | 1,425 | +2.1% |
| 1951 | 1,671 | +17.3% |
| 1961 | 1,948 | +16.6% |
| 1971 | 1,988 | +2.1% |
| 1981 | 2,004 | +0.8% |
| 1991 | 1,997 | −0.3% |
| 2001 | 2,082 | +4.3% |
| 2011 | 2,073 | −0.4% |

== Notable people ==
Young Richard Strauss from 1872 onwards spent several summers at Sillian; he is purported to have played the church organ as well as the hotel piano of the Schwarzer Adler (Black Eagle) inn, and even to have composed here.

== Economy ==
Sillian's economy mainly relies on wood processing and tourism. There are 1200 guest beds of all categories available.
