= Assling =

- Municipality
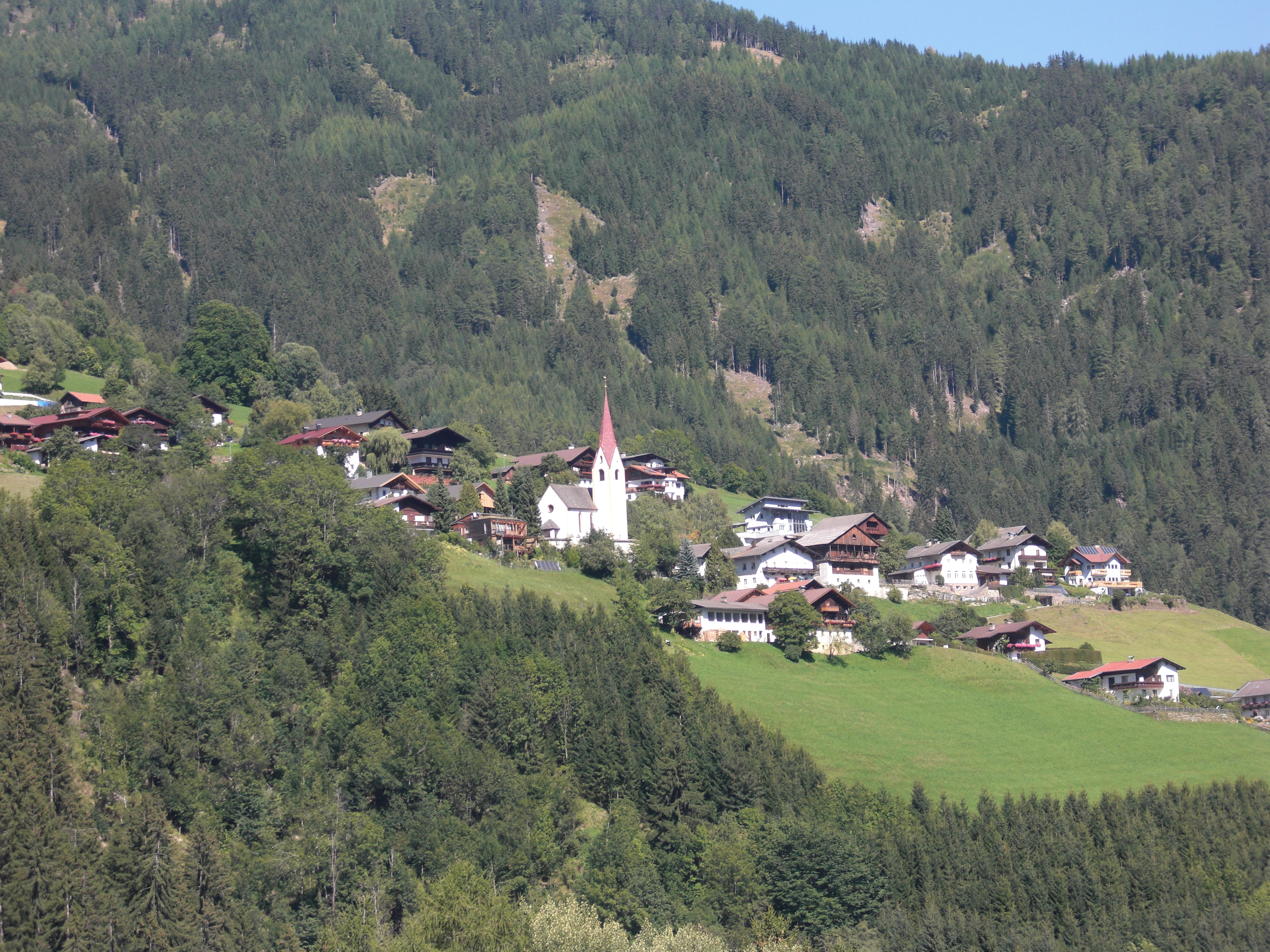
- Bannberg borough of Assling

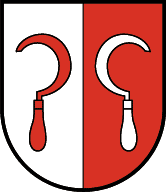
- Coat of arms

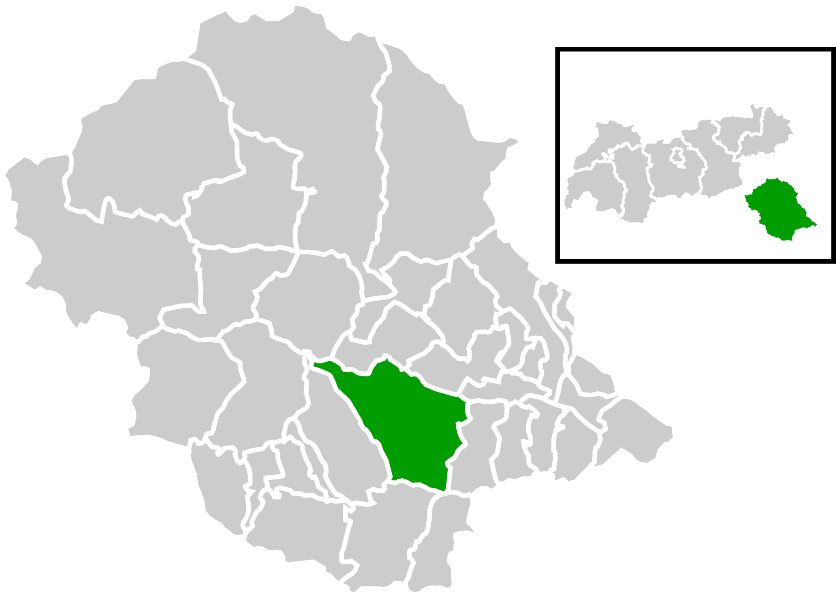
- Location within Lienz district

- Location within Austria
- Coordinates: 46°47′11″N 12°38′28″E
- Country: Austria
- State: Tyrol
- District: Lienz

Government
  - Mayor: Reinhard Mair

Area
  - Total: 98.97 km^{2} (38.21 sq mi)
- Elevation: 1,128 m (3,701 ft)

Population (2021)
  - Total: 1,786
  - Density: 18.05/km^{2} (46.74/sq mi)
- Time zone: UTC+1 (CET)
  - Summer (DST): UTC+2 (CEST)
- Postal code: 9911
- Area code: 04855
- Vehicle registration: LZ
- Website: www.assling.at

Assling is a municipality in the district of Lienz in the Austrian state of Tyrol.

== Population ==
Historical population
Year	Pop.	±%
1869	1,493	—
1880	1,501	+0.5%
1890	1,543	+2.8%
1900	1,531	−0.8%
1910	1,567	+2.4%
1923	1,551	−1.0%
1934	1,694	+9.2%
1939	1,748	+3.2%
1951	1,876	+7.3%
1961	1,970	+5.0%
1971	2,166	+9.9%
1981	2,192	+1.2%
1991	2,085	−4.9%
2001	2,084	−0.0%
