= Außervillgraten =

- Municipality
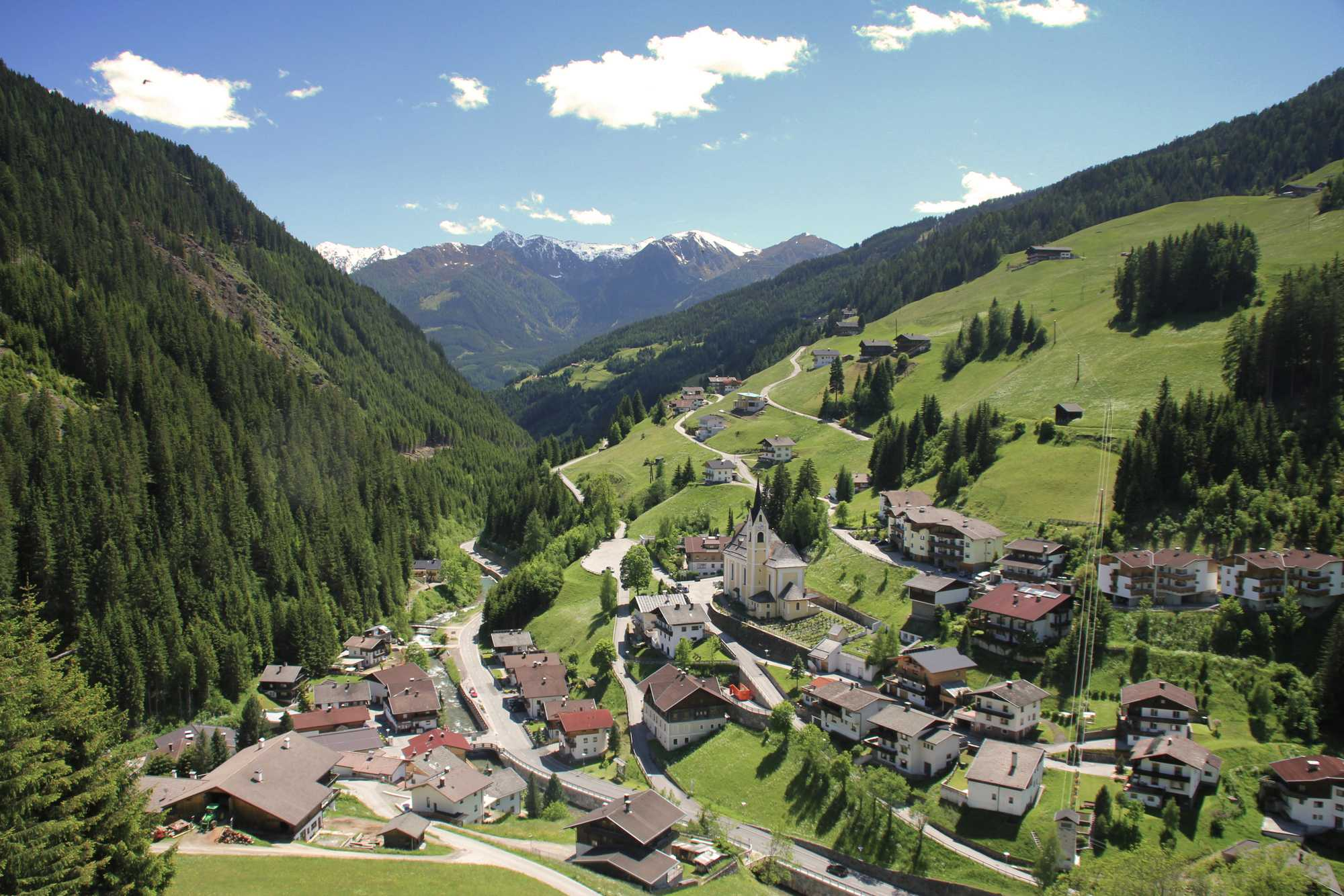

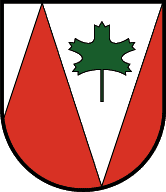
- Coat of arms

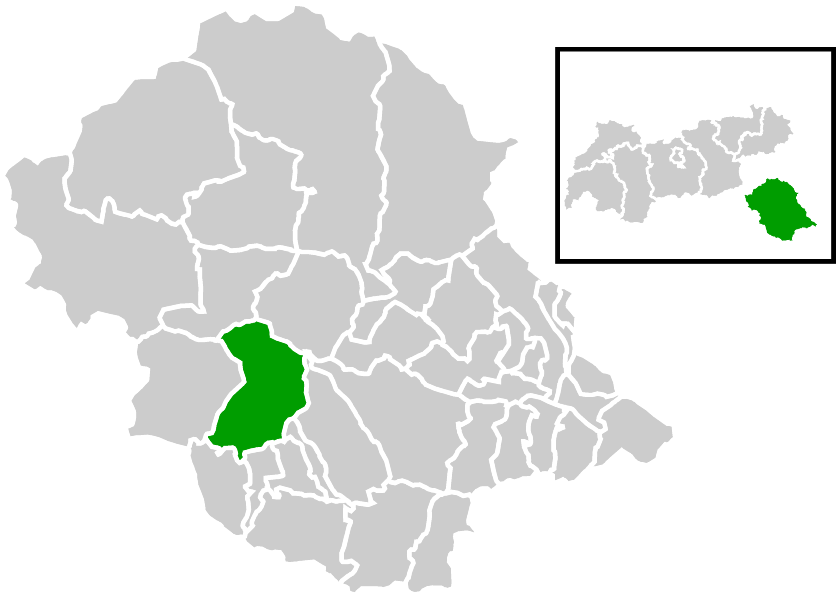
- Location within Lienz district

- Location within Austria
- Coordinates: 46°47′12″N 12°25′43″E
- Country: Austria
- State: Tyrol
- District: Lienz

Government
  - Mayor: Josef Mair

Area
  - Municipality: 79.1 km^{2} (30.5 sq mi)
  - Metro: 79.04 km^{2} (30.52 sq mi)
- Elevation: 1,287 m (4,222 ft)

Population (2021)
  - Municipality: 746
  - Density: 9.43/km^{2} (24.4/sq mi)
- Time zone: UTC+1 (CET)
  - Summer (DST): UTC+2 (CEST)
- Postal code: 9931
- Area code: 04843
- Vehicle registration: LZ
- Website: www.ausservillgraten.gv.at

Außervillgraten is a municipality in the district of Lienz in the Austrian state of Tyrol, Ski resort, hosted stages of the Alpine Skiing Europa Cup.

== Population ==
Historical population
Year	Pop.	±%
1869	842	—
1880	822	−2.4%
1890	766	−6.8%
1900	727	−5.1%
1910	772	+6.2%
1923	753	−2.5%
1934	791	+5.0%
1939	802	+1.4%
1951	870	+8.5%
1961	1,030	+18.4%
1971	1,152	+11.8%
1981	1,171	+1.6%
1991	1,026	−12.4%
2001	977	−4.8%
2011	789	−19.2%
