= Nußdorf-Debant =

- Municipality
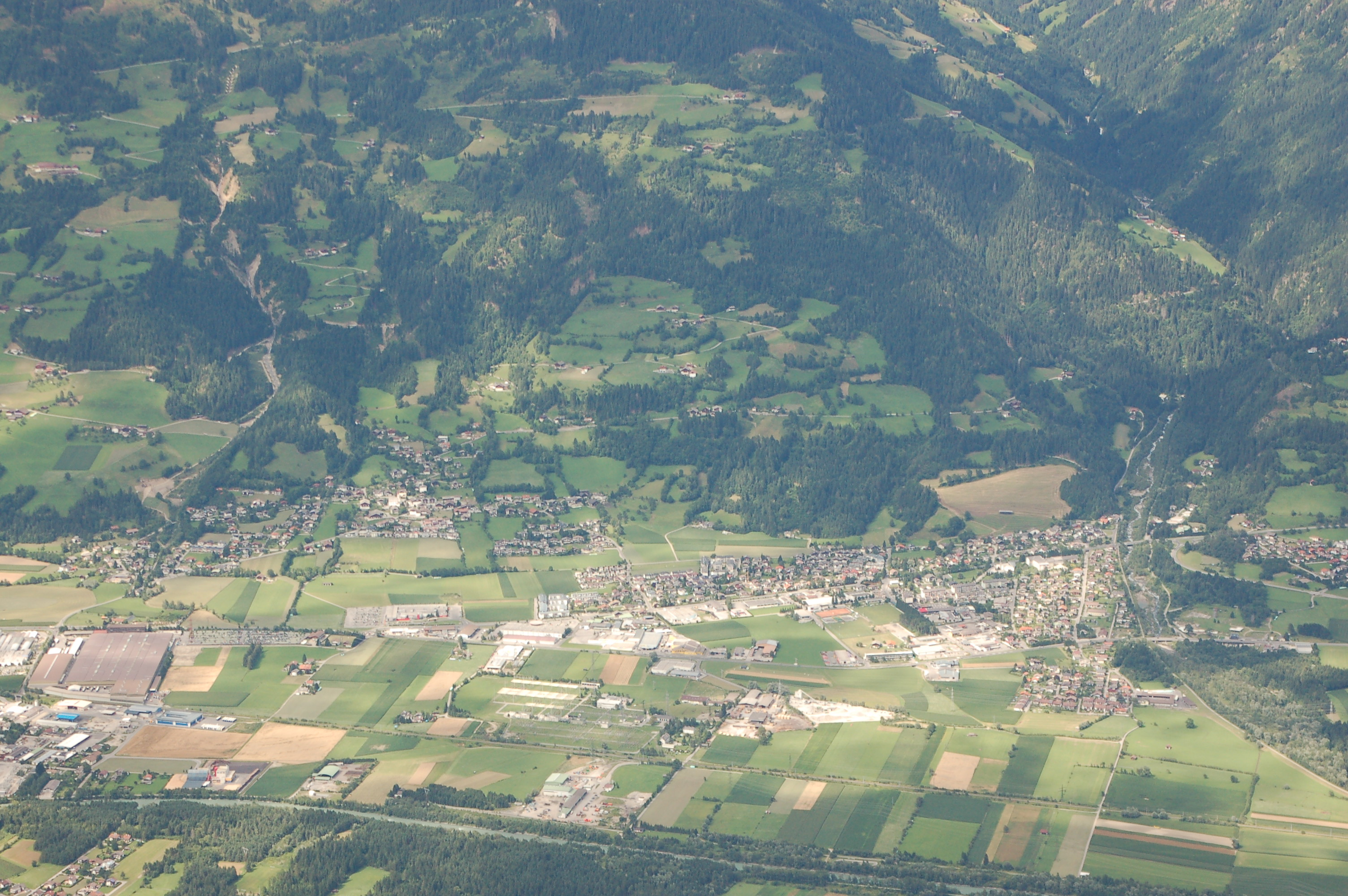
- Nußdorf-Debant

- Coat of arms

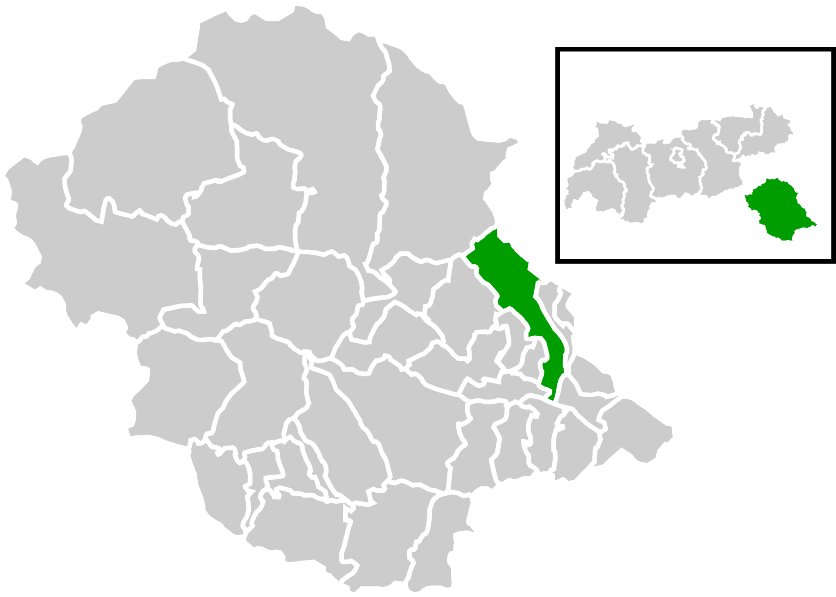
- Location within Lienz district

- Location within Austria
- Coordinates: 46°49′59″N 12°49′06″E
- Country: Austria
- State: Tyrol
- District: Lienz

Government
  - Mayor: Andreas Pfurner

Area
  - Total: 53.44 km^{2} (20.63 sq mi)
- Elevation: 713 m (2,339 ft)

Population (2018-01-01)
  - Total: 3,325
  - Density: 62.22/km^{2} (161.1/sq mi)
- Time zone: UTC+1 (CET)
  - Summer (DST): UTC+2 (CEST)
- Postal code: 9990
- Area code: 4852
- Vehicle registration: LZ
- Website: www.nussdorf-debant.at

Nußdorf-Debant (German pronunciation: [ˈnʊsdɔʁf ˈdeːbant]) is a municipality in the district of Lienz in the Austrian state of Tyrol.

== Population ==
Historical population
Year	Pop.	±%
1869	559	—
1880	585	+4.7%
1890	576	−1.5%
1900	586	+1.7%
1910	606	+3.4%
1923	605	−0.2%
1934	655	+8.3%
1939	682	+4.1%
1951	842	+23.5%
1961	1,127	+33.8%
1971	1,715	+52.2%
1981	2,216	+29.2%
1991	2,794	+26.1%
2001	3,097	+10.8%
2011	3,227	+4.2%
