= Thurn, Austria =

Thurn
- Municipality
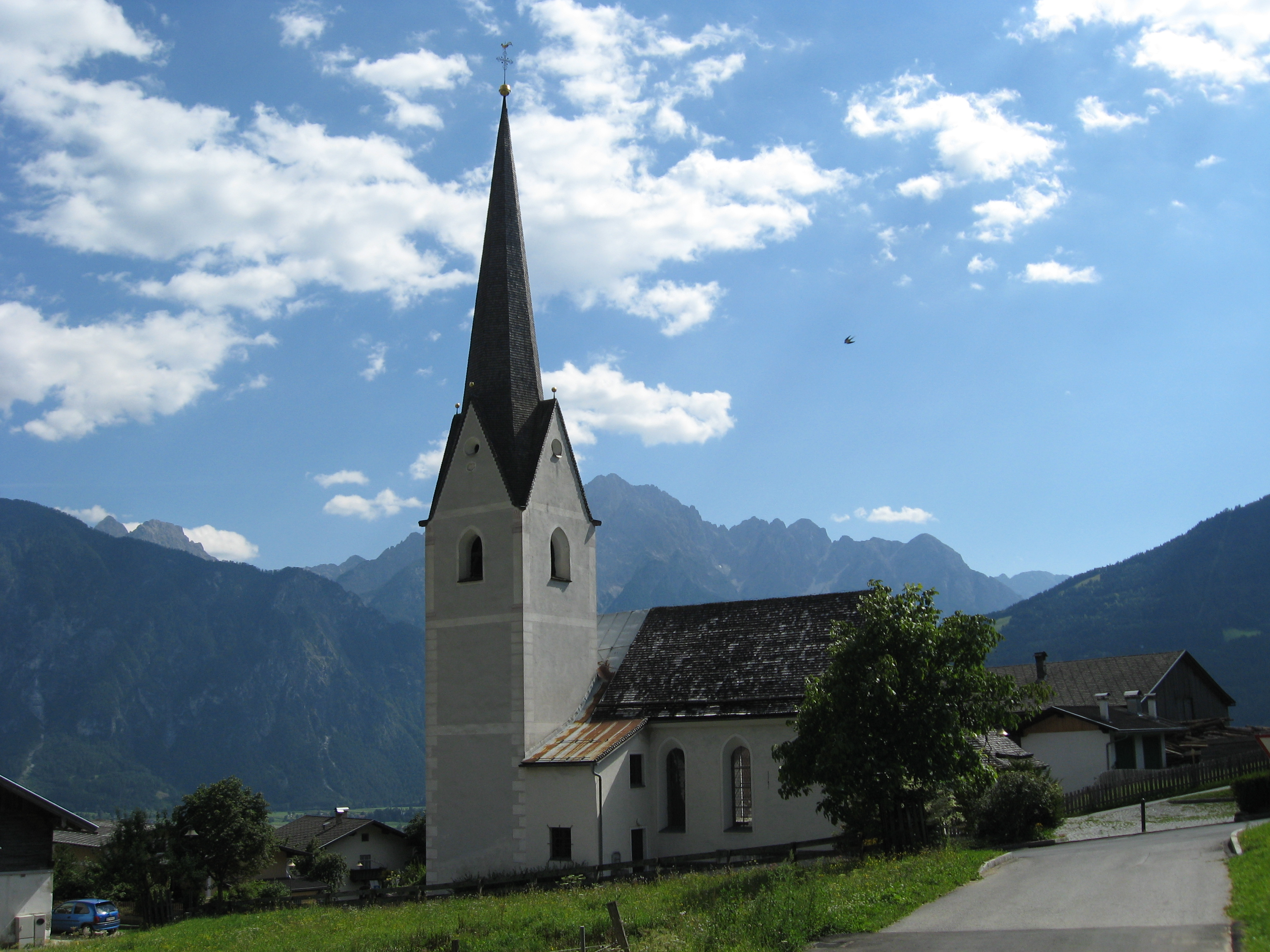

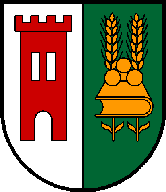
- Coat of arms

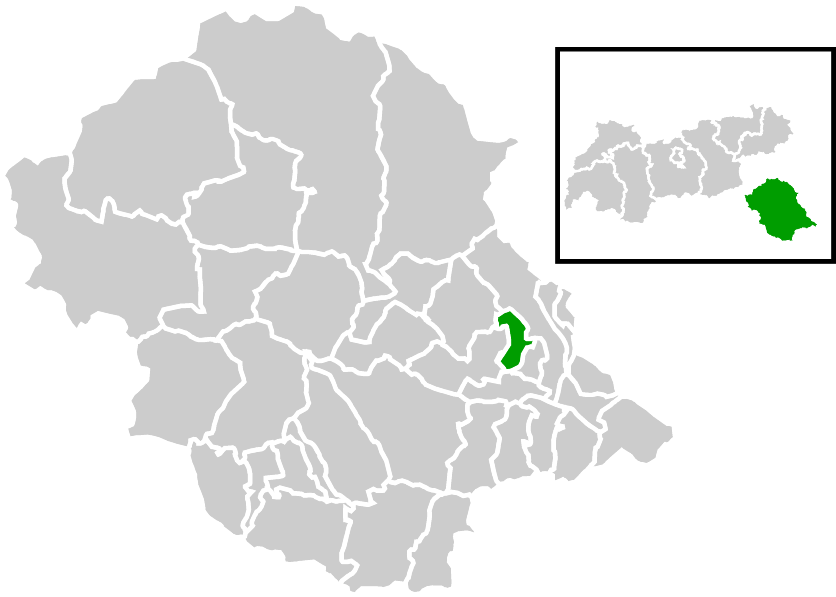
- Location within Lienz district

- Location within Austria
- Coordinates: 46°50′59″N 12°45′36″E
- Country: Austria
- State: Tyrol
- District: Lienz

Government
  - Mayor: Reinhold Kollnig (ÖVP)

Area
  - Total: 12.27 km^{2} (4.74 sq mi)
- Elevation: 855 m (2,805 ft)

Population (2018-01-01)
  - Total: 608
  - Density: 49.6/km^{2} (128/sq mi)
- Time zone: UTC+1 (CET)
  - Summer (DST): UTC+2 (CEST)
- Postal code: 9900
- Area code: 04852
- Vehicle registration: LZ
- Website: www.thurn.eu

Thurn is a municipality in the district of Lienz in the Austrian state of Tyrol.

== Population ==
Historical population
Year	Pop.	±%
1869	339	—
1880	311	−8.3%
1890	322	+3.5%
1900	294	−8.7%
1910	269	−8.5%
1923	243	−9.7%
1934	258	+6.2%
1939	281	+8.9%
1951	304	+8.2%
1961	367	+20.7%
1971	446	+21.5%
1981	494	+10.8%
1991	519	+5.1%
2001	634	+22.2%
2012	620	−2.2%
