= Abfaltersbach =

- Municipality
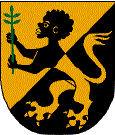
- Coat of arms

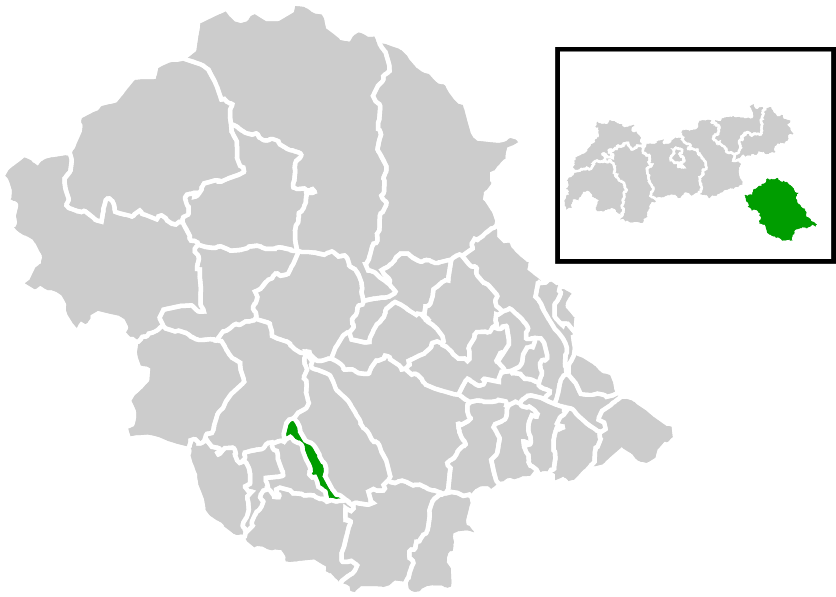
- Location within Lienz district

- Location within Austria
- Coordinates: 46°45′25″N 12°31′43″E
- Country: Austria
- State: Tyrol
- District: Lienz

Government
  - Mayor: Anton Brunner

Area
  - Total: 10.28 km^{2} (3.97 sq mi)
- Elevation: 983 m (3,225 ft)

Population (2021)
  - Total: 647
  - Density: 62.9/km^{2} (163/sq mi)
- Time zone: UTC+1 (CET)
  - Summer (DST): UTC+2 (CEST)
- Postal code: 9913
- Area code: 04846
- Vehicle registration: LZ
- Website: www.abfaltersbach.at

Abfaltersbach is a municipality in the district of Lienz in the Austrian state of Tyrol.

== Population ==
Historical population
Year	Pop.	±%
1869	404	—
1880	483	+19.6%
1890	453	−6.2%
1900	441	−2.6%
1910	465	+5.4%
1923	462	−0.6%
1934	451	−2.4%
1939	464	+2.9%
1951	538	+15.9%
1961	598	+11.2%
1971	617	+3.2%
1981	622	+0.8%
1991	617	−0.8%
2001	616	−0.2%
2011	654	+6.2%
