= East Tyrol =

Exclave of Tirol, Austria

Coordinates: 46.9°N 12.6°E

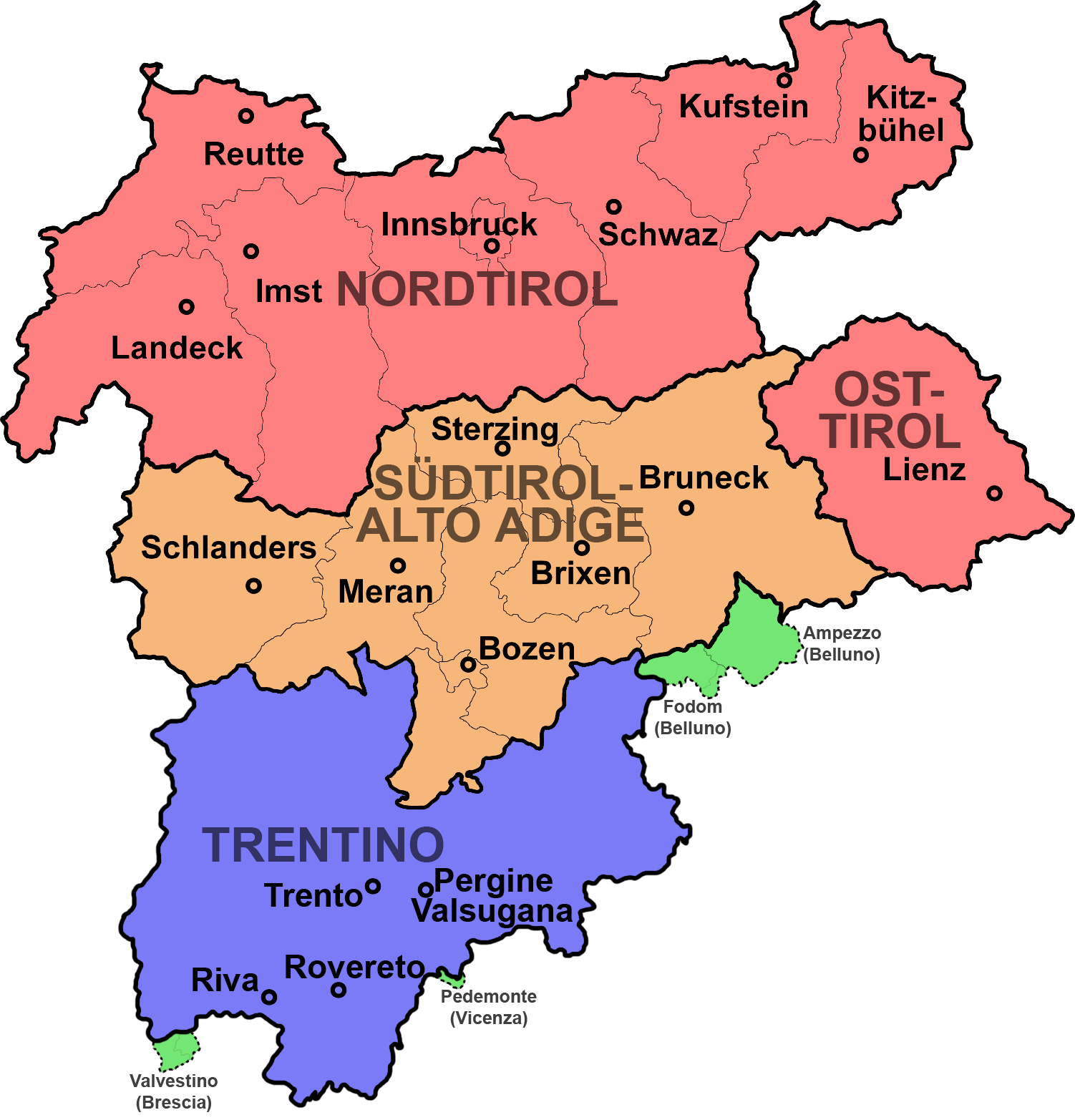
Territory of the former Austrian crown land of Tyrol, partitioned into Tyrol, Austria: North and East Tyrol South Tyrol, Italy Trentino, Italy Other now-Italian parts of the former county

East Tyrol, occasionally East Tirol (German: Osttirol), is an exclave of the Austrian state of Tyrol, separated from North Tyrol by parts of Salzburg State and parts of Italian South Tyrol (Südtirol, Italian: Alto Adige). It is coterminous with the administrative district (Bezirk) of Lienz.

== History ==
The area around the former Roman municipium of Aguntum was, from the 12th century, held by the Counts of Gorizia, who took their residence at Lienz and inherited the County of Tyrol in 1253. While Tyrol was lost to the Austrian House of Habsburg in 1363, the Gorizian counts retained Lienz until the extinction of the line in 1500. Emperor Maximilian I of Habsburg finally incorporated it into Austrian Tyrol.

East Tyrol's present-day situation arose from the defeat of the Austro-Hungarian Empire in World War I and its subsequent dissolution. By the 1915 Treaty of London, the Kingdom of Italy, which had joined the victorious Triple Entente, was to obtain the Tyrolean lands south of the Brenner Pass, as claimed by the Italian irredentism movement. In November 1918, the Italian Army occupied all Tyrol with 20,000-22,000 soldiers. Thus, under the 1919 Treaty of Saint-Germain-en-Laye, the rump state of German Austria had to cede to Italy the southern part of the former crown land of the Princely County of Tyrol, i.e. the present-day provinces of Trentino and South Tyrol and parts of the Belluno province.

After Germany's annexation of Austria in 1938, East Tyrol became part of the Reichsgau Kärnten (Carinthia). It was returned to Tyrol in 1947. After World War II, East Tyrol became part of the British occupied zone of Austria.

In Austria, East Tyrol borders the states of Carinthia in the east and Salzburg in the north, while it also shares borders with the Italian provinces of South Tyrol (Alto Adige, northern part of the region Trentino-Alto Adige) in the west and Belluno (the region Veneto) in the south. It is separated from the Tyrolean district of Schwaz in North Tyrol by a 9.5 km (5.9 mi) long common border of South Tyrol with the Salzburg Pinzgau region.

== Attractions ==
The High Tauern National Park is in East Tyrol, along with several mountains including the Großglockner (Austria's highest mountain, 3798 m), and Großvenediger.

== See also ==
- Tyrol
- History of Tyrol
- History of South Tyrol
- Trentino
- Euroregion Tyrol-South Tyrol-Trentino
