= Geography of Austria =

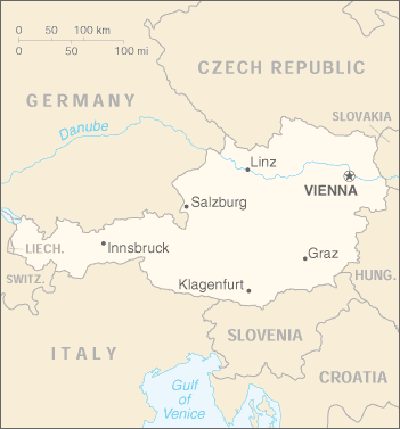
- Continent: Europe
- Region: Central Europe
- Coordinates: 47°20′N 13°20′E
- Coastline: 0 km (0 mi)
- Borders: Total: 2,534 km (1,575 mi); Czech Republic 402 km (250 mi); Germany 801 km (498 mi); Hungary 331 km (206 mi); Italy 404 km (251 mi); Liechtenstein (non-EU) 34 km (21 mi); Slovakia 105 km (65 mi); Slovenia 330 km (210 mi); Switzerland (non-EU) 158 km (98 mi)
- Highest point: Grossglockner; 3,797 m
- Lowest point: Lake Neusiedl; 115 m
- Longest river: Danube; 2,857 km
- Largest lake: Bodensee; 571 km^{2}
- Climate: continental climate Mediterranean climate

Austria is a predominantly mountainous country in Central Europe, approximately between Germany, Italy and Hungary. It has a total area of 83,871 square kilometres (32,383 sq mi).

Austria shares national borders with Switzerland (a non-European Union member state, which it borders for 158 km, or 98 mi) and the principality of Liechtenstein (also a non-EU member state, of which it borders for 34 km or 21 mi) to the west, Germany (801 km or 497 mi) and the Czech Republic (402 km or 249 mi) and Slovakia (105 km or 65 mi) to the north, Hungary to the east (331 km or 205 mi), and Slovenia (330 km or 185 mi) and Italy (404 km or 251 mi) to the south (total: 2,534 km or 1,574 mi).

The westernmost third of the somewhat pear-shaped country consists of a narrow corridor between Germany and Italy that is between 32 and 60 km (20 and 37 mi) wide. The rest of Austria lies to the east and has a maximum north–south width of 280 km (170 mi). The country measures almost 600 km (370 mi) in length, extending from Lake Constance (German Bodensee) on the Austrian-Swiss-German border in the west to the Neusiedler See on the Austrian-Hungarian border in the east. The contrast between these two lakes – one in the Alps and the other a typical steppe lake on the westernmost fringe of the Hungarian Plain – illustrates the diversity of Austria's landscape.

Seven of Austria's nine federal states have long historical traditions predating the establishment of the Republic of Austria in 1918: Upper Austria, Lower Austria, Styria, Carinthia, Salzburg, Tyrol, and Vorarlberg. The states of Burgenland and Vienna were established after World War I. Most of Burgenland had been part of the Kingdom of Hungary, but it had a predominantly German-speaking population and hence became Austrian. Administrative and ideological reasons played a role in the establishment of Vienna as an independent state. Vienna, historically the capital of Lower Austria, was a socialist stronghold, whereas Lower Austria was conservative, and both socialists and conservatives wanted to consolidate their influence in their respective states. Each state has a state capital with the exception of Vienna, which is a state in its own right in addition to being the federal capital. In Vienna, the City Council and the mayor function as a state parliament (Landtag) and state governor (Landeshauptmann), respectively.

== Physical geography ==
=== Landform regions ===
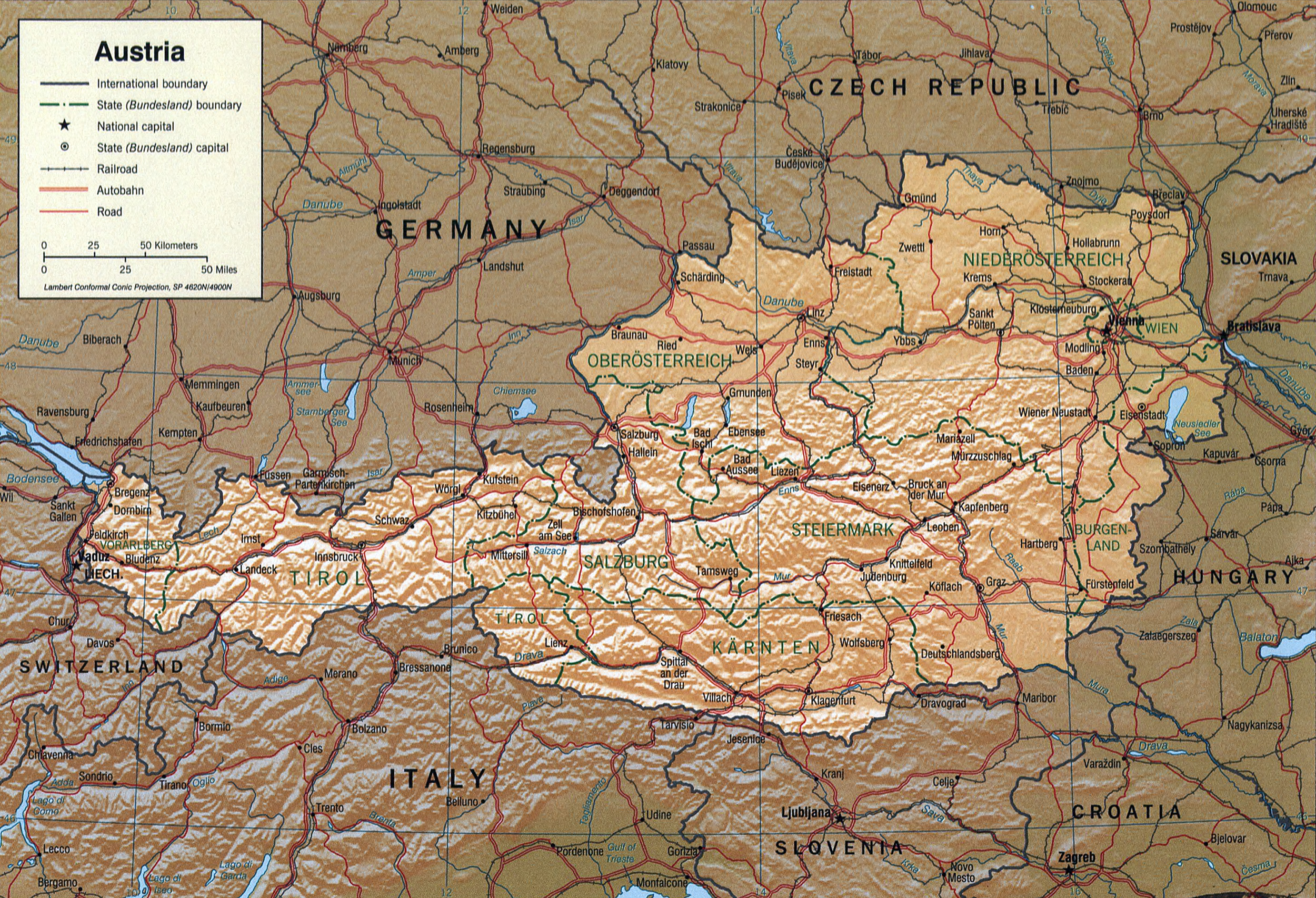
Detailed map of Austria

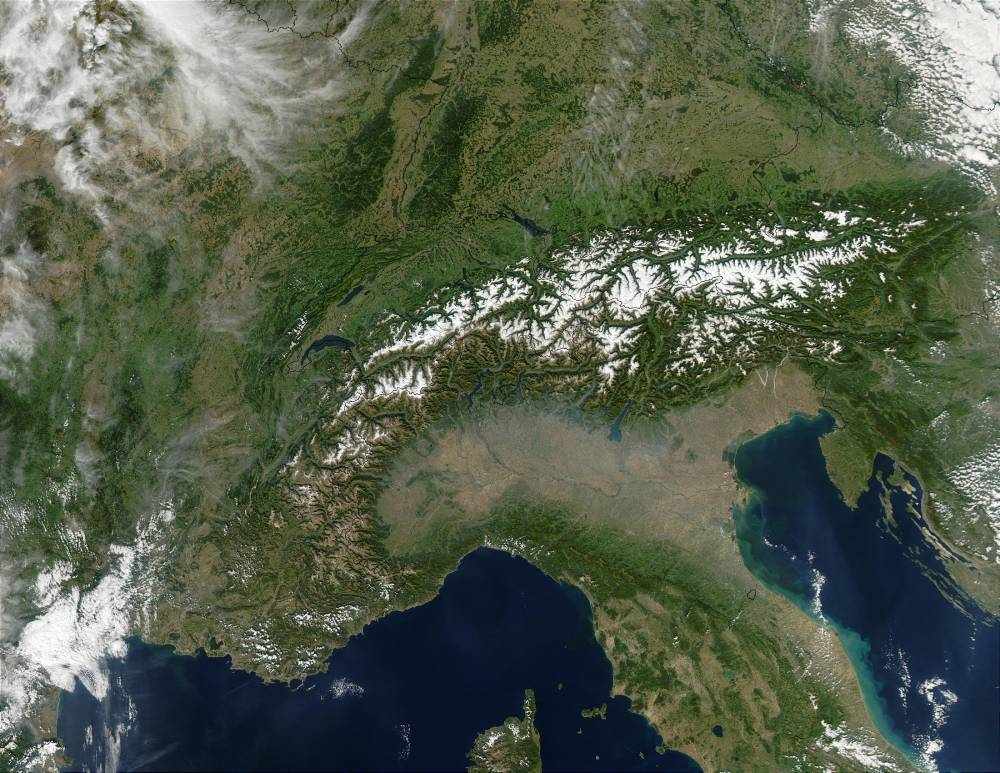
Satellite photo of the Alps

Austria may be divided into three unequal geographical areas. The largest part of Austria (62%) is occupied by the relatively young mountains of the Alps, but in the east, these give way to a part of the Pannonian plain, and north of the river Danube lies the Bohemian Forest, an older, but lower, granite mountain range.

==== River Danube ====
The Danube has its source near Donaueschingen in southwestern Germany and flows through Austria before emptying into the Black Sea. It is the only major European river that flows eastwards, and its importance as an inland waterway has been enhanced by the completion in 1992 of the Rhine-Main-Danube Canal in Bavaria, which connects the rivers Rhine and Main with the Danube and makes barge traffic from the North Sea to the Black Sea possible.

The major rivers north of the watershed of the Austrian Alps (the Inn in Tyrol, the Salzach in Salzburg, and the Enns in Styria and Upper Austria) are direct tributaries of the Danube and flow north into the Danube valley, whereas the rivers south of the watershed in central and eastern Austria (the Gail and Drau rivers in Carinthia and the Mürz and Mur in Styria) flow south into the drainage system of the Drau, which eventually empties into the Danube in Serbia. Consequently, central and eastern Austria are geographically oriented away from the watershed of the Alps: the provinces of Upper Austria and Lower Austria toward the Danube and the provinces of Carinthia and Styria toward the Drau.

==== The Alps ====
Three major ranges of the Alps – the Northern Calcareous Alps, Central Alps, and Southern Calcareous Alps – run west to east through Austria. The Central Alps, which consist largely of a granite base, are the largest and highest ranges in Austria. The Central Alps run from Tyrol to approximately the Styria-Lower Austria border and include areas that are permanently glaciated in the Ötztal Alps on the Tyrolean–Italian border and the High Tauern in East Tyrol and Carinthia. The Northern Calcareous Alps, which run from Vorarlberg through Tyrol into Salzburg along the German border and through Upper Austria and Lower Austria toward Vienna, and the Southern Calcareous Alps, on the Carinthia-Slovenia border, are predominantly limestone and dolomite. At 3,797 m, Großglockner is the highest mountain in Austria. As a general rule, the farther east the Northern and Central Alps run, the lower they become. The altitude of the mountains also drops north and south of the central ranges.

As a geographic feature, the Alps literally overshadow other landform regions. Just over 28% of Austria is moderately hilly or flat: the Northern Alpine Foreland, which includes the Danube Valley; the lowlands and hilly regions in northeastern and eastern Austria, which include the Danube Basin; and the rolling hills and lowlands of the Southeastern Alpine Foreland. The parts of Austria that are most suitable for settlement – that is, arable and climatically favorable – run north of the Alps through the provinces of Upper Austria and Lower Austria in the Danube Valley and then curve east and south of the Alps through Lower Austria, Vienna, Burgenland, and Styria. Austria's least mountainous landscape is southeast of the low Leithagebirge, which forms the southern lip of the Vienna Basin, where the steppe of the Hungarian Plain begins.

==== Bohemian Forest (mountain range) ====
The granite massif of the Bohemian Forest (known in German as the Böhmerwald), a low mountain range with bare and windswept plateaus and a harsh climate, is located north of the Danube Valley and covers the remaining 10% of Austria's area. Notable is the Manhartsberg a granite ridge which separates Waldviertel from Weinviertel.

=== Mountains ===
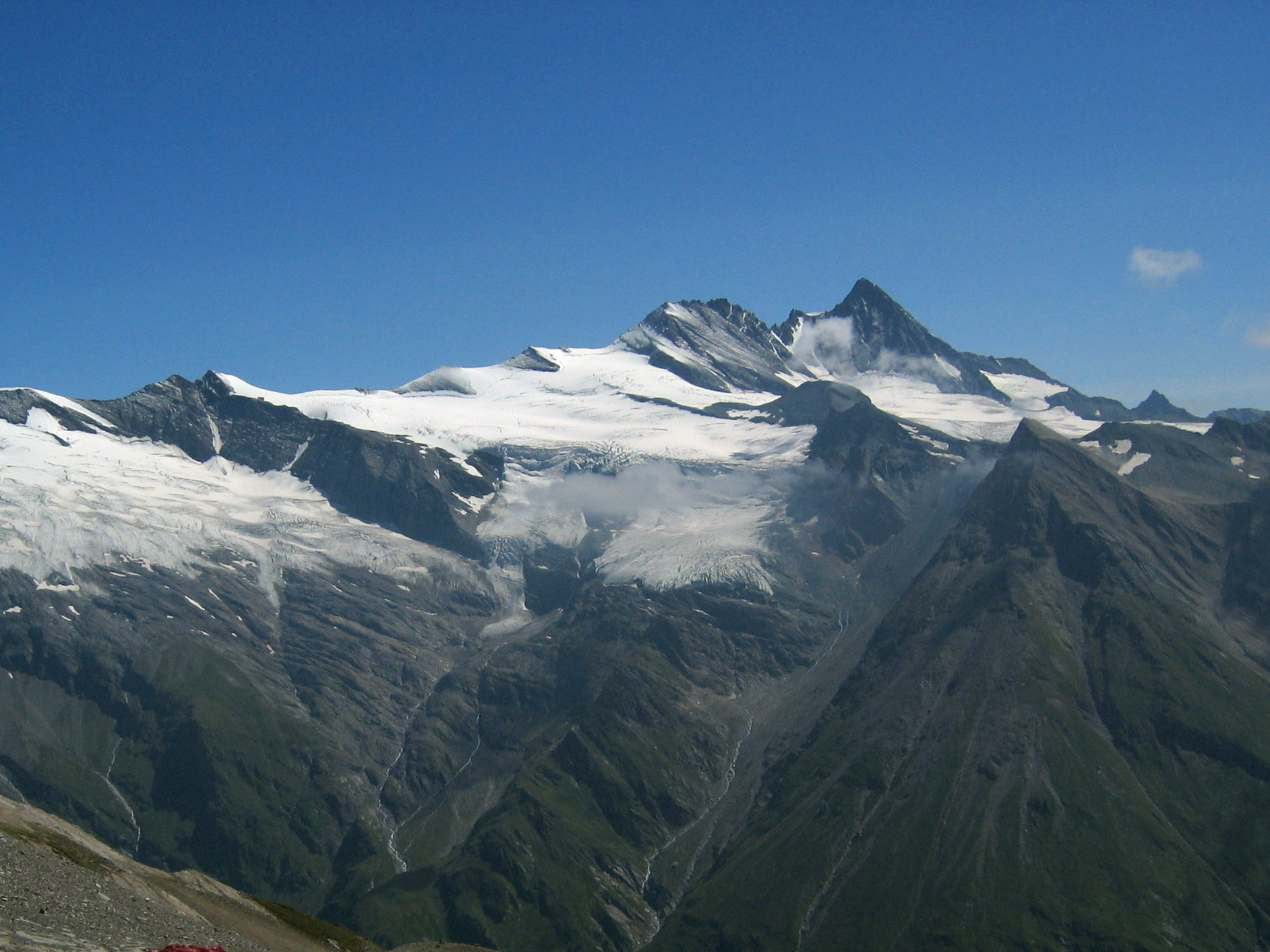
Großglockner, southern flank from a western perspective

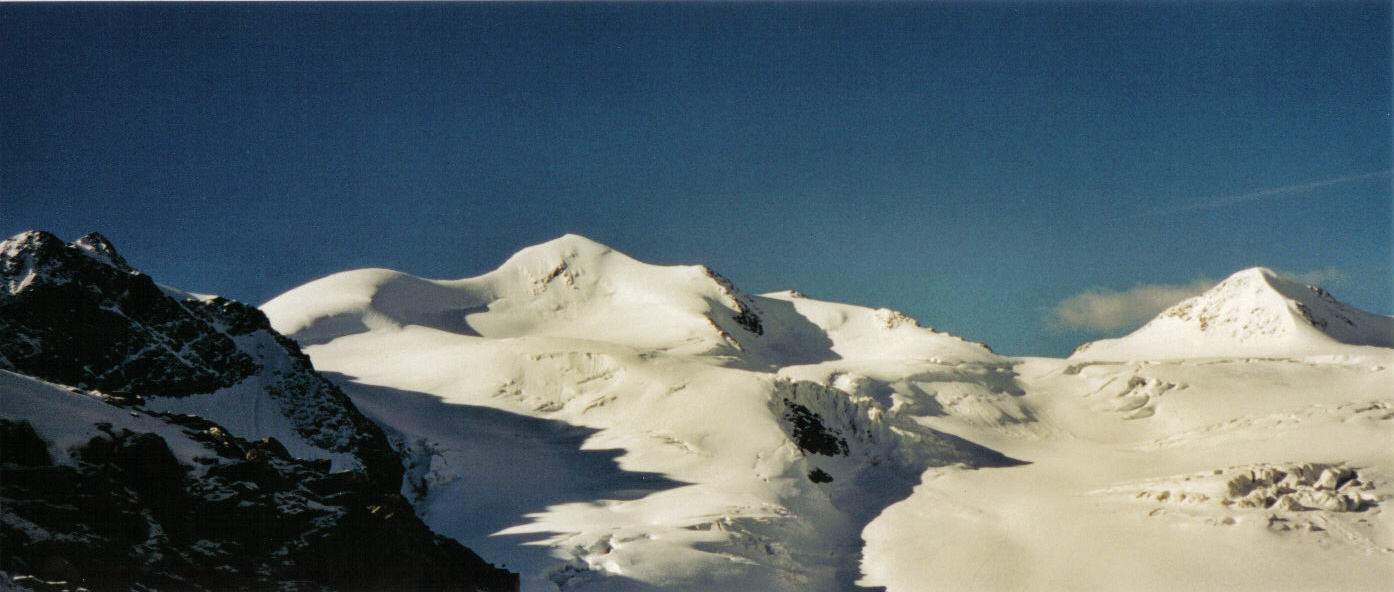
Wildspitze from the North

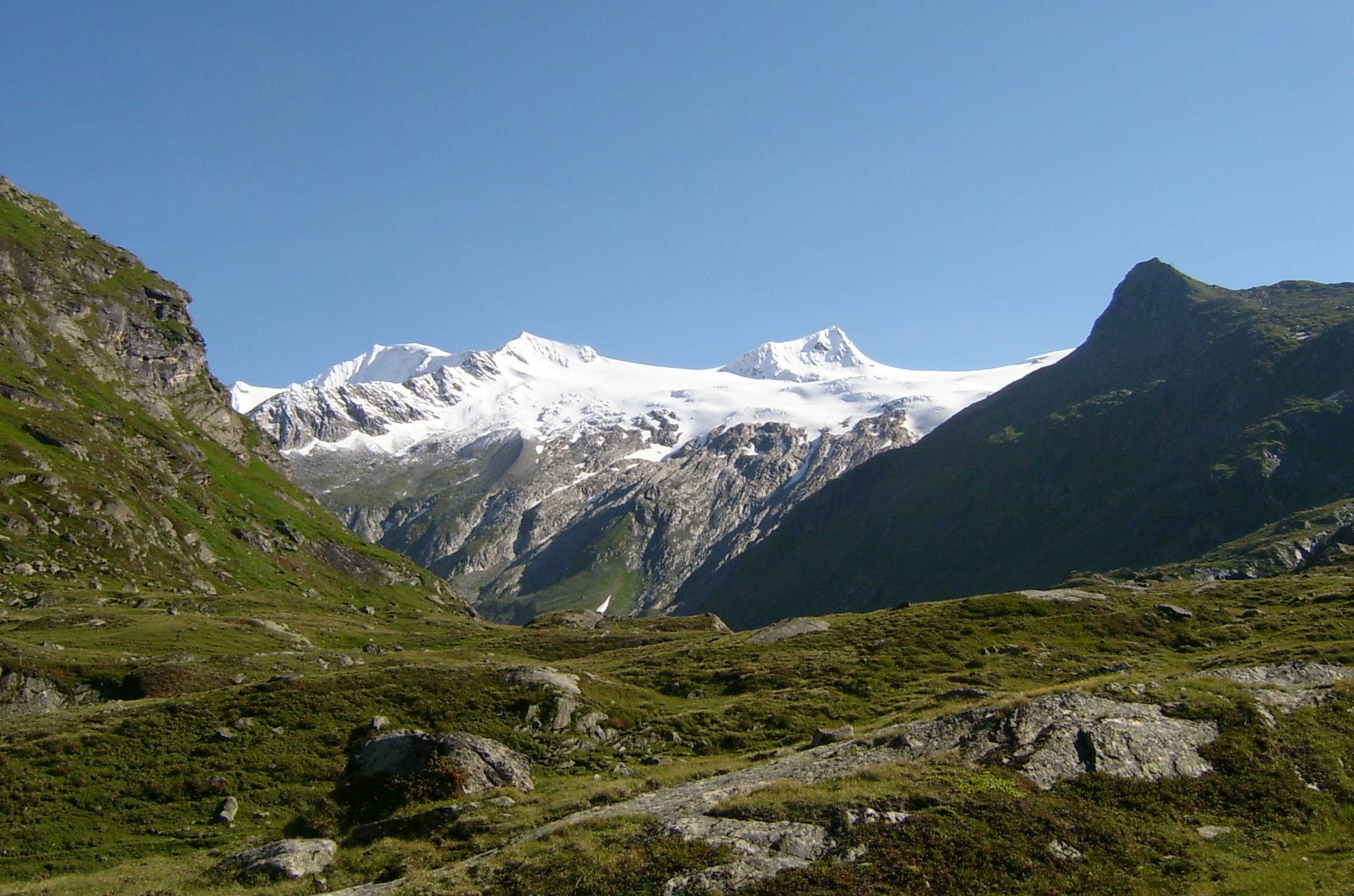
Großvenediger from the South

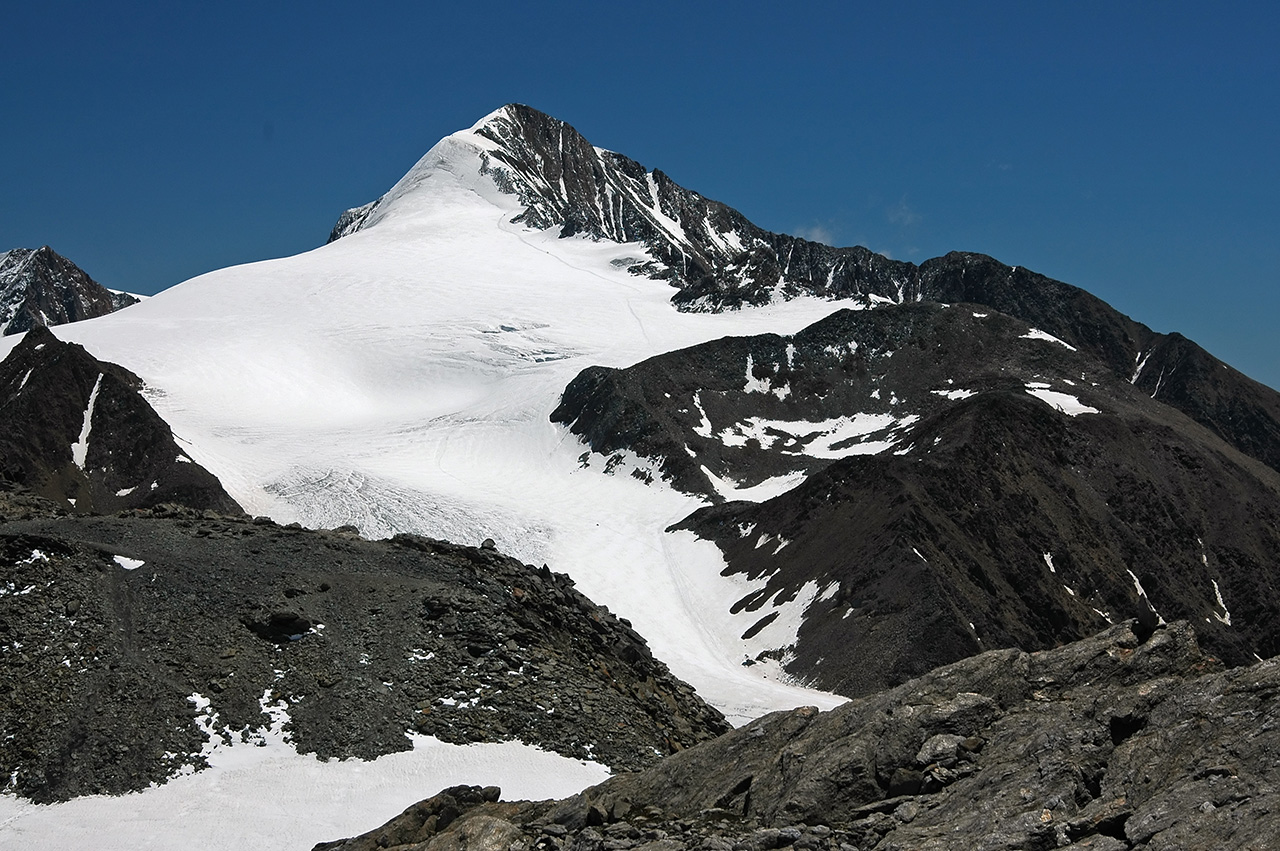
Similaun from the West

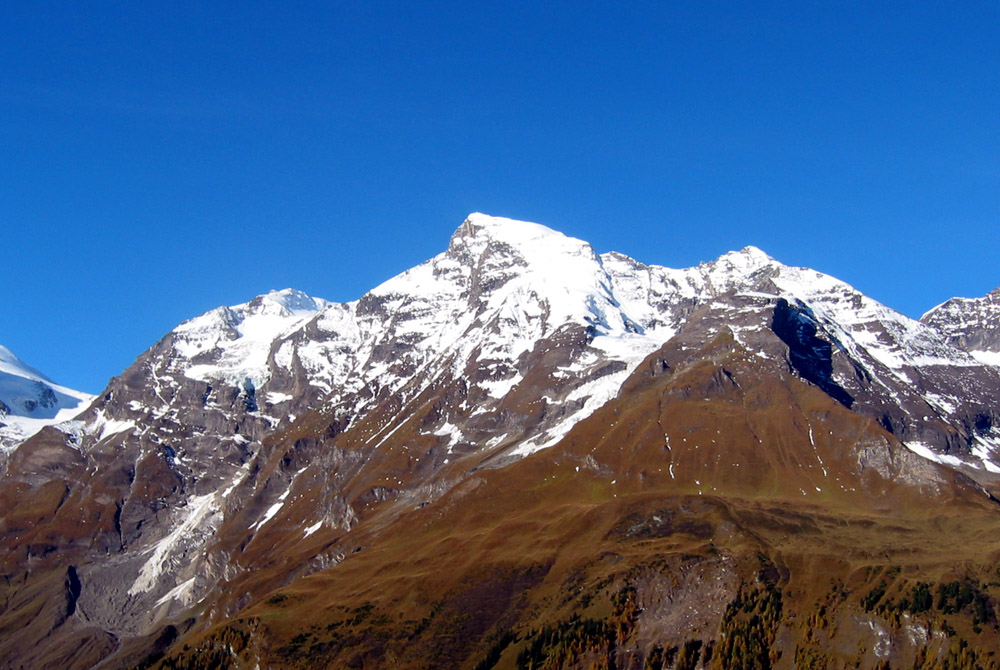
Großes Wiesbachhorn

The 35 highest mountains in Austria:

	Name	Height	Range
1	Großglockner	3,797 m	High Tauern
2	Wildspitze	3,772 m	Ötztal Alps
3	Kleinglockner	3,770 m	High Tauern
4	Weißkugel	3,739 m	Ötztal Alps
5	Pöschlturm	3,721 m	High Tauern
6	Hörtnagelturm	3,719 m	High Tauern
7	Hofmannspitze	3,711 m	High Tauern
8	Weitzenböckturm	3,702 m	High Tauern
9	Draschturm	3,701 m	High Tauern
10	Gerinturm	3,700 m	High Tauern
11	Glocknerhorn	3,680 m	High Tauern
12	Teufelshorn	3,677 m	High Tauern
13	Großvenediger	3,674 m	High Tauern
14	Hinterer Brochkogel	3,628 m	Ötztal Alps
15	Hintere Schwärze	3,628 m	Ötztal Alps
16	Similaun	3,606 m	Ötztal Alps
17	Großes Wiesbachhorn	3,564 m	High Tauern
18	Rainerhorn	3,560 m	High Tauern
19	Ötztaler Urkund	3,556 m	Ötztal Alps
20	Marzellspitze	3,555 m	Ötztal Alps
21	Ramolkogel	3,550 m	Ötztal Alps
22	Schalfkogel	3,540 m	Ötztal Alps
23	Watzespitze	3,533 m	Ötztal Alps
24	Hochvernagtspitze	3,530 m	Ötztal Alps
25	Langtaufererspitze	3,529 m	Ötztal Alps
26	Weißseespitze	3,526 m	Ötztal Alps
27	Mutmalspitze	3,522 m	Ötztal Alps
28	Fineilspitze	3,516 m	Ötztal Alps
29	Innere Querspitze	3,515 m	Ötztal Alps
30	Hochfeiler	3,510 m	Zillertal Alps
31	Teufelskamp	3,509 m	High Tauern
32	Romariswandkopf	3,508 m	High Tauern
33	Zuckerhütl	3,505 m	Stubai Alps
34	Hohes Aderl	3,504 m	High Tauern
35	Fluchtkogel	3,500 m	Ötztal Alps

(All heights are related to the 1875 Trieste tide gauge used in Austria - metres above the Adriatic)

=== Forests ===
In Austria forest cover is around 47% of the total land area, equivalent to 3,899,150 hectares (ha) of forest in 2020, up from 3,775,670 hectares (ha) in 1990. In 2020, naturally regenerating forest covered 2,227,500 hectares (ha) and planted forest covered 1,671,500 hectares (ha). Of the naturally regenerating forest 2% was reported to be primary forest (consisting of native tree species with no clearly visible indications of human activity) and around 23% of the forest area was found within protected areas. For the year 2015, 18% of the forest area was reported to be under public ownership, 82% private ownership and 0% with ownership listed as other or unknown.

== Human geography ==
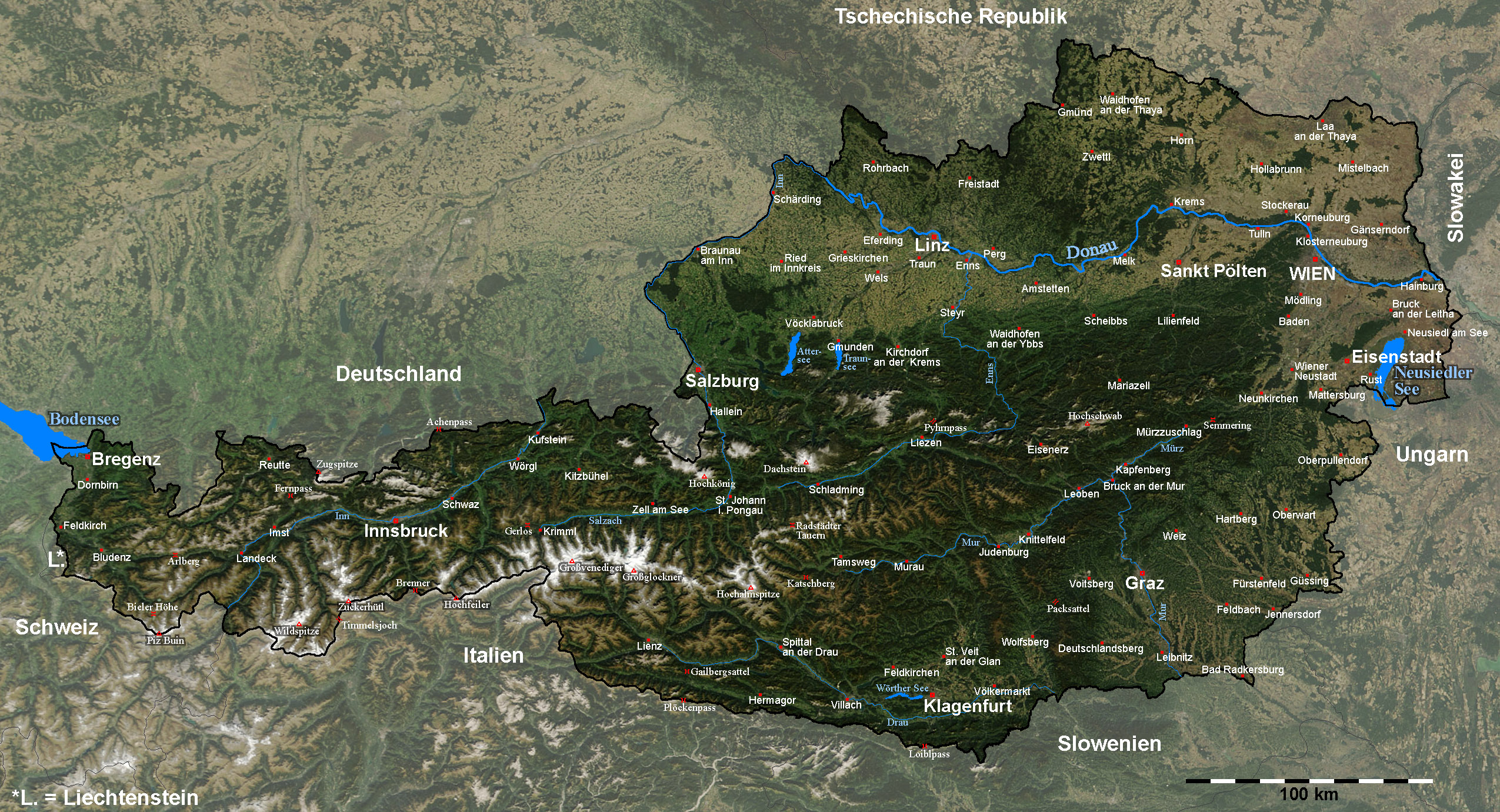
Annotated satellite map of Austria

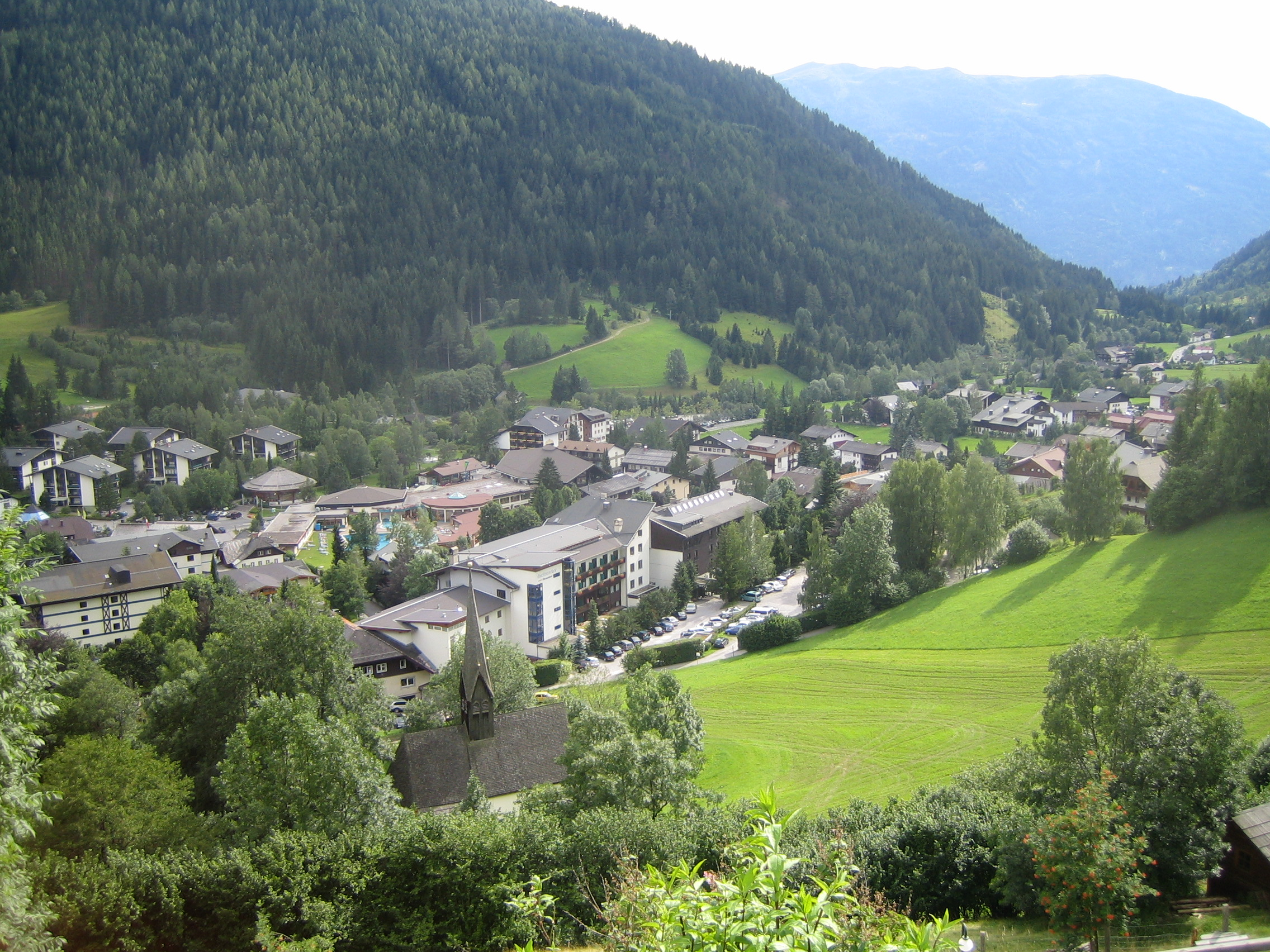
Bad Kleinkirchheim, Carinthia, Austria

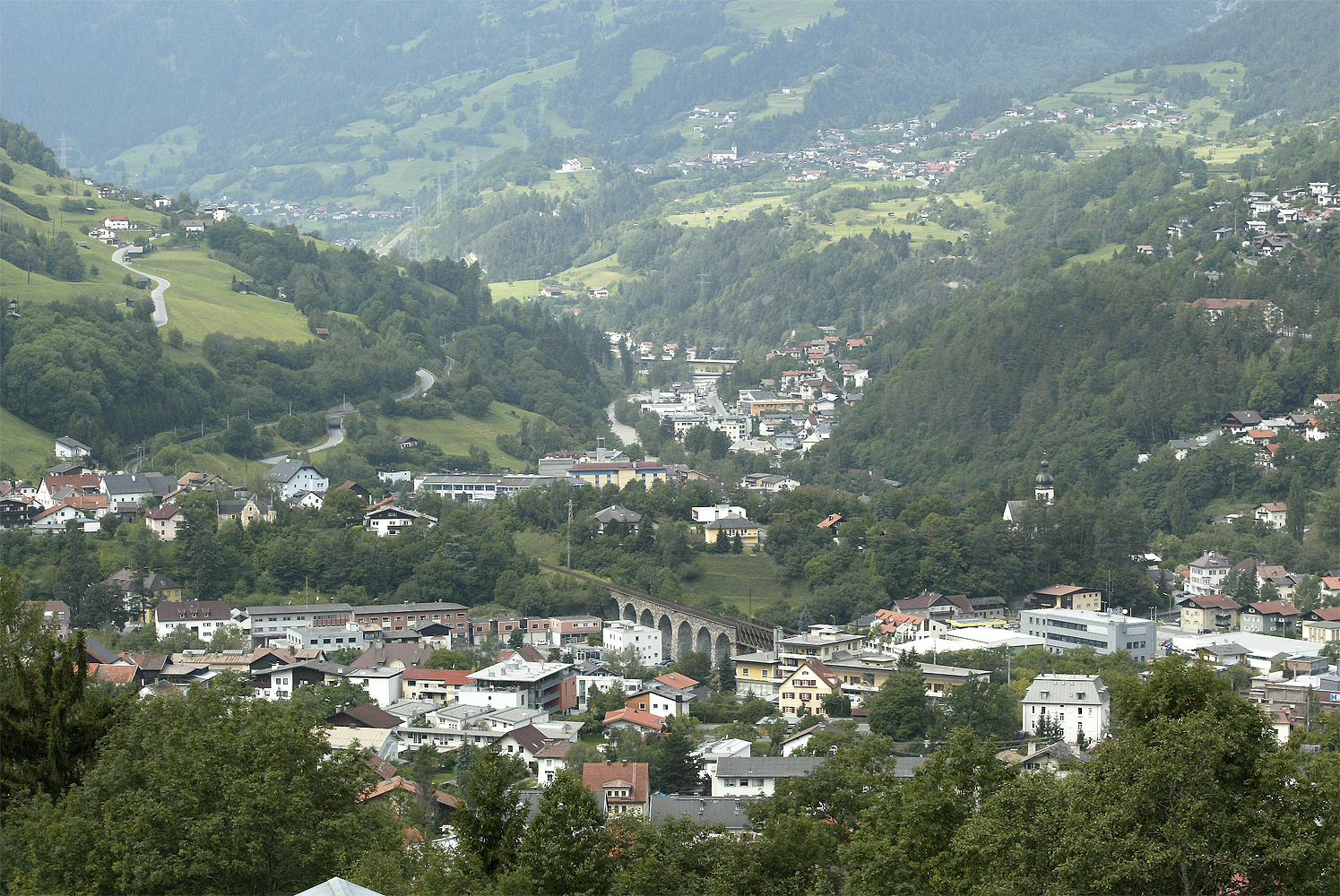
Landeck in Tyrol, Austria

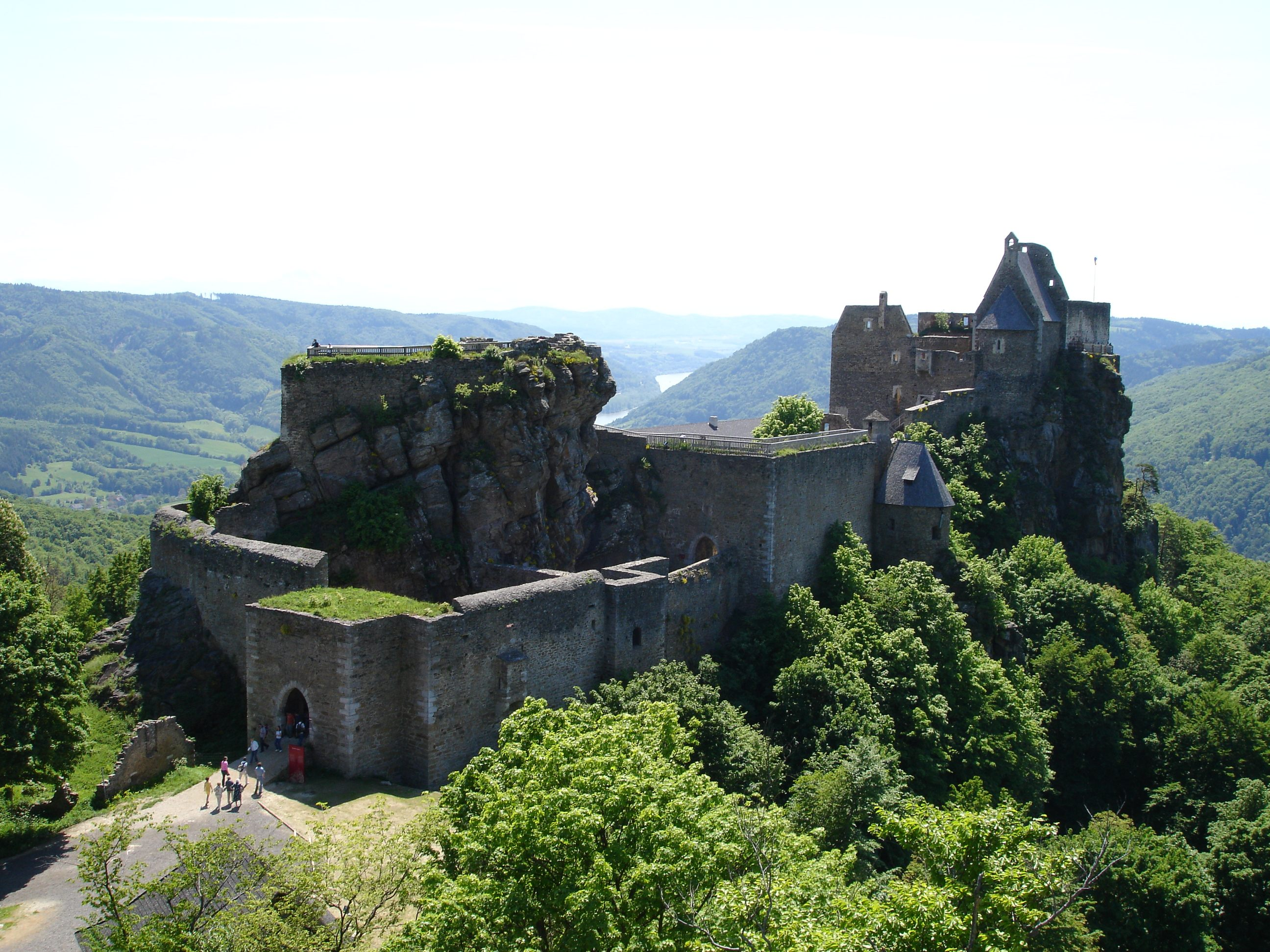
The ruin of Aggstein Castle overlooking the Danube (Wachau section) in Lower Austria

Land-use patterns in Austria change from Alpine to non-Alpine regions. Approximately one-tenth of Austria is barren or unproductive, that is, extremely Alpine or above the tree line. Just over 40% of Austria is covered by forests, the majority of which is in Alpine regions. Less than one-fifth of Austria is arable and suitable for conventional agriculture. The percentage of arable land in Austria increases in the East as the country becomes less alpine. More than one-fifth of Austria is pasture and meadow located at varying altitudes. Almost half of this grassland consists of high Alpine pastures.

Historically, high Alpine pastures have been used during the summer for grazing dairy cattle, thus making space available at lower altitudes for cultivating and harvesting fodder for winter. Many of the high pastures are at altitudes of more than 1,000 m.

Although agriculture in mountainous areas was at one time economically viable, in recent decades it has survived only with the help of extensive subsidies.

The Alps make many areas of Austria uninhabitable. Austria's so-called areas of permanent settlement – regions that are cultivated, continuously inhabited, and used for transportation, but do not include forests, Alpine pastures, or barren land – cover only 40% or 35,000 km^{2} of the country. The great majority of the area of permanent settlement is in the Danube valley and the lowlands or hilly regions north, east, and south of the Alps, where approximately two-thirds of the population lives.

In the country's predominantly Alpine provinces, most of the population live in river valleys: Bregenz on the shores of Lake Constance in Vorarlberg; Innsbruck on the river Inn in Tyrol; Salzburg on the river Salzach in Salzburg; and Klagenfurt on the Wörthersee lake in Carinthia. The higher the Alps are, the less inhabitable they become in terms of soil, microclimate, and vegetation. Conversely, the lower and broader the Alpine valleys are, the more densely populated they become.

Tyrol illustrates most clearly the relationship between Alpine geography and habitation. As the most mountainous province (less than 3% of the land is arable), it is the most sparsely inhabited, with an area of permanent settlement of only 15%.

Because of the Alps, the country as a whole is one of the least densely populated states of Western and Central Europe. With ninety-three inhabitants per square kilometre, Austria has a population density similar to that of the former Yugoslavia.

Austria's national borders and geography have corresponded very little. Since the fall of the Western Roman Empire, the Alps and the Danube have not served to mark political boundaries. Even within Austria, provincial borders were only occasionally set by the ranges and ridges of the Alps.

Although the Alps did not mark political boundaries, they often separated groups of people from one another. Because in the past the Alps were impassable, inhabitants isolated in valleys or networks of valleys developed distinct regional subcultures. Consequently, the inhabitants of one valley frequently maintained dialects, native or traditional dress, architectural styles, and folklore that substantially differed from those of the next valley. Differences were great enough that the origins of outsiders could easily be identified. However, mass media, mobility, prosperity, and tourism have eroded the distinctness of Alpine regional subcultures to a great extent by reducing the isolation that gave them their particular character.

Despite the Alps, Austria has historically been a land of transit. The Danube valley, for centuries Central Europe's aquatic link to the Balkan Peninsula and the "Orient" in the broadest sense of the word, has always been an avenue of east–west transit. However, Europe's division into two opposing economic and military blocs after World War II diminished Austria's importance as a place of transit. Since the opening of Eastern Europe in 1989, the country has begun to re-assume its historical role. By the early 1990s, it had already experienced a substantial increase in the number of people and vehicles crossing its eastern frontiers.

Within the Alps, four passes and the roads that run through them are of particular importance for north–south transit. The Semmering Pass on the provincial border of Lower Austria and Styria connects the Vienna Basin with the Mürz and Mur valleys, thus providing northeast–southwest access to Styria and Slovenia, and, via Carinthia, to Italy.

The Pyrhn Pass between the provinces of Upper Austria and Styria and the Tauern Pass between the High Tauern range and the Lower Tauern range of the Central Alps in Salzburg, provide access to the Mur Valley in Styria and the Drau Valley in Carinthia, respectively. The highways that run through these passes are important northwest–southeast lines of communication through the Alps. The Pyrhn highway has been nicknamed the Fremdarbeiterweg ("foreign workers' route") because millions of Gastarbeiter ("guest workers") in Germany use it to return to their homes in the Balkans and Turkey for vacation. Many Germans and northern Europeans also use it in the summer months to reach the Adriatic coast. After the outbreak of hostilities in Yugoslavia in the summer of 1991, however, a substantial amount of this traffic was re-routed through the Danube Valley and Hungary.

The most important pass in the Austrian Alps is the Brenner Pass, located on the Austrian-Italian border in Tyrol. At 1,370 m, it is one of the lowest Alpine passes. The route up the Inn valley and over the Brenner Pass has been historically an important and convenient route of north–south transit between Germany and Italy, and provides the most direct route between Europe's two most highly industrialized regions: Germany and northern Italy.

Natural resources: oil, lignite, timber, iron ore, copper, zinc, antimony, magnesite, tungsten, graphite, salt, hydropower

Land use:
arable land: 16.44%
permanent crops: 0.79%
other: 82.77% (2012)

Irrigated land: 1,170 km^{2} (2007)

Total renewable water resources: 77.7 km^{3} (2011)

Freshwater withdrawal (domestic/industrial/agricultural)
total: 3.66 km^{3}/yr (18%/79%/3%)
per capital: 452.4 m^{3}/yr (2008)

== Climate ==
Köppen climate classification types of Austria

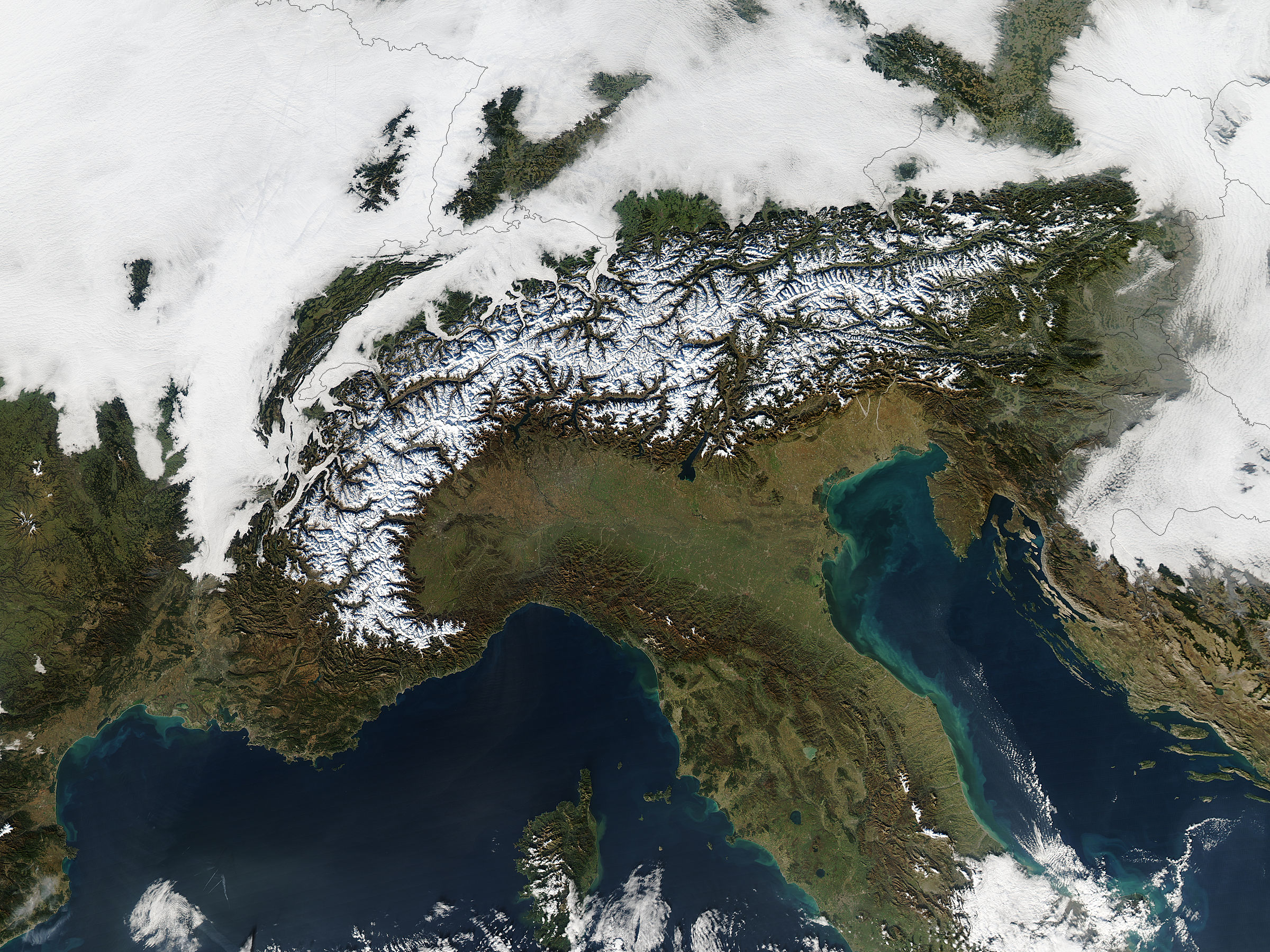
Heralding the oncoming winter, snow dusts the peaks of the Alps on December 11, 2004. North of the Alps, clouds cover France, Switzerland, Liechtenstein, Austria, and Slovakia. South of the Alps, clear skies dominate most of the image, leaving the Po River Valley and peninsular Italy showing clearly. To the southwest, the Ligurian and Mediterranean Seas are an almost uniform deep blue color; to the southeast, the Adriatic Sea features swirls of blue-green microscopic sea organisms (likely phytoplankton and algae), as well as some green-tan sediment from rivers emptying into the sea.

The Alps serve as a watershed for Europe's three major kinds of weather systems that influence Austrian weather. The Atlantic maritime climate from the northwest is characterized by low-pressure fronts, mild air from the Gulf Stream, and precipitation. It has the greatest influence on the northern slopes of the Alps, the Northern Alpine Foreland, and the Danube valley. The continental climate is characterized by low pressure fronts with precipitation in summer and high pressure systems with cold and dry air in winter. It affects mainly eastern Austria. Mediterranean high-pressure systems from the south are characterized by few clouds and warm air, and they influence the weather of the southern slopes of the Alps and that of the Southeastern Alpine Foreland, making them the most temperate part of Austria.

One peculiarity of the Mediterranean weather systems is the föhn wind, a warm air mass that originates in the African Sahara and moves north rapidly, periodically raising temperatures up to 10 °C (18 °F) in a short period of time. Many people respond to this rapid weather change with headaches, irritability, and circulatory problems. During the winter, the rapid warming that accompanies a föhn can thaw the snow cover in the Alps to such an extent that avalanches occur.

Given the importance of Alpine skiing for the Austrian tourist industry, December is the month during which the weather is watched with the greatest anticipation. As a rule, Atlantic maritime weather systems bring snow, and continental weather systems help keep it. However, a predominance of cold, dry continental systems or warm Mediterranean ones inevitably postpone the beginning of the ski season. In the summer, Mediterranean high-pressure systems bring warm, sunny weather.

Climate data for Lech, Vorarlberg (1440 m; average temperatures 1982 – 2012) Dfc, bordering on Dfb.
Month	Jan	Feb	Mar	Apr	May	Jun	Jul	Aug	Sep	Oct	Nov	Dec	Year
Mean daily maximum °C (°F)	−0.7 (30.7)	0.3 (32.5)	3.5 (38.3)	7.1 (44.8)	11.8 (53.2)	17.4 (63.3)	16.8 (62.2)	14.3 (57.7)	15.1 (59.2)	9.7 (49.5)	3.7 (38.7)	0.1 (32.2)	8.3 (46.9)
Daily mean °C (°F)	−4.5 (23.9)	−3.7 (25.3)	−0.6 (30.9)	2.9 (37.2)	7.3 (45.1)	10.6 (51.1)	12.7 (54.9)	12.2 (54.0)	9.9 (49.8)	5.6 (42.1)	0.4 (32.7)	−3.3 (26.1)	4.1 (39.4)
Mean daily minimum °C (°F)	−8.2 (17.2)	−7.6 (18.3)	−4.7 (23.5)	−1.3 (29.7)	2.8 (37.0)	6.0 (42.8)	8.0 (46.4)	7.7 (45.9)	5.6 (42.1)	1.6 (34.9)	−2.9 (26.8)	−6.6 (20.1)	0.0 (32.1)
Average precipitation mm (inches)	59 (2.3)	54 (2.1)	56 (2.2)	70 (2.8)	103 (4.1)	113 (4.4)	133 (5.2)	136 (5.4)	95 (3.7)	67 (2.6)	78 (3.1)	66 (2.6)	1,030 (40.5)
Source: "Lech climate data".

Climate data for Kühtai, Tyrol(2060 m; average temperatures 1982 – 2012) ET, somewhat close to Dfc.
Month	Jan	Feb	Mar	Apr	May	Jun	Jul	Aug	Sep	Oct	Nov	Dec	Year
Mean daily maximum °C (°F)	−3.3 (26.1)	−3.2 (26.2)	−0.9 (30.4)	2.3 (36.1)	7.0 (44.6)	10.4 (50.7)	12.7 (54.9)	12.3 (54.1)	9.6 (49.3)	6.3 (43.3)	0.5 (32.9)	−2.4 (27.7)	4.3 (39.7)
Daily mean °C (°F)	−6.6 (20.1)	−6.5 (20.3)	−4.2 (24.4)	−1.1 (30.0)	3.4 (38.1)	6.6 (43.9)	8.8 (47.8)	8.6 (47.5)	6.4 (43.5)	2.9 (37.2)	−2.4 (27.7)	−5.4 (22.3)	0.9 (33.6)
Mean daily minimum °C (°F)	−9.9 (14.2)	−9.8 (14.4)	−7.5 (18.5)	−4.4 (24.1)	−0.2 (31.6)	2.9 (37.2)	4.9 (40.8)	4.9 (40.8)	3.3 (37.9)	−0.5 (31.1)	−5.2 (22.6)	−8.4 (16.9)	−2.5 (27.5)
Average precipitation mm (inches)	73 (2.9)	66 (2.6)	80 (3.1)	87 (3.4)	115 (4.5)	126 (5.0)	148 (5.8)	138 (5.4)	96 (3.8)	74 (2.9)	83 (3.3)	72 (2.8)	1,158 (45.5)
Source: "Kühtai climate data".

== Ecological concerns ==
Austrians faced a number of ecological problems in the 1990s. One of the most pressing is the pollution caused by the staggering increase of traffic through the country. Traffic on the superhighway going through the Brenner Pass has, for example, increased from 600,000 vehicles per year in the early 1970s to over 10 million per year in the early 1990s. One quarter of the traffic crossing Austria consists of semitrailers used for heavy transport. The opening of Eastern Europe has only exacerbated the problem of transit traffic.

The Alpine valleys through which much of this traffic passes are unusually vulnerable to ecological damage. Narrow valleys are not conducive to dissipation of noise or pollutants caused by motor vehicles. Inversions – cold layers of air that trap warm layers of air or warm layers of air that trap cold layers in the valleys and lowlands – also seasonally contribute to the magnitude of the pollution problem.

Austria has negotiated with the EU to set limits on the amount of commercial transit traffic, especially through Tyrol. Work is also under way to develop a "piggy-back" system of loading semitrailers on to flatbed railroad cars in southern Germany and northern Italy, transporting them through Tyrol by rail. Environmentalists have pushed for measures that are more far-reaching. They advocate, for example, digging a tunnel from Garmisch-Partenkirchen in southern Germany to Bolzano in northern Italy.

Pollution is also brought by the weather systems that determine the country's climate. Atlantic maritime weather systems carry pollution into Austria from northwestern Europe. Austria's proximity to industrialized regions of former Communist states, with negligible or no pollution control policies or equipment, combined with the influence of continental weather systems also have proved to be extremely harmful. Mediterranean weather systems transmit industrial pollutants from northern Italy.

As a result of domestic and foreign pollution, 37% of Austria's forests had been damaged by acid rain and/or pollutant emissions by 1991. The damage to forests has had dire consequences, including the decimation of forests that for centuries had protected many Alpine communities from avalanches, erosion, mudslides, or flooding caused by runoff.

The seriousness of the ecological problems confronting the country gave rise in the 1970s to an environmentalist movement. Political parties were formed, and representatives were elected to parliament. A referendum in 1978 closed down a newly completed nuclear power station and turned the country away from the exploitation of nuclear energy. Public opposition in 1984 stopped the planned construction of a hydroelectric power station in a wetlands region.

The country's long-standing commercial use of the Alps for recreational purposes has also come under examination. Extensive tourism places an inordinate amount of pressure on sensitive Alpine ecosystems. Ski runs damage forests, as do summer sports such as off-trail mountain hiking or mountain biking. Many Alpine villages have also grown greatly because of the tourist industry. In extreme cases, they have up to twenty hotel beds for each inhabitant, a ratio that places a disproportionate seasonal burden on communal infrastructures and the environment. For these reasons, efforts have been made to introduce "green" or "soft" forms of tourism that are more compatible with the Alpine environment.

Part of the solution to Austria's ecological problems is being sought in stricter environmental legislation at the domestic level. Ultimately, however, pan-European and global cooperation in the realm of pollution and emission control will be necessary to protect the country's environment.

Environment - current issues: some forest degradation caused by air and soil pollution; soil pollution results from the use of agricultural chemicals; air pollution results from emissions by coal- and oil-fired power stations and industrial plants and from trucks transiting Austria between northern and southern Europe

Environment - international agreements:
party to: Air Pollution, Air Pollution-Nitrogen Oxides, Air Pollution-Sulphur 85, Air Pollution-Sulphur 94, Air Pollution-Volatile Organic Compounds, Antarctic Treaty, Biodiversity, Climate Change, Desertification, Endangered Species, Environmental Modification, Hazardous Wastes, Law of the Sea, Nuclear Test Ban, Ozone Layer Protection, Ship Pollution, Tropical Timber 83, Tropical Timber 94, Wetlands, Whaling
signed, but not ratified: Air Pollution-Persistent Organic Pollutants, Antarctic-Environmental Protocol, Climate Change-Kyoto Protocol

== Area and boundaries ==
Bordering Nations

=== Area ===
- Total: 83,879 km^{2}

country comparison to the world: 120

- Land: 82,453 km^{2}
- Water: 1,426 km^{2}

=== Area comparison ===
- Australia comparative: slightly larger than Tasmania
- China comparative: about half of Jiangxi
- Canada comparative: larger than New Brunswick
- United Kingdom comparative: slightly larger than Scotland
- United States comparative: slightly larger than South Carolina
- EU comparative: slightly smaller than the island of Ireland

== Extreme points ==
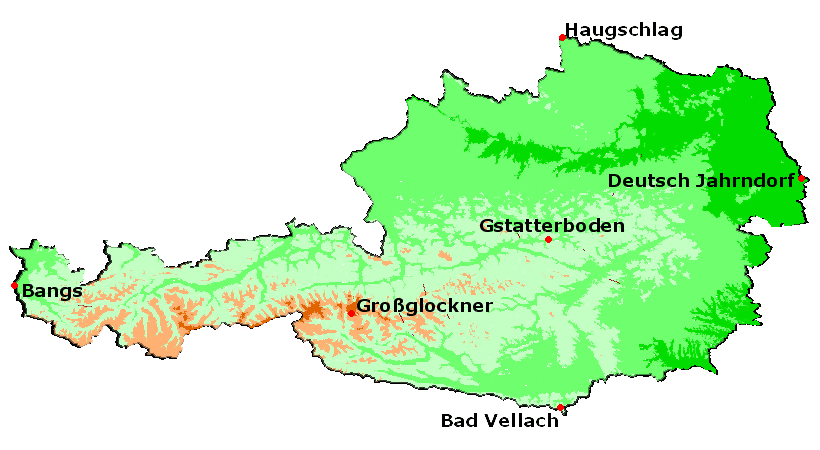
Map of the extreme points of Austria

=== Elevation ===
- Highest point: Großglockner, at 3,797 m, 47°4′30″N 12°41′40″E, Heiligenblut am Großglockner, Carinthia / Kals am Großglockner, Tyrol
- Lowest point: Hedwighof (Municipality Apetlon), at 114 m, 47°44′6″N 16°51′48″E, Apetlon, Burgenland

=== Latitude and longitude ===
- Westernmost point: River Rhine (at tripoint border of Austria, Switzerland, and Liechtenstein), Feldkirch, Vorarlberg, 47°16′16″N 9°31′51″E, but note that the international borders between Austria, Germany and Switzerland are not agreed for Lake Constance.
- Westernmost settlement: Feldkirch, Vorarlberg, 47°15′56″N 9°32′42″E
- Easternmost point: the corner of a field in Deutsch Jahrndorf, Burgenland (at tripoint border of Austria, Hungary, and Slovakia), 48°0′24″N 17°9′38″E
- Easternmost settlement: Deutsch Jahrndorf, Burgenland, 48°0′37″N 17°6′33″E
- Northernmost point: the Koštěnický potok stream, near Haugschlag, Lower Austria, 49°1′14″N 15°1′16″E
- Northernmost settlement: Haugschlag, Lower Austria, 48°59′51″N 15°3′32″E
- Southernmost point: in the Steiner Alpen, Eisenkappel-Vellach, Carinthia, between the Seeländer Sattel and the Sanntaler Sattel, at an altitude of more than 2000 m, 46°22′21″N 14°33′55″E
- Southernmost settlement: Eisenkappel-Vellach, Carinthia, 46°25′37″N 14°32′58″E

=== Centre ===
- Geographical centre: 47°41′47.5″N 13°20′44.5″E, Sankt Gilgen, Salzburg State (Land Salzburg)
- Furthest point from any international border: near Gstatterboden, Weng im Gesäuse, in the Gesäuse National Park, Styria, over 100 km from any border, 47°35′30″N 14°38′0″E

== See also ==
- National parks of Austria
- Wikimedia Atlas of Austria
