= Martin Klotz =

Martin Klotz was an Austrian mountaineer. With his brother Sepp he led the first party to reach the summit of Großglockner, the highest mountain in Austria in 1800.

The Klotz brothers were carpenters in Heiligenblut. They led the first recorded expedition to Großlockner in 1799, funded by Cardinal Franz Xaver von Salm-Reifferscheid. Bad weather caused the bearers to refuse to continue on (the first bearer strike in the history of mountain climbing). On 25 August 1799 the cardinal stayed at the Adlersruhe with most of the rest of the party, including scientists, clergymen, and a cook, as two members of the team (including Sigmund von Hohenwart) climbed on with four ordinary members of the expedition acting as 'sherpas'. One of the team reached the lesser peak of Kleinglockner that day.

The cardinal arranged a second assault in the following summer. He assembled a party of 62 people including 47 guides. On 28 July 1800 the brothers reached the summit of Grossglockner with two other carpenters, J. Zopoth and Franz Josef Horasch, vicar of Dölsach, and one other person.
