= Col =

Lowest point on a mountain ridge between two peaks

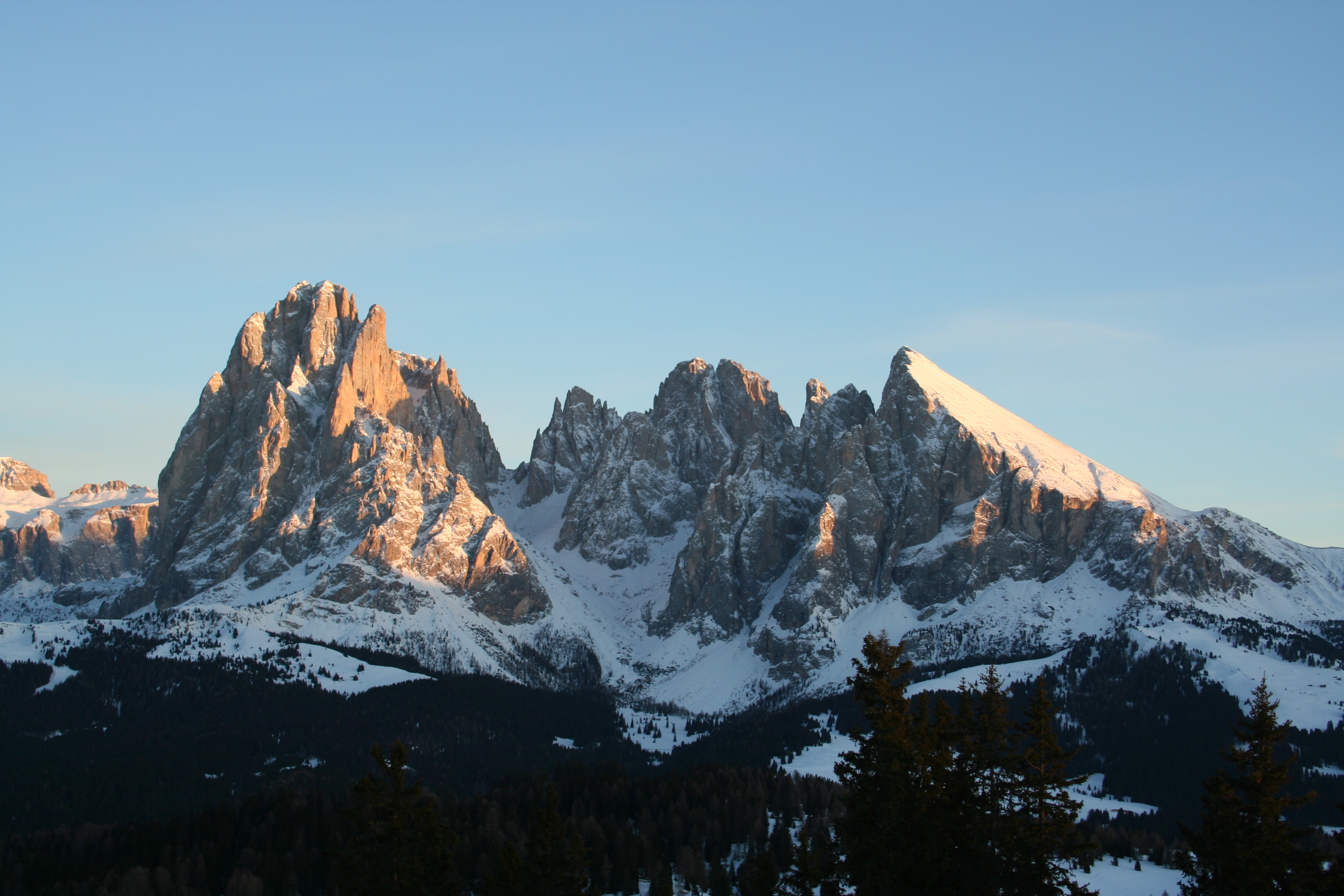
The Langkofel Group in the Dolomites of the Italian Alps, with the clearly visible Langkofel Col (Langkofelscharte) left of centre

A col in geomorphology is the lowest point on a mountain ridge between two peaks. It may also be called a gap or pass. Particularly rugged and forbidding cols in the terrain are usually referred to as notches. They are generally unsuitable as mountain passes, but are occasionally crossed by mule tracks or climbers' routes. Derived from the French col ('collar, neck') from Latin collum, 'neck', the term tends to be associated more with mountain than hill ranges. The distinction with other names for breaks in mountain ridges such as saddle, wind gap or notch is not sharply defined and may vary from place to place. Many double summits are separated by prominent cols.

The height of a summit above its highest col (called the key col) is effectively a measure of a mountain's topographic prominence.

Cols lie on the line of the watershed between two mountains, often on a prominent ridge or arête. For example, the highest col in Austria, the Obere Glocknerscharte ("Upper Glockner Col", 3,766 m (AA)) lies between the Kleinglockner (3,783 m above sea level (AA)) and Grossglockner (3,798 m above sea level (AA)) mountains, giving the Kleinglockner a minimum prominence of 17 metres.

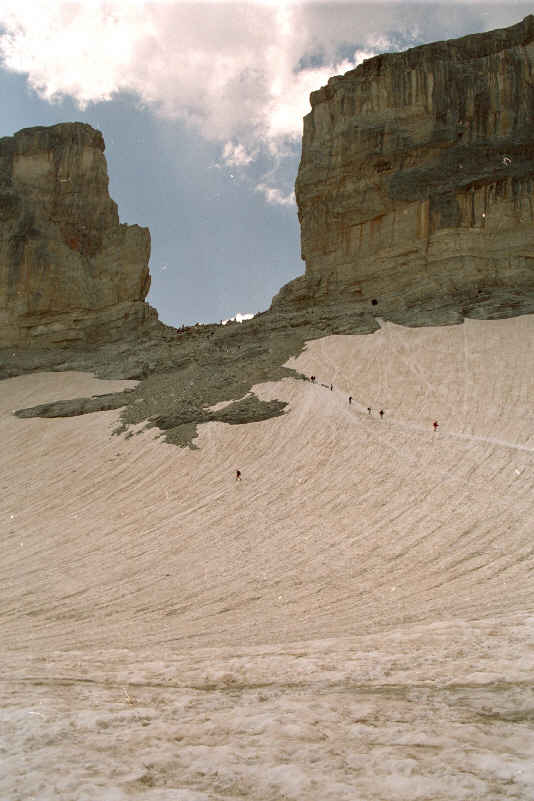
Brèche de Roland in the Pyrenees

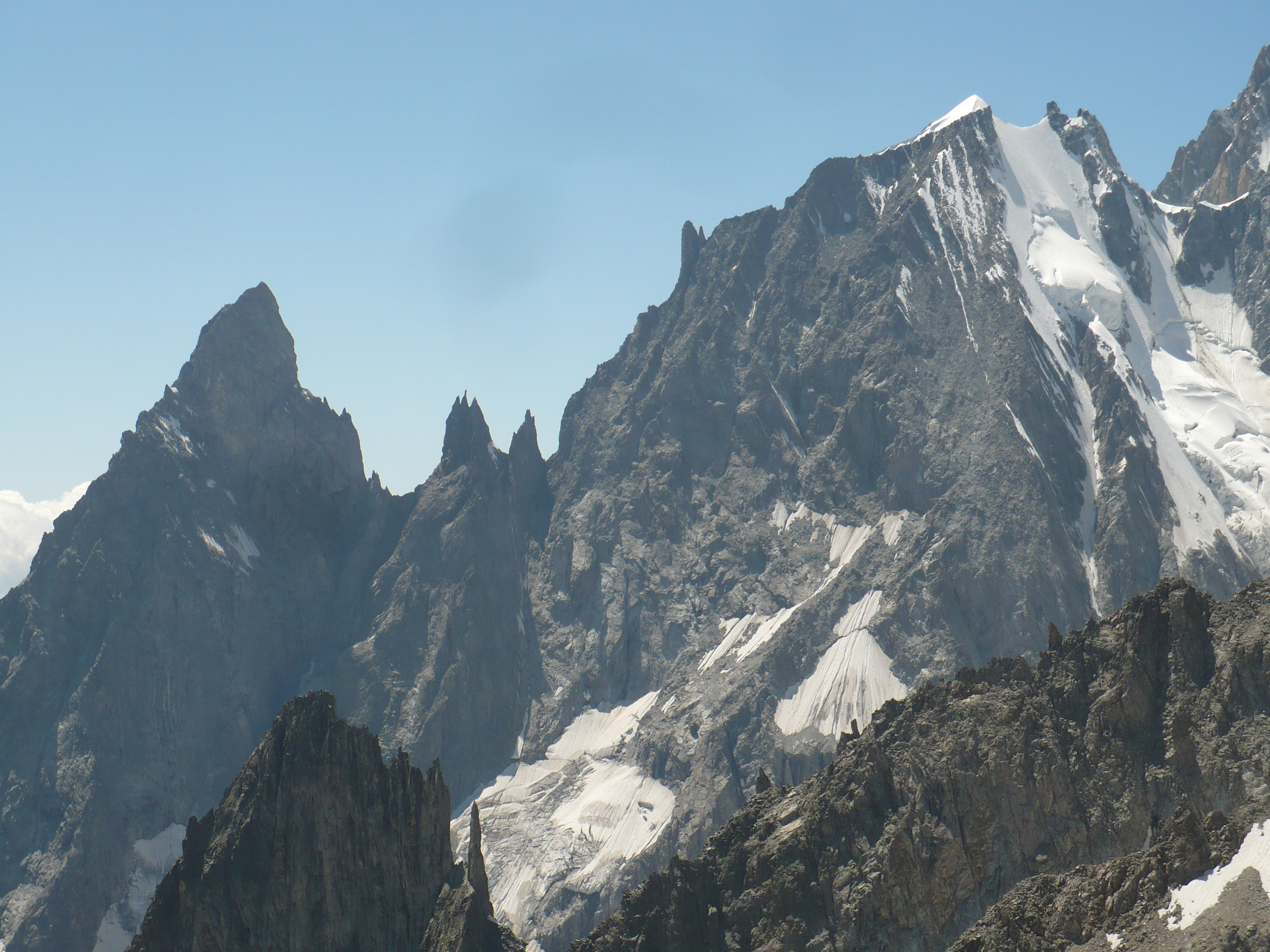
The Peuterey Ridge on the Mt. Blanc massif. From left to right Aiguille Noire de Peuterey (3773 m), Brèche-sud (3429 m), the Dames Anglaises (3601 m), Brèche-central, L'Isolée, Brèche-nord (3491 m), Aiguille Blanche de Peuterey (4112 m) and Col de Peuterey (3934 m)

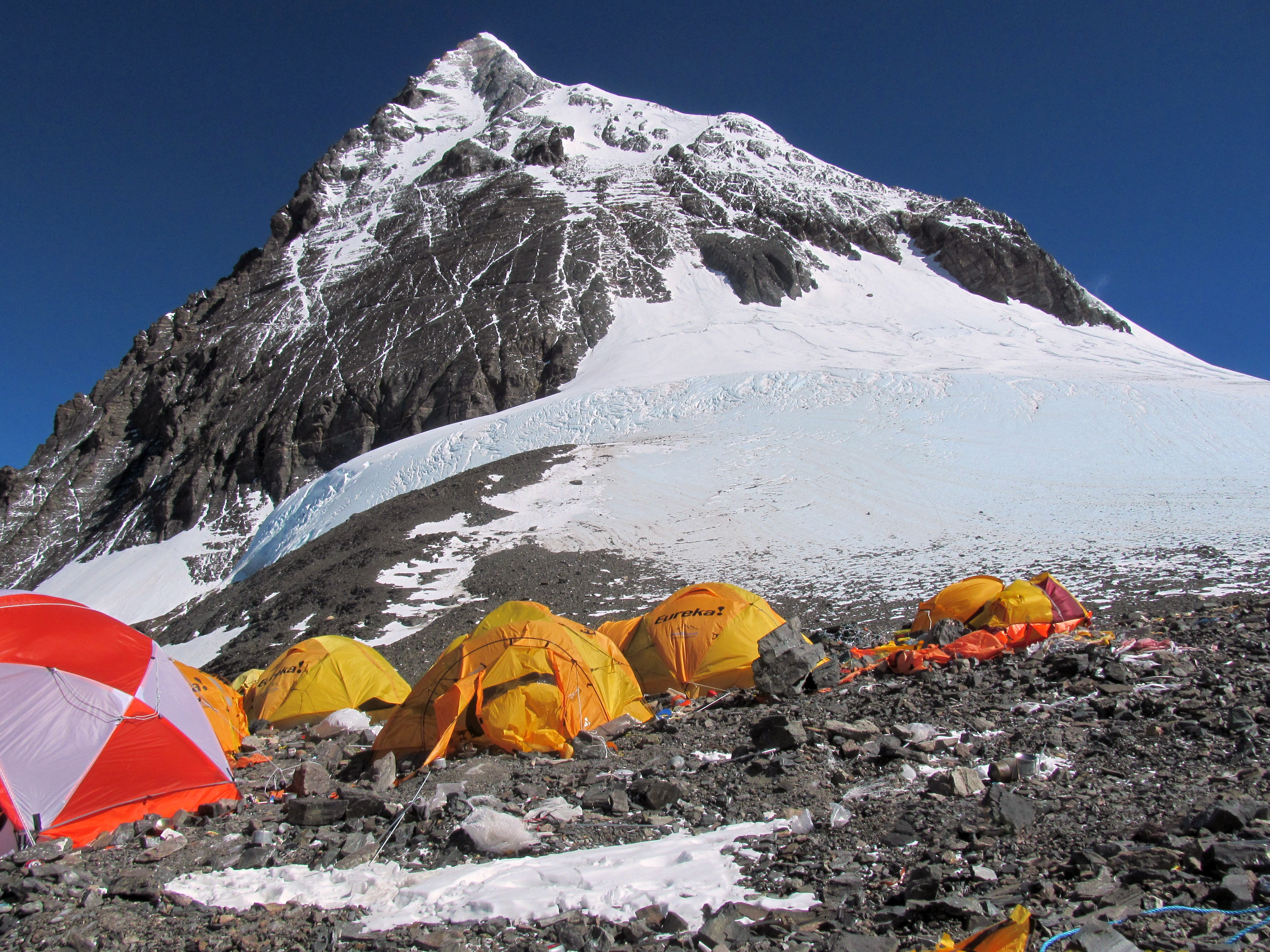
The South Col of Mount Everest, at 7,906 m (25,938 ft) the upper staging point for attempts on its summit.

== See also ==
- Arête – Narrow ridge of rock which separates two valleys
- Saddle (landform)
