= Teufelshorn =

Teufelshorn is the name of several mountains:

- Großes Teufelshorn (2,363 m) and Kleines Teufelshorn (2,283 m) in the Berchtesgaden Alps, see Teufelshörner
- Teufelshorn (3,680 m) in the Central Alpine Glockner Group, see Teufelshorn (Glockner Group)
