= Grossglockner =

Highest mountain in Austria

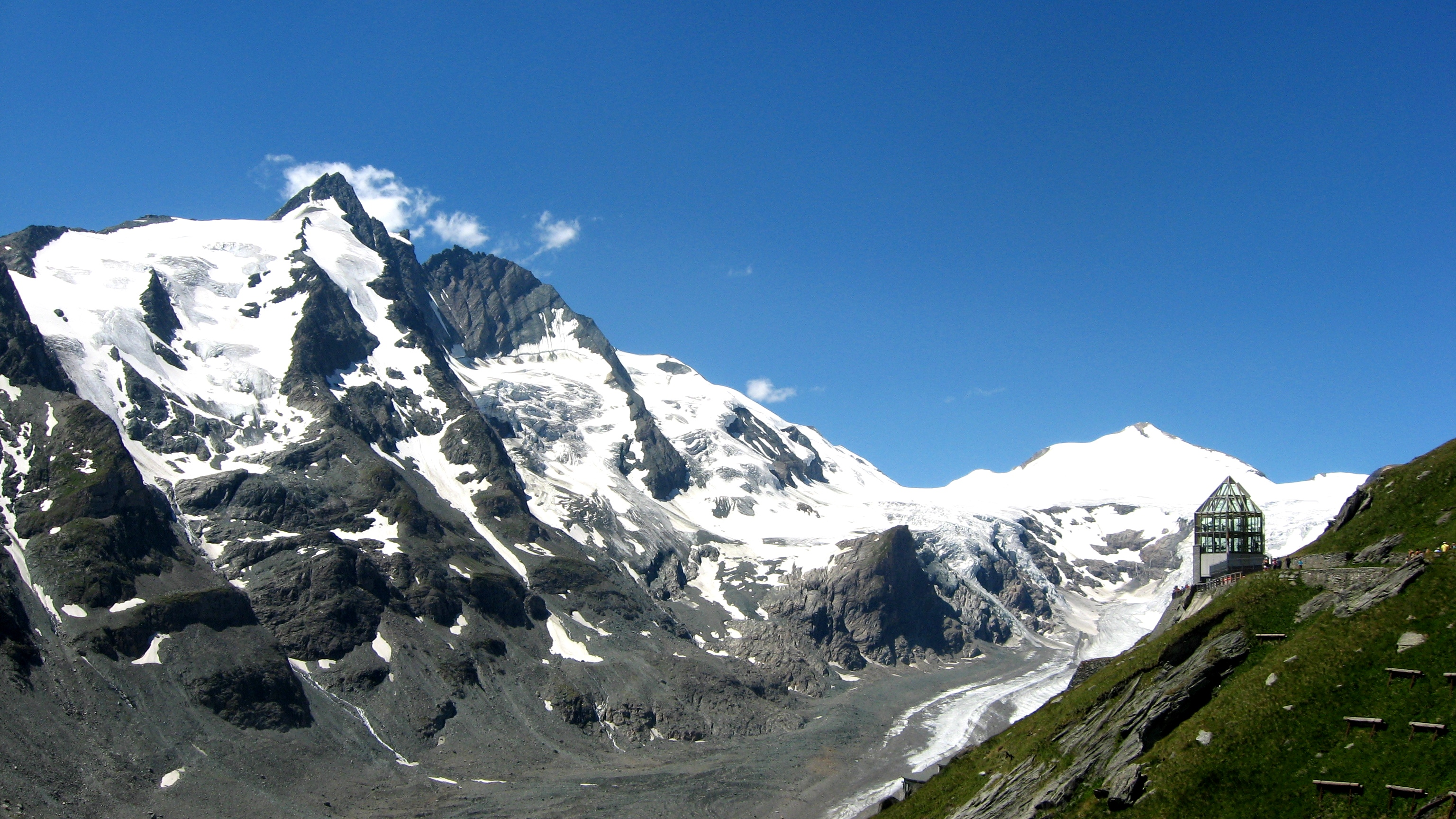
- Großglockner from behind the glass panorama tower

Highest point
- Elevation: 3,798 m (12,461 ft)
- Prominence: 2,423 m (7,949 ft); Ranked 2nd in the Alps
- Listing: Country high point Ultra; Alpine mountains above 3000 m
- Coordinates: 47°04′29.52″N 12°41′42.9″E

Naming
- Pronunciation: Austrian German: [ˌɡroːs ˈɡlɔknɐ]

Geography
- Location within Austria
- Location: Carinthia & East Tyrol, Austria
- Parent range: Hohe Tauern

Climbing
- First ascent: 28 July 1800, by Sepp and Martin Klotz (?), Martin Reicher and two others
- Easiest route: PD, glacier 35°, UIAA II

The Großglockner (German: Großglockner [ˈɡroːsˌɡlɔknɐ]), or just Glockner, is, at 3,798 metres above the Adriatic (12,461 ft), the highest mountain in Austria and highest mountain in the Alps east of the Brenner Pass. It is part of the larger Glockner Group of the Hohe Tauern range, situated along the main ridge of the Central Eastern Alps and the Alpine divide. The Pasterze, Austria's most extended glacier, lies on the Grossglockner's eastern slope.

The characteristic pyramid-shaped peak actually consists of two pinnacles, the Großglockner and the Kleinglockner (3,770 m or 12,370 ft, from German: groß 'big', klein 'small'), separated by the Glocknerscharte col.

== Etymology ==
The name Glocknerer is first documented in a 1561 map designed by the Viennese cartographer Wolfgang Lazius. The denotation Glogger is mentioned in a 1583 description of the Tyrolean Kals legal district, then referring to the whole ridge south of the Alpine main chain. In the 1760s, the Atlas Tyrolensis listed a Glockner Berg, the prefix Gross- ("great") is not mentioned before the first expedition in 1799.

According to the scholar Belsazar Hacquet (1735–1815), Glockner is possibly derived from German: Glocke ("bell"), referring to the mountain's characteristic shape. It may also be a Germanised version of the Alpine Slavic word Klek ("mountain"), as maintained in the Slovene name Veliki Klek.

== Geography ==
=== Location and area ===
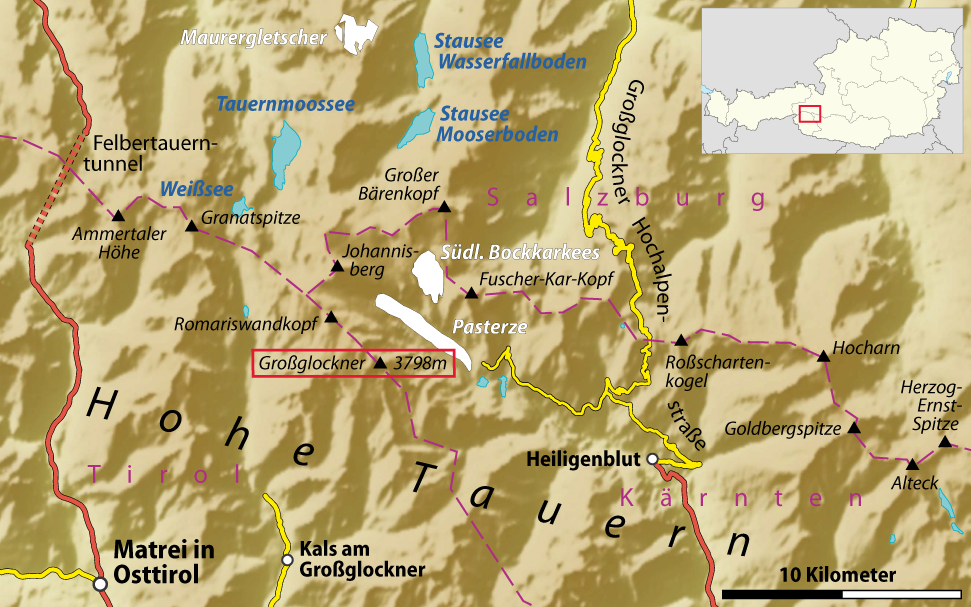
Grossglockner and surrounding area

The Grossglockner lies on the border between the Austrian states of Carinthia and Tyrol (East Tyrol). The peak is part of the Glocknerkamm ridge in the Glockner Group that branches off the main chain of the Alps at Eiskögele, heading in a southeasterly direction and forming the boundary between the East Tyrolean municipality of Kals am Großglockner, about 8 km (5.0 mi) in the southwest at 1,324 m (4,344 ft), and Carinthian Heiligenblut, about 12 km (7.5 mi) in the northeast at 1,291 m (4,236 ft). This boundary is also the watershed between the Kals Valley and its Teischnitz and Ködnitz side valleys on the Tyrolean side and the Möll Valley with the Pasterze glacier on the Carinthian side. The region around the mountain has formed part of the Grossglockner-Pasterze special protected area within the High Tauern National Park since 1986.

The Glockner is the highest mountain in the Alps east of the Ortler range, about 175 km (109 mi) away, and, after Mont Blanc, has the second greatest topographic isolation of all mountains in the Alps. Even its topographic prominence, at 2,424 m (7,953 ft), is the second highest after Mont Blanc in the entire Alps (see the list of Alpine peaks by prominence). That makes it one of the most independent peaks in the Alps. The view from the Grossglockner summit is one of the farthest of all mountains in the Eastern Alps. It ranges out to 220 km (140 mi) or, taking account of atmospheric refraction, almost 240 km (150 mi). Its view over more than 150,000 km^{2} (58,000 mi^{2}) of the Earth's surface reaches as far as the Upper Swabian Plateau in the northwest, to Regensburg and the peaks of the Bohemian Forest in the north, to Ortler in the west, to the Padan Plain in the south, and to Triglav and the Totes Gebirge range in the east.

=== Topography ===
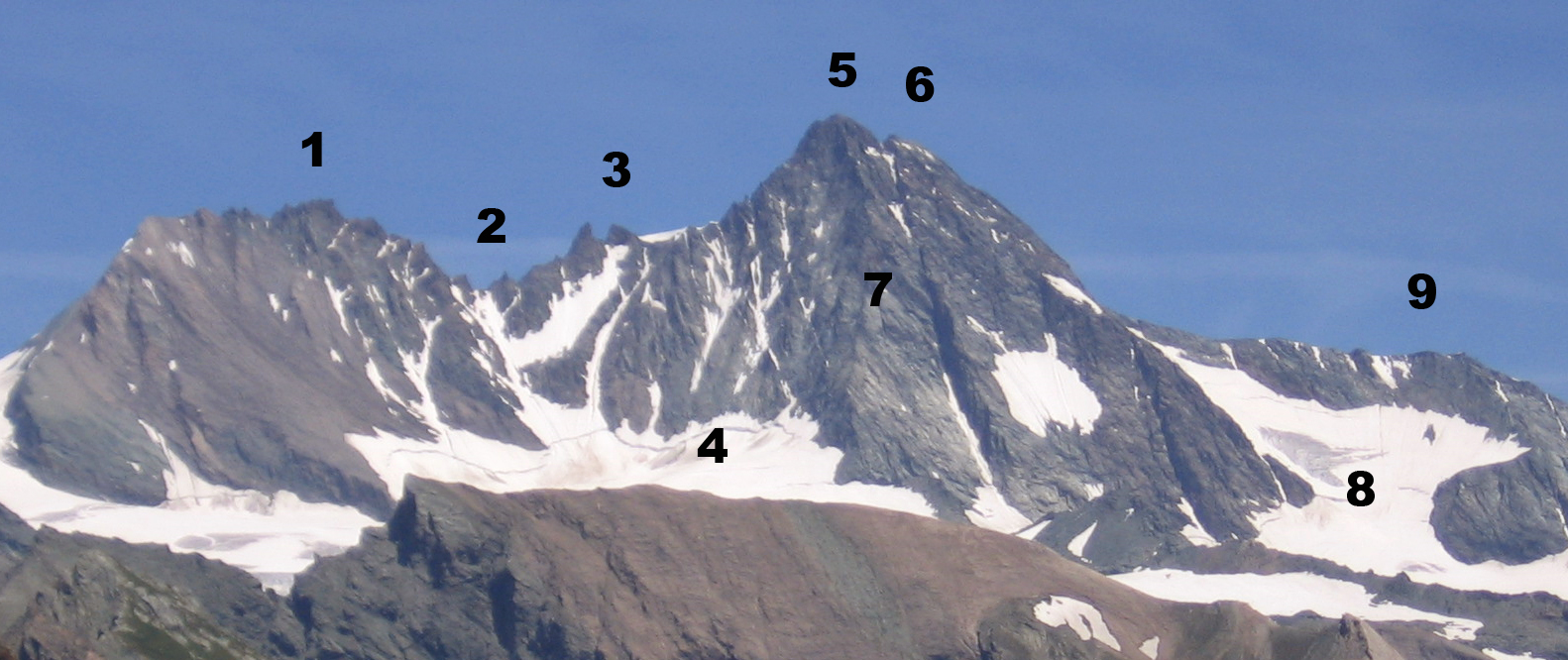
The Grossglockner from the southwest: 1. Glocknerwand, 2. Untere Glocknerscharte, 3. Teufelshorn (left) and Glocknerhorn (right), 4. Teischnitzkees, 5. Grossglockner, 6. Kleinglockner, 7. Stüdlgrat, 8. Ködnitzkees, 9. Adlersruhe

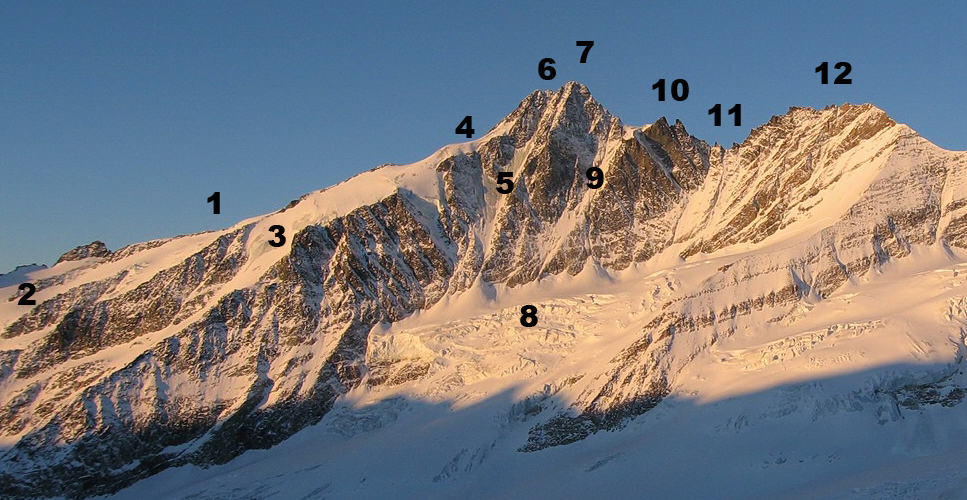
The Grossglockner from the northeast: 1. Adlersruhe, 2. Hofmannskees, 3. Kleinglocknerkees, 4. Glocknerleitl, 5. Pallavicinirinne, 6. Kleinglockner, 7. Grossglockner, 8. Glocknerkees, 9. Berglerrinne, 10. Glocknerhorn (left) and Teufelshorn (right), 11. Untere Glocknerscharte, 12. Glocknerwand

The Grossglockner rock summit, due to its high Alpine, heavily glaciated appearance, is often compared to the mountains of the Western Alps. Together with the Kleinglockner to the southeast it forms a distinctive double peak. There are differing views in the literature as to whether the Kleinglockner is a subpeak or a separate main summit. Due to its low topographic prominence and isolation as well as its close links in climbing history, it is counted as part of that of the Grossglockner in historic publications; however, in view of its separate climbing routes it is counted as an independent peak in mountaineering literature.

The Obere Glocknerscharte between the two peaks, at 3,766 m (12,356 ft), is the highest col in Austria, from which a couloir up to 55° in gradient and 600 m (2,000 ft) in altitude descends down to the Glocknerkees glacier, called Pallavicinirinne after the Austrian mountaineer Alfred von Pallavicini (1848–1886). It runs northeastwards and borders on the Northeast and North Faces of the Grossglockner. The latter faces are bounded by the Northwest Ridge, part of the main Glockner crest, which runs over the Grögerschneid, 3,660 m (12,010 ft), and the ridge elevations of Glocknerhorn, 3,680 m (12,070 ft), and Teufelshorn, 3,677 m (12,064 ft), to the Untere Glocknerscharte, 3,598 m (11,804 ft), which connects to the 3,721 m (12,208 ft) high Glocknerwand.

A prominent ridge, the Stüdlgrat, named after the Prague Alpinist Johann Stüdl (1839–1925), runs from the Grossglockner away to the southwest. Together with its extension, the Luisengrat, it separates the West Face and the Teischnitzkees glacier at its foot from the South Face and its Ködnitzkees glacier. A couloir known as the Pillwaxrinne crosses the South Face below the Obere Glocknerscharte; most of the South Face lies east of this gully below the Kleinglockner. The east side of the Kleinglockner, the Glocknerleitl, is glaciated to just below the summit and is continued by the Kleinglocknerkees and Hofmannskees before reaching the Pasterze.

== History ==
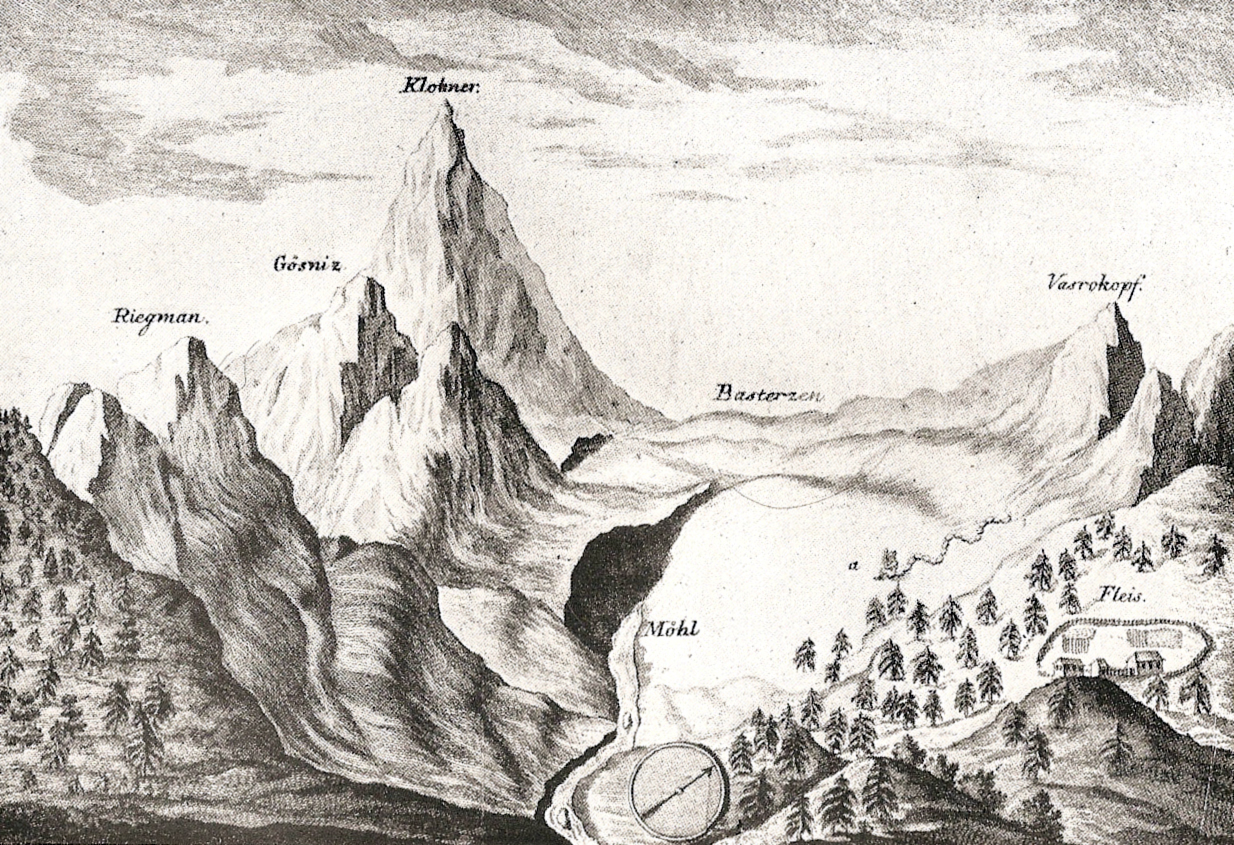
Klokner, 1782 engraving by Belsazar Hacquet

The French-born natural scientist Belsazar Hacquet, from 1773 professor of anatomy at the Academy of Ljubljana, travelled the Eastern Alps from 1779 to 1781 and published an itinerary in 1783, describing the Glokner mountain and stating that it had not been climbed yet. He estimated the mountain's height as 3,793 m (12,444 ft), and created an engraving illustrating Grossglockner and Pasterze, the first known depiction of the mountain.

=== First ascent ===
Inspired by Hacquet's book and by the first ascent of the Mont Blanc in 1786, the Gurk prince-bishop Count Franz Xaver of Salm (1749–1822) together with his vicar general Sigismund Ernst Hohenwart (1745–1825) and Baron Franz Xaver von Wulfen (1728–1805) started efforts for a Grossglockner expedition. They engaged two peasants from Heiligenblut as mountain guides to do the first explorations for an ascent through the Leitertal valley, which is the side of Grossglockner with the least ice (people feared glaciers in these times). These valiant men, called "Glockners" in the records, did more than they were ordered to do—and probably reached the Kleinglockner summit on 23 July 1799.

One month later the bishop's expedition started: a mountain hut (the first Salm Hut) had been built and the path in the Leitertal valley was prepared so that the bishop could use a horse to reach it. 30 people, among them Salm, Hohenwart and Wulfen, were part of the expedition. They suffered with bad weather and their first effort failed, but on 25 August 1799 Hohenwart and at least four other people, including the two "Glockners", reached—again—the Kleinglockner, where they installed one of the first summit crosses (one of the main goals of the church expedition). Hohenwart's reports did not tell clearly that they had not touched the highest point but Bishop Salm (who had reached the Adlersruhe rock at 3,454 m (11,332 ft)) was informed. Dissatisfied, he invited another, even bigger expedition the next year.

On 28 July 1800, 62 people, among them the pedagogue Franz Michael Vierthaler and the botanist David Heinrich Hoppe, started again into the Leitertal valley. Four peasants and carpenters (the "Glockners" and two others who are not known) did a track in the snow, had installed fixed ropes at some steeper sections up to the end of the Glocknerleitl, and even built a second refuge, called Hohenwarte Hut. The vanguard reached the Kleinglockner peak, however, according to the expedition records by the Dellach priest Franz Joseph Horasch (Orasch), only the four guides and Mathias Hautzendorfer, the local priest of the Rangersdorf parish, were able to cross the Obere Glocknerscharte and climb the Grossglockner summit. Hautzendorfer had to be persuaded to venture the step and administered the last rites in advance.

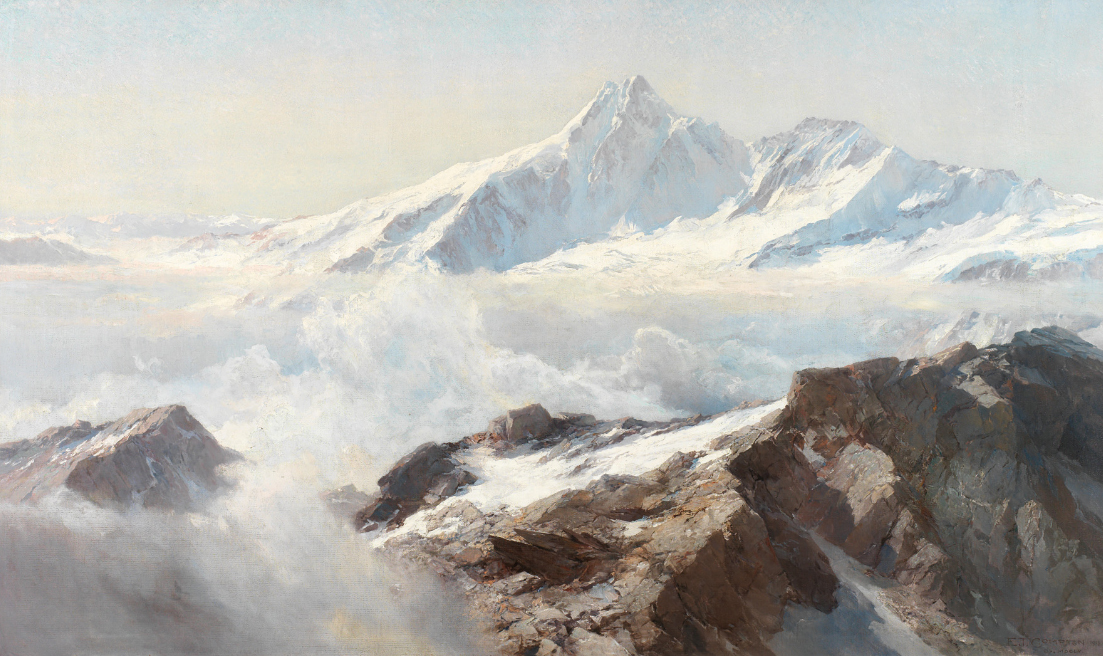
Grossglockner, 1918 painting by Edward Theodore Compton

The two "Glockners" are usually identified as the brothers Joseph (Sepp) and Martin Klotz, however, this surname is not listed in the Heiligenblut parish register. A local peasant named Sepp Hoysen is documented as a member of the second Grossglockner expedition in 1802, and the surveyor Ulrich Schiegg mentioned one Martin Reicher as "Glockner" guide. The peasants and several other members of the expedition (among them Schiegg and his young apprentice Valentin Stanič, who climbed Mt. Watzmann for the first time some weeks later) did the ascent again the next day and finally installed the summit cross and a barometer on the Grossglockner summit.

=== Development ===
Bishop Salm undertook two more ascents in 1802 (with Hohenwart reaching the summit) and in 1806, however, he himself never climbed beyond the Adlersruhe rock. The climbing of the Grossglockner was also described by the botanist Josef August Schultes, who explored the massif together with Count Apponyi in 1802. No further ascents were made during the Napoleonic Wars, the huts decayed and were plundered by locals. In the following Vormärz era, however, the mountain became a popular venue for Alpinists like Hermann and Adolf Schlagintweit, who all followed the route of the first ascent.

By the mid 19th century, the developing Alpine tourism began to alter the traditional agriculture economy in the Heiligenblut area. Therefore, the people of Kals tried to lay out a straight ascent from the western side, which however was not reached until Julius von Payer explored the ridge between Glöcknerleitl and Ködnitzkees in 1863. Johann Stüdl had a via ferrata erected along the southwestern ridge the next year and the Stüdlhütte erected at its foot in 1868. Already in 1869, most expeditions to the summit started in Kals. The first winter ascent of the Grossglockner was made on January 2, 1875 by William Adolf Baillie Grohman, a member of the Alpine Club. In 1876 Count Pallavicini and his guide Hans Tribusser undertook the first expedition up the steep glaciated Northeast Face, chopping 2,500 steps into the Pallavicinirinne in an ice climbing master stroke not repeated for 23 years.

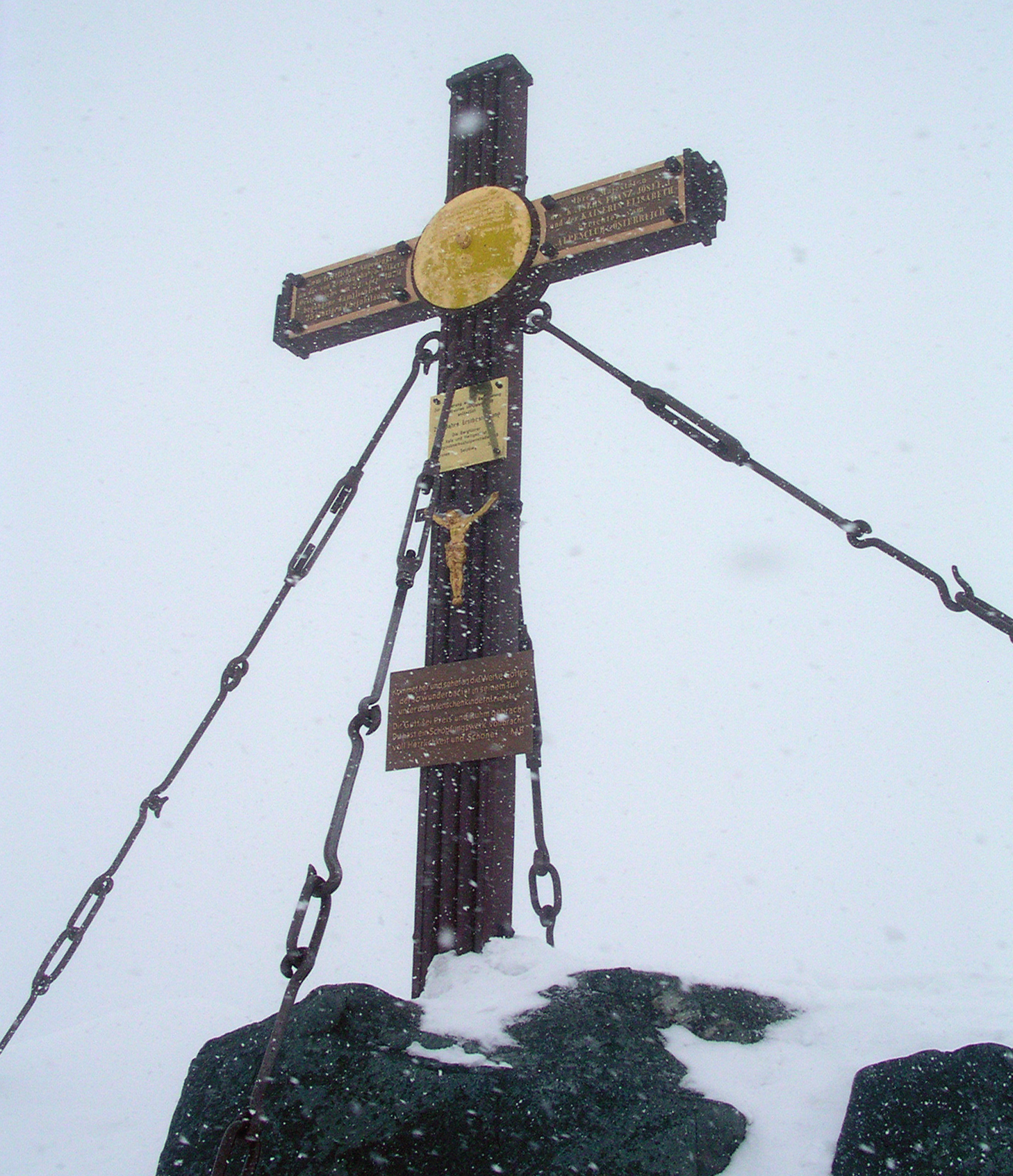
Großglockner summit cross, 2006 condition

In 1879 Count Pallavicini dedicated a new iron summit cross on the occasion of the silver wedding of Emperor Franz Joseph of Austria and Empress Elisabeth; both had visited Heiligenblut and walked to the present-day Franz-Josefs-Höhe viewpoint in 1865. The cross was installed on 2 October 1880. Pallavicini also had the Archduke John Hut erected at the former Adlersruhe resting place of Bishop Salm, today the highest situated mountain hut in Austria. The Austrian Alpine Club built the new Salmhütte and the Glocknerhaus along the alpine route from Heiligenblut.

A first ascent by skiing was made in 1909 and the circumnavigation of the massif soon became a popular ski mountaineering tour. The Grossglockner became Austria's highest mountain, when the South Tyrolean Ortler region had to be ceded to the Kingdom of Italy according to the 1919 Treaty of Saint-Germain, which promoted its reputation as a tourist attraction.

=== Incidents ===
In 2026, Thomas Plamberger was convicted of leaving his girlfriend Kerstin Gurtner near the summit of the Grossglockner, where she died from hypothermia.

== High Alpine Road ==
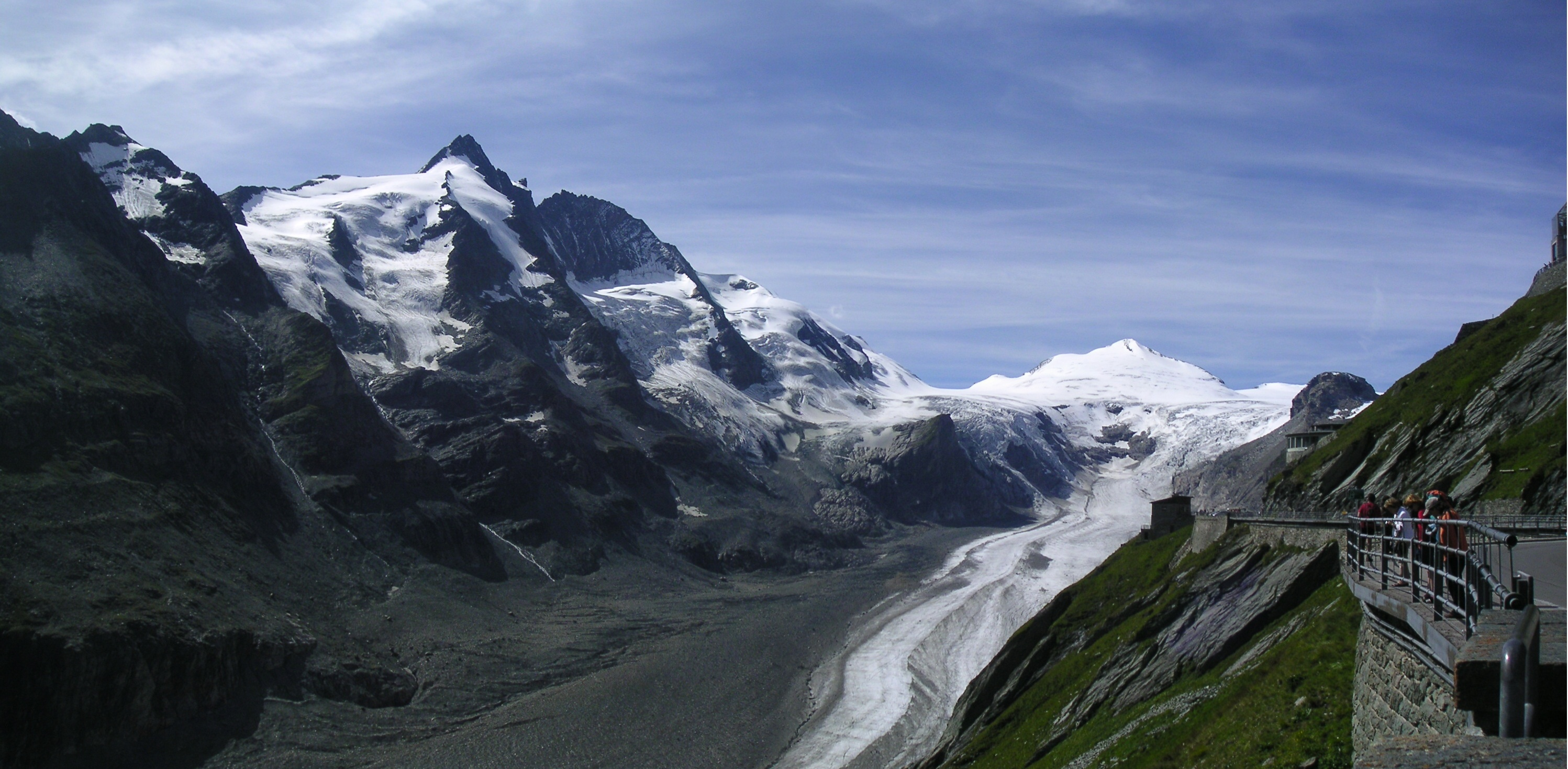
Grossglockner and Pasterze, view from Franz-Josefs-Höhe

Mass tourism was decisively promoted by the scenic High Alpine Road (Großglockner-Hochalpenstraße) running from Heiligenblut to Bruck in Salzburg with a branch-off to the Franz-Josefs-Höhe viewpoint. It was built across the historic Hochtor Pass of the Alpine divide between 1930 and 1935 according to plans designed by engineer Franz Wallack. The pass road, Austria's highest, reaches 2,576 m (8,451 ft), and is one of the most popular tourist attractions in the country (second after Schönbrunn Palace) with about 270,000 vehicles and 900,000 visitors every year, about 50 million since its opening.

Also famous for its historic vehicle hill climb races.

== See also ==
- List of the highest mountains in Austria
