= Kals am Großglockner =

- Municipality
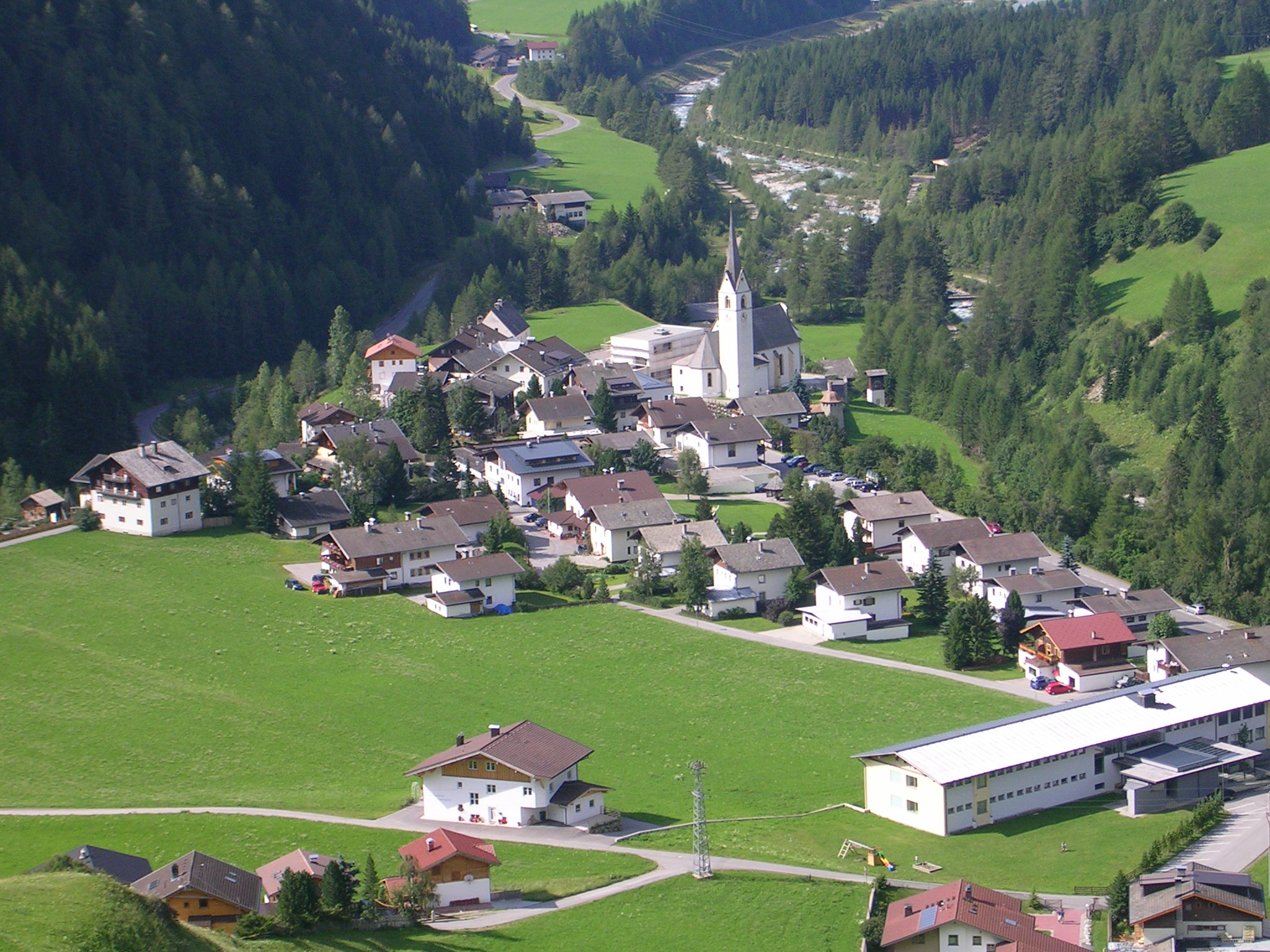

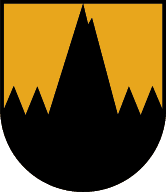
- Coat of arms

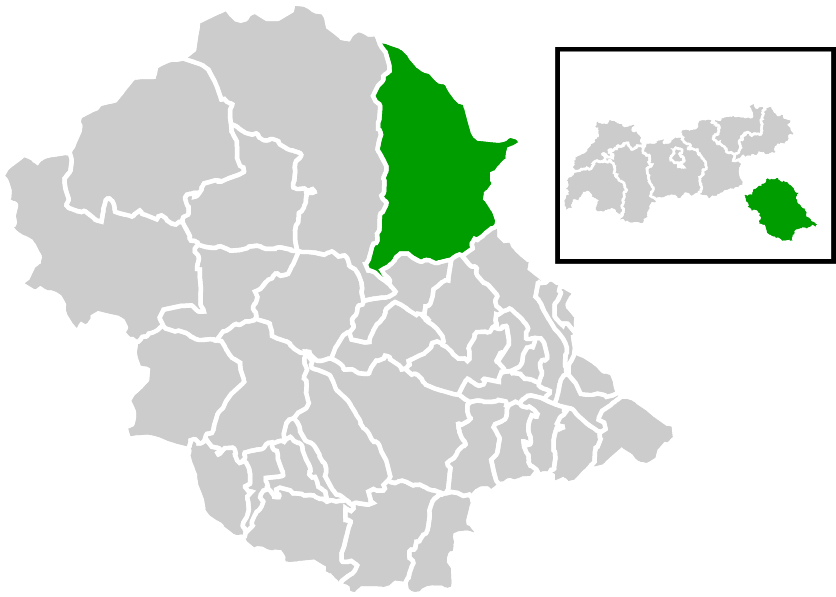
- Location within Lienz district

- Location within Austria
- Coordinates: 47°00′13″N 12°38′41″E
- Country: Austria
- State: Tyrol
- District: Lienz

Government
  - Mayor: Nikolaus Unterweger

Area
  - Total: 180.54 km^{2} (69.71 sq mi)
- Elevation: 1,324 m (4,344 ft)

Population (2018-01-01)
  - Total: 1,142
  - Density: 6.325/km^{2} (16.38/sq mi)
- Time zone: UTC+1 (CET)
  - Summer (DST): UTC+2 (CEST)
- Postal code: 9981
- Area code: 04876
- Vehicle registration: LZ
- Website: www.kals.at

Kals am Großglockner is a municipality in the district of Lienz in the exclave of East Tirol in the Austrian state of Tyrol.

== Geography ==
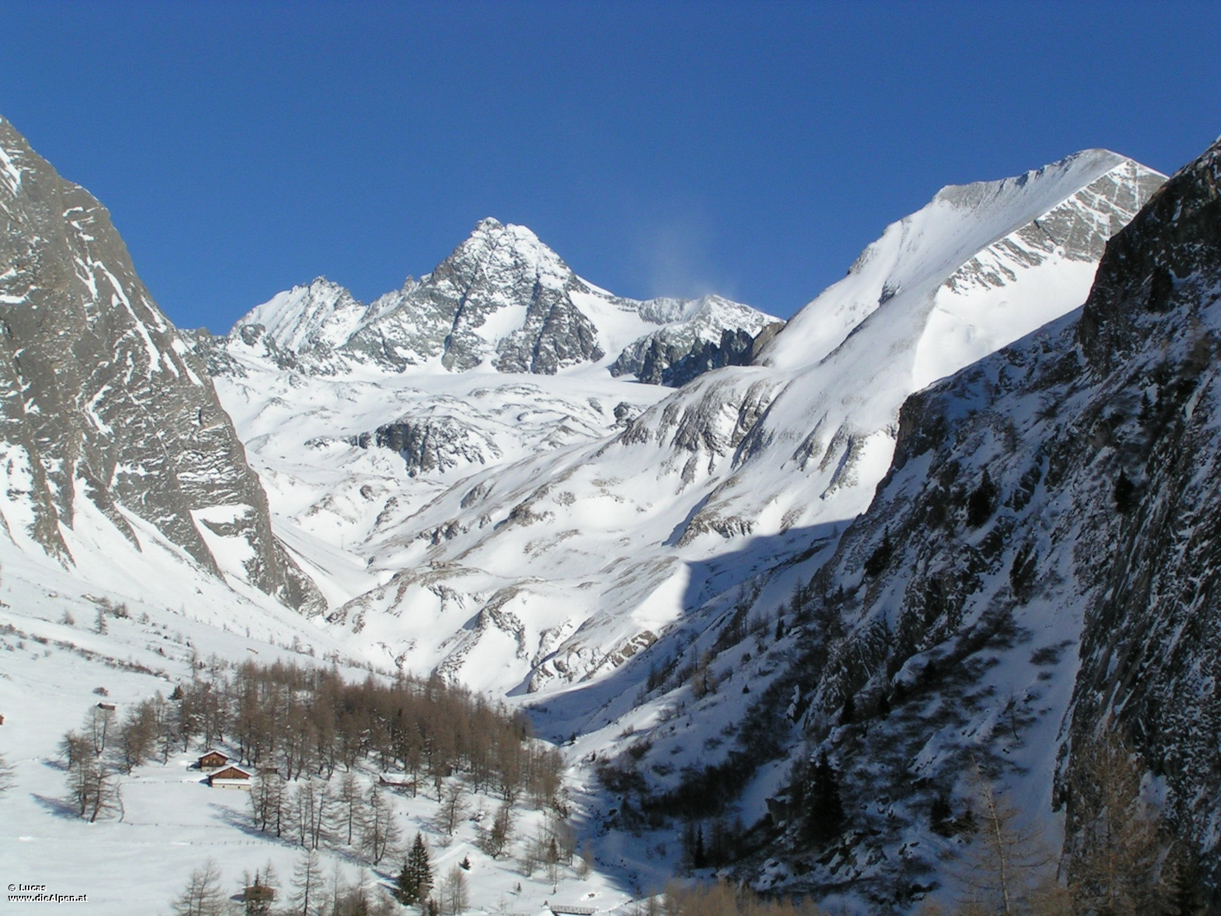
Großglockner

Kals is located in northern East Tirol, near the border to Salzburg and Carinthia. Located in the valleys of Kalser and Iseltals on the Kalserbach river, Kals is dominated by mountains, and the famous Großglockner mountain, the tallest mountain in all of Austria, is located partly in the municipality. Most of Kals is rugged and unusable (41.1%), with forests also prominent. Only 0.1% of the land is fields and pastures.

=== Municipal arrangement ===
Kals is divided into the following Katastralgemeinden: Unterpeischlach, Oberpeischlach, Staniska, Arnig, Lesach, Lana, Ködnitz, Glor-Berg, Großdorf, Unterburg, and Burg.

== History ==
The Kalser valley might have been settled before the Paleolithic Age. Kals was first mentioned on 19 August 1197. A large copper mine was begun in the 16th century here. Kals was the starting point for the first ascent of Großglockner in 1853.

== Population ==
Historical population
Year	Pop.	±%
1869	1,070	—
1880	1,043	−2.5%
1890	1,073	+2.9%
1900	1,045	−2.6%
1910	959	−8.2%
1923	920	−4.1%
1934	991	+7.7%
1939	943	−4.8%
1951	1,082	+14.7%
1961	1,239	+14.5%
1971	1,368	+10.4%
1981	1,350	−1.3%
1991	1,272	−5.8%
2001	1,338	+5.2%
2011	1,273	−4.9%

== Sights ==
- Church in Ködnitz built in 1439, with Classicist alterations made between 1818 and 1821.
- Church in Großdorf with a two-storeyed chapel and a Gothic spire

== Economy ==
Kals is a large tourist center, with an average of about 100,000 visits in the summer. Of course, due to its high altitude it is also a skiing resort.

== Politics ==
=== Twin cities ===
- Marling, Italy
