= Östliche Marzellspitze =

Mountain in Italy

Marzellspitze
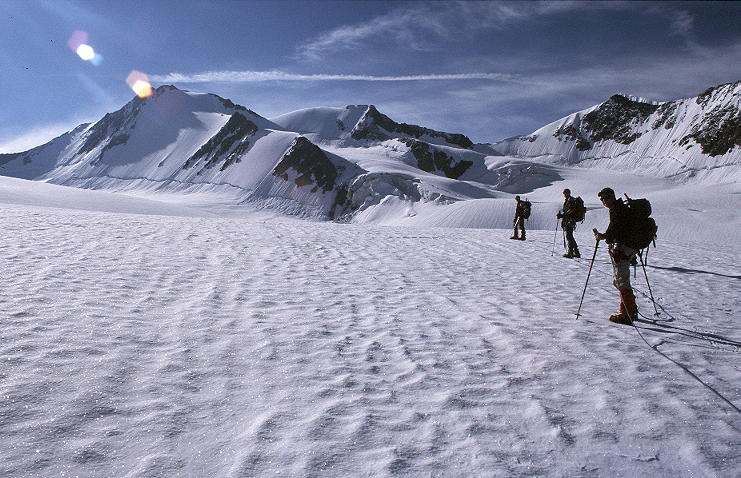

Highest point
- Elevation: 3,555 m (11,663 ft)
- Coordinates: 46°46′18″N 10°54′35″E

Geography
- Location: Tyrol, Austria / South Tyrol, Italy
- Parent range: Ötztal Alps

Climbing
- First ascent: 24 July 1872 by Hans Pinggera and V. Hecht

The Östliche Marzellspitze is a mountain in the Ötztal Alps on the border between Tyrol, Austria, and South Tyrol, Italy.
