= Teufelshorn (Glockner Group) =

Teufelshorn and Glocknerhorn
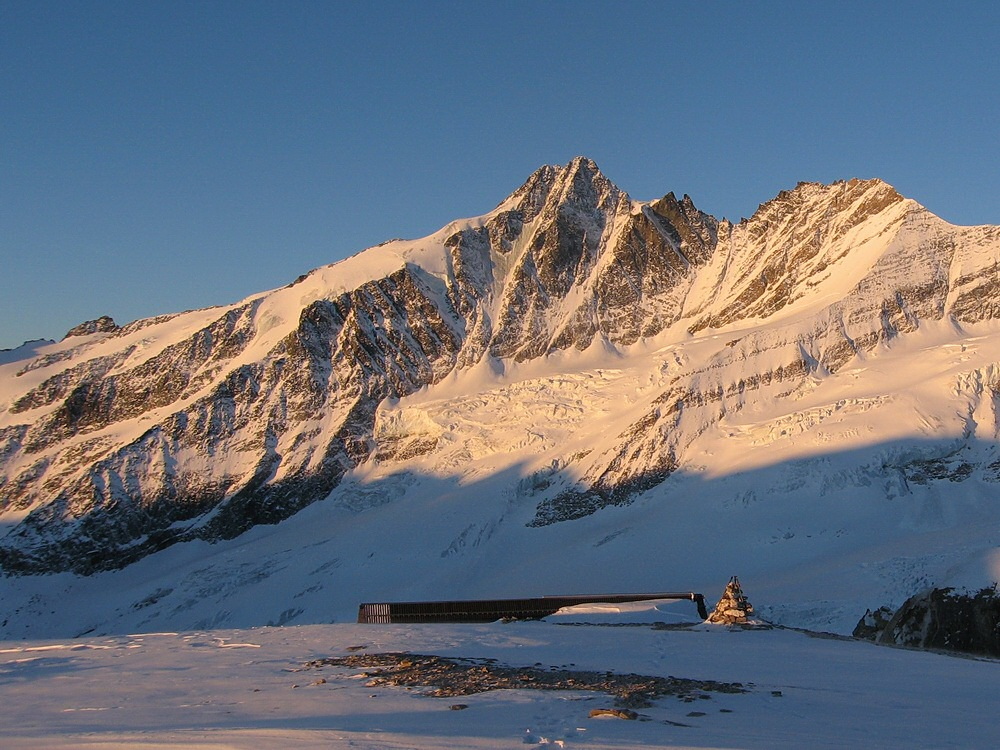
- Großglockner (left), Glocknerwand (right), in the centre: the Glocknerhorn and Teufelshorn

Highest point
- Elevation: 3,680 m (AA) (12,070 ft)
- Coordinates: 47°04′34″N 12°41′30″E

Geography
- Location within Austria
- Location: border between Carinthia and East Tyrol, Austria
- Parent range: Austrian Central Alps, High Tauern, Glockner Group

Climbing
- First ascent: 8 August 1884 by Moriz von Kuffner, guided by Christian Ranggetiner and E. Rubesoier (Teufelshorn) and 29 August 1879 by Gustav Gröger and Christian Ranggetiner (Glocknerhorn)
- Easiest route: Trail from the Stüdl Hut over the Teischnitzkees and the Untere Glocknerscharte or the Grögerschneide

The Glocknerhorn and Teufelshorn are two nearby mountain peaks in the Glockner Group in the Austrian Central Alps in the central part of the High Tauern. According to the literature, Teufelshorn is 3,677 metres high. The Austrian Federal Office for Metrology and Survey gives Glocknerhorn's elevation as 3,680 metres, but naming it "Teufelshorn" by mistake. Both lie on the Northwest Ridge (Nordwestgrat) of Austria's highest peak, the neighbouring Großglockner, along which the border between the Austrian federal states of Tyrol (East Tyrol) and Carinthia runs. The lower Teufelshorn in the west has a turret-like summit that juts about 30 metres above the massif itself and, together with the higher and similar-looking Glocknerhorn in the east, forms a twin peak. The Teufelshorn was first climbed on 8 August 1884 by Moriz von Kuffner, guided by Christian Ranggetiner and E. Rubesoier. The 3,680-metre-high (12,070 ft) Glocknerhorn, by contrast, had already been conquered on 29 August 1879 by the Alpinists, Gustav Gröger and Christian Ranggetiner.

== Sources and maps ==
- Willi End: Glocknergruppe Alpine Club Guide, Bergverlag Rother, Munich, 2003, ISBN 3-7633-1266-8
- Eduard Richter: Die Erschliessung der Ostalpen, III. Band, Verlag des Deutschen und Oesterreichischen Alpenvereins, Berlin 1894
- Alpine Club map 1:25.000, Bheet 40, Glocknergruppe
