= Sigismund Ernst Hohenwart =

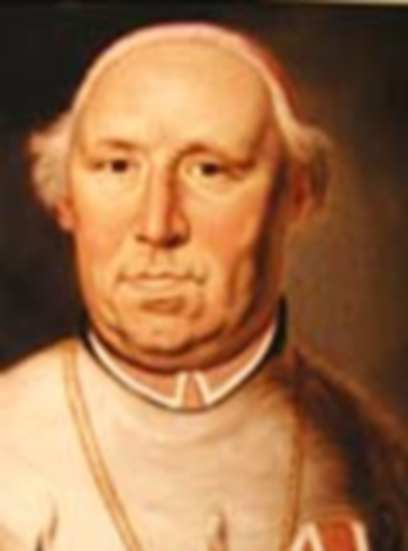
Sigismund Ernst Hohenwart, bishop of Linz (1809–1825)

Sigismund Ernst Hohenwart (1745–1825) was the third bishop of Linz from 1809 to 1825.

He had been a cathedral canon of Gurk and Vicar-General of Klagenfurt. He was appointed by the emperor on 10 January 1809, but the appointment did not receive papal approbation until December, 1814, on account of the imprisonment of the pope.

Hohenwart took energetic measures against the visionary followers of Thomas Pöschl and Martin Boos, who were then numerous in Upper Austria.
