= Glocknerwand =

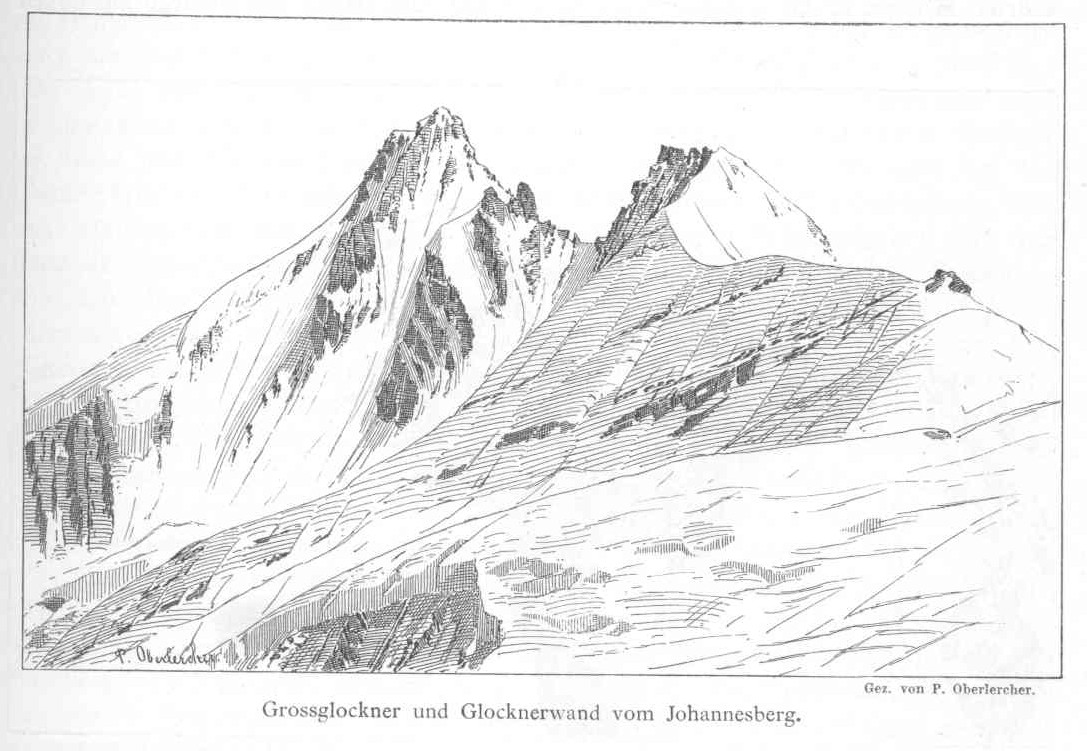
- Left: the Großglockner, right: the Glocknerwand, from the northwest

Highest point
- Elevation: 3,721 m (AA) (12,208 ft)
- Prominence: 125 m ↓ Untere Glocknerscharte
- Isolation: 0.789 km → Großglockner
- Coordinates: 47°04′47″N 12°41′11″E

Geography
- Location within Austria
- Location: Border between Carinthia and East Tyrol, Austria
- Parent range: Austrian Central Alps, Hohe Tauern, Glockner Group

Climbing
- First ascent: 3 September 1872 by Josef Pöschl guided by Josef Kerer and Peter Groder
- Easiest route: from the Stüdl Hut over the Teischnitzkees and the Südflanke to the summit of the Hofmannspitze

The Glocknerwand (German pronunciation: [ˈɡlɔknɐˌvant]) is a mountain in the Glockner Group in the Austrian Central Alps in the central region of the High Tauern. According to the literature it is 3,721 metres high, but the Austrian Federal Office for Metrology and Survey gives its height as 3,722 metres. It is separated from Austria's highest peak, the neighbouring Großglockner, by the col known as the Untere Glocknerscharte (3596 m). The mountain lies on the boundary between East Tyrol and Carinthia.

The Glocknerwand is a massive, fan-shaped mountain, that has very steep, over 400-metre-high (1,300 ft) rock faces to the southwest and northeast. The summit region is covered with thick snowdrifts, that make its ascent dangerous and unpredictable. The towers of the Glocknerwand are therefore considered the most difficult summits to climb in the entire Glockner Group.

== Sources and maps ==
- Willi End: Glocknergruppe Alpine Club Guide, Bergverlag Rother, Munich, 2003, ISBN 3-7633-1266-8
- Eduard Richter: Die Erschließung der Ostalpen, III. Band, Verlag des Deutschen und Oesterreichischen Alpenvereins, Berlin 1894
- Alpine Club Map 1:25.000, Sheet 40, Glocknergruppe
