= Kleinglockner =

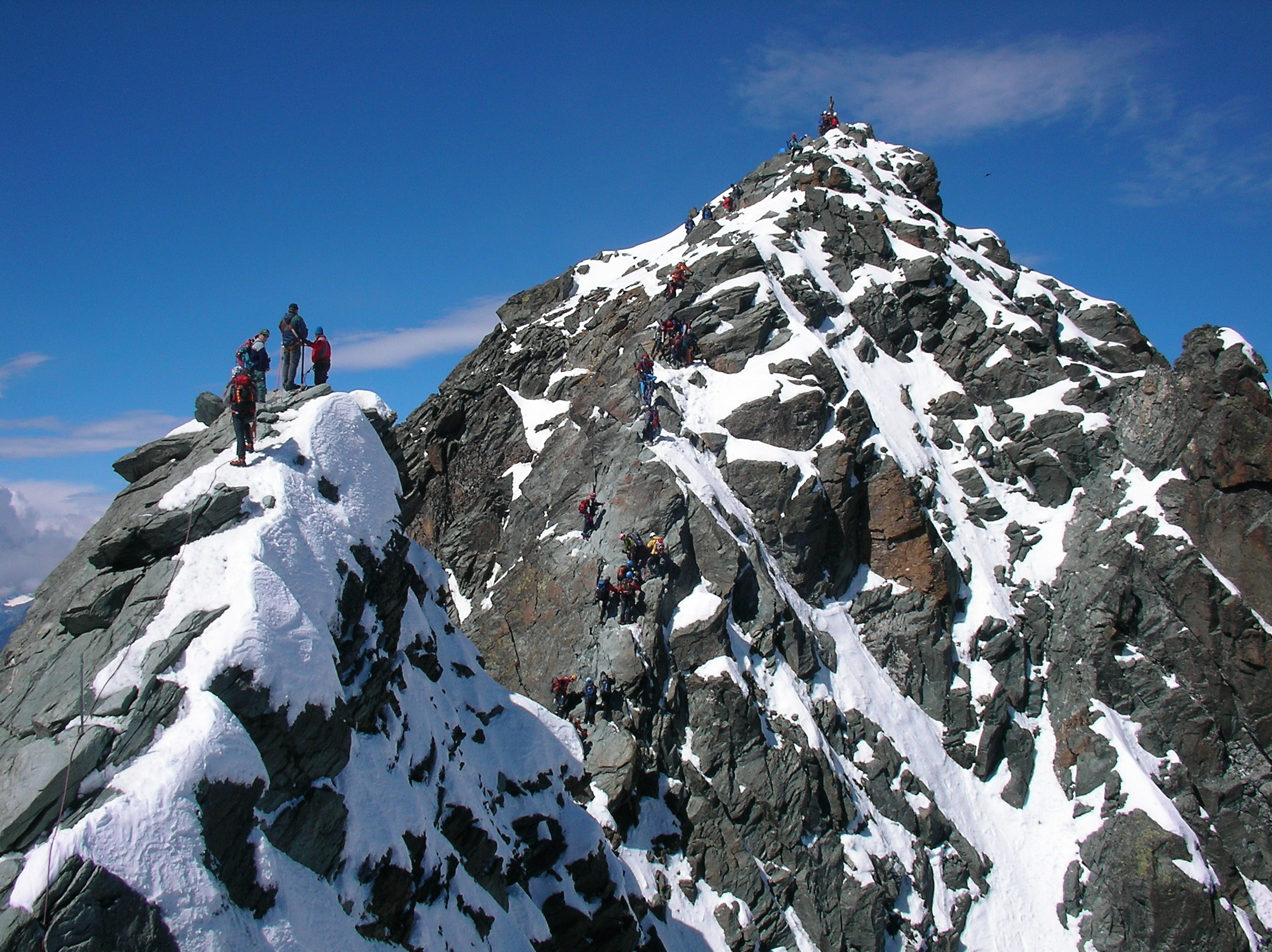
- Kleinglockner (left), with the Großglockner behind

Highest point
- Elevation: 3,770 m (AA) (12,370 ft)
- Prominence: 17 m ↓ Upper Glockner gap
- Isolation: 0.08 km → Großglockner
- Coordinates: 47°04′26″N 12°41′46″E

Geography
- Location within Austria
- Location: Border between Carinthia and East Tyrol, Austria
- Parent range: Austrian Central Alps, Hohe Tauern, Glockner Group

Climbing
- First ascent: 25. August 1799 by Martin and Sepp Klotz, Sigmund von Hohenwart, Johann Zopoth and two carpenters
- Normal route: from the southeast via the Glockner crest (Glocknerkamm)

At the height of 3,770 metres (12,370 ft) the Kleinglockner is the third highest mountain summit in Austria. However, with a prominence of only 17 metres it is arguable whether it can be counted as an independent mountain, or just as a subpeak of the Großglockner. It lies in the Glockner Group of Austria's Central Alps, the middle section of the Hohe Tauern. Geographically and geologically speaking, it is viewed a secondary summit of the neighbouring Großglockner, but in the literature, in view of its importance to mountaineering, it is in some cases treated as separate. Its peak forms part of the Glockner crest or ridge (Glocknerkamm) and lies exactly on the border between the Austrian state of Carinthia and Lienz District in the East Tyrol. The Kleinglockner has the shape of a sharp edge, covered with the so-called Glockner Cornice (Glocknerwechte) and, depending on the conditions, can make the ascent of the mountain dangerous to almost impossible. The climbing history of the Kleinglockner is closely linked to that of the Großglockner, because the first climbers, coming from the south and east, had to cross it.

== Sources ==
- Willi End: Alpine Club Guide Glocknergruppe. Bergverlag Rother, Munich 2003, ISBN 3-7633-1266-8.
- Eduard Richter (Redaktion): Die Erschließung der Ostalpen, III. Band. Published by the German and Austrian Alpine Club, Berlin 1894.
- Raimund von Klebelsberg: Geologie von Tirol. Berlin 1935.
- Alpenvereinskarte 1:25.000, Blatt 40, Glocknergruppe.
