= Wangenitzsee Hut =

Mountain hut in Carinthia, Austria

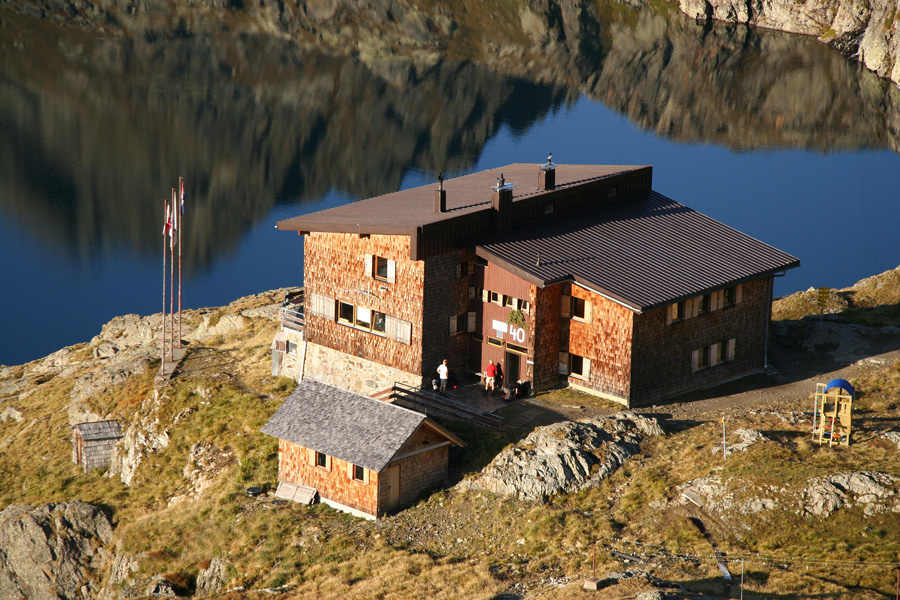
- The Wangenitzsee Hut with the Wangenitzsee in the background
- Interactive map of the Wangenitzsee Hut area

General information
- Location: Directly on the Wangenitzsee
- Coordinates: 46°55′49″N 12°48′0″E
- Elevation: 2,508 m (8,228 ft)
- Year built: 1927
- Owner: Austrian Alpine Club, Lienz Section

Website
- www.wangenitzseehuette.at

The Wangenitzsee Hut (German: Wangenitzseehütte) is a mountain hut in Hohe Tauern National Park, in Carinthia, Austria. It is situated directly on the Wangenitzsee, the largest lake of the Schober group of the Eastern Alps. At an altitude of 2,508 metres (8,228 ft) above sea level (AA), it is the highest hut in the Schober group. Depending on the weather, it opens in the middle of June and closes at the end of September. It is located on the Wiener Höhenweg, and is supplied by a material ropeway from the Debanttal.

== History ==
The first hut was built by the Moravia/Brno section of the German Alpine Club (German: Deutscher Alpenverein (DAV)) in 1927, but it was looted and burned down in 1947. In 1966, a new, larger building was opened. This building was a club hut of the Royal Dutch Climbing and Mountaineering Club (Dutch: Koninklijke Nederlandse Klim- en Bergsport Vereniging (NKBV)) until 2009, when the Lienz Section of the Austrian Alpine Club (German: Österreichischer Alpenverein (ÖAV)) took over.

== Approaches ==
- Drive from Lienz, East Tyrol to Nußdorf-Debant, then take the freight route in the Debanttal to the parking ground Seichenbrunn, at 1,686 metres (5,531 ft) above sea level (AA). From the parking lot, hike to the right over the Debantbach and up the well-marked ascent to the Lower Seescharte, at 2,529 metres (8,297 ft) above sea level, and finally between the Kreuzsee and Wangenitzsee to the Wangenitzsee Hut. Walking time of approximately two and a half hours.
- Drive from Lienz over the Iselsberg Pass to the Raneralm parking ground. From there, hike on the Wiener Höhenweg no. 918 to the Higher Seescharte, at 2,604 metres (8,543 ft) above sea level. Finally, make the short descent to the Wangenitzsee Hut. Walking time of approximately three and a half hours.
- Drive from Carinthia in the Möll valley to Mörtschach, and then through the Wangenitz Valley to the Wangenitzalm parking ground. From there, hike on trail no. 928 to the Wangenitzsee Hut. Ascent time of approximately three and a half hours.

== Nearby summits ==
- Petzeck – 3,283 metres (10,771 ft) above sea level; walking time two and a half hours
- Hoher Perschitzkopf – 3,125 metres (10,253 ft) above sea level
- Kruckelkopf – 3,181 metres (10,436 ft) above sea level
- Georgskopf – 3,090 metres (10,140 ft) above sea level

== Nearby huts ==
- Lienzer Hut – Lower Seescharte; walking time 2.5 hours
- Adolf Noßberger Hut – over the Kreuzseescharte and the Lower and Higher Gradenscharte; walking time 3.5 hours
- Winklerner Hut
