= Roter Knopf =

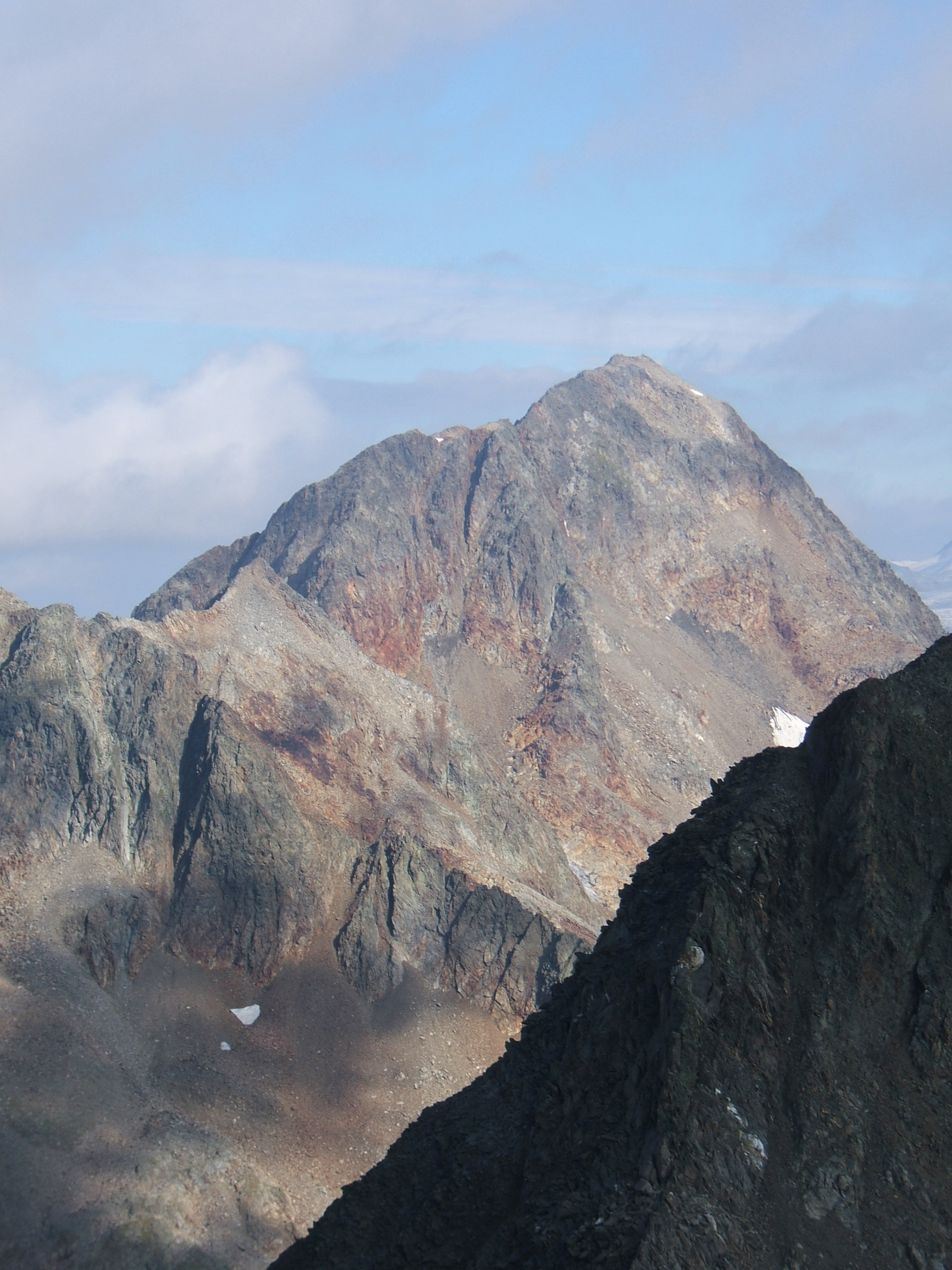
- The Roter Knopf from the Keeskopf to the southeast

Highest point
- Elevation: 3,281 m (AA) (10,764 ft)
- Prominence: 549 m ↓ Gößnitzscharte
- Isolation: 5.98 km → Petzeck
- Listing: Alpine mountains above 3000 m
- Coordinates: 46°58′44″N 12°44′21″E

Geography
- Location within Austria
- Location: Border of East Tyrol / Carinthia, Austria
- Parent range: High Tauern, Schober Group

Climbing
- First ascent: 1872 by J. Pöschl with K. Gorgasser and P. Groder
- Normal route: Waymarked ascent along the southeastern arête (grade I)

The Rote Knopf (3,281 m (AA)) is the second highest mountain in the Schober Group within the High Tauern in the Austrian Alps. It is only two metres short of the Petzeck, the highest summit in the Schober. Nevertheless, this peak is far less well known that the Hochschober or the Glödis. This is probably because the mountain is not visible from the valleys of the Kalser Tal or the anterior Debanttal.

The easiest ascent runs from the Elberfelder Hut following the waymarking southwards before turning west and running along the southeastern arête to the summit. This climb not only requires sure-footedness, but also exposed, albeit not difficult, climbing at grade I. From the summit, Austria's highest mountain, the Großglockner, may be seen prominently to the north.

== Literature and maps ==
- Alpine Club map, Sheet 41, 1:25,000 series, Schobergruppe, ISBN 3-928777-12-2
- Richard Goedeke: 3000er in den Nordalpen, Bruckmann, Munich, 2004, ISBN 3-7654-3930-4
- Geord Zlöbl: Die Dreitausender Osttirols im Nationalpark Hohe Tauern, Verlag Grafik Zloebl, 2005, ISBN 3-200-00428-2
