= Hochschorner =

Hochschorner is a surname. Notable people with the surname include:

- Pavol Hochschorner (born 1979), Slovak slalom canoeist
- Peter Hochschorner (born 1979), Slovak slalom canoeist

== See also ==
- Hochschober
