= Elberfelder Hut =

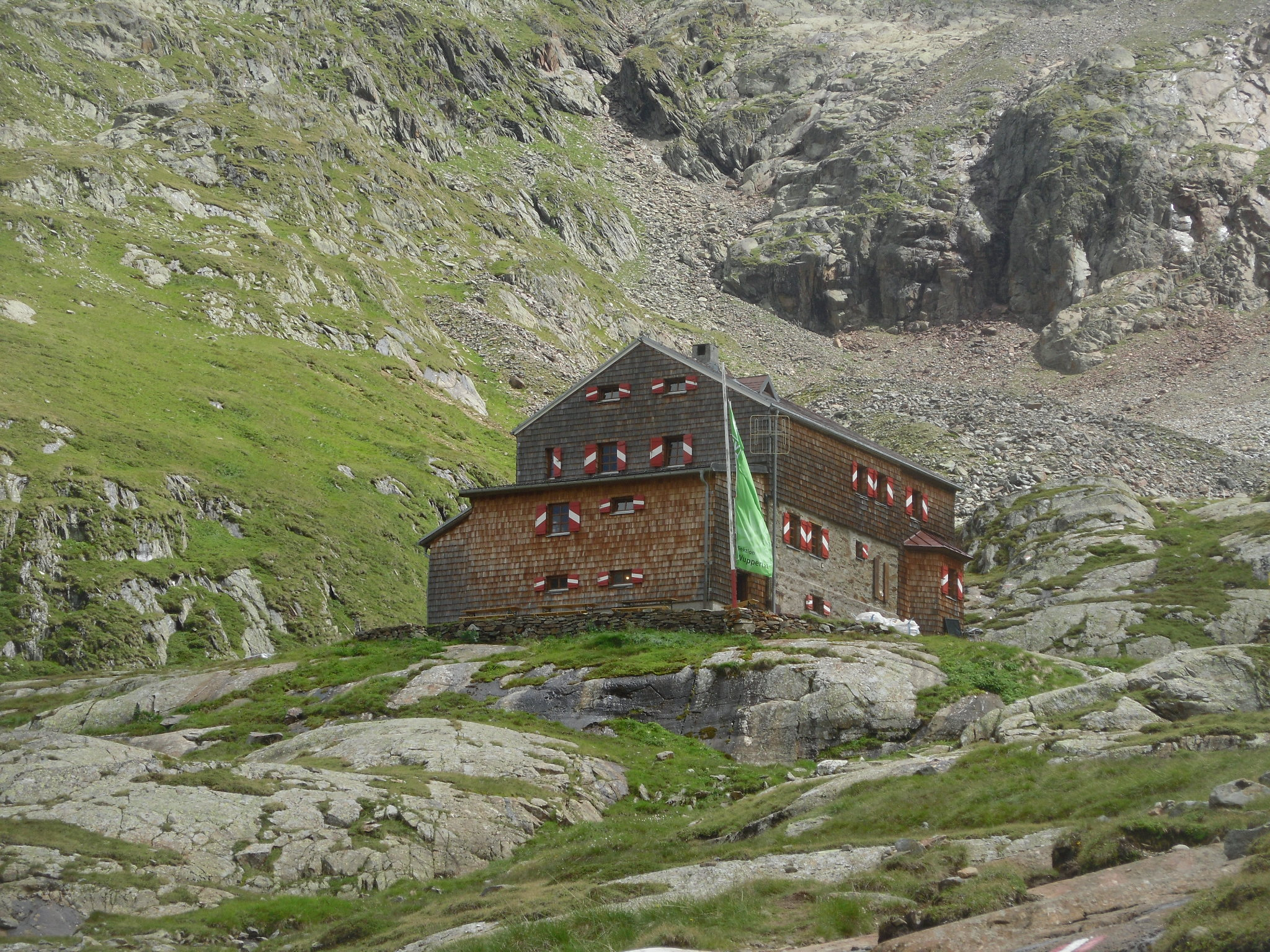
- Interactive map of the Elberfelder Hut area

General information
- Location: Upper Gößnitz valley
- Coordinates: 46°58′40″N 12°45′37″E
- Elevation: 2,346 m (7,697 ft)
- Year built: 1928
- Owner: Elberfeld Branch of the German Alpine Club

Website
- elberfelderhuette.com

The Elberfelder Hut (German: Elberfelder Hütte) is a mountain hut belonging to the German Alpine Club in the Schober Group within the Austrian Alps.

The mountain hut stands at 2,346 m in the upper Gößnitz valley and is managed from mid-June to mid-September. The Wuppertal branch of the German Alpine Club is responsible for it. The Siegburg and Recklinghausen branches also participate in managing the hut.

== History ==
The Elberfelder Hut was built in 1928. In the years 1982 and 1983, following an avalanche, the hut was renovated and extended. In 2005, repair work was carried out on the façade and roof. The hut has its own hydropower station to provide power and is exclusively supplied by helicopter.

The house is named after the Wuppertal quarter of Elberfeld.

== Ascents ==
- From Heiligenblut on the Elberfelder Weg through the Gößnitztal in four to five hours
- From Heiligenblut via the Langtalseen in 6 hours
- Via the Lienzer Hut and Gößnitz col (Gößnitzscharte): four hours

All timings refer to the actual journey time without stops and delays.

== Tours ==
=== Summit tours ===
- Roter Knopf, 3,281 m above sea level (AA) to the second-highest peak in the Schober Group in 3½ hours.
- Böses Weibl, 3,119 m above sea level (AA) along the Vienna Ridgeway (Wiener Höhenweg) in 3 hours.
- Kreuzkopf, 3,103 m above sea level (AA), 2½ hours.
- Glödis, 3,206 m above sea level (AA), 5½ hours.

=== Crossings ===
The Elberfelder Hut is on the Vienna Ridgeway, which runs from the Iselsberg to the Glocknerhaus. Its neighbouring huts are reached as follows:

- To the Adolf-Noßberger Hut there is a crossing using the Vienna Ridgeway via the Horn Col (Hornscharte) (2,958 m above sea level (AA)), which takes five hours of journey time.
- The shorter crossing to the Noßberger Hut via the Klammer Col (Klammerscharte) is only advisable in good snow conditions. From mid-July it is usually dangerous and not recommended due to the high risk of rockfalls and lack of snow.
- Also on the Vienna Ridgeway is the Glorer Hut in the Glockner Group which may be reached in five–six hours via the Kesselkees Saddle and the Peischlachtörl.
- Via the Gößnitz Col (Gößnitzscharte, 2,737 m above sea level (AA)) ) south of the hut to the Lienzer Hut in three–four hours.
- Via the Leibniztörl (2,591 m above sea level (AA)) in seven hours to the Hochschober Hut.

== Accident ==
On 8 September 2016, shortly after take-off, a helicopter on the return leg of a supply flight to the Elberfelder Hut, crashed into the mountainside killing its pilot, Hannes Arch. The hut manager, who had spontaneously decided to accompany Arch, was injured but was able to be rescued.

== Literature ==
- Alpenvereinskarte 41 Schobergruppe. Deutscher Alpenverein, Munich, 2005.
