= Wangenitzsee =

Alpine lake in Carinthia, Austria

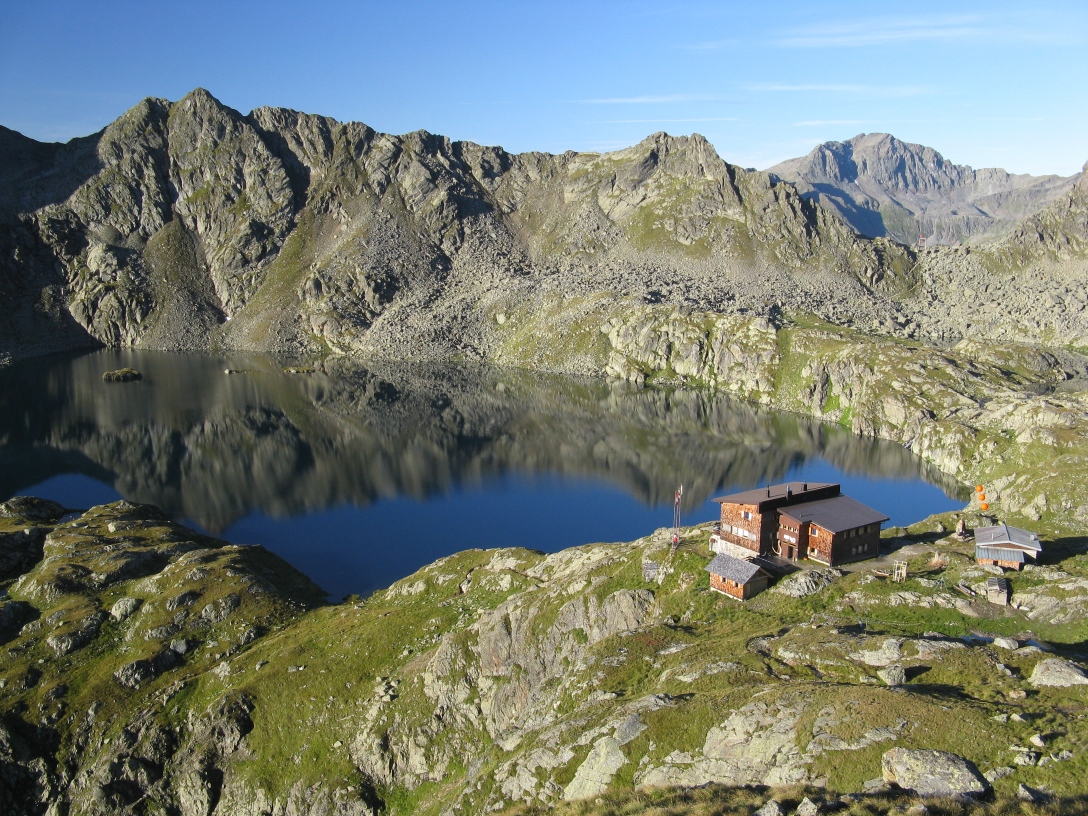

- Location in Austria
- Location: Carinthia, Austria
- Coordinates: 46°55′38″N 12°48′00″E
- Catchment area: 1.94 square kilometres (0.75 mi^{2})
- Surface area: 21.57 ha (53.3 acres)
- Average depth: 16.2 m (53 ft)
- Max. depth: 48 m (157 ft)
- Water volume: 3,487,000,000 m^{3} (9.21×10^{11} US gal)
- Shore length^{1}: 2 km (1.2 mi)
- Surface elevation: 2,465 m (8,087 ft) above sea level AA
- ^{1} Shore length is not a well-defined measure.

The Wangenitzsee is an alpine lake in Carinthia, Austria. It is located in the Schober group of Hohe Tauern National Park, and is at an altitude of 2,465 metres (8,087 ft) above sea level (AA).

The lake lies south-east from the Hoher Perschitzkopf, just some 100 meters away from the border to East Tyrol. On its north bank lies the Wangenitzsee Hut, meaning that the lake is on the Wiener Höhenweg.

The lake has an area of 21.57 hectares (53.3 acres). It has a maximum depth of 48 metres (157 ft), with an average depth of 16.2 metres (53 ft). The shoreline is 2 kilometres (1.2 mi) long, and the volume of the lake is 3,487,000,000 cubic metres (9.21×10^{11} US gal).

In the southwestern part of the lake lie three small islands. The catchment area of the lake is relatively small, at 1.94 square kilometres (0.75 mi^{2}). The main inflow of the lake is the Kreuzsee, which is drained via the Wangenitzbach into the Möll.

The flora in the area around the lake consists primarily of Carex curvula and Scheuchzer's cottongrass.

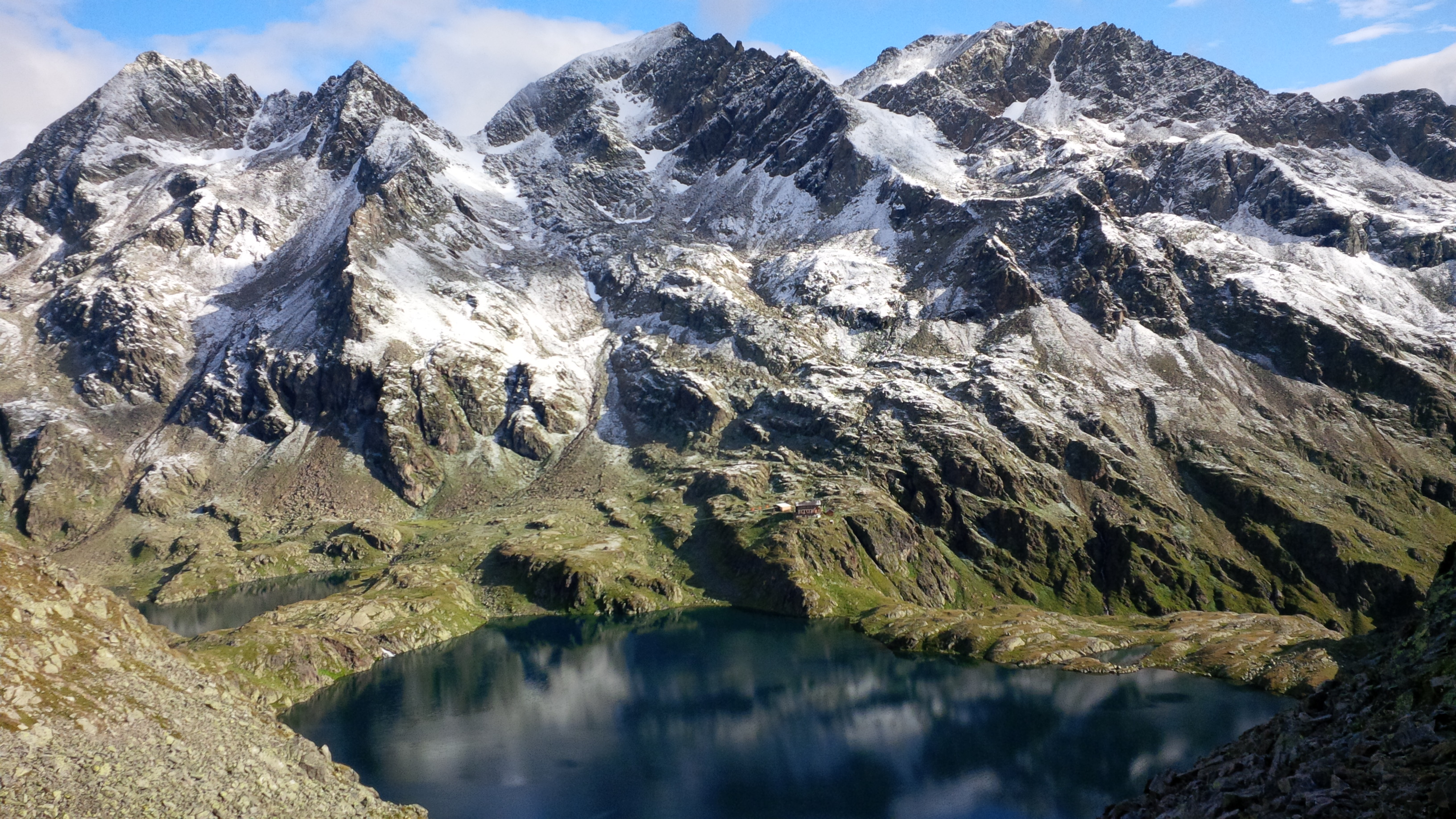
The Wangenitzsee, and behind it, Hoher Perschitzkopf, Kruckelkopf and Petzeck (from the left); in the middle, the Wangenitzsee Hut; and to the left, the Kreuzsee.

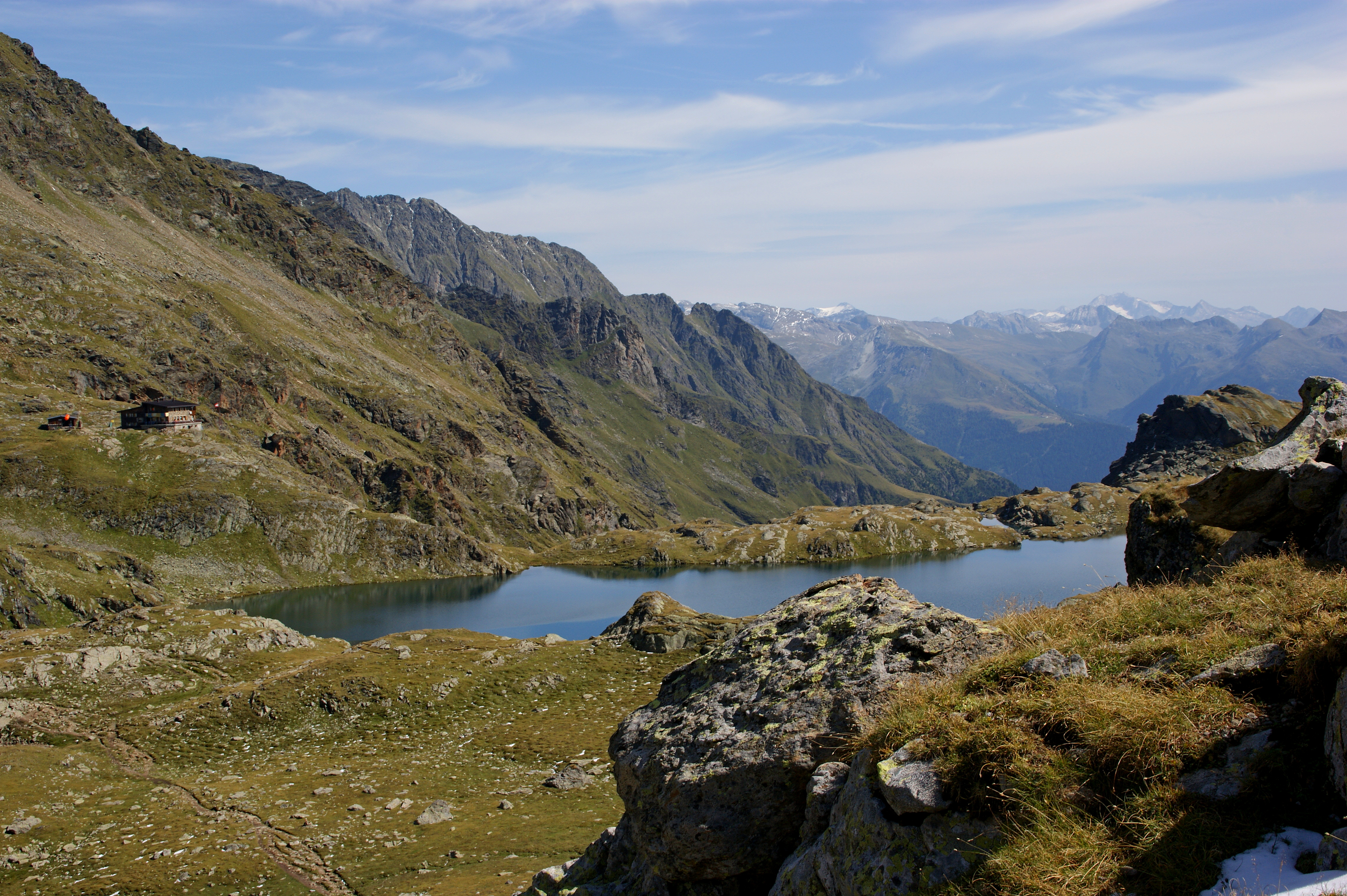
