= Lienz =

Lienz Lianz
- Municipality
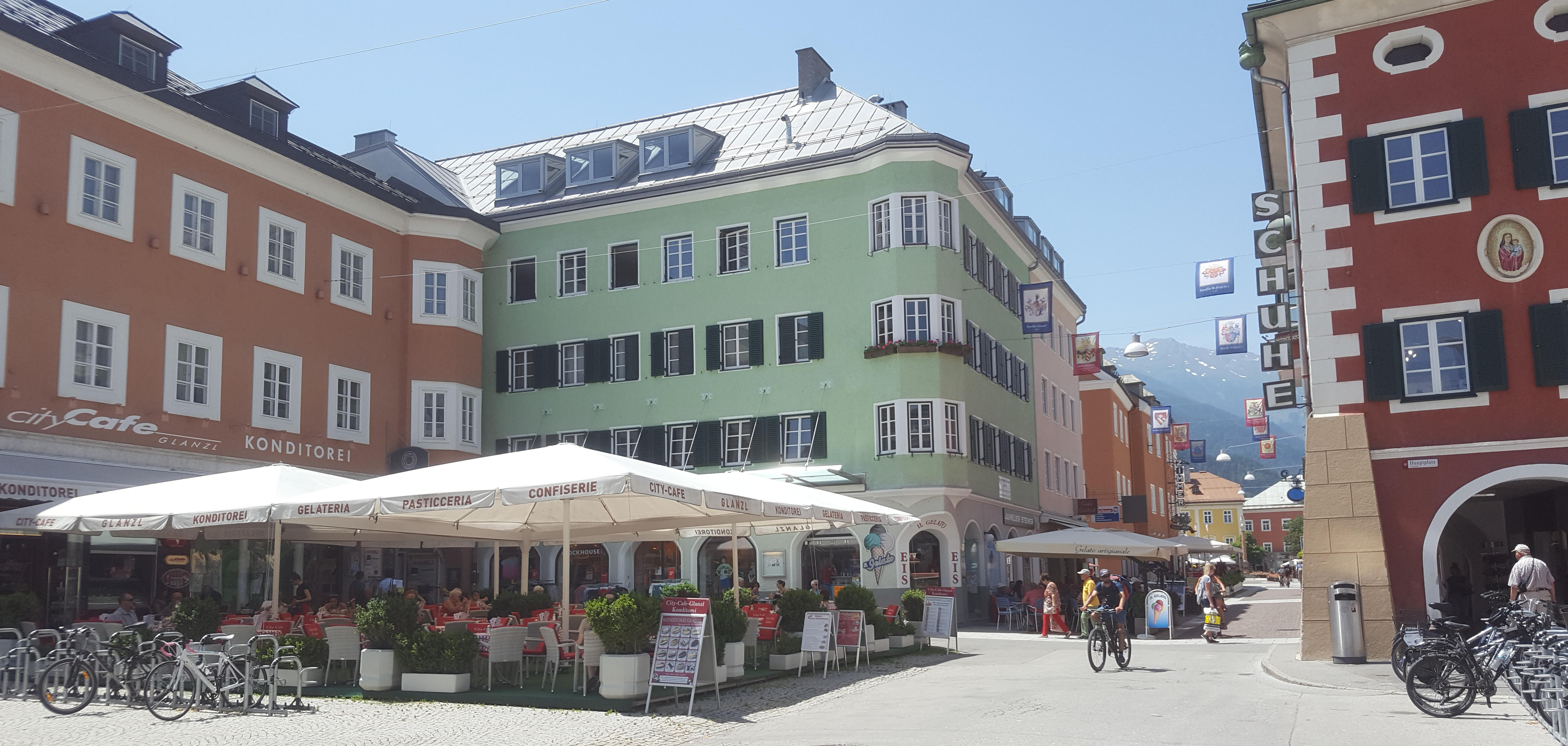
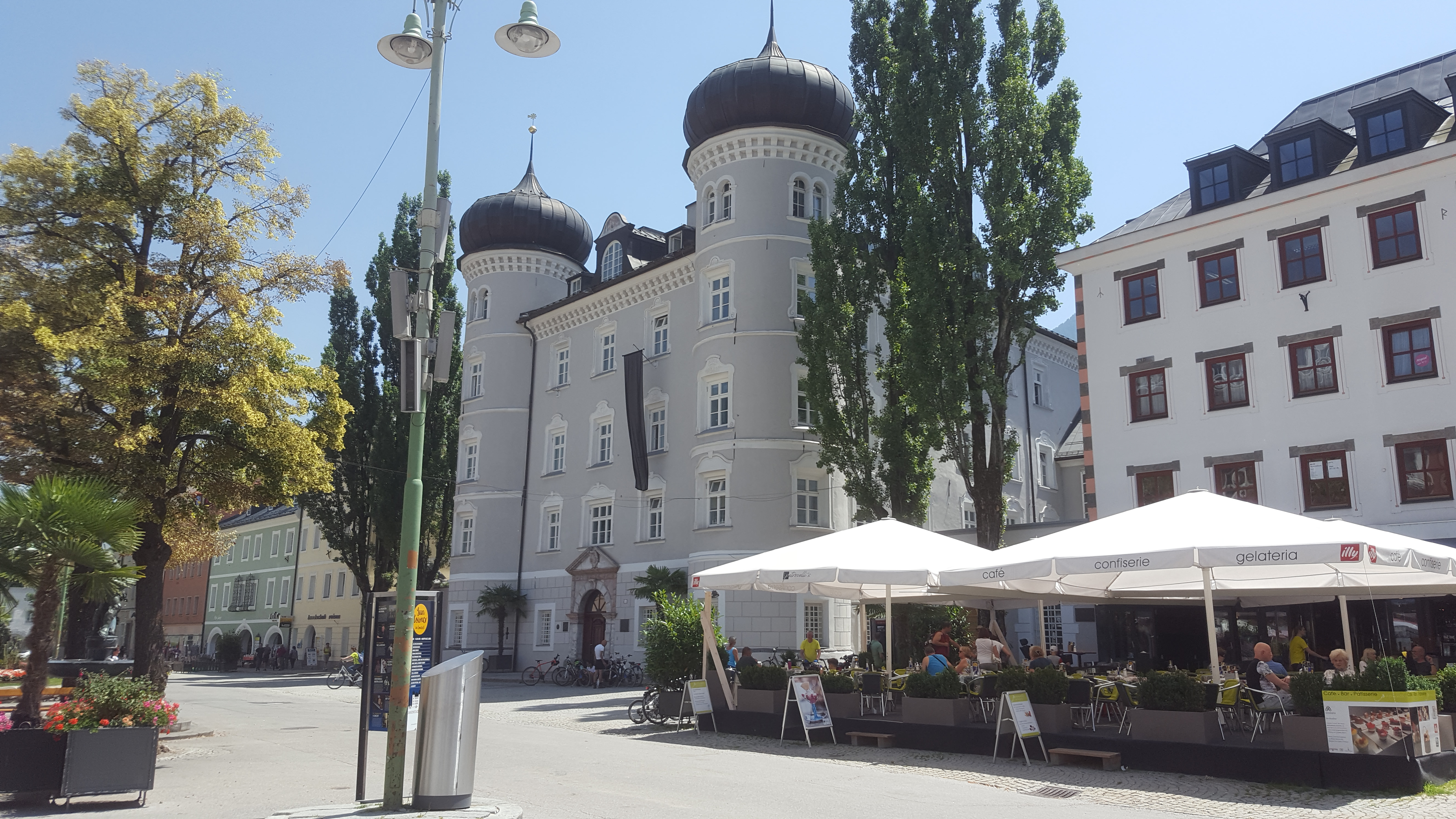
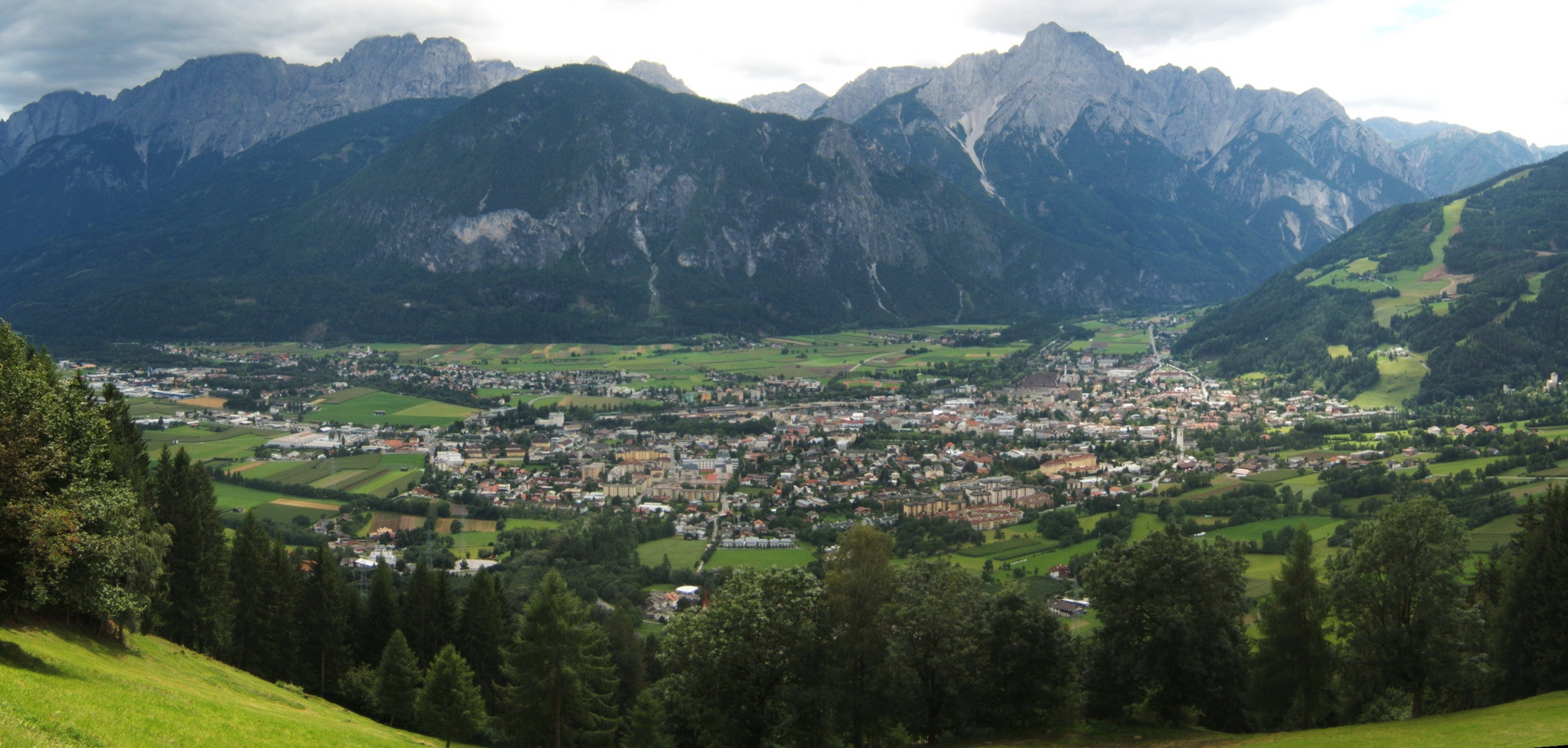
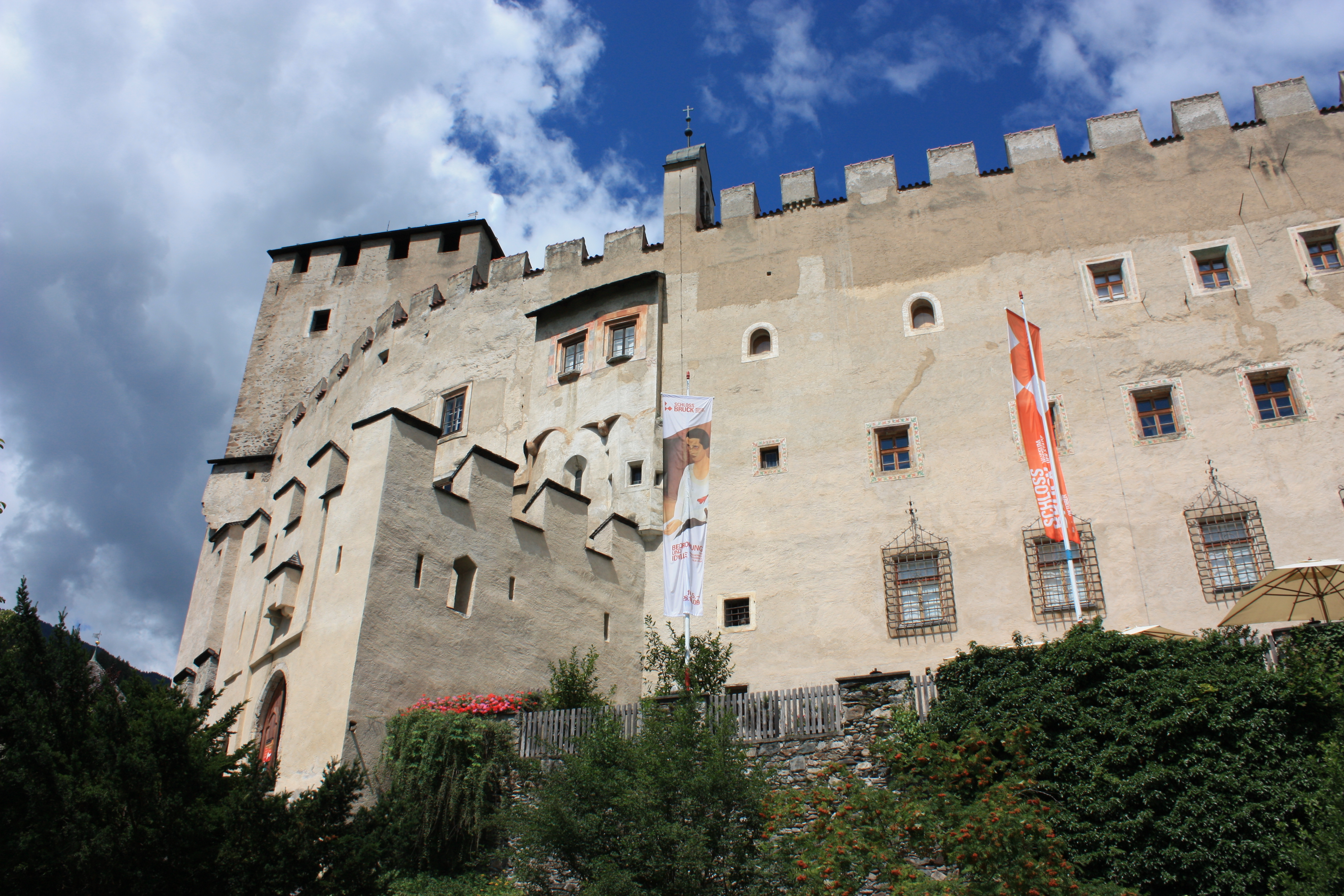
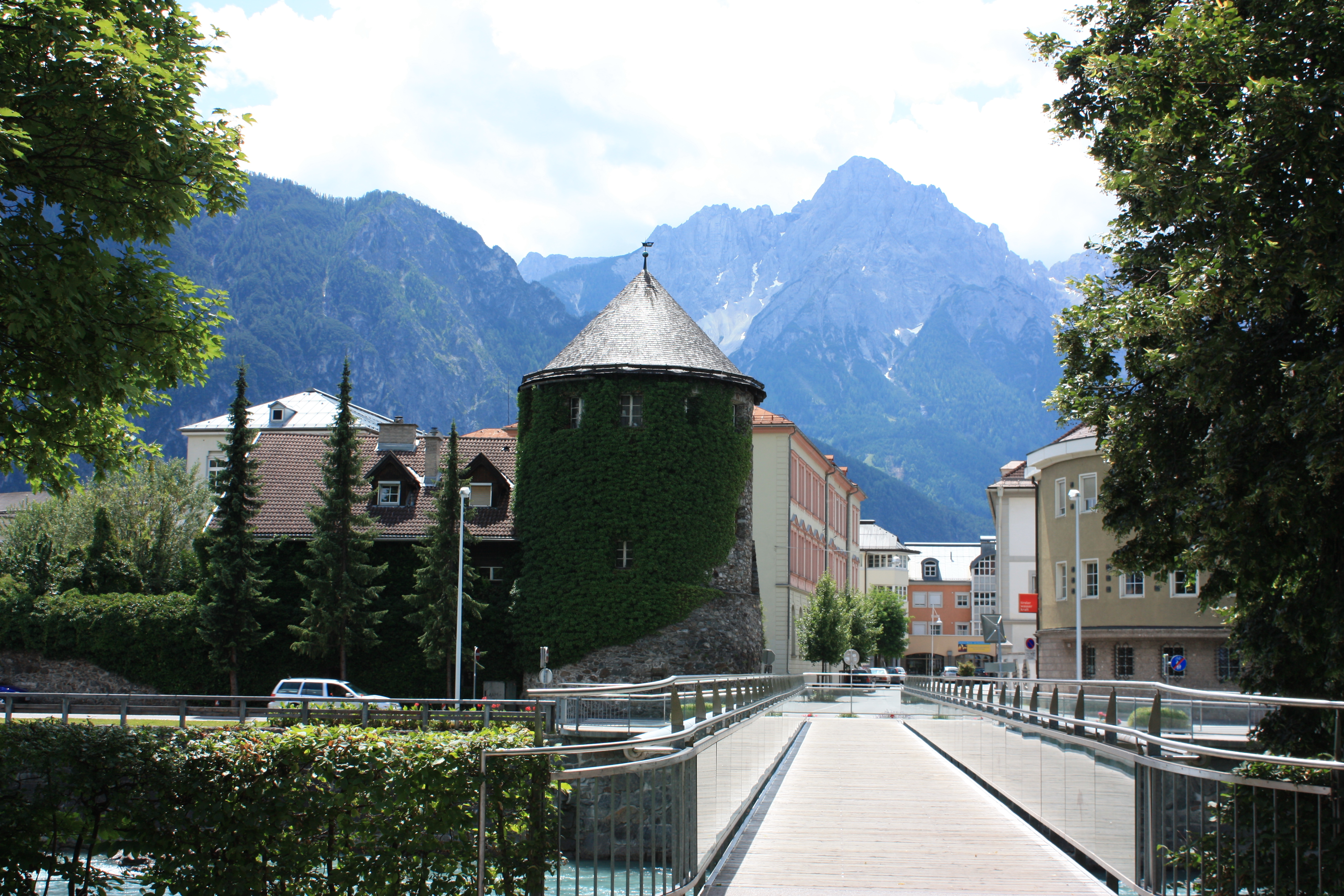
- From top down, left to right: Main Square, City Hall (former Schloss Liebburg), Lienz as seen from the North, Burg Bruck, Iselsteg bridge and Iselturm

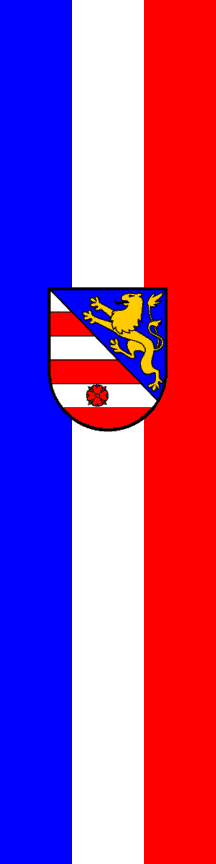
- Flag Coat of arms

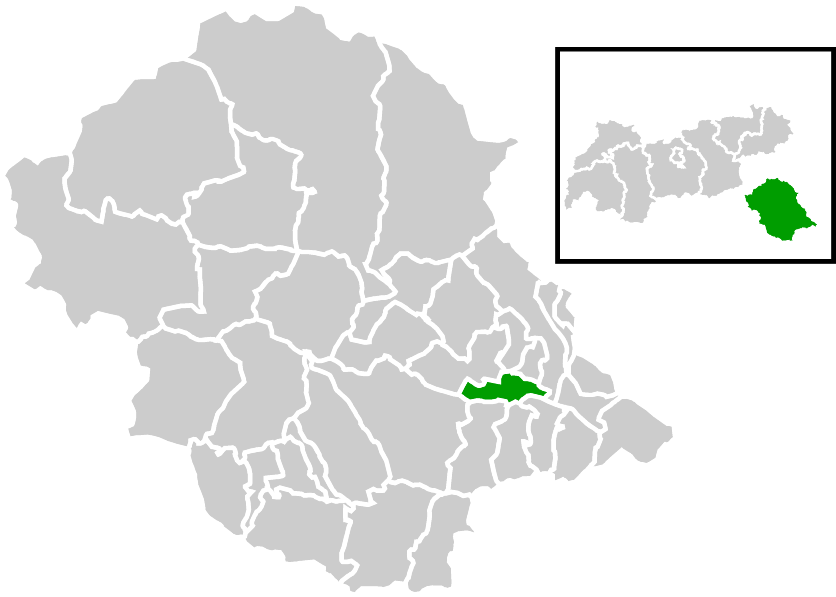
- Location within Lienz district

- Location of Lienz within the State of Tyrol Location of Lienz within Austria
- Coordinates: 46°49′47″N 12°46′11″E
- Country: Austria
- State: Tyrol
- District: Lienz

Government
  - Mayor: Elisabeth Blanik (SPÖ)

Area
  - Total: 15.94 km^{2} (6.15 sq mi)
- Elevation: 673 m (2,208 ft)

Population (2021)
  - Total: 11,935
  - Density: 748.7/km^{2} (1,939/sq mi)
- Time zone: UTC+1 (CET)
  - Summer (DST): UTC+2 (CEST)
- Postal code: 9900
- Area code: 04852
- Vehicle registration: LZ
- Website: www.stadt-lienz.at

Lienz (German: [ˈliːɛnt͡s]; Southern Bavarian: Lianz) is a medieval town in the Austrian state of Tyrol. It is the administrative centre of the Lienz district, which covers all of East Tyrol. The municipality also includes the cadastral subdivision of Patriasdorf.

== Geography ==
Lienz is located at the confluence of the rivers Isel and Drava in the Eastern Alps, between the Hohe Tauern mountain range in the north (including the Schober and Kreuzeck groups), and the Gailtal Alps in the south. It is connected with Winklern in Carinthia by the Iselsberg Pass. The neighbouring municipality of Leisach marks the easternmost point of the Puster Valley.

Lienz is on the foot of one of the largest alpine megafans in the Alps or globally, 350 m high and 2.5 km in radius, with a typical gradient of 14%. It emanates from a small steep side-valley with a failing crest, of less than twice its area, thus suggesting origins in one or a few catastrophic events.

By the continuing growth of the city, some smaller villages around – though officially municipalities in their own right – are now widely considered to be suburbs of Lienz. Those suburbs comprise:

| | Thurn, Gaimberg |
| Leisach, Oberlienz | | Nußdorf-Debant |
| | Amlach, Tristach |

== History ==
The area of Lienz had been settled since the Bronze Age about 2000 BC. Celtic people lived here from about 300 BC on, mainly as miners, who came under control of the Roman Empire in 15 BC. The area was incorporated into the province of Noricum and Emperor Claudius had a municipium called Aguntum erected near Lienz in the today's municipality of Dölsach. Aguntum became the see of an Early Christian bishop in the 5th century but decayed during the Slavic settlement of the Eastern Alps and the subsequent fights with the Bavarii under Duke Tassilo I around 600. Part of the Slavic principality of Carantania, the area passed under Bavarian and finally Frankish suzerainty during the 8th century.

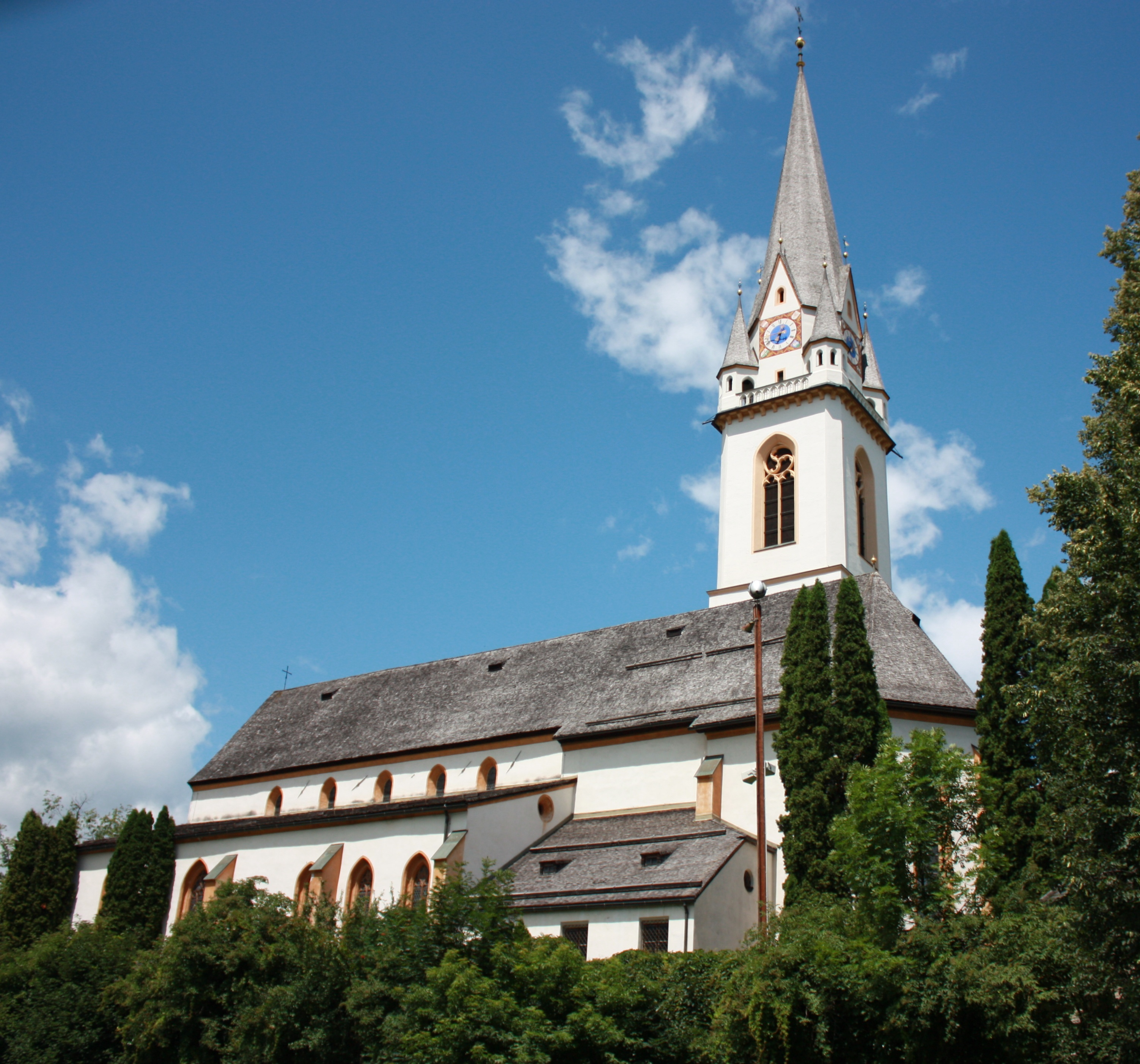
City parish church

Lienz itself was first mentioned as Luenzina in a deed issued by the Bishop of Brixen about 1030. The settlement itself, together with neighbouring Patriasdorf, then belonged of the Patriarchs of Aquileia, who were elevated to immediate landlords by Emperor Henry IV in 1077. It was then purchased by the scions of the Meinhardiner dynasty, who held the office of Aquileian Vögte (reeves) and chose Lienz as a residence. From about 1127 they called themselves Counts of Görz (Gorizia).

Located on the important trade route from Venzone in Friuli to Salzburg, the market town of Lienz received city rights on 25 February 1242. In 1278 the Counts finished Burg Bruck, a castle that until 1500 served as their local seat. When the Meinhardiner became extinct in 1500 upon the death of Count Leonhard of Gorizia, their estates were bequeathed to the Habsburg King Maximilian I and finally incorporated into the County of Tyrol. From the status of a princely residence, Lienz sank to the insignificance of a provincial town within the Habsburg monarchy.

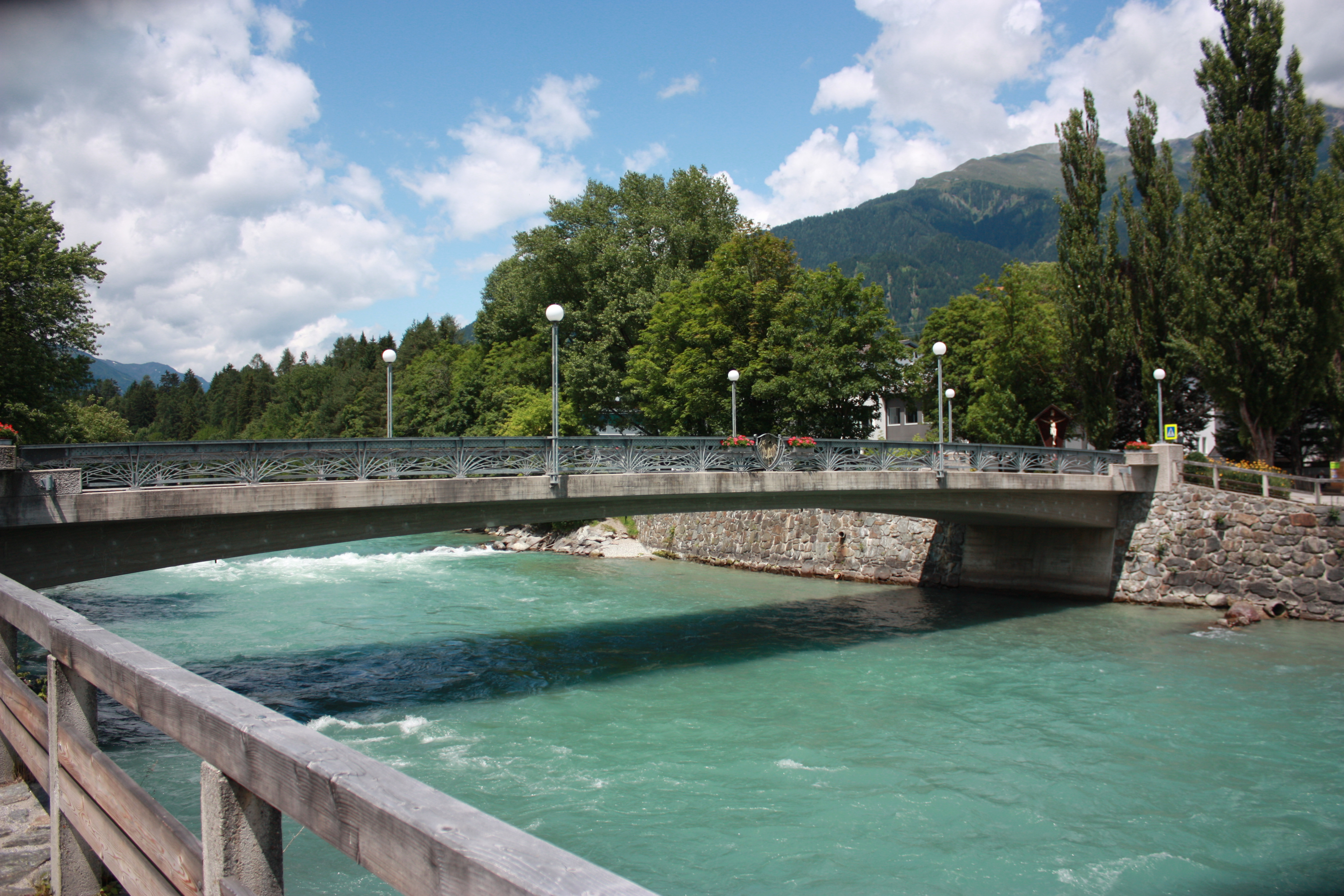
Pfarrbrücke bridge

During the Italian campaigns of the French Revolutionary Wars, Lienz was occupied twice by French troops in 1797. After the Austrian defeat at the Battle of Austerlitz, Lienz with Tyrol passed to the newly elevated Kingdom of Bavaria according to the 1805 Peace of Pressburg. In 1809 it became the administrative centre of a district within the short-lived Napoleonic Illyrian Provinces, but was reconquered by Austrian troops in 1813. Within the Austrian Empire (the Cisleithanian part of Austria-Hungary after 1867) it was the seat of the district of the same name, one of the 21 Bezirkshauptmannschaften in Tyrol.

In November 1918 it was occupied by the Italian Army. After World War I the southern parts of the Tyrol (i.e. Trentino and South Tyrol) were awarded to the Kingdom of Italy under the terms of the London Pact and the 1919 Treaty of Saint-Germain, making the Lienz district of East Tyrol an exclave with no territorial connection to the mainland of North Tyrol. After the 1938 Anschluss of the Federal State of Austria into Nazi Germany, the Lienz district became a part of Reichsgau Kärnten (Carinthia).

On 8 May 1945 British forces occupied Lienz, which together with Carinthia and Styria became part of the British occupation zone. The repatriation of Cossacks after World War II forcibly transferred roughly 45,000 Cossack collaborators with Nazi Germany and their families to the Soviet Union in what is called Operation KeelHaul. Most belonged to the XV SS Cossack Cavalry Corps or the Kazachi Stan mobile encampment, which had served as armed units of the German occupation. Kazachi Stan was encamped at Lienz where the British employed deception and force to clear the camps giving rise to the narrative of "Betrayal of the Cossacks".

== Climate ==
Lienz has relatively warm and humid summers and cold winters. Between 1971–2000, there was a recorded precipitation of 915 mm (36 in). Most of the rain falls during the summer months, especially from June to August (respectively 98, 119 and 100 mm (3.9, 4.7 and 3.9 in)). The driest months are January and February (42 and 35 mm (1.7 and 1.4 in))

The average temperature in July is 18.5 °C (65.3 °F). In January it is about −5.2 °C (22.6 °F). Lienz is also one of the sunniest cities in Austria with an average of 5.4 hours of sun per day or 1952 hours per year. The Köppen Climate Classification subtype for this climate is "Dfb" (humid continental).

Lienz

Climate chart (precipitation, max. and min. temperature)
| J | F | M | A | M | J | J | A | S | O | N | D |
| 42 0 −9 | 35 5 −6 | 59 10 −2 | 66 14 2 | 85 19 7 | 98 23 10 | 119 25 12 | 100 24 12 | 89 21 8 | 96 14 3 | 77 6 −3 | 50 0 −7 |
- █ Average max. and min. temperatures in °C
- █ Precipitation totals in mm
- Source: ZAMG
Imperial conversion
| J | F | M | A | M | J | J | A | S | O | N | D |
| 1.7 32 16 | 1.4 41 21 | 2.3 50 28 | 2.6 57 36 | 3.3 66 45 | 3.9 73 50 | 4.7 77 54 | 3.9 75 54 | 3.5 70 46 | 3.8 57 37 | 3 43 27 | 2 32 19 |
- █ Average max. and min. temperatures in °F
- █ Precipitation totals in inches

Climate data for Lienz (1971–2000)
| Month | Jan | Feb | Mar | Apr | May | Jun | Jul | Aug | Sep | Oct | Nov | Dec | Year |
|---|---|---|---|---|---|---|---|---|---|---|---|---|---|
| Record high °C (°F) | 12.9 (55.2) | 21.0 (69.8) | 24.0 (75.2) | 25.9 (78.6) | 30.0 (86.0) | 33.0 (91.4) | 37.7 (99.9) | 33.7 (92.7) | 30.0 (86.0) | 26.0 (78.8) | 17.2 (63.0) | 15.5 (59.9) | 37.7 (99.9) |
| Mean daily maximum °C (°F) | 0.1 (32.2) | 4.7 (40.5) | 10.1 (50.2) | 14.4 (57.9) | 19.3 (66.7) | 22.5 (72.5) | 24.9 (76.8) | 24.4 (75.9) | 20.5 (68.9) | 14.2 (57.6) | 5.7 (42.3) | 0.2 (32.4) | 13.4 (56.1) |
| Daily mean °C (°F) | −5.2 (22.6) | −1.9 (28.6) | 3.1 (37.6) | 7.6 (45.7) | 12.7 (54.9) | 15.9 (60.6) | 17.9 (64.2) | 17.2 (63.0) | 13.0 (55.4) | 7.3 (45.1) | 0.6 (33.1) | −4.2 (24.4) | 7.0 (44.6) |
| Mean daily minimum °C (°F) | −9.0 (15.8) | −6.3 (20.7) | −1.6 (29.1) | 2.1 (35.8) | 6.7 (44.1) | 9.9 (49.8) | 11.8 (53.2) | 11.5 (52.7) | 7.8 (46.0) | 3.0 (37.4) | −2.7 (27.1) | −7.3 (18.9) | 2.2 (36.0) |
| Record low °C (°F) | −24.7 (−12.5) | −24.5 (−12.1) | −15.6 (3.9) | −5.7 (21.7) | −7.4 (18.7) | 1.3 (34.3) | 3.1 (37.6) | 1.8 (35.2) | −2.2 (28.0) | −11.6 (11.1) | −18.8 (−1.8) | −21.1 (−6.0) | −24.7 (−12.5) |
| Average precipitation mm (inches) | 42.4 (1.67) | 35.0 (1.38) | 58.6 (2.31) | 65.6 (2.58) | 85.4 (3.36) | 97.8 (3.85) | 119.0 (4.69) | 99.9 (3.93) | 88.5 (3.48) | 96.3 (3.79) | 76.5 (3.01) | 50.1 (1.97) | 915.1 (36.03) |
| Average snowfall cm (inches) | 31.1 (12.2) | 21.6 (8.5) | 21.7 (8.5) | 5.7 (2.2) | 1.0 (0.4) | 0.0 (0.0) | 0.0 (0.0) | 0.0 (0.0) | 0.0 (0.0) | 1.4 (0.6) | 18.1 (7.1) | 29.1 (11.5) | 129.7 (51.1) |
| Average precipitation days (≥ 1.0 mm) | 5.4 | 4.2 | 5.7 | 7.4 | 10.6 | 11.8 | 11.2 | 11.2 | 7.9 | 7.3 | 6.4 | 5.9 | 95.0 |
| Average relative humidity (%) (at 14:00) | 74.1 | 55.4 | 48.6 | 46.8 | 50.5 | 51.7 | 51.0 | 52.7 | 54.4 | 57.8 | 69.7 | 79.9 | 57.7 |
| Mean monthly sunshine hours | 76.1 | 151.2 | 175.4 | 175.8 | 200.2 | 205.6 | 237.5 | 227.7 | 194.1 | 164.6 | 97.0 | 46.2 | 1,952 |
| Percentage possible sunshine | 41.7 | 57.5 | 55.3 | 49.9 | 48.6 | 49.8 | 56.4 | 58.5 | 60.2 | 54.4 | 45.5 | 30.0 | 50.7 |
Source: Central Institute for Meteorology and Geodynamics

== Population ==
Historical population
| Year | Pop. | ±% |
|---|---|---|
| 1869 | 2,484 | — |
| 1880 | 3,142 | +26.5% |
| 1890 | 3,878 | +23.4% |
| 1900 | 4,549 | +17.3% |
| 1910 | 6,532 | +43.6% |
| 1923 | 6,591 | +0.9% |
| 1934 | 6,885 | +4.5% |
| 1939 | 8,458 | +22.8% |
| 1951 | 10,096 | +19.4% |
| 1961 | 11,132 | +10.3% |
| 1971 | 11,741 | +5.5% |
| 1981 | 11,661 | −0.7% |
| 1991 | 11,864 | +1.7% |
| 2001 | 12,079 | +1.8% |
| 2011 | 11,955 | −1.0% |

== Politics ==
The municipal council (Gemeinderat) consists of 21 members. Since the 2022 Tyrolean local elections, it is made up of the following parties:

- Social Democratic Party of Austria (SPÖ): 9 seats
- Austrian People's Party (ÖVP): 5 seats
- Team Lienz (Team LZ): 3 seats
- People - Freedom - Fundamental Rights (MFG): 2 seats
- Freedom Party of Austria (FPÖ): 1 seat
- The Greens - The Green Alternative (GRÜNE): 1 seat

== Transport ==
Lienz is located at a road junction between the Drautalstraße highway, leading from Carinthia to the Puster Valley in the Italian province of South Tyrol (B100), and the Felbertauernstraße (B108) from Lienz to Mittersill in Salzburg. It is also connected by the Drautalbahn railway line from Villach to Innichen in South Tyrol. The Felbertauerntunnel between Mittersill and Lienz was completed in 1967.

== Notable people ==
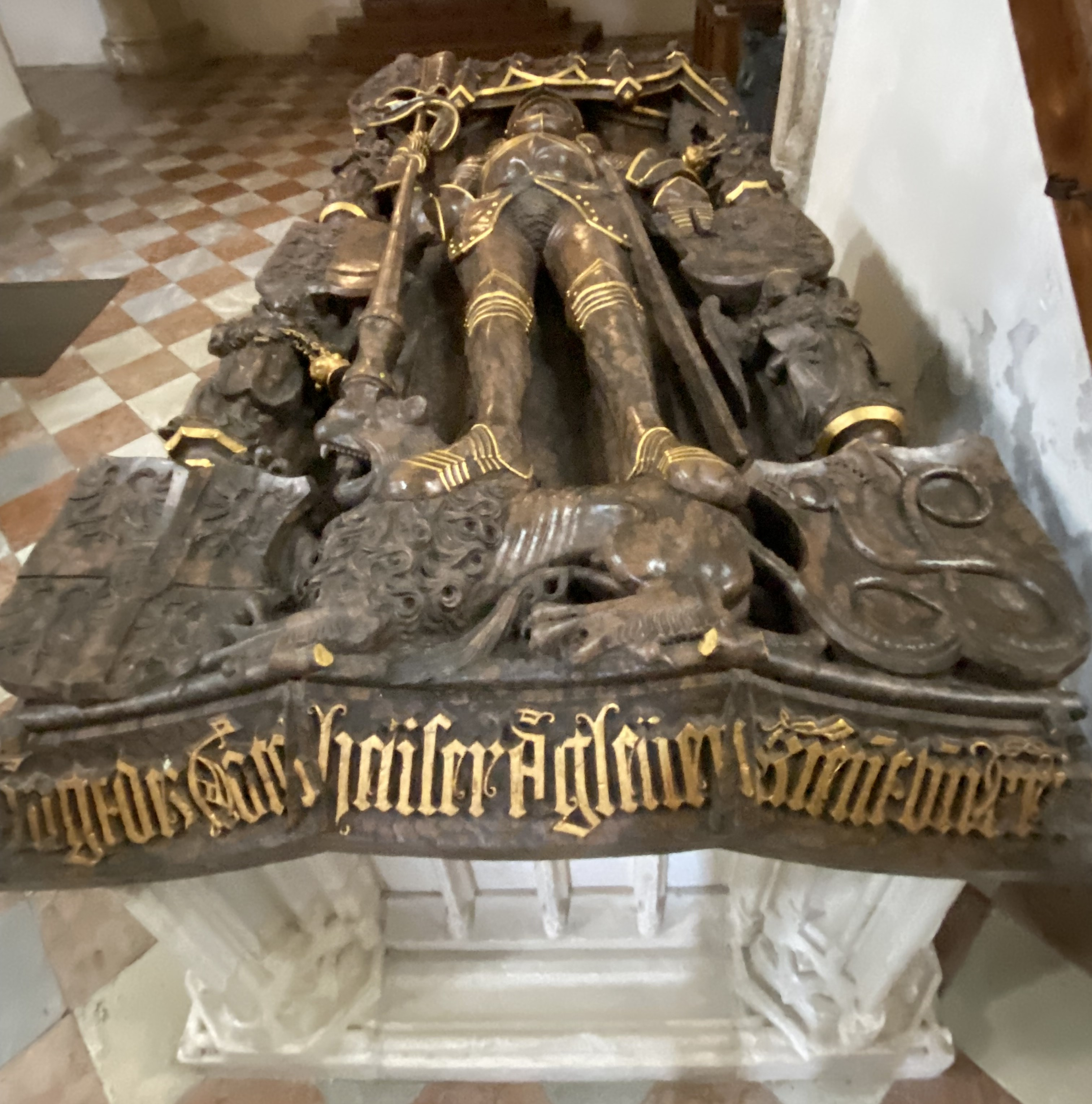
Tomb of Leonhard of Gorizia in St. Andreas parish church, 1506-1507

- Leonhard of Gorizia (1440–1500), born at Burg Bruck castle, the last count of Gorizia.
- Albert Anton von Muchar (1786-1849), an Austrian historian.
- Beda Weber (1798-1859), author, theologian and member of the Frankfurt Parliament.
- Albin Egger-Lienz (1868-1926), painter of rustic genre and historical paintings.
- Theodor Danegger (1891–1959), film actor, he appeared in over 70 films between 1932 and 1959.
- Raimund Abraham (1933–2010), architect, self-described as an incurable formalist

=== Sport ===
- Josef Stiegler (born 1937), alpine skier
- Anton Steiner (born 1958), alpine skier
- Alexander Lugger (born 1968), ski mountaineer
- Fritz Strobl (born 1972), alpine skier
- Wolfgang Mair (born 1980), footballer
- Dominic Hassler (born 1981), footballer
- Lilli Tagger (born 2008), tennis player

== International relations ==
=== Twin towns – Sister cities ===
Lienz is twinned with:

- Gorizia, Italy, since 2000
- Jackson, Wyoming, United States, since 1970
- Selçuk, Turkey, since 1970

== See also ==
- Dolomitenmann
