= Hoher Prijakt =

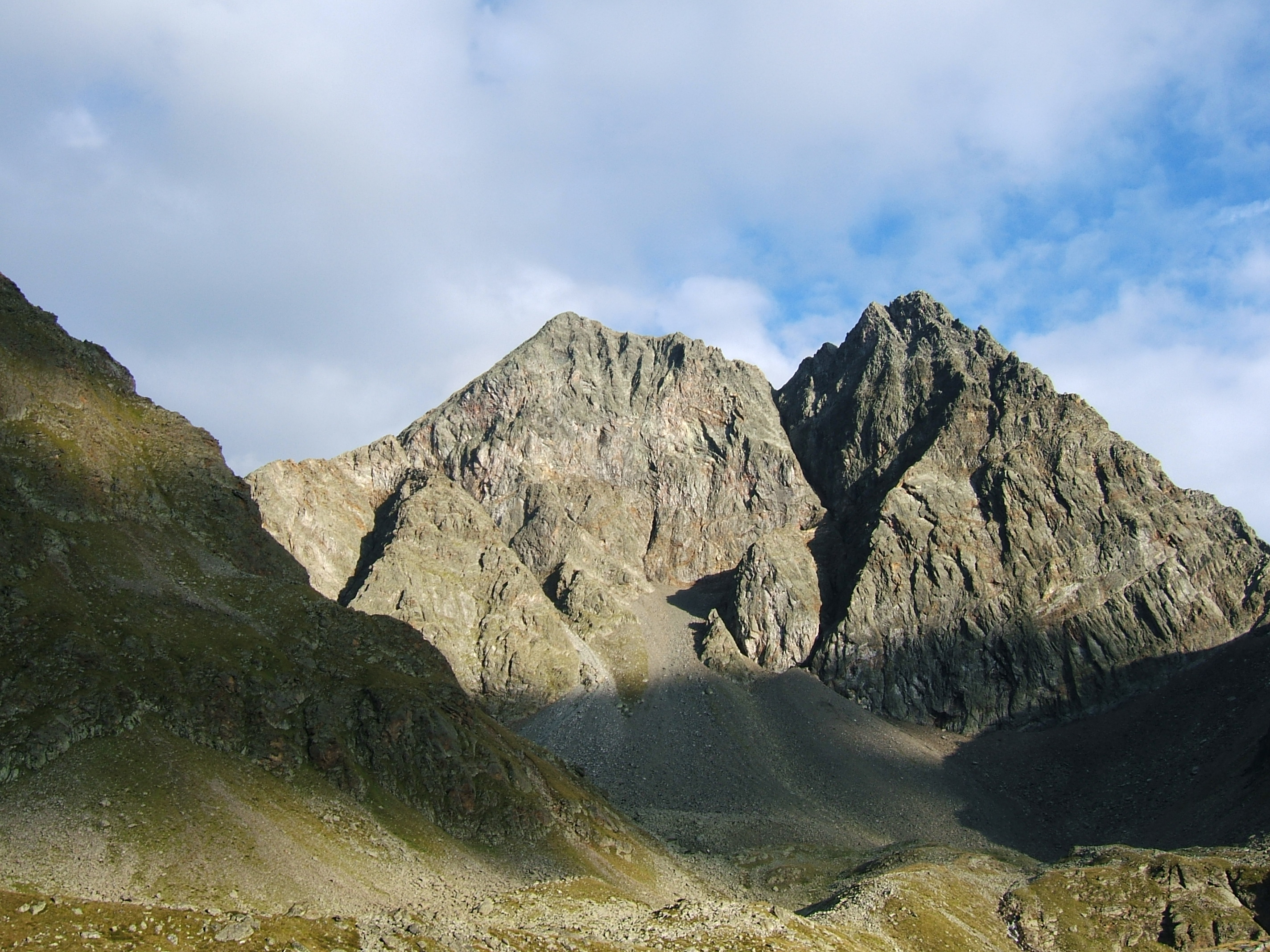
- The High (left) and Low Prijakt from the northwest, from the Hochschober Hut

Highest point
- Elevation: 3,064 m (AA) (10,052 ft)
- Prominence: 475 m ↓ Leibnitztörl
- Isolation: 2.80 km → Hochschober
- Listing: Alpine mountains above 3000 m
- Coordinates: 46°54′57″N 12°42′44″E

Geography
- Location within Austria
- Location: East Tyrol, Austria
- Parent range: High Tauern, Schober Group

Climbing
- First ascent: 29 July 1890 by Ludwig Purtscheller
- Normal route: From the north via the Barrenlesee lake, western Barreneckscharte notch and the eastern arête (I)

The Hoher Prijakt ("High Prijakt", 3,064 m (AA)) and Niederer Prijakt ("Low Prijakt", 3,056 m above sea level (AA)) are a prominent double summit which, seen from the west and north, form one of the most attractively-shaped mountains of the Schober Group in the state of Tyrol in western Austria. The summit cross was placed on the lower Niederer Prijakt which is easier to see from the valley.

The easiest route to the Hoher Prijakt takes about three hours from the Hochschober Hut heading for the Mirnitzscharte notch, later turning north and heading past the lake of Barrenlesee until just below the western Barreneckscharte notch and finally making its way along the unchallenging eastern arête to the summit. The route is waymarked and free of snow and ice in the summer, but does require sure-footedness.

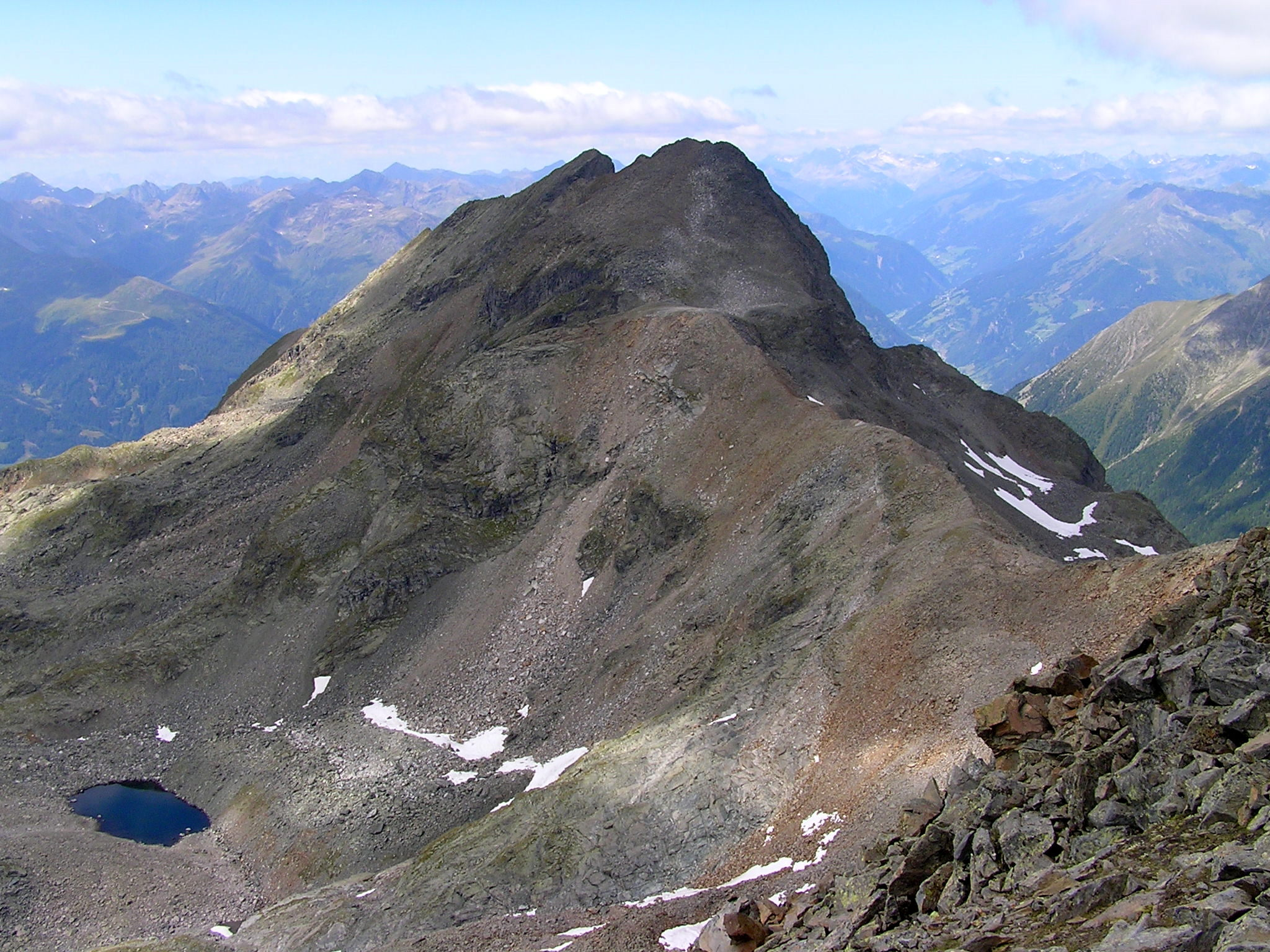
The Hoher (right) and Niederer Prijakt from the Alkuser Rotspitze to the east

The Hoher Prijakt and Niederer Prijakt are separated by the Prijaktscharte, a notch which is a good 60 metres (200 ft) deep. The crossing of the linking ridge takes about 30 minutes and is rated as grade II, but the difficulty is somewhat reduced by protective steel cables. The Niederer Prijakt can alternatively also be ascended on a climbing route, that is not too difficult, from the Mirschachscharte notch along the southwestern arête. The rather more challenging western arête is one of the most beautiful climbing routes in the Schoberg Group, and gains a height of 400 metres (1,300 ft) (grade IV).

== Literature and maps ==
- Alpine Club map Sheet 41, 1:25,000 series, Schobergruppe, ISBN 3-928777-12-2
- Richard Goedeke: 3000er in den Nordalpen, Bruckmann, Munich, 2004, ISBN 3-7654-3930-4
- Georg Zlöbl: Die Dreitausender Osttirols im Nationalpark Hohe Tauern, Verlag Grafik Zloebl, 2005, ISBN 3-200-00428-2
- Walter Mair: Alpenvereinsführer Schobergruppe. Bergverlag Rudolf Rother, Munich, 1979. ISBN 3-7633-1222-6
