= Albert Anton von Muchar =

Austrian historian

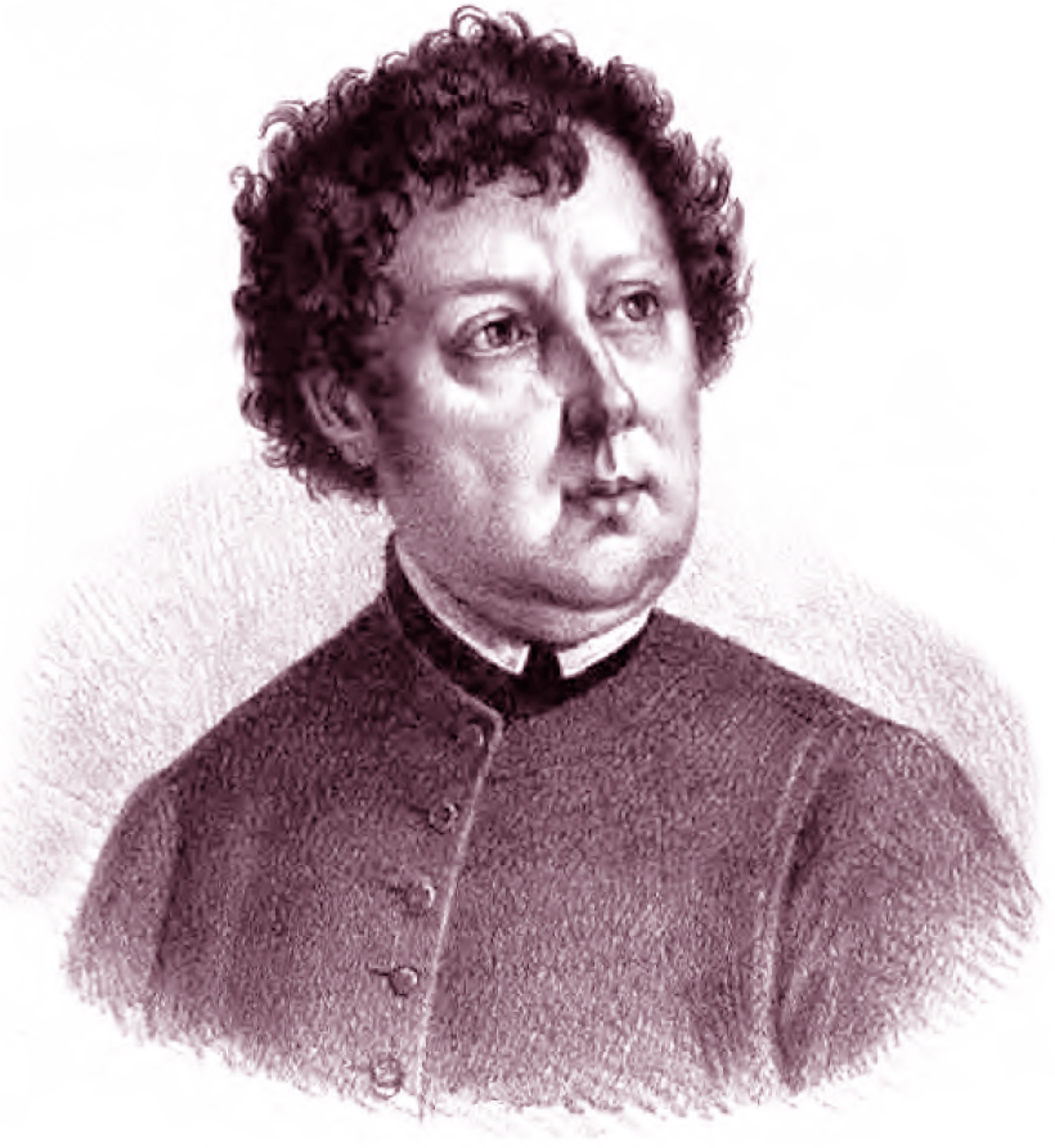
- Born: November 22, 1786; Lienz, Tyrol
- Died: June 6, 1849 (aged 62); Graz, Styria
- Occupation: Historian

Albert Anton von Muchar was an Austrian historian. He was descended from the Muchars of Bied and Rangfeld, studied at the lyceum in Graz, entered the Benedictine Order, and made his vows on 16 October 1808, at Admont. Ordained a priest shortly afterwards, he devoted himself entirely to the study of Middle Eastern languages, became librarian and keeper of the archives in 1813, and later on professor of Greek and Middle Eastern languages at the theological school of his monastery. From 1823 to 1825 he was supplementary professor of Biblical science, becoming afterwards professor of aesthetics and classical philology at the University of Graz.

Muchar's only surviving work of pure philology is an edition of Horace with German translation, which appeared in 1835 at Graz. His researches dealt chiefly with the history of Austria, for which purpose he made extensive visits to the libraries of Austria, Bavaria, and Upper Italy, basing his work directly on the original sources. In 1829, the Academy of Sciences in Vienna elected him a member in recognition of his important contributions to national history, and he was one of the founders of the Historical Society for Inner Austria.

== Published works ==
- Das römische Norikum (2 vols., Graz, 1825-6);
- Geschichte des Herzogtums Steiermark (History of the Duchy of Styria; Graz, 1845–74) in nine volumes, of which the first four were edited by himself, the following two by his colleagues, Prangner and von Gräfenstein, and the last three by the Historical Society of Styria.
- Numerous essays for historical periodicals, e. g. Hormayr's "Archiv", the Steiermarkische Zeitschrift, and the Archiv für Kunde österreichischer Geschichtsquellen (in which he published his Urkundenregesten für die Geschichte Innerösterreichs vom Jahre 1312-1500 (Vienna, 1849)).
- The library of Admont possesses in manuscripts some still more extensive works.
