= Gößnitzkopf =

Mountain in Austria

- Location within Austria

Highest point
- Elevation: 3,096 m (10,157 ft)
- Coordinates: 46°58′4.116″N 12°44′39.552″E

Geography
- Location: East Tyrol/Carinthia, Austria
- Parent range: Schober Group

Gößnitzkopf is a mountain in the Schober Group of the Hohe Tauern range. It is located in Austria, along the border of East Tyrol and Carinthia. The elevation at its peak is 3,096 metres (10,157 ft).

The nearest municipalities are Nußdorf-Debant, Tyrol to the west and Heiligenblut, Carinthia to the east.
