= Glödis =

Summit in East Tyrol, Austria

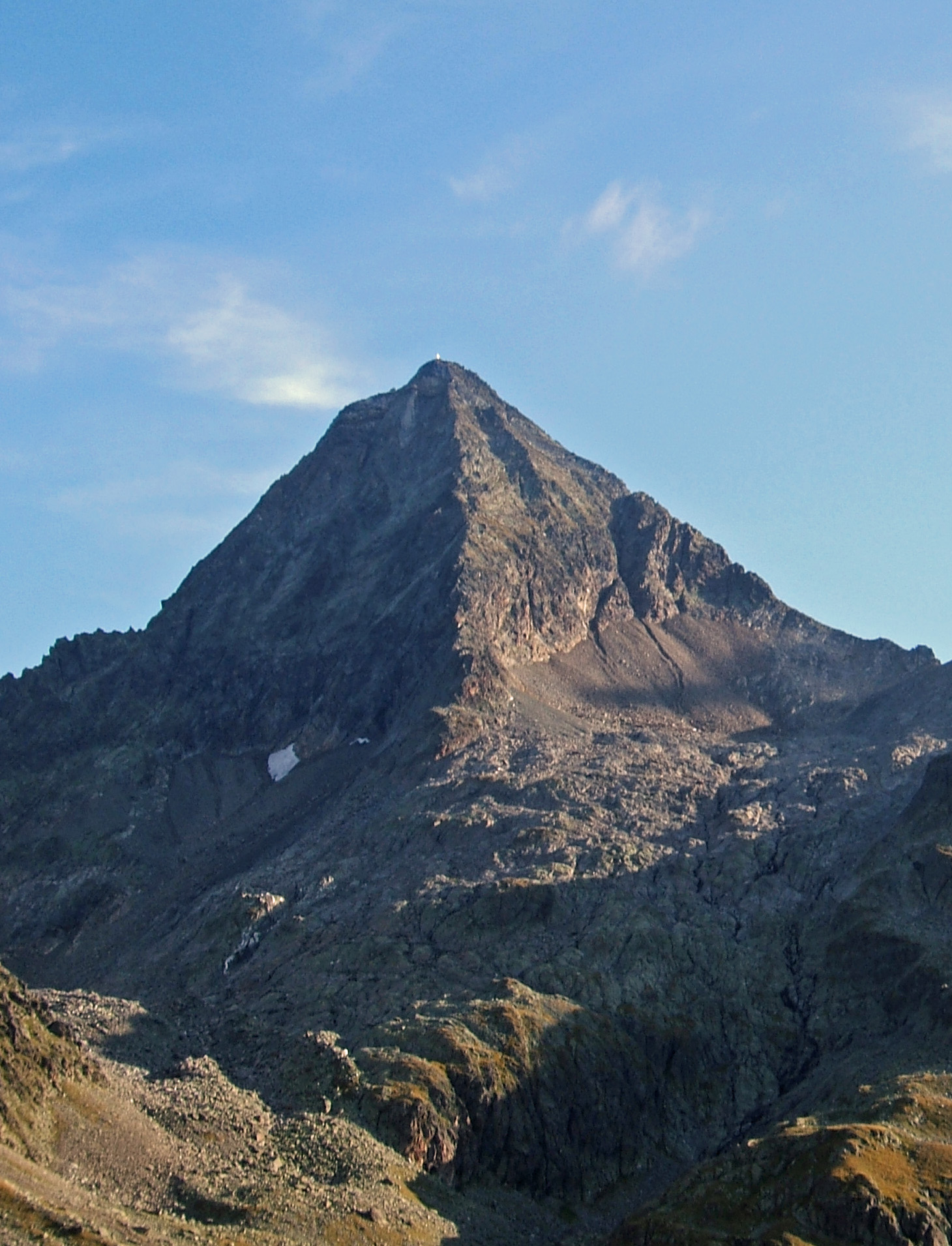
- The Glödis from the south

Highest point
- Elevation: 3,206 m (AA) (10,518 ft)
- Prominence: 376 m ↓ Glödistörl
- Isolation: 1.94 km → Roter Knopf (south arête)
- Listing: Alpine mountains above 3000 m
- Coordinates: 46°57′42″N 12°43′33″E

Geography
- Location within Austria
- Location: East Tyrol, Austria
- Parent range: High Tauern, Schober Group

Climbing
- First ascent: 13 July 1871 by J. Pöschl with guides, Gorgasser and Hutter
- Normal route: Klettersteig along the southeast arête (grade B)

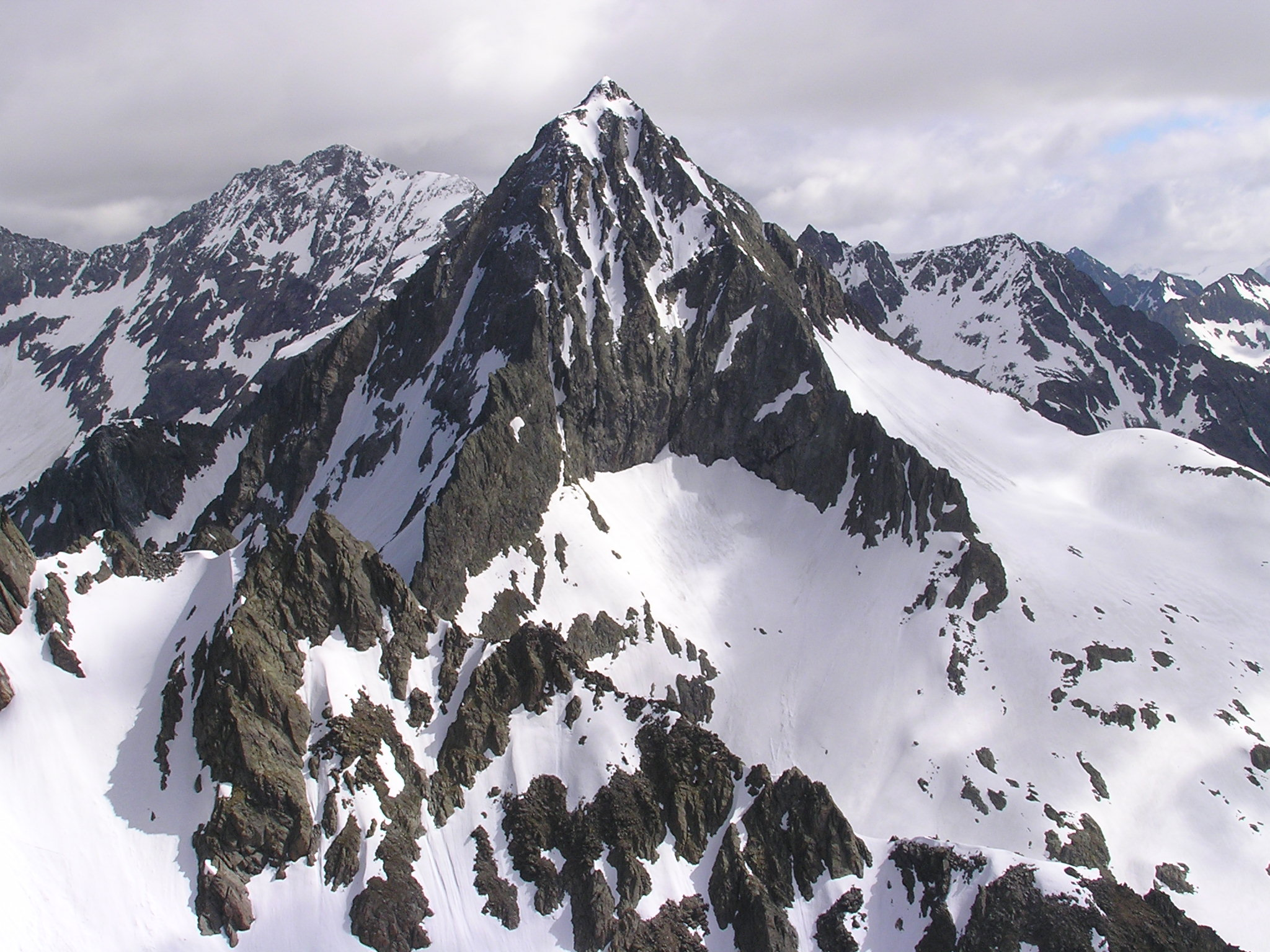
The Glödis seen from the ridge of Debantgrat to the southwest

The Glödis (3,206 m (AA)) is one of the most regularly formed summits in the Schober Group in East Tyrol, hence its sobriquet, the "Matterhorn of the Schober Group". It is an impressive sight both from the Debanttal valley and the valley of Kalser Lesachtal.

== Name ==
Franz Miklosich derives the name from the Slavic word gledna (= "seeing"). According to Heinz Pohl, however, there are 2 possible derivations: either from the early Slovenian glodišće (= "place gnawed away by water", from glodati = "to gnaw"), but this link is phonetically difficult; or more probably from glodež which has a similar meaning.

In the Debanttal valley the mountain was for a long time called the Großer Gößnitzkopf. Its other names include Klöders and Granatkogel.

== Routes ==
The best ascent option is from the Lienzer Hut (1,977 m above sea level (AA)) along the Franz Keil Way, then on to the Kalser Törl and finally along the southeast arête. In autumn 2006 a klettersteig was installed on the southeast ridge which is of moderate difficulty (grade B). Other well known routes are:

- Southwest ridge from the Kalser Törl (II–III, in one place III+), popular, often used
- Northeast ridge from Glödistörl (III-), boulder-strewn
- West ridge (IV–V), most difficult arête of the Glödis
- South ridge (III+), solid rock, rarely used

== Literature and maps ==
- Alpine Club map Sheet 41, 1:25,000, Schobergruppe, ISBN 3-928777-12-2
- Richard Goedeke: 3000er in den Nordalpen, Bruckmann, Munich, 2004, ISBN 3-7654-3930-4
- Georg Zlöbl: Die Dreitausender Osttirols. Verlag Grafik Zloebl, Lienz-Tristach, 2005, ISBN 3-200-00428-2
