= Leisach =

- Municipality
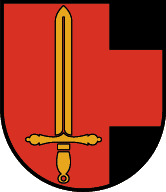
- Coat of arms

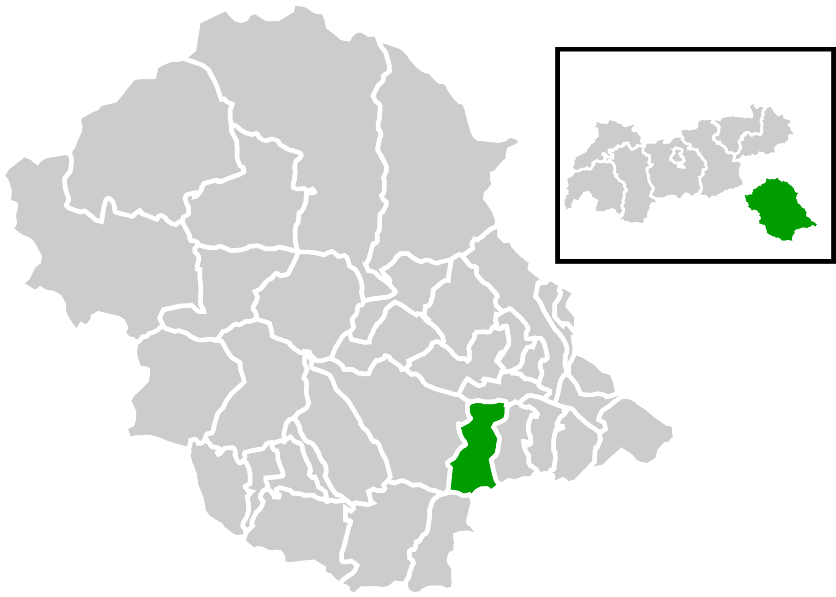
- Location within Lienz district

- Location within Austria
- Coordinates: 46°48′34″N 12°45′00″E
- Country: Austria
- State: Tyrol
- District: Lienz

Government
  - Mayor: Ing. Bernhard M. Zanon

Area
  - Total: 33.28 km^{2} (12.85 sq mi)
- Elevation: 710 m (2,330 ft)

Population (2018-01-01)
  - Total: 729
  - Density: 21.9/km^{2} (56.7/sq mi)
- Time zone: UTC+1 (CET)
  - Summer (DST): UTC+2 (CEST)
- Postal code: 9909
- Area code: 04852
- Vehicle registration: LZ
- Website: www.leisach.tirol.gv.at

Leisach is a municipality in the district of Lienz in the Austrian state of Tyrol.

== Population ==
Historical population
Year	Pop.	±%
1869	500	—
1880	496	−0.8%
1890	424	−14.5%
1900	418	−1.4%
1910	473	+13.2%
1923	455	−3.8%
1934	480	+5.5%
1939	498	+3.8%
1951	561	+12.7%
1961	609	+8.6%
1971	727	+19.4%
1981	799	+9.9%
1991	779	−2.5%
2001	881	+13.1%
2012	824	−6.5%
