= Debantbach =

River in Austria

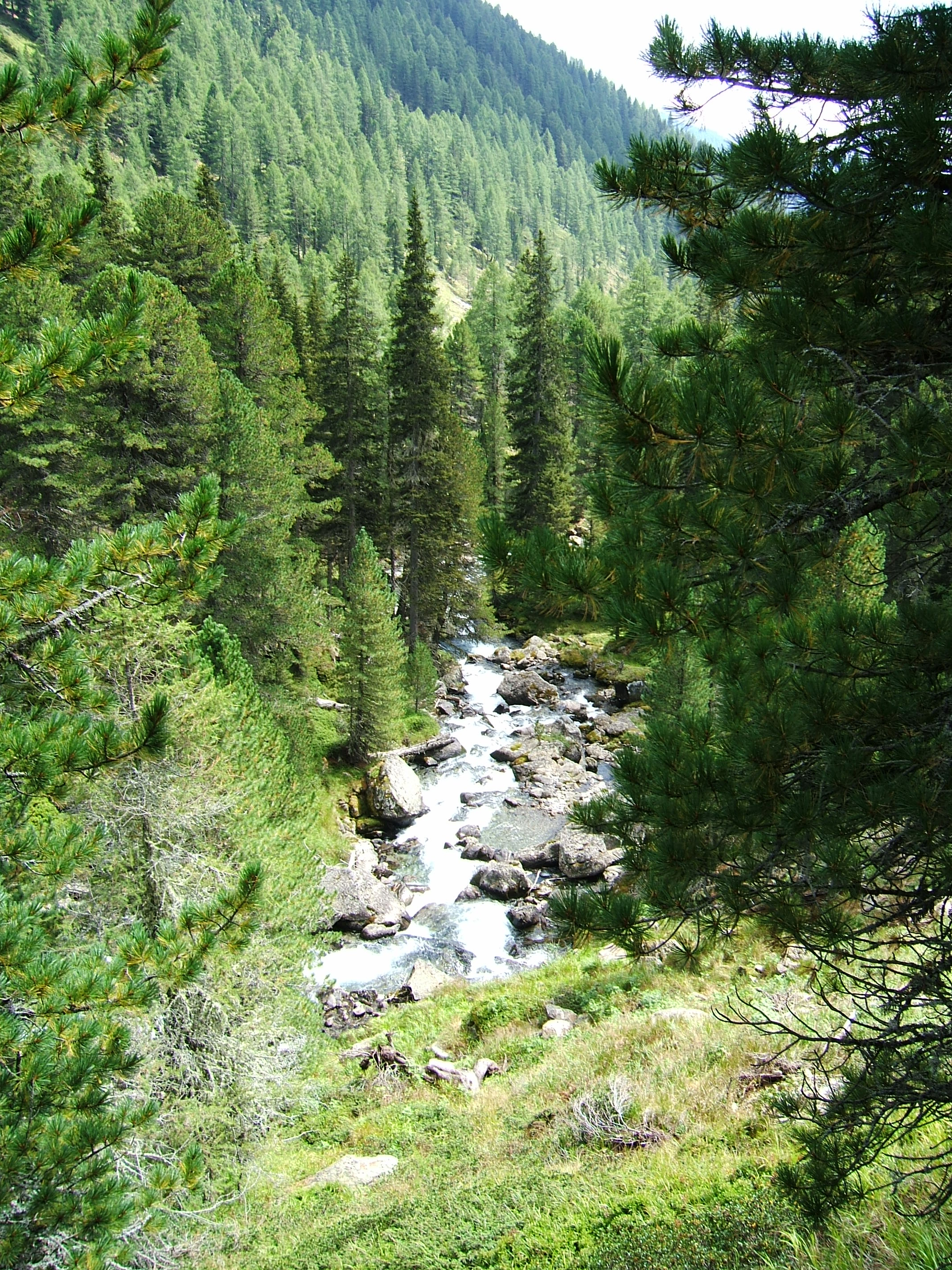
- The Debantbach between Seichenbrunn and Hofalm

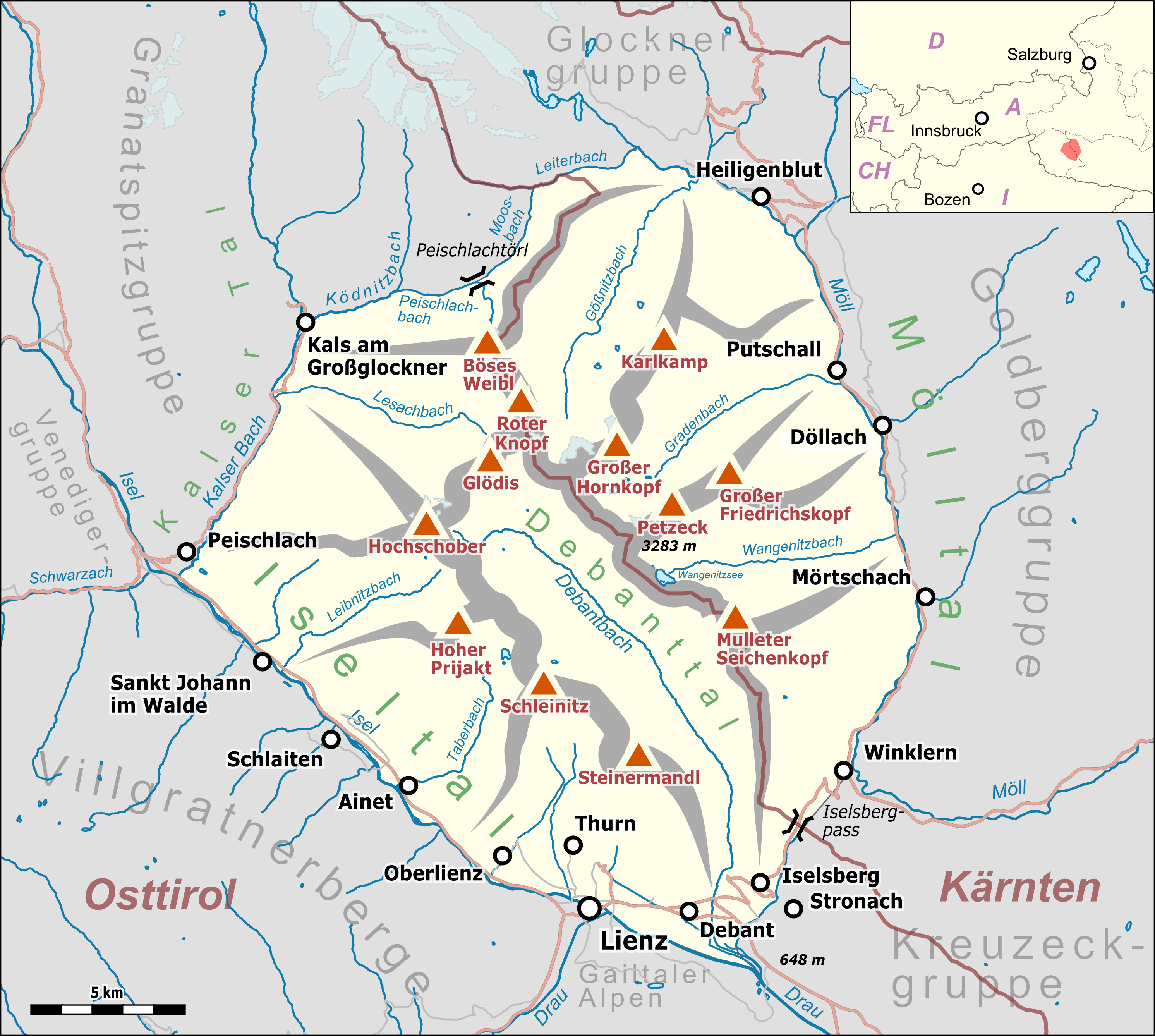
- Location in the Schober Group

- Location of the mouth in Austria

Location
- Country: Austria
- State: Tyrol
- District: Lienz
- Municipalities: Nußdorf-Debant; Iselsberg-Stronach; Dölsach

Physical characteristics
- Source: West of the Hochschober
  - location: East Tyrol, Austria
  - coordinates: 46.939509°N 12.713164°E
  - elevation: 2,540 km (1,580 mi) (AA)
- Mouth: By Dölsach in the Drava
  - location: East Tyrol, Austria
  - coordinates: 46.80827°N 12.842476°E
  - elevation: 650 km (400 mi) (AA)
- Length: 22.3 km (13.9 mi)
- Basin size: 83.3 km^{2} (32.2 mi^{2})

Basin features
- Progression: Drava—Danube—Black Sea
- River system: Danube

The Debantbach is a stream in East Tyrol, Austria. Its source is west of the Hochschober and north of the Leibnitztörl, below the Debantgrat. At the end of the Debanttal Valley, the Debantbach joins the Gößnitzbach and then flows through the Debanttal and into the Drava at Dölsach. The Debantbach descends a total of 1,890 m (6,200 ft) from its source to its mouth, and it has a total length of 22.3 km (13.9 mi). Its drainage basin is 83.3 km^{2} (32.2 sq mi). It takes in a total of 48 bodies of water (including tributaries and their tributaries).

== History ==
=== Naming Etymology ===
Different etymologies have been suggested for the name "Debant". One possibility is that it comes from a Celtic place name, such as Deva or Debana, ultimately deriving from the Latin divius ("divine"). Another suggestion is that the name is derived from the Slavic root djeva ("girl").

=== Historical Course ===
It is believed that the course of the Debantbach stream was once further west and to have flowed to the right at the gorge exit towards Lienz. In the last centuries of the first millennium AD, the former urban area of Aguntum experienced multiple floods, which resulted in a thick layer of sand, gravel, and debris covering the area. However, the course of the Debantbach stream on the alluvial fan in the Isel Valley, at the time of Aguntum, could not be accurately reconstructed.

Records from the 19th-century chronicle major flood events at the Debantbach stream, including those in 1881, 1882, 1885, and 1890. In 1965 and 1966, the Debantbach almost broke its banks in the direction of Lienz, leading to an increased level of flood protection to prevent an eruption caused by a 150-year flood.

== Geography ==
=== Geology ===
The Debantbach predominantly flows through a uniform formation of crystalline slate. In the estuary area, however, the stream runs through gravel and sand deposited by the Drava.

=== Course ===
The Debantbach is a stream originating in the Hohe Tauern National Park at an elevation of 2540 meters west of the Hochschober and below the southern Leibnitzörl in the municipality of Nußdorf-Debant. It flows in a westerly direction through a varied landscape with changing geography before uniting with the Gößnitzbach and other smaller streams at the head of the Debant valley. The stream then runs in a southeasterly direction through the Debant valley, passing the Hofalm, Gaimberger Alm, and Gaimberger Schäferhütte within the national park. After passing the Roracher Alm, the Debantbach reaches the border between the municipalities of Nußdorf-Debant and Iselsberg-Stronach, which it follows until it leaves the Debant valley through the Debant Gorge and reaches the Drava in a wide alluvial cone near the district of Kapaun.
