= Schober group =

Sub-range in the Central Eastern Alps

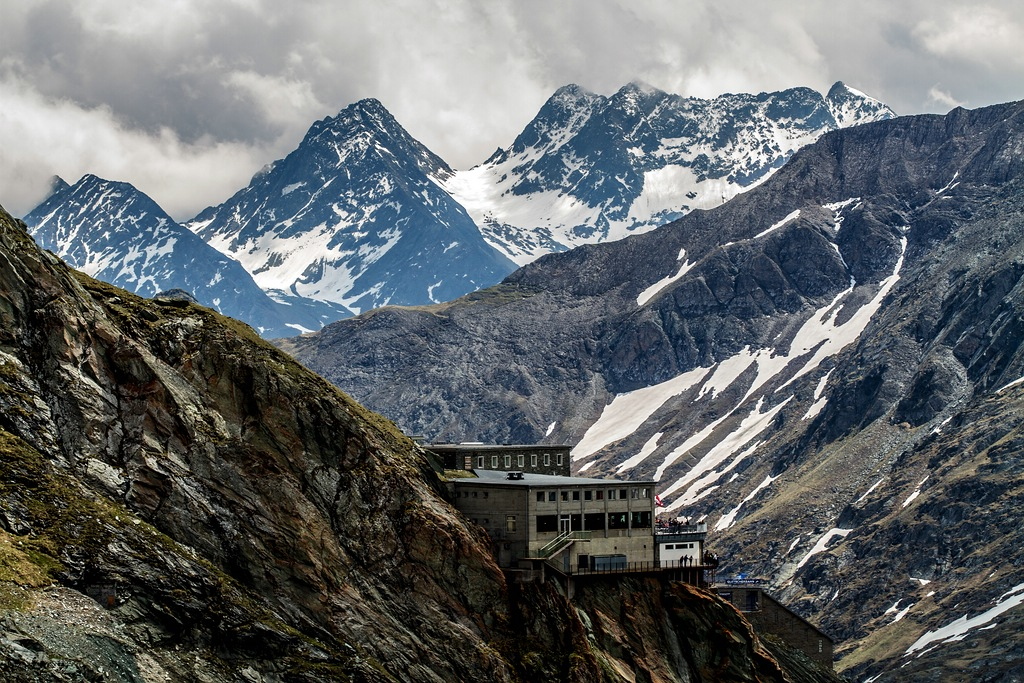
- Northeastern part of the Schober group, view from Grossglockner High Alpine Road with the Alwitzsch, Bretterköpfen, Hoher Seekamp and Karlkamp (from the left)

Highest point
- Peak: Petzeck
- Elevation: 3,283 m (10,771 ft)
- Coordinates: 46°56′54″N 12°48′15″E

Naming
- Native name: Schobergruppe (German)

Geography
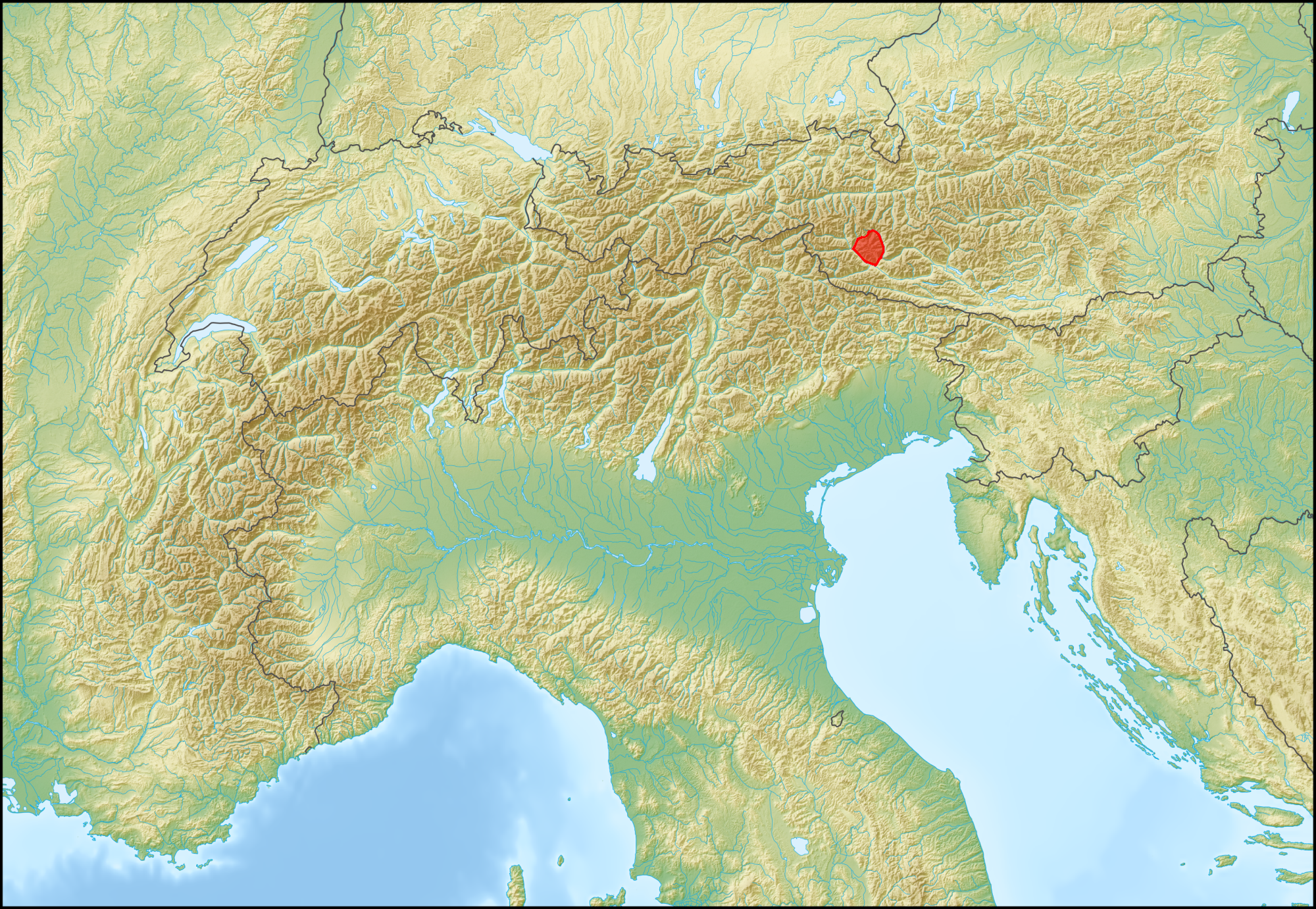
- Schober group (in red) within the Alps. The borders of the range according to Alpine Club classification of the Eastern Alps
- Country: Austria
- States: Tyrol and Carinthia
- Parent range: Hohe Tauern

The Schober group (German: Schobergruppe) is a sub-range of the Hohe Tauern mountains in the Central Eastern Alps, on the border between the Austrian states of Tyrol (East Tyrol) and Carinthia. Most of the range is located inside Hohe Tauern national park. It is named after Mt. Hochschober, 3,242 metres (10,636 ft), though its highest peak is Mt. Petzeck at 3,283 metres (10,771 ft).

== Geography ==
The range comprises central parts of the Hohe Tauern south of the neighbouring Glockner Group and the Alpine divide. In the south it stretches down to the East Tyrolean capital Lienz and the Drava Valley. In the east, the Grossglockner High Alpine Road leads up to Hochtor Pass via Großkirchheim.

== Neighbouring ranges ==
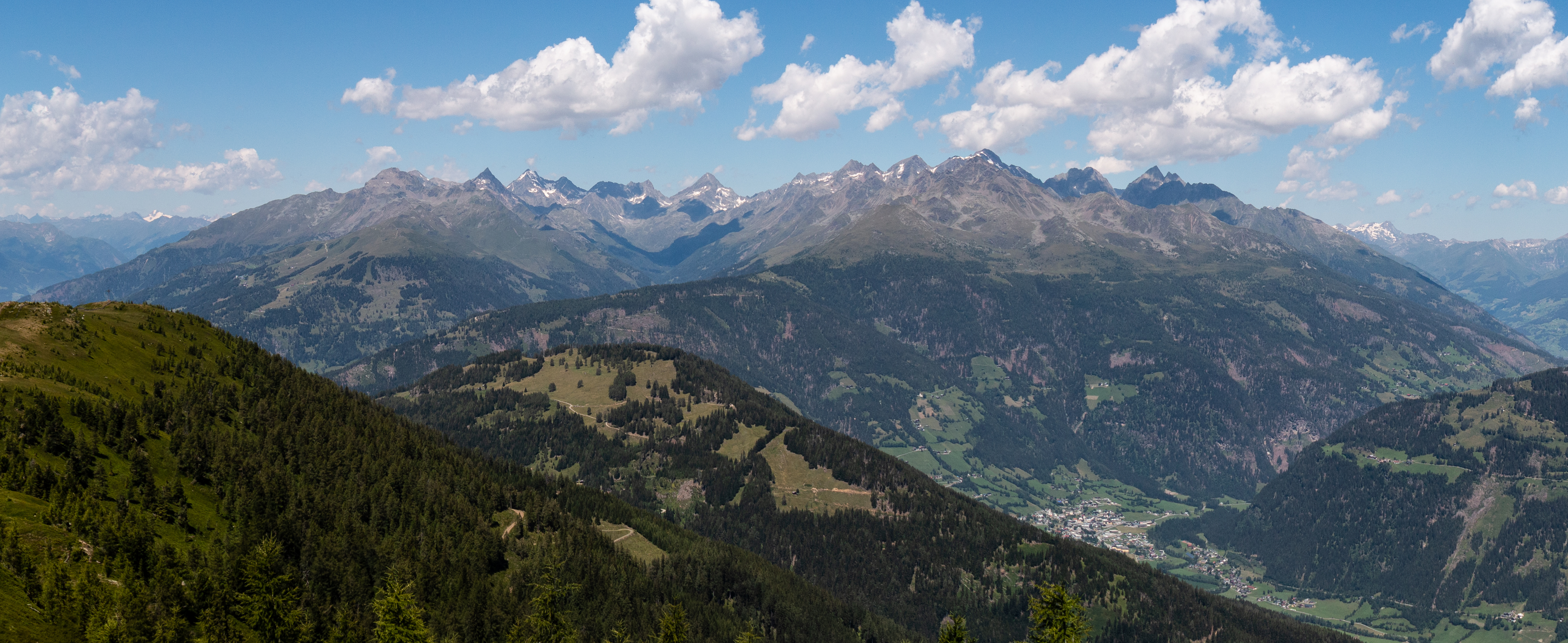
The Schober group seen from the Kreuzeck group

The Schober group is bordered by the following other ranges in the Alps:

- Glockner Group (to the north)
- Goldberg Group (to the east)
- Kreuzeck group (to the SE)
- Gailtal Alps (to the S)
- Villgraten Mountains (to the SW)
- Granatspitze Group (to the NW)

== Peaks ==
All the named three-thousanders in the Schober group:

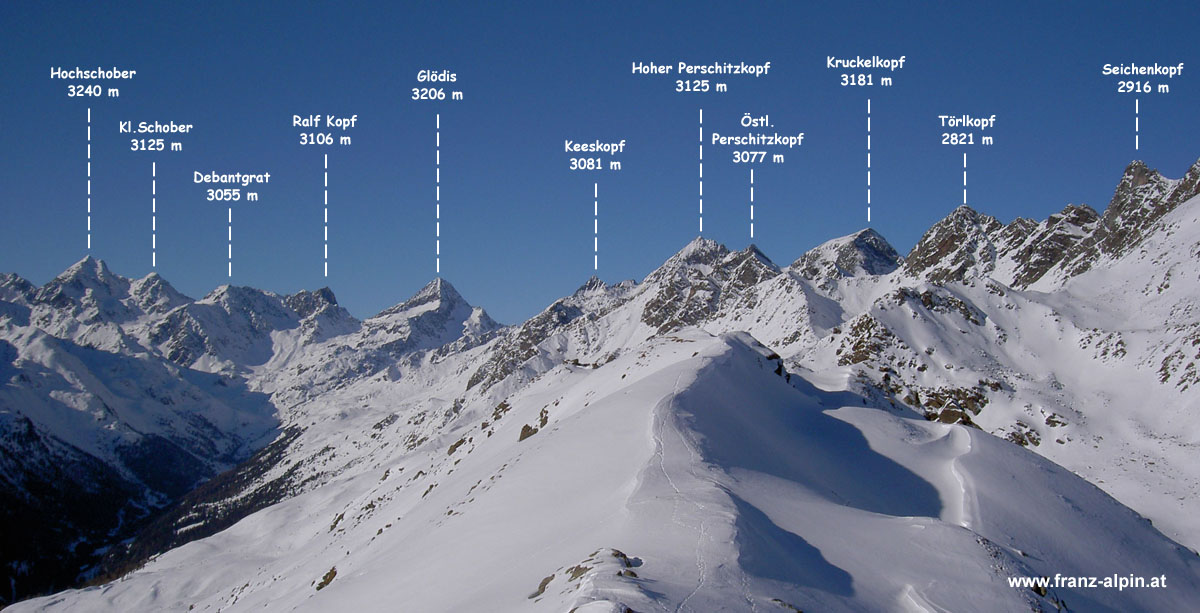
The Schober group from Straßboden (2,401 m). Left: the Debanttal.

- Petzeck 3,283 m above sea level (AA)
- Roter Knopf 3,281 m above sea level (AA)
- Großer Hornkopf 3,251 m above sea level (AA)
- Hochschober 3,242 m above sea level (AA)
- Glödis 3,206 m above sea level (AA)
- Kleiner Hornkopf 3,194 m above sea level (AA)
- Kruckelkopf 3,181 m above sea level (AA)
- Kristallkopf 3,160 m above sea level (AA)
- Klammerköpfe max. 3,155 m above sea level (AA)
- Großer Friedrichskopf 3,134 m above sea level (AA)
- Hoher Perschitzkopf 3,125 m above sea level (AA)
- Böses Weibl 3,119 m above sea level (AA)
- Kleinschober 3,119 m above sea level (AA)
- Northern Talleitenspitze 3,115 m above sea level (AA)
- Karlkamp 3,114 m above sea level (AA)
- Southern Talleitenspitze 3,113 m above sea level (AA)
- Hoher Seekamp 3,112 m above sea level (AA)
- Ralfkopf 3,106 m above sea level (AA)
- Ganot 3,102 m above sea level (AA)
- Kreuzkopf 3,102 m above sea level (AA)
- Gößnitzkopf 3,096 m above sea level (AA)
- Rotspitzen max. 3,096 m above sea level (AA)
- Georgskopf 3,090 m above sea level (AA)
- Ruiskopf 3,090 m above sea level (AA)
- Hohes Beil 3,086 m above sea level (AA)
- Keeskopf 3,081 m above sea level (AA)
- Bretterköpfe max. 3,078 m above sea level (AA)
- Hoher Prijakt 3,064 m above sea level (AA)
- Kleiner Friedrichskopf 3,059 m above sea level (AA)
- Niederer Prijakt 3,056 m above sea level (AA)
- Debantgrat 3,055 m above sea level (AA)
- Alkuser Rotspitze 3,053 m above sea level (AA)
- Gridenkarköpfe max. 3,031 m above sea level (AA)
- Kögele 3,030 m above sea level (AA)
- Brentenköpfe max. 3,019 m above sea level (AA)
- Tschadinhorn 3,016 m above sea level (AA)

== Alpine huts ==
- Adolf-Noßberger Hut
- Elberfelder Hut
- Gernot-Röhr Bothy
- Gößnitzkopf Bothy
- Hochschober Hut
- Lienzer Hut
- Wangenitzsee Hut
- Winklerner Hut

== Accident ==
On 8 September 2016 shortly after takeoff on the return leg of a supply flight to the Elberfelder Hut, a helicopter crashed, and the pilot, Hannes Arch, was killed. The hut manager, who had spontaneously decided to accompany Arch, was injured but was able to be rescued.

== Maps ==
- Alpine Club map 41 Schobergruppe. Deutscher Alpenverein: Munich, 2005, ISBN 3-928777-12-2.

== Literature ==
- Gerhard Karl, Michael Krobath: "Die Schobergruppe, ein stilles Kleinod der Hohen Tauern" in: Berg 2006 (Alpine Club Yearbook, Vol. 130) with Alpine Club map 41 of the Schober group, ISBN 3-937530-10-X, pp. 270–283.
- Walter Mair: Alpenvereinsführer Schobergruppe. Bergverlag Rudolf Rother: Munich, 1979, ISBN 3-7633-1222-6.
