= Hochschober =

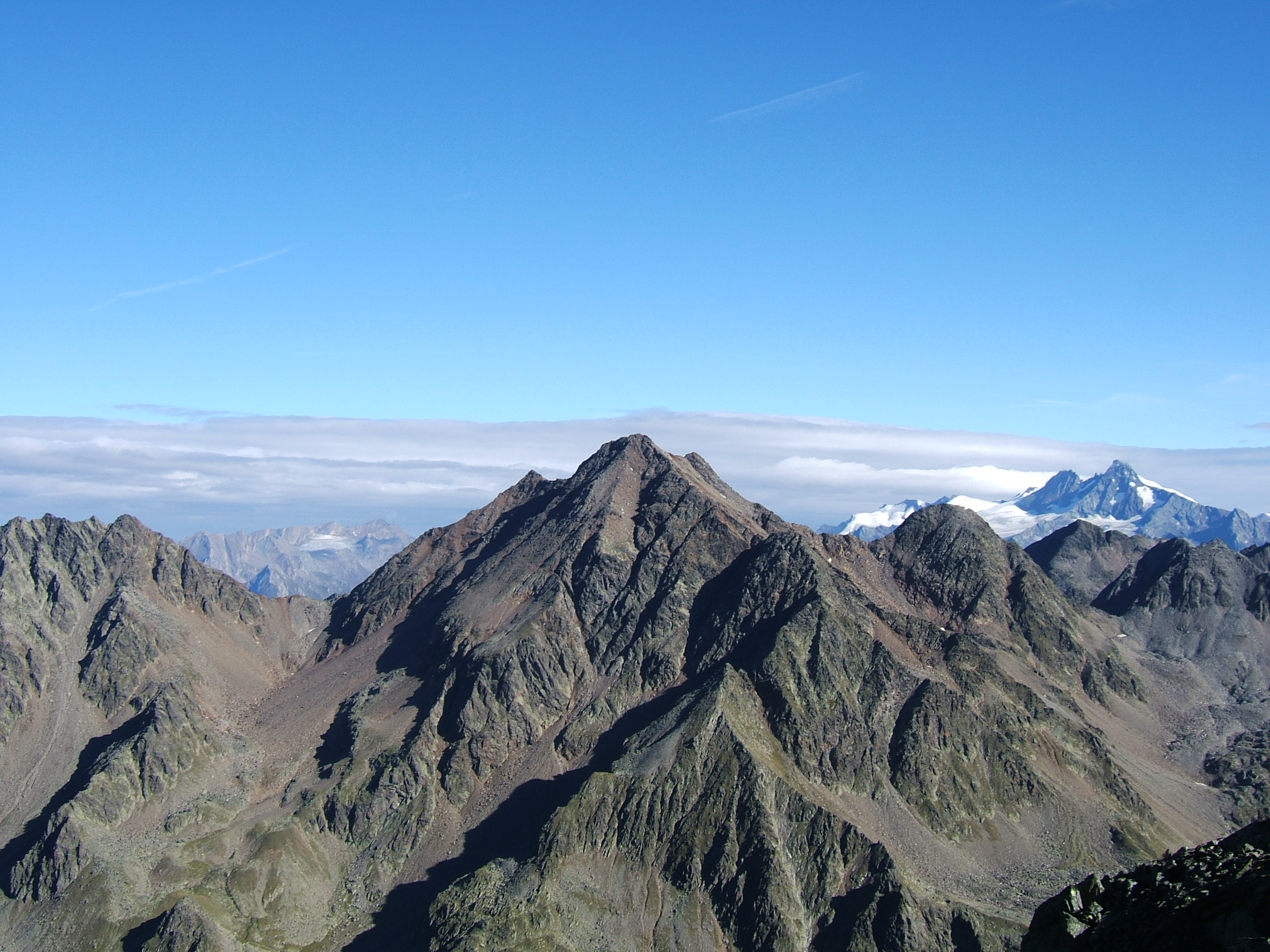
- The Hochschober from the south, from the Hoher Prijakt

Highest point
- Elevation: 3,240 m (AA) (10,630 ft)
- Prominence: 431 m ↓ Kalser Törl
- Isolation: 4.97 km → Roter Knopf
- Listing: Alpine mountains above 3000 m
- Coordinates: 46°56′34″N 12°41′54″E

Geography
- Location within Austria
- Location: East Tyrol, Austria
- Parent range: High Tauern, Schober Group

Climbing
- First ascent: 18 August 1852 by Franz Keil and guide, Paul Oblasser, and party
- Normal route: From the south to the Staniskascharte notch, then along the western arête (I)

The Hochschober (3,240 m (AA)) is the mountain that gives its name to the Schober Group in the High Tauern, although the summit is only the fourth highest in the group. This may have arisen because the north face of the mountain is an impressive sight from Kals.

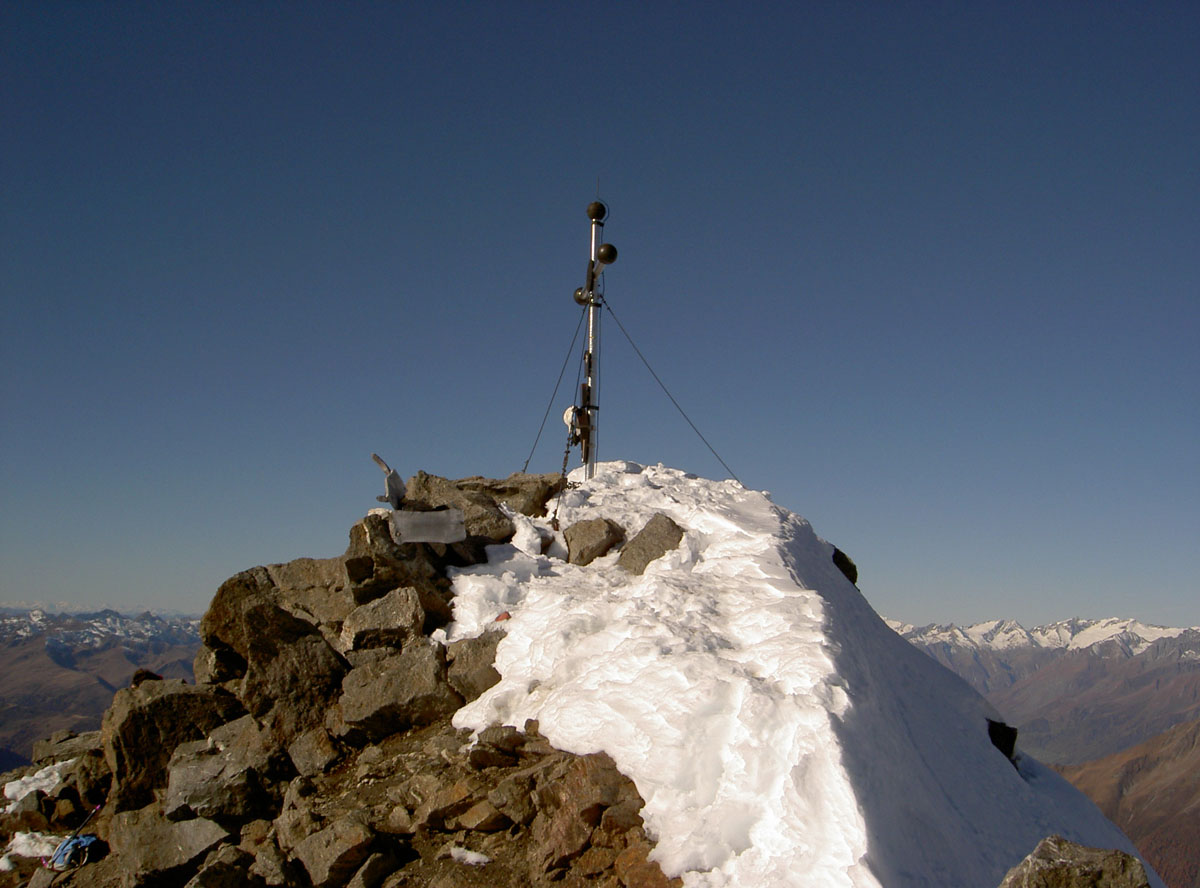
The summit cross on the Hochschober

The easiest ascent is via the Hochschober Hut (2,322 m) from the south to the Staniskascharte notch (2,936 m) and along the western arête. There is another route of comparable difficulty from the east and along the upper part of the southeastern arête. The latter route may use the Lienzer Hut (1,977 m) as a base. Both routes are waymarked and now generally free of snow in the high summer, unlike earlier years, have easy klettersteig ratings (I) and are somewhat exposed in places. Another ascent option is the partly waymarked climb from the Schobertörl (2,898 m) along the northeastern arête, crossing the Kleinschober (3,125 m).

== Literature and map ==
- Alpin Club Map Sheet 41, 1:25,000 series, Schobergruppe, ISBN 3-928777-12-2
- Richard Goedeke: 3000er in den Nordalpen, Bruckmann, Munich, 2004, ISBN 3-7654-3930-4
- Walter Mair: Alpenvereinsführer Schobergruppe. Bergverlag Rudolf Rother, Munich, 1979. ISBN 3-7633-1222-6
