= Petzeck =

Austrian mountain

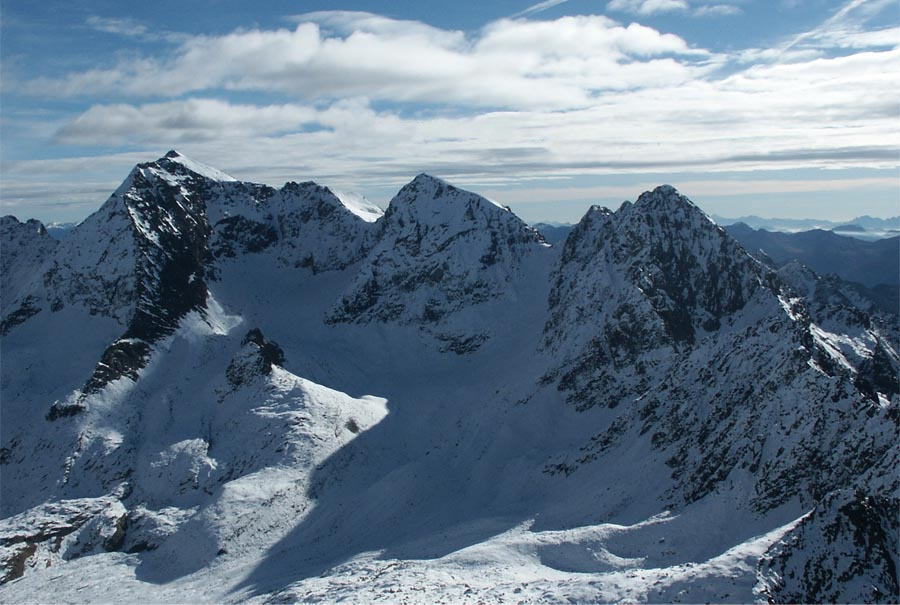
- Petzeck (far left)

Highest point
- Elevation: 3,283 m (10,771 ft)
- Prominence: 799 m (2,621 ft)
- Listing: Alpine mountains above 3000 m
- Coordinates: 46°56′53″N 12°48′14″E

Geography
- Location within Alps
- Location: Carinthia, Austria
- Parent range: High Tauern

Climbing
- First ascent: 1844

Petzeck (3,283m) is the highest mountain of the Schober Group in the High Tauern range, Austria. The mountain has a 1,000m high north face but its southern slope is more gentle, with lakes such as Kreuzsee and Wangenitzsee on its slopes. Its south western slope is glaciated.

The mountain is quieter than its near neighbours such as Grossglockner or Hoher Sonnblick.
