= Dölsach =

- Municipality
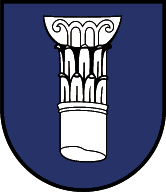
- Coat of arms

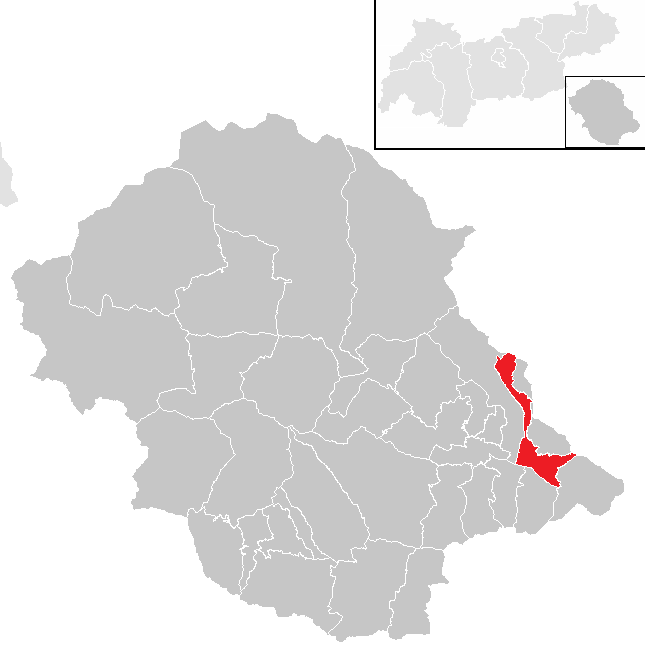
- Location within Lienz district

- Location within Austria
- Coordinates: 46°49′40″N 12°50′25″E
- Country: Austria
- State: Tyrol
- District: Lienz

Government
  - Mayor: Martin Mayerl (ÖVP)

Area
  - Total: 24.16 km^{2} (9.33 sq mi)
- Elevation: 731 m (2,398 ft)

Population (2021)
  - Total: 2,303
  - Density: 95.32/km^{2} (246.9/sq mi)
- Time zone: UTC+1 (CET)
  - Summer (DST): UTC+2 (CEST)
- Postal code: 9991
- Area code: 04852
- Vehicle registration: LZ
- Website: www.doelsach.at

Dölsach is a municipality in the district of Lienz in the Austrian state of Tyrol.

== Population ==
Historical population
Year	Pop.	±%
1869	930	—
1880	998	+7.3%
1890	917	−8.1%
1900	845	−7.9%
1910	1,017	+20.4%
1923	949	−6.7%
1934	1,232	+29.8%
1939	1,379	+11.9%
1951	1,482	+7.5%
1961	1,498	+1.1%
1971	1,752	+17.0%
1981	1,907	+8.8%
1991	2,049	+7.4%
2001	2,189	+6.8%
2011	2,292	+4.7%
