= Drainage divide =

Elevated terrain that separates neighbouring drainage basins

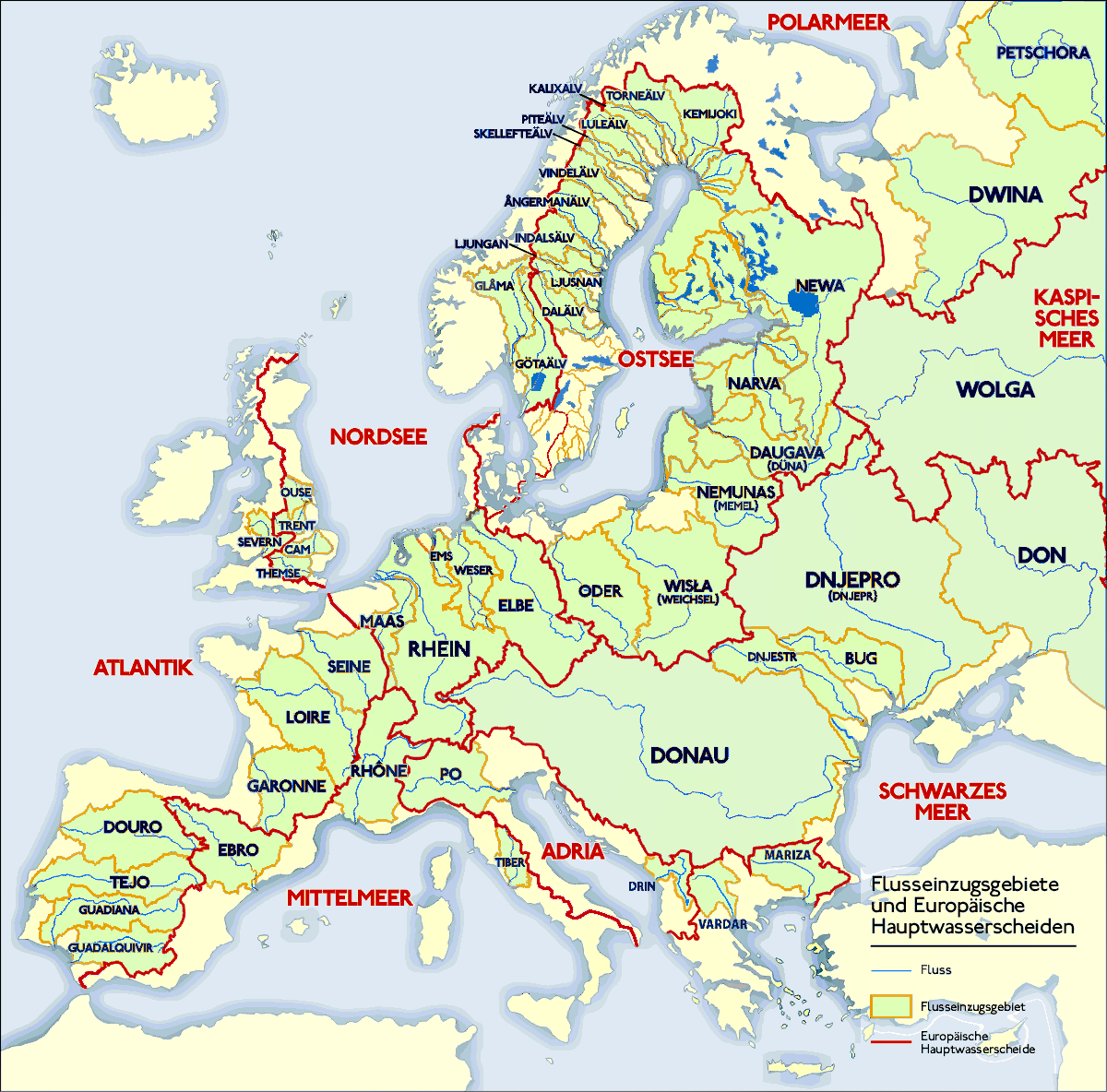
Major drainage divides (yellow and red ridgelines) and drainage basins (green regions) in Europe

A drainage divide, water divide, ridgeline, watershed, water parting or height of land is elevated terrain that separates neighboring drainage basins. On rugged land, the divide lies along topographical ridges, and may be in the form of a single range of hills or mountains, known as a dividing range. On flat terrain, especially where the ground is marshy, the divide may be difficult to discern.

A triple divide is a point, often a summit, where three drainage basins meet. A valley floor divide is a low drainage divide that runs across a valley, sometimes created by deposition or stream capture. Major divides separating rivers that drain to different seas or oceans are continental divides.

The term height of land is used in Canada and the United States to refer to a drainage divide. It is frequently used in border descriptions, which are set according to the "doctrine of natural boundaries". In glaciated areas it often refers to a low point on a divide where it is possible to portage a canoe from one river system to another.

== Types ==
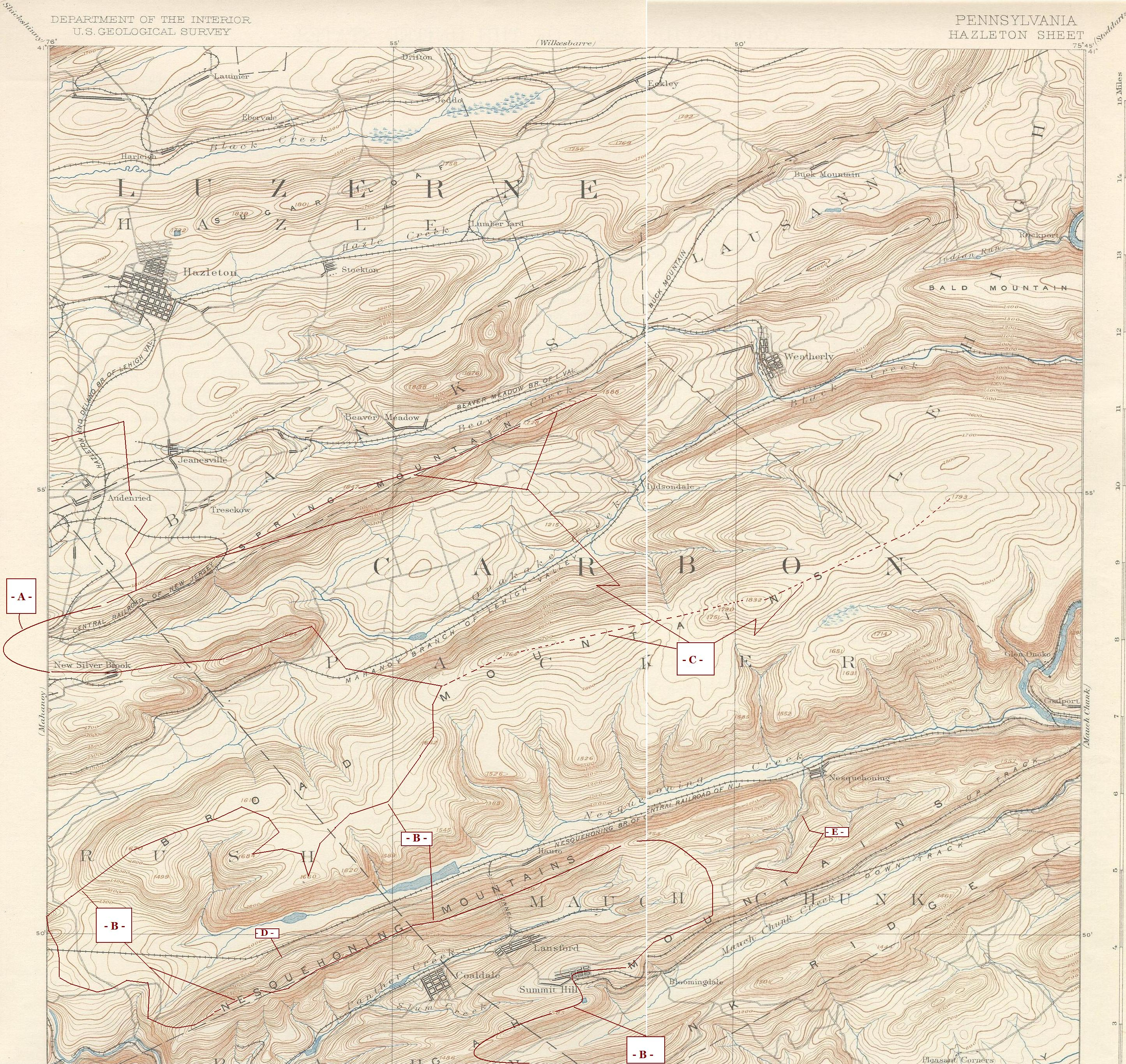
USGS map of Schuylkill-Lehigh River drainage divides

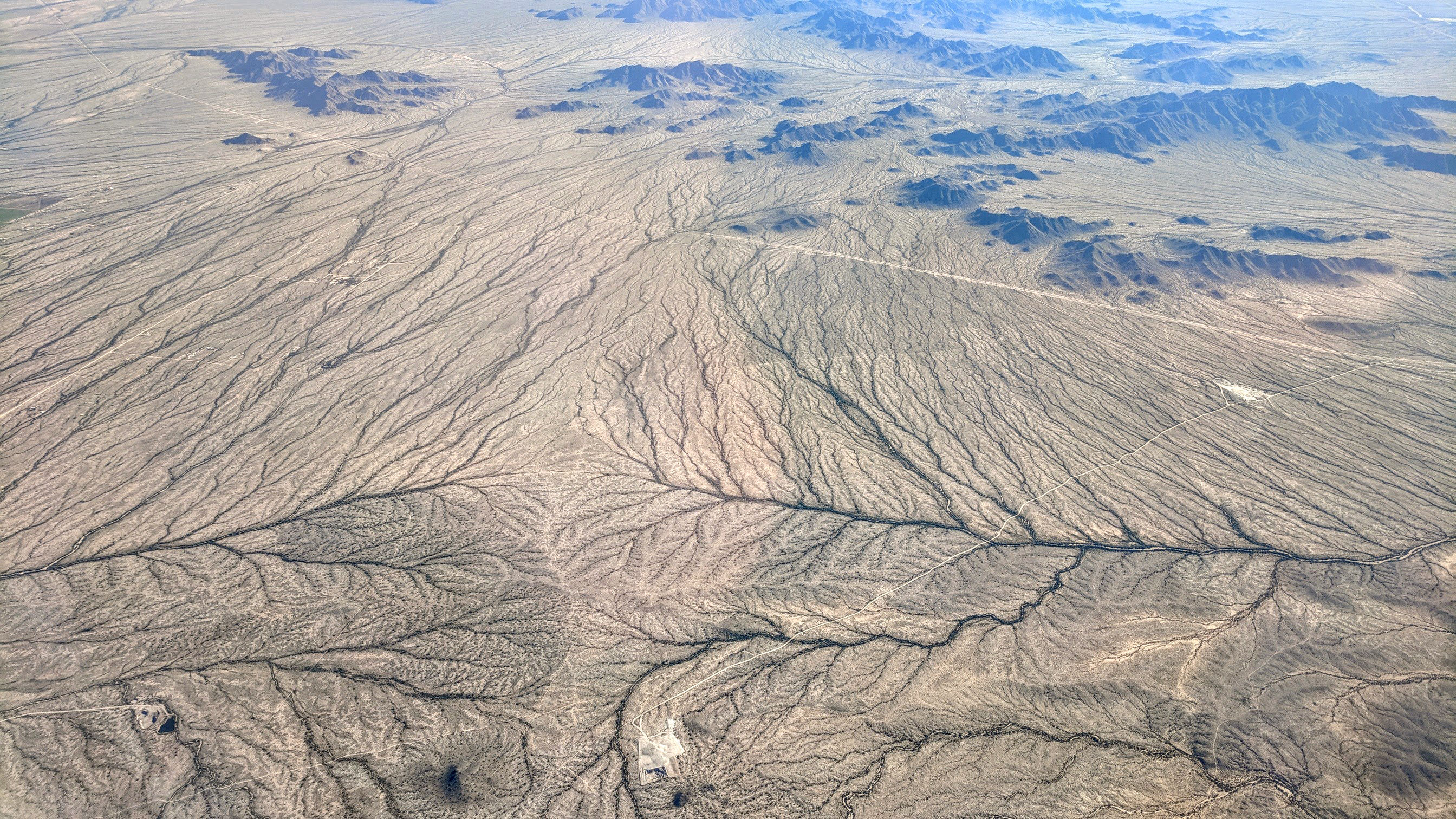
A minor drainage divide south of Buckeye, Arizona. Both branches flow to the Gila River.

Drainage divides can be divided into three types:

- Continental divides in which waters on each side flow to different oceans, such as the Continental Divide of the Americas and the Congo-Nile Divide.
- Major drainage divides in which waters on each side of the divide never meet but flow into the same ocean, such as the divide between the Yellow River basin and the Yangtze. Another, more subtle example is the Schuylkill-Lehigh divide at Pisgah Mountain in Pennsylvania in which two minor creeks divide to flow and grow east and west respectively joining the Lehigh River and Delaware River (and emptying into the Atlantic Ocean via Delaware Bay) or the Susquehanna River and Potomac River (then into the Atlantic via Chesapeake Bay).
- Minor drainage divides in which waters are originally separate but eventually join at a river confluence, such as the Mississippi River and the Missouri River drainage divides.

== Valley-floor divides ==
Labeled figure of a drainage basin.

A valley-floor divide occurs on the bottom of a valley and arises as a result of subsequent deposition, such as scree, in a valley through which a river originally flowed continuously.

Examples include the Kartitsch Saddle in the Gail valley in East Tyrol, which forms the watershed between the Drau and the Gail, and the divides in the Toblacher Feld between Innichen and Toblach in Italy, where the Drau empties into the Black Sea and the Rienz into the Adriatic.

Settlements are often built on valley-floor divides in the Alps. Examples are Eben im Pongau, Kirchberg in Tirol and Waidring (In all of these, the village name indicates the pass and the watershed is even explicitly displayed in the coat of arms). Extremely low divides with heights of less than two metres are found on the North German Plain within the Urstromtäler, for example, between Havel and Finow in the Eberswalde Urstromtal. In marsh deltas such as the Okavango, the largest drainage area on earth, or in large lakes areas, such as the Finnish Lakeland, it is difficult to find a meaningful definition of a watershed.

A bifurcation is where the watershed is effectively in a river bed, in a wetland, or underground. The largest watershed of this type is the bifurcation of the Orinoco in the north of South America, whose main stream empties into the Caribbean, but which also drains into the South Atlantic via the Casiquiare canal and Amazon River.

== Political boundaries ==
Since ridgelines are sometimes easy to see and agree about, drainage divides may form natural borders defining political boundaries, as with the Royal Proclamation of 1763 in British North America which coincided with the ridgeline of the Appalachian Mountains forming the Eastern Continental Divide that separated settled colonial lands in the east from Indian Territory to the west. Another instance of a border matching a watershed in modern times involves the western border between Labrador and Quebec, as arbitrated by the privy council in 1927.

== Portages and canals ==
Drainage divides hinder waterway navigation. In pre-industrial times, water divides were crossed at portages. Later, canals connected adjoining drainage basins; a key problem in such canals is ensuring a sufficient water supply. Important examples are the Chicago Portage, connecting the Great Lakes and Mississippi by the Chicago Sanitary and Ship Canal, and the Canal des Deux Mers in France, connecting the Atlantic and the Mediterranean. The name is enshrined at the Height of Land Portage on the route from the Great Lakes in the Atlantic drainage basin to the Hudson Bay drainage basin.

== See also ==
- List of watershed topics – Watershed terms and topics
- River source – Starting point of a river
