= Große Sandspitze =

Mountain in Tyrol, Austria

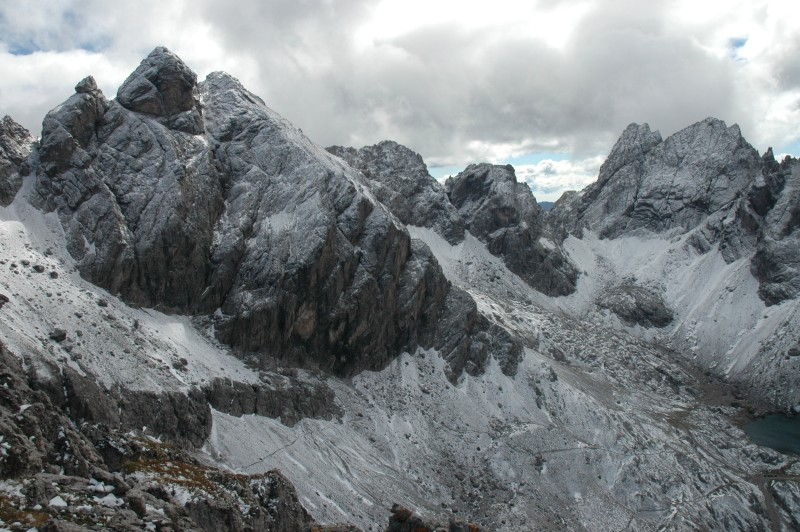

Highest point
- Elevation: 2,770 m (AA) (9,090 ft)
- Prominence: 2,770-1,525 m ↓ Kartitsch Saddle
- Isolation: 15.0 km → Schleinitz
- Listing: Highest peak in the Gailtal Alps
- Coordinates: 46°46′00″N 12°48′42″E

Geography
- Location within Austria
- Location: Tyrol, Austria
- Parent range: Lienz Dolomites

Climbing
- First ascent: 2 July 1886 by Franz Mitterhofer

The Große Sandspitze in Tyrol is 2,770 m (AA) and the highest mountain in the Gailtal Alps, a mountain range of the Southern Limestone Alps. It is located within the subrange of the Lienz Dolomites and is locally called the Sunnspitz.

== First ascent ==
The first ascent of the Große Sandspitze was made by Franz Mitterhofer, a farmer from Tristach, known as Kreitmeier, on 2 July 1886. The first recreational ascent was by August Kolp and Ignaz Linder, a little later, on 20 July 1886. The standard route, used by the first climbers, is rated as climbing grade II.

== Literature ==
- Peterka, Hubert and End, Willi (1984). Alpenvereinsführer Lienzer Dolomiten, Bergverlag Rother, Munich, ISBN 3-7633-1243-9
