= Tristach =

- Municipality
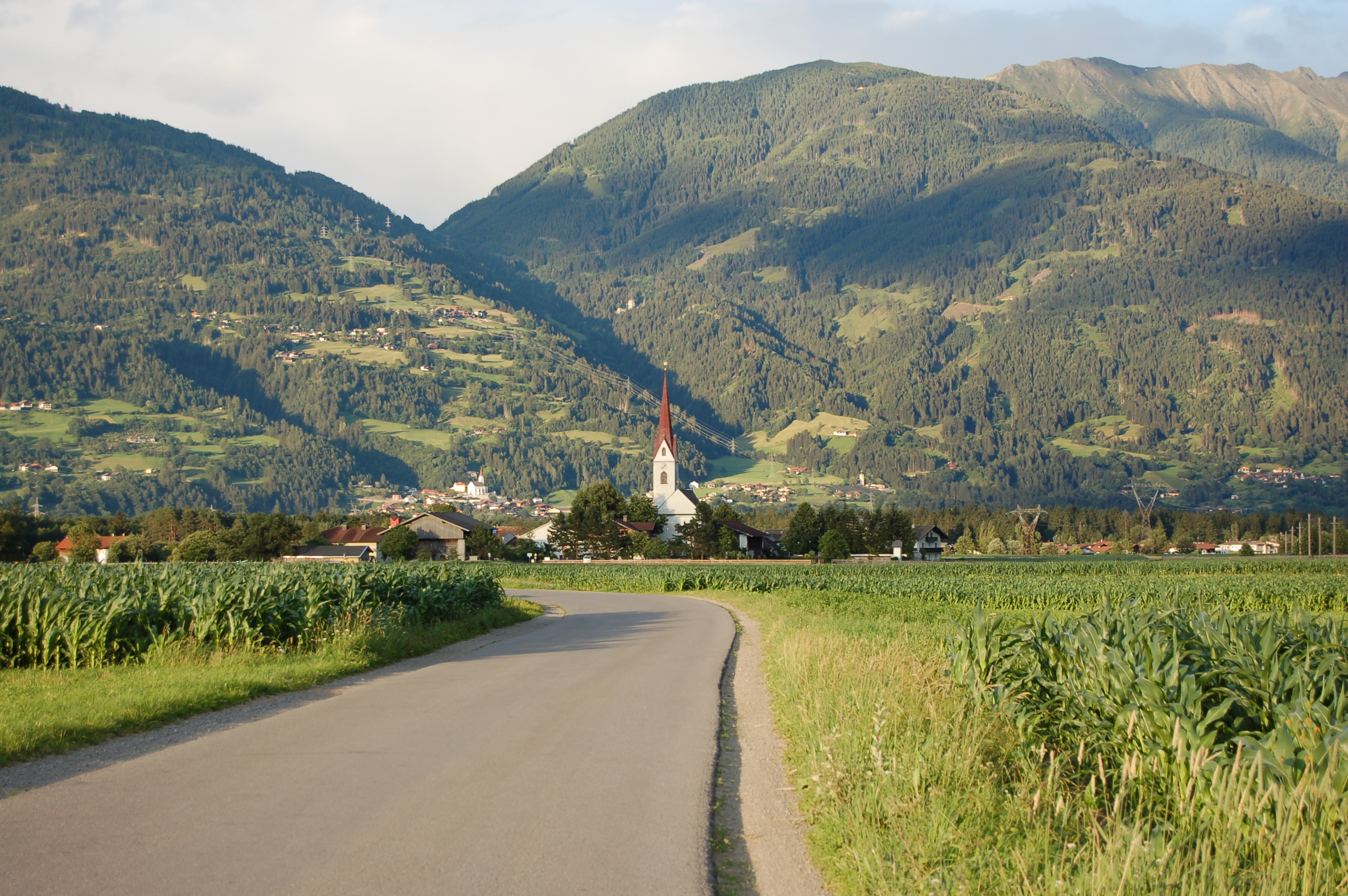
- View from the west

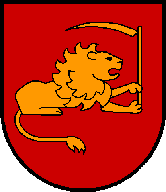
- Coat of arms

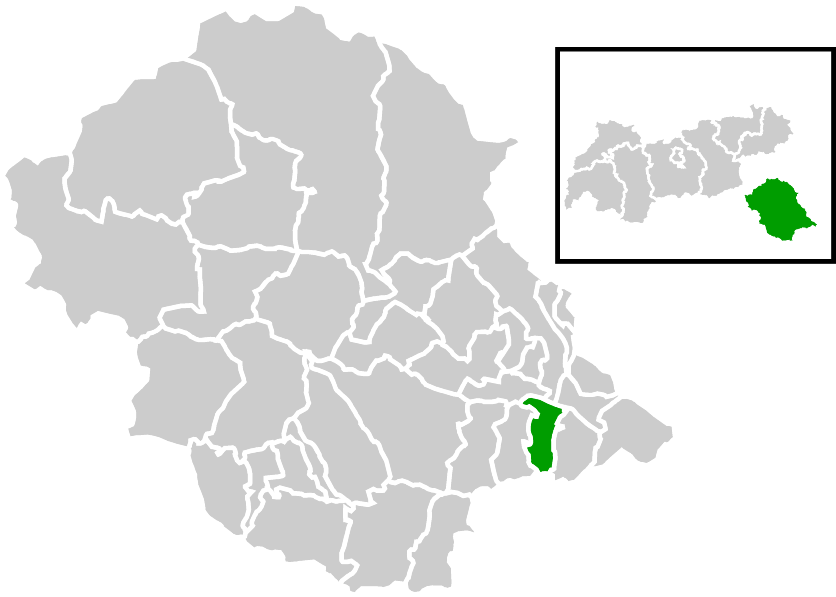
- Location within Lienz district

- Location within Austria
- Coordinates: 46°49′02″N 12°47′15″E
- Country: Austria
- State: Tyrol
- District: Lienz

Government
  - Mayor: Alois Walder

Area
  - Total: 18.8 km^{2} (7.3 sq mi)
- Elevation: 672 m (2,205 ft)

Population (2021)
  - Total: 1,461
  - Density: 77.7/km^{2} (201/sq mi)
- Time zone: UTC+1 (CET)
  - Summer (DST): UTC+2 (CEST)
- Postal code: 9900
- Area code: 04852
- Vehicle registration: LZ
- Website: www.tristach.at

Tristach is a municipality in the district of Lienz in the Austrian state of Tyrol.

== Geography ==
The municipal area stretches from the Drava valley and the suburbs of Lienz southwards up to the Große Sandspitze mountain and the crest of the Gailtal Alps (Lienz Dolomites), the border with Carinthia. It comprises Tristacher See, the only bathing lake in East Tyrol.

== Population ==
Historical population
Year	Pop.	±%
1869	323	—
1880	351	+8.7%
1890	355	+1.1%
1900	354	−0.3%
1910	357	+0.8%
1923	373	+4.5%
1934	446	+19.6%
1939	518	+16.1%
1951	672	+29.7%
1961	655	−2.5%
1971	895	+36.6%
1981	1,105	+23.5%
1991	1,181	+6.9%
2001	1,243	+5.2%
2012	1,410	+13.4%
