= Spitzkofel =

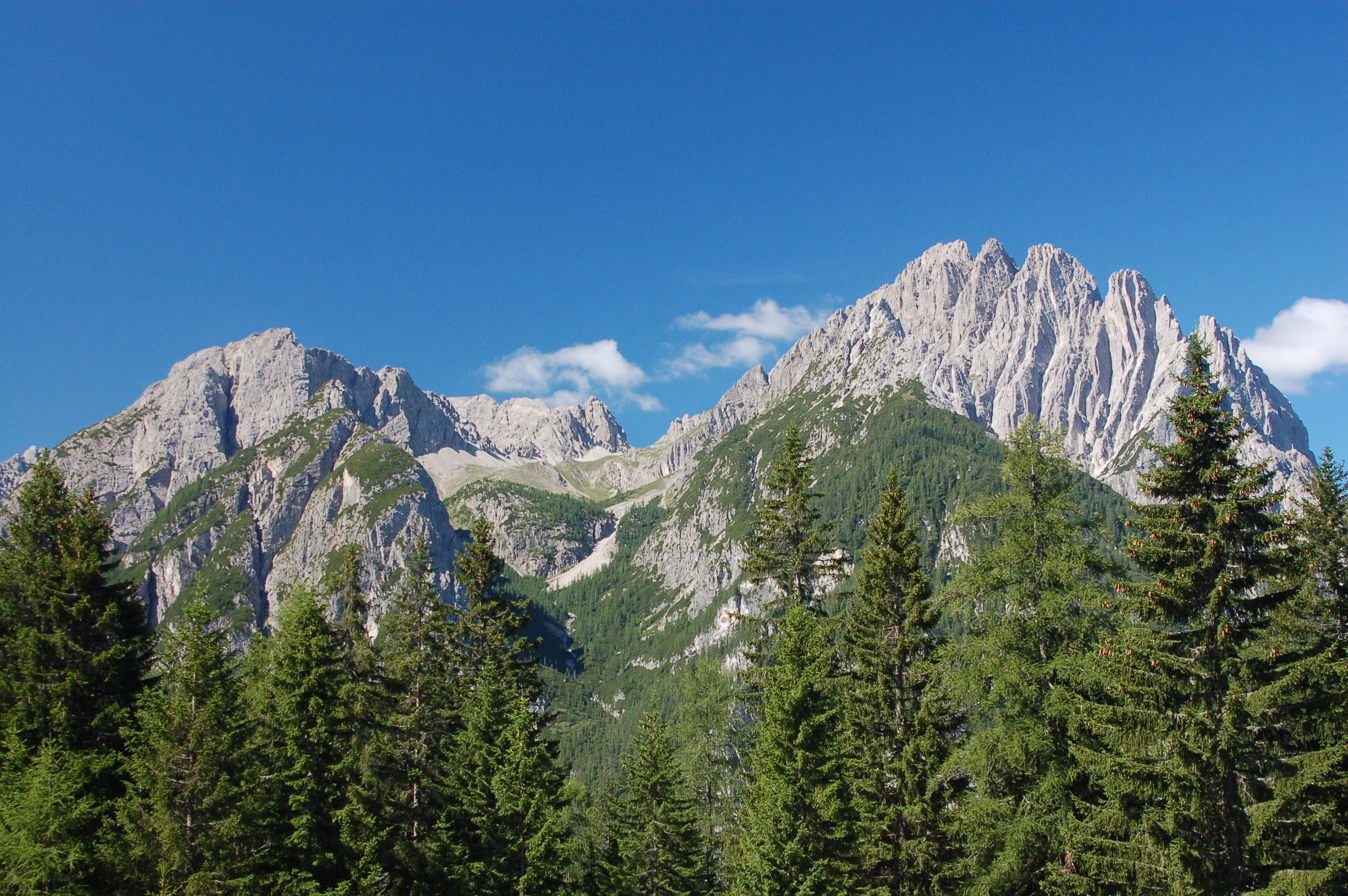
- Spitzkofel on the right

Highest point
- Elevation: 2,717 m (8,914 ft)
- Prominence: 457 m (1,499 ft)
- Coordinates: 46°45′N 12°39′E

Geography
- Location within Alps
- Location: East Tyrol, Austria
- Parent range: Lienz Dolomites

Spitzkofel (2,717 m) is a mountain of the Lienz Dolomites in East Tyrol, Austria.

The local mountain for the village of Leisach in the Lienz District, Spitzkofel is the most rugged peak of the Lienz Dolomites. It was probably first claimed in 1798 and is still a popular hiking peak, with excellent views from its summit towards the main town of Lienz, across the Lienz Dolomites, Austria's highest peak Großglockner, Großvenediger and the Carnic Alps.
