= Geography of Chicago =

Geography of the city of Chicago

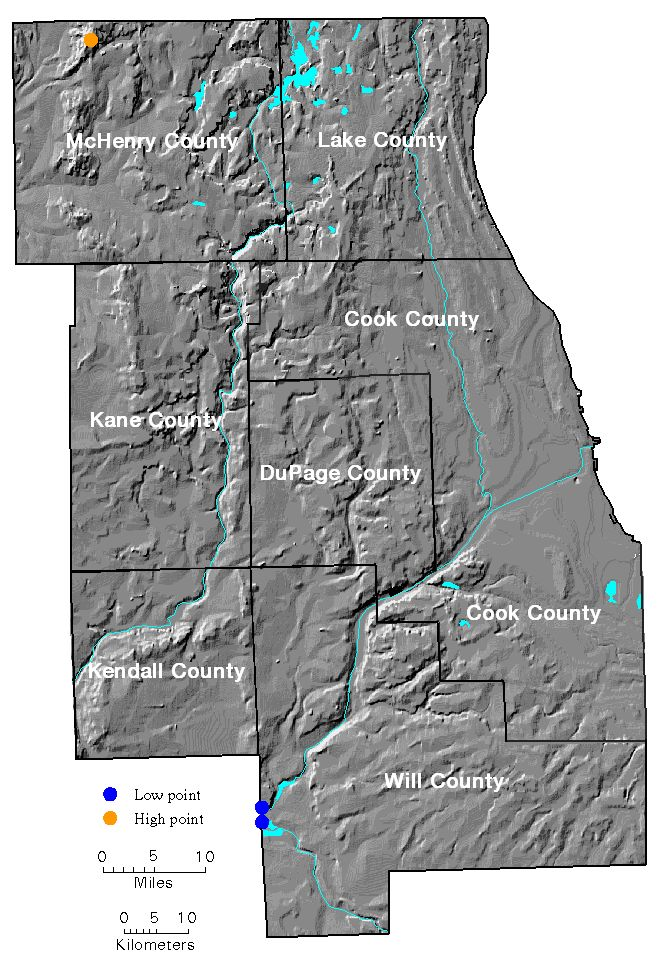
Geography of Chicago and surrounding counties.

Satellite image of Chicago, October, 2018

The city of Chicago is located in northern Illinois, United States, at the south western tip of Lake Michigan. It sits on the Saint Lawrence Seaway continental divide at the site of the Chicago Portage, an ancient trade route connecting the Mississippi River and the Great Lakes watersheds.

== Geography ==
Chicago's present natural geography is a result of the large glaciers of the Ice Age, namely the Wisconsinan Glaciation that carved out the modern basin of Lake Michigan (which formed from the glacier's meltwater). The city of Chicago itself sits on the Chicago Plain, a flat plain that was once the bottom of ancestral Lake Chicago. This plain has very little topographical relief; in fact, topographical relief is so unusual in the plain that what would be unnoticed hills and ridges in other locales have been given names. The highest natural point within the city limits is in the Beverly neighborhood at 41°42′12.5″N 87°40′37″W at 672 ft (205 m). In pioneer days, this hill was called Blue Island, so named because at a distance it looked like an island set in a trackless prairie sea. In fact, it and the nearby Stony Island were both islands in Lake Chicago as it receded. On the North side, the diagonals Clark Street and Ridge Boulevard run along ridges that were once sandbars in the Lake.

One special feature of the Chicago area was the now-vanished Mud Lake in the Des Plaines River watershed. During heavy periods of rain or when the Des Plaines overflowed its banks due to downstream ice dams in the early spring, the river would flow through Mud Lake to the South Branch of the Chicago River, forming a favorite portage for early traders and creating the path of the future I&M and Chicago Sanitary and Ship Canals. When the city we know today was initially founded in the 1830s, the land was swampy and most of the early building began on low dunes around the Chicago River's mouth. Indeed, Chicago's low lying geography, which ultimately became crucial to its boom town development (as the site of the Chicago Portage and canal), could not initially attract substantial early settlement because the tall grass prairie around its lake and river systems was underlain by hard packed glacial clay, making much of the area forbidding wetlands. Thus, the paradox of Chicago's development as a city in the 19th century became taking advantage of this geography, but also overcoming its limitations.

North of the city of Chicago, there are steep bluffs and ravines that run along Lake Michigan. In contrast, south of the city of Chicago into Northwest Indiana it is without bluffs, but instead has sand dunes. The greatest example of these can be seen at Indiana Dunes National Park, where some dunes reach up to almost 200 feet. Farther inland, a series of moraines surrounds the Chicago Plain. This surrounding area is hilly and higher than the Chicago Plain. Past the moraines, the land flattens out again, but is interspersed with a few deep river valleys such as the Illinois River, Fox River, Des Plaines River, and Kankakee River. Here you may find rock cliffs and rock ravines, which are absent from the interior Chicago area (the ravines of the north shore and south suburbs are soil ravines without any rock).

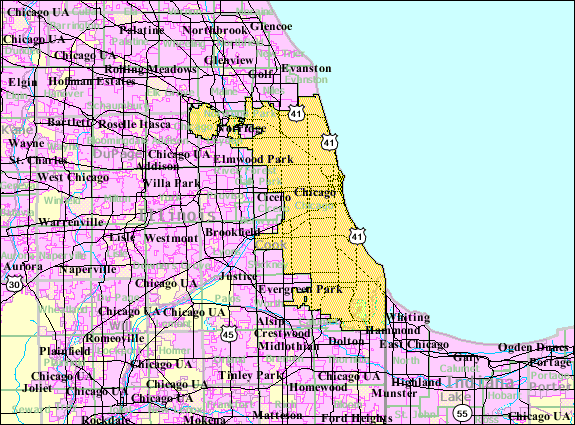
City limits of Chicago.

=== Chicago bedrock ===
During the Silurian geological age, the area now known as Chicago was submersed under a warm saltwater sea. Limestone eventually formed from the decay and buildup of shellfish and other calcium-rich sea creatures. In the Chicago area, the limestone underwent a further transformation into dolostone. Dolostone is the bedrock beneath Chicago's dense layer of clay and glacial debris.

The world's second largest aggregate quarry, Thornton Quarry, exists just south of the city limits in the suburb of Thornton. The dolostone bedrock rises close to the ground surface in this area, and hence this area has had active quarries since the 1840s.

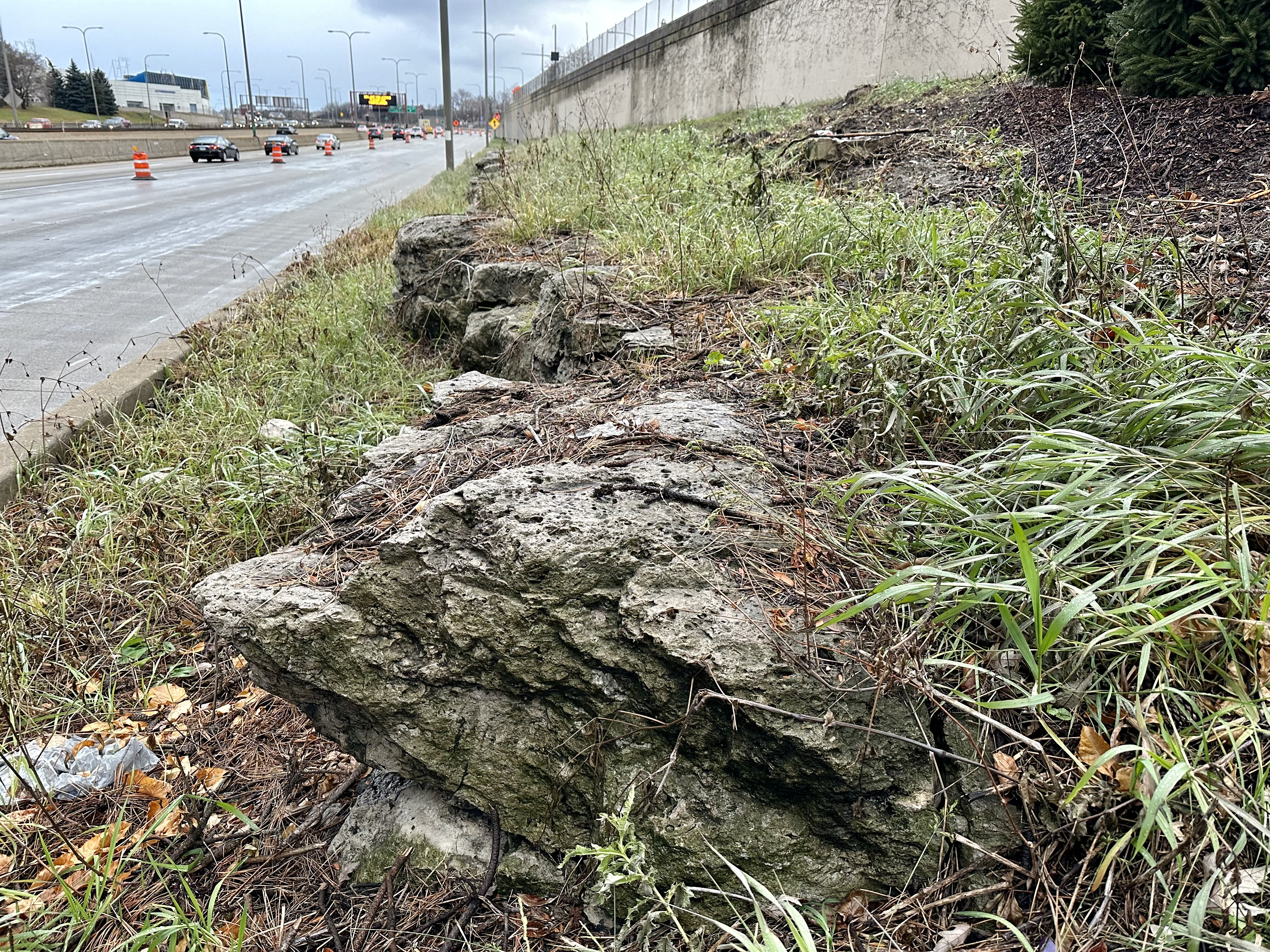
Silurian dolostone bedrock exposed at ground level near the side of the Kennedy Expressway

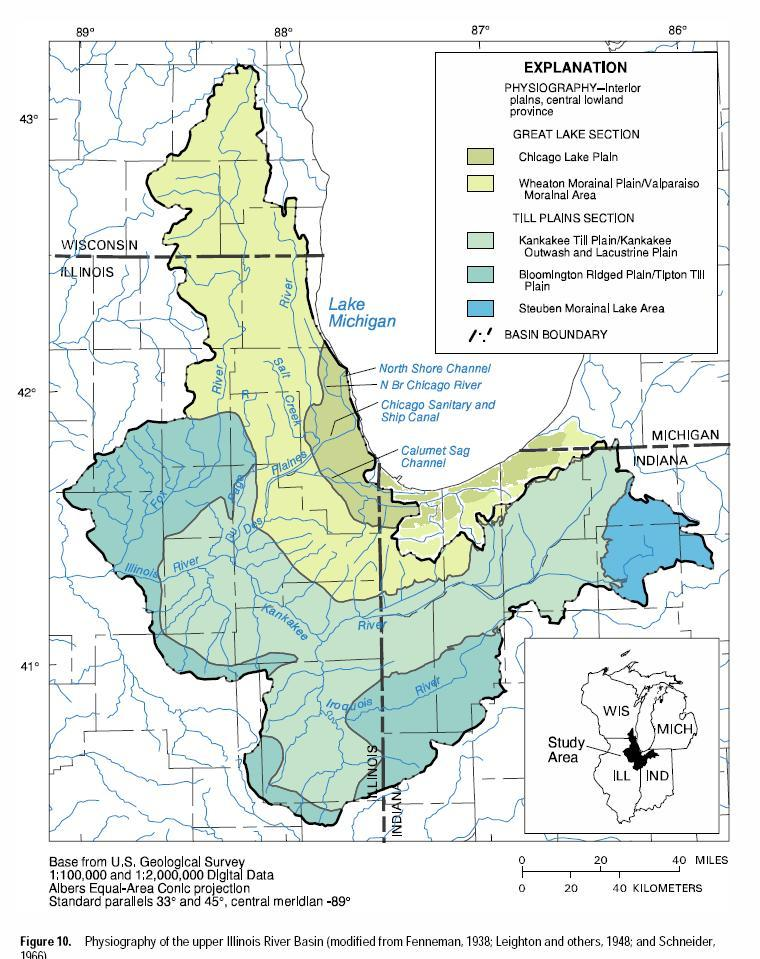
Physiography of the Chicago area, including the Valparaiso Moraine and the Kankakee Outwash Plain.

This layer of ancient Silurian dolomite is usually hundreds of feet below the ground surface throughout much of the Chicago area. Exceptions include near the Stearns Quarry in the Bridgeport neighborhood, the quarry (now landfill) in Hillside, the lower Des Plaines River and the Calumet-Sag Valleys. The Silurian dolostone bedrock is also exposed at the ground surface when the Kennedy Expressway dips below the UP Northwest Line near Addison Street.

=== Climate ===
The city lies within the humid continental climate zone, and experiences four distinct seasons. Summers are warm and humid with a July average of 75.5 °F (24.2 °C). Winters are cold, snowy and windy with temperatures below freezing. Spring and fall are mild with moderate humidity. According to the National Weather Service, Chicago's highest official temperature reading of 107 °F (42 °C) was recorded on June 1, 1934. The lowest temperature of −27 °F (−33 °C) was recorded on January 20, 1985. Along with long, hot dry spells in the summer, Chicago can suffer extreme winter cold spells. In the entire month of January 1977, the temperature did not rise above 31 °F (−0.6 °C). The average temperature that month was around 10 °F (−12 °C).

Chicago's yearly precipitation averages about 39 inches (990 millimeters). Summer is typically the rainiest season, with short-lived rainfall and thunderstorms more common than prolonged rainy periods. Winter precipitation tends to be more snow than rain. Chicago's snowiest winter on record was that of 1978–79, with 89.7 inches (227.8 cm) of snow in total. The winter of 2007–08, with more than 61 inches (155 cm) of snow, was the snowiest in nearly three decades, and the winter of 2008/2009 produced just over 50 inches (127 cm). This marked the first time in three decades that back-to-back winters produced 50 inches or more of snow. Average winter snowfall is normally, depending on the reporting location, 43.1 inches (109.5 cm). The highest one-day snowfall total in Chicago history was 18.6 inches (47.2 cm) on January 2, 1999. Chicago's highest one-day rainfall total was 6.63 inches (168.4 mm) on September 13, 2008. The previous record of 6.49 inches (164.8 mm) had been set on August 14, 1987. The record for yearly rainfall is 50.86 inches (1,292 mm) set in 2008; 1983 was the wettest year before with 49.35 inches (1,253 mm).

Climate data for Chicago (Midway International Airport), 1991–2020 normals, (Note: Mean monthly maxima and minima (i.e. the expected highest and lowest temperature readings at any point during the year or given month) calculated based on data at said location from 1991 to 2020.) extremes 1928–present
Month	Jan	Feb	Mar	Apr	May	Jun	Jul	Aug	Sep	Oct	Nov	Dec	Year
Record high °F (°C)	67 (19)	75 (24)	86 (30)	92 (33)	102 (39)	107 (42)	109 (43)	104 (40)	102 (39)	94 (34)	81 (27)	72 (22)	109 (43)
Mean maximum °F (°C)	53.4 (11.9)	57.9 (14.4)	72.0 (22.2)	81.5 (27.5)	89.2 (31.8)	93.9 (34.4)	96.0 (35.6)	94.2 (34.6)	90.8 (32.7)	82.8 (28.2)	68.0 (20.0)	57.5 (14.2)	97.1 (36.2)
Mean daily maximum °F (°C)	32.8 (0.4)	36.8 (2.7)	47.9 (8.8)	60.0 (15.6)	71.5 (21.9)	81.2 (27.3)	85.2 (29.6)	83.1 (28.4)	76.5 (24.7)	63.7 (17.6)	49.6 (9.8)	37.7 (3.2)	60.5 (15.8)
Daily mean °F (°C)	26.2 (−3.2)	29.9 (−1.2)	39.9 (4.4)	50.9 (10.5)	61.9 (16.6)	71.9 (22.2)	76.7 (24.8)	75.0 (23.9)	67.8 (19.9)	55.3 (12.9)	42.4 (5.8)	31.5 (−0.3)	52.4 (11.3)
Mean daily minimum °F (°C)	19.5 (−6.9)	22.9 (−5.1)	32.0 (0.0)	41.7 (5.4)	52.4 (11.3)	62.7 (17.1)	68.1 (20.1)	66.9 (19.4)	59.2 (15.1)	46.8 (8.2)	35.2 (1.8)	25.3 (−3.7)	44.4 (6.9)
Mean minimum °F (°C)	−3 (−19)	3.4 (−15.9)	14.1 (−9.9)	28.2 (−2.1)	39.1 (3.9)	49.3 (9.6)	58.6 (14.8)	57.6 (14.2)	45.0 (7.2)	31.8 (−0.1)	19.7 (−6.8)	5.3 (−14.8)	−6.5 (−21.4)
Record low °F (°C)	−25 (−32)	−20 (−29)	−7 (−22)	10 (−12)	28 (−2)	35 (2)	46 (8)	43 (6)	29 (−2)	20 (−7)	−3 (−19)	−20 (−29)	−25 (−32)
Average precipitation inches (mm)	2.30 (58)	2.12 (54)	2.66 (68)	4.15 (105)	4.75 (121)	4.53 (115)	4.02 (102)	4.10 (104)	3.33 (85)	3.86 (98)	2.73 (69)	2.33 (59)	40.88 (1,038)
Average snowfall inches (cm)	12.5 (32)	10.1 (26)	5.7 (14)	1.0 (2.5)	0.0 (0.0)	0.0 (0.0)	0.0 (0.0)	0.0 (0.0)	0.0 (0.0)	0.1 (0.25)	1.5 (3.8)	7.9 (20)	38.8 (99)
Average precipitation days (≥ 0.01 in)	11.5	9.4	11.1	12.0	12.4	11.1	10.0	9.3	8.4	10.8	10.2	10.8	127.0
Average snowy days (≥ 0.1 in)	8.9	6.4	3.9	0.9	0.0	0.0	0.0	0.0	0.0	0.2	1.6	6.3	28.2
Average ultraviolet index	1	2	4	6	7	9	9	8	6	4	2	1	5
Source 1: NOAA, WRCC
Source 2: Weather Atlas (UV)

Climate data for Chicago (O'Hare Int'l Airport), 1991–2020 normals, extremes 1871–present (Note: Official records for Chicago were kept at various locations in downtown from January 1871 to December 31, 1925, University of Chicago from January 1, 1926 to June 30, 1942, Midway Airport from July 1, 1942 to January 16, 1980, and at O'Hare Airport since January 17, 1980.)
Month	Jan	Feb	Mar	Apr	May	Jun	Jul	Aug	Sep	Oct	Nov	Dec	Year
Record high °F (°C)	67 (19)	75 (24)	88 (31)	91 (33)	98 (37)	104 (40)	105 (41)	102 (39)	101 (38)	94 (34)	81 (27)	71 (22)	105 (41)
Mean maximum °F (°C)	52.3 (11.3)	56.8 (13.8)	71.0 (21.7)	80.9 (27.2)	88.0 (31.1)	93.1 (33.9)	94.9 (34.9)	93.2 (34.0)	89.7 (32.1)	81.7 (27.6)	67.0 (19.4)	56.4 (13.6)	96.0 (35.6)
Mean daily maximum °F (°C)	31.6 (−0.2)	35.7 (2.1)	47.0 (8.3)	59.0 (15.0)	70.5 (21.4)	80.4 (26.9)	84.5 (29.2)	82.5 (28.1)	75.5 (24.2)	62.7 (17.1)	48.4 (9.1)	36.6 (2.6)	59.5 (15.3)
Daily mean °F (°C)	25.2 (−3.8)	28.8 (−1.8)	39.0 (3.9)	49.7 (9.8)	60.6 (15.9)	70.6 (21.4)	75.4 (24.1)	73.8 (23.2)	66.3 (19.1)	54.0 (12.2)	41.3 (5.2)	30.5 (−0.8)	51.3 (10.7)
Mean daily minimum °F (°C)	18.8 (−7.3)	21.8 (−5.7)	31.0 (−0.6)	40.3 (4.6)	50.6 (10.3)	60.8 (16.0)	66.4 (19.1)	65.1 (18.4)	57.1 (13.9)	45.4 (7.4)	34.1 (1.2)	24.4 (−4.2)	43.0 (6.1)
Mean minimum °F (°C)	−4.5 (−20.3)	0.5 (−17.5)	11.8 (−11.2)	25.6 (−3.6)	36.7 (2.6)	46.0 (7.8)	54.5 (12.5)	54.3 (12.4)	41.8 (5.4)	29.7 (−1.3)	17.3 (−8.2)	3.2 (−16.0)	−8.5 (−22.5)
Record low °F (°C)	−27 (−33)	−21 (−29)	−12 (−24)	7 (−14)	27 (−3)	35 (2)	45 (7)	42 (6)	29 (−2)	14 (−10)	−2 (−19)	−25 (−32)	−27 (−33)
Average precipitation inches (mm)	1.99 (51)	1.97 (50)	2.45 (62)	3.75 (95)	4.49 (114)	4.10 (104)	3.71 (94)	4.25 (108)	3.19 (81)	3.43 (87)	2.42 (61)	2.11 (54)	37.86 (962)
Average snowfall inches (cm)	11.3 (29)	10.7 (27)	5.5 (14)	1.3 (3.3)	0.0 (0.0)	0.0 (0.0)	0.0 (0.0)	0.0 (0.0)	0.0 (0.0)	0.2 (0.51)	1.8 (4.6)	7.6 (19)	38.4 (98)
Average extreme snow depth inches (cm)	6.3 (16)	6.3 (16)	4.0 (10)	0.6 (1.5)	0.0 (0.0)	0.0 (0.0)	0.0 (0.0)	0.0 (0.0)	0.0 (0.0)	0.0 (0.0)	1.5 (3.8)	3.9 (9.9)	9.8 (25)
Average precipitation days (≥ 0.01 in)	11.0	9.4	10.8	12.3	12.5	11.1	9.7	9.4	8.5	10.5	10.0	10.6	125.8
Average snowy days (≥ 0.1 in)	8.5	6.4	4.0	1.0	0.0	0.0	0.0	0.0	0.0	0.2	1.6	6.1	27.8
Average relative humidity (%)	72.2	71.6	69.7	64.9	64.1	65.6	68.5	70.7	71.1	68.6	72.5	75.5	69.6
Average dew point °F (°C)	13.6 (−10.2)	17.6 (−8.0)	27.1 (−2.7)	35.8 (2.1)	45.7 (7.6)	55.8 (13.2)	61.7 (16.5)	61.0 (16.1)	53.8 (12.1)	41.7 (5.4)	31.6 (−0.2)	20.1 (−6.6)	38.8 (3.8)
Mean monthly sunshine hours	135.8	136.2	187.0	215.3	281.9	311.4	318.4	283.0	226.6	193.2	113.3	106.3	2,508.4
Percentage possible sunshine	46	46	51	54	62	68	69	66	60	56	38	37	56
Source: NOAA (relative humidity, dew point and sun 1961–1990)

== Statistics ==
According to the United States Census Bureau, the City of Chicago has a total area of 606.1 km^{2} (234.0 sq mi). 588.3 km^{2} (227.1 sq mi) of it is land and 17.8 square kilometres (6.9 sq mi) of it is water. The total area is 2.94% water. The city has been built on relatively flat land, the average height of land is 579 feet (176 m) above sea level. The centroid (geographical center) of the city is at 41.840675°N 87.679365°W, southeast of 28th and Leavitt Streets in an industrial area near the Chicago Sanitary and Ship Canal. (Before annexations in the 1950s, notably for O'Hare International Airport, references placed the geographical center near 37th and Honore Streets.) Chicago, along with New York City and Los Angeles, California are the three most populous cities of the U.S., yet Chicago is only half the other two cities' individual land areas. Chicago's nickname, "The Windy City," actually acquired from a political op-ed piece, fits the city well as its location on Lake Michigan moderates the climate and often provides a breeze.

The Chicago Metropolitan Statistical Area (MSA) consists of Cook county and five surrounding Illinois counties as well as the Chicago–Gary–Kenosha Combined Statistical Area (CSA) which is made up of nine counties, two of them in northwestern Indiana and one in southeastern Wisconsin.

The Chicago skyline.

== Cityscape ==
After building the first ever skyscraper (Home Insurance Building), Chicago has been at the forefront of skyscraper building ever since. Today Chicago can boast to having 2 of the 10 tallest buildings in the United States and 9 of the 100 in the world.

By modern standards, Chicago has little reason to build up: being located in the Midwest, it has plenty of room to sprawl outwards on almost Euclideanesque flat ground. There is the Chicago River, which may bring some argument as to geographic restriction, but the impact of which was strongly lessened by the strict adherence to the Chicago grid across the river.

Today, Chicago is going through a massive skyscraper building boom, with projects like 55 East Erie (the tallest residential building in the U.S. outside New York City) and Trump International Hotel (completed in August 2008, it is the second tallest in Chicago and the tallest building built in the U.S. for nearly three decades) breaking ground frequently. This can be attributed to the precedent that Chicago has always had a history of frantic skyscraper building, mostly beginning after the Great Chicago Fire when the price of land in the city increased dramatically. This caused architects to start building upward. Since this time developers simply follow the pattern set before them.

== Ecology ==
Chicago lies between the Temperate deciduous forest and Temperate grassland zone (specifically Central forest–grasslands transition, which traditionally feature tall grass prairie). Trees native to the area, which are all deciduous, include:

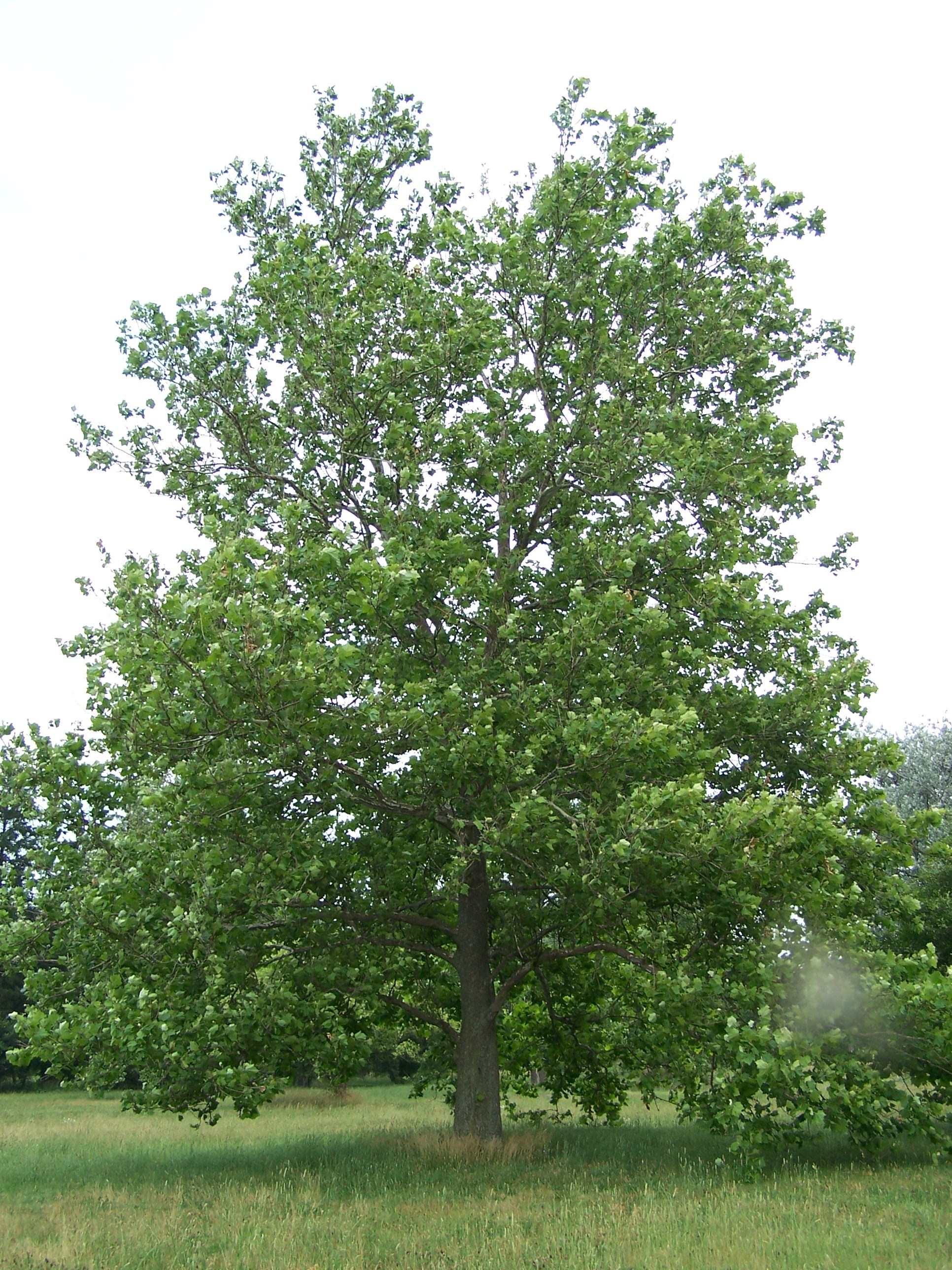
American Sycamore at Morton Arboretum, Lisle, Illinois.

- Acer negundo
- Acer rubrum
- Acer saccharinum
- Betula papyrifera
- Celtis occidentalis
- Fagus grandifolia
- Fraxinus pennsylvanica
- Juglans nigra
- Ostrya virginiana
- Quercus imbricaria
- Platanus occidentalis
- Populus tremuloides
- Sassafras albidum
- Tilia americana
- Ulmus americana
- Viburnum lentago

== See also ==
- Chicago River
- Chicago Sanitary and Ship Canal
- I&M Canal
- Lake Michigan
