= Chicago Portage =

Historic waterway in the United States

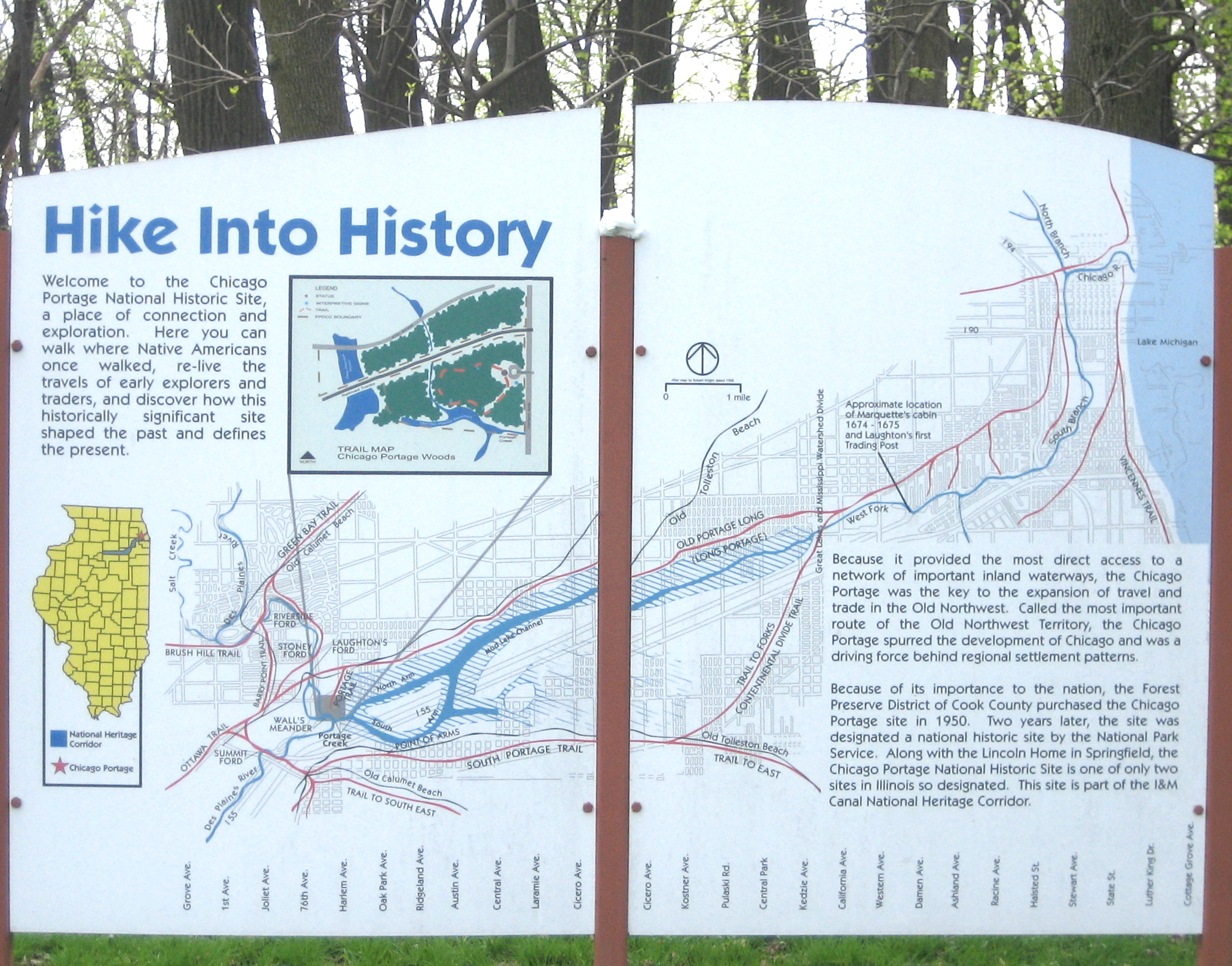
- Interactive map of Chicago Portage
- Elevation: 589 ft (180 m)
- Traversed by: Mud Lake (historic), Illinois and Michigan Canal (historic), Chicago Sanitary and Ship Canal, several railroads, numerous roads including I-55 (Stevenson Expressway)

Location
- Location: (historic dividing point) 3100 West 31st Street, Chicago, Cook County, Illinois, US
- Range: Valparaiso Moraine
- Coordinates: 41°50′14″N 87°42′8″W

The Chicago Portage was an ancient portage that connected the Great Lakes waterway system with the Mississippi River system. This connection provided comparatively easy access from the mouth of the St. Lawrence River on the Atlantic Ocean to the Rocky Mountains and the Gulf of Mexico. The approximately six-mile link had been used by Native Americans for thousands of years during the Pre-Columbian era for travel and trade.

During the summer of 1673 members of the Kaskaskia, a tribe of the Illinois Confederation, guided French explorers Louis Jolliet and Jacques Marquette—the first known Europeans to explore this part of North America—to the portage. A strategic location, it became important to European exploration in central North America, resulting ultimately in the founding of Chicago.

The portage crossed waterways and wetlands between the Chicago River and the Des Plaines River, through a gap in the Valparaiso Moraine. In 1848, the water divide was breached by the construction of the Illinois and Michigan (I&M) Canal through the portage; this was deepened and widened in 1900 by the Chicago Sanitary and Ship Canal which was also used to reverse the water's directional flow.

== Origin ==
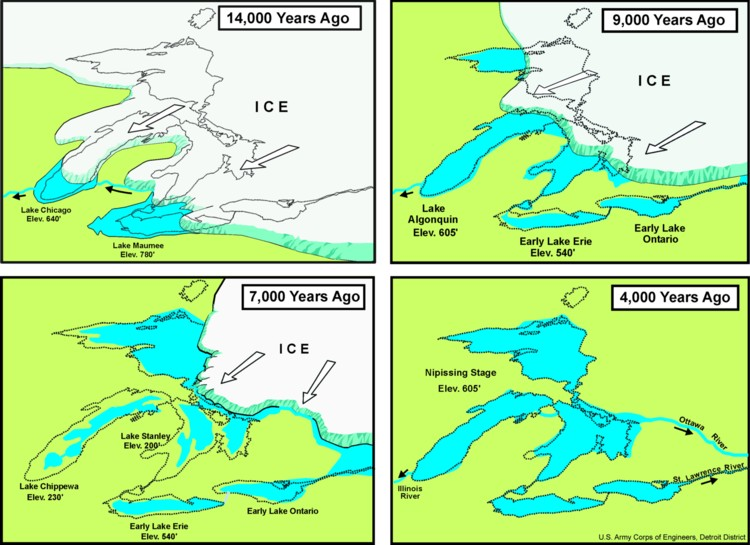
Development of the Great Lakes.

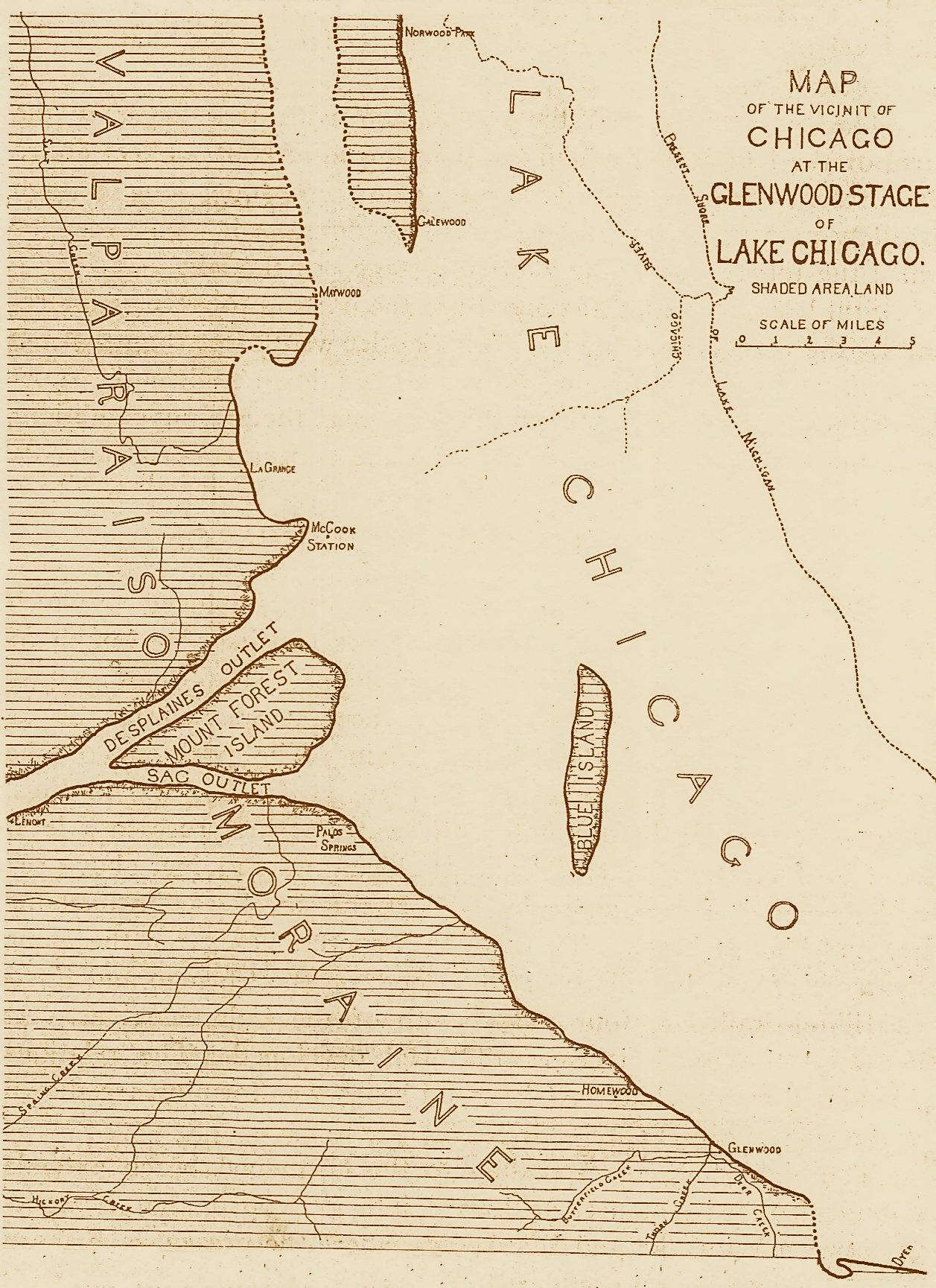
Map of part of ancient Lake Chicago in what became the portage region, when the Outlet River cut through the glacial moraines to drain the lake, creating the later pathway and topography of the portage.

The history of the Chicago Portage begins at the end of the Last Ice Age. It was formed as the Wisconsin glaciation retreated northward, beginning about 14,000 years ago, leaving behind Lake Chicago (the ancestor of Lake Michigan), which was created from the glacier's meltwater.

As the glacier melted and retreated, the water in Lake Chicago rose until it overflowed the southwestern edge of the Valparaiso Moraine, which surrounds the lake's southern half, creating the Chicago Outlet River. This was a substantial river, comparable to the present Niagara River, and over time it carved the channel used by the main and south branches of the Chicago River, the Des Plaines River, and the terrain that became the Chicago Portage.

As the glacier continued to retreat, it opened another outlet far to the east that became the St. Lawrence River. This allowed the lakes to drain faster in that direction, and the Chicago Outlet River dried up, leaving a gap in the moraine that served the Chicago Portage.

The Chicago Portage linked the Chicago River's South Branch and the Des Plaines River. The point at which the portage crossed the low water divide that separated waters flowing east toward Lake Michigan from waters flowing west toward the Mississippi River was a wetland that occupied the former stream bed of the Chicago Outlet River. Early settlers called this marshy area "Mud Lake". The total length of the portage was about six miles.

Mud Lake could be wet, dry, marshy, or frozen, depending on the season and the weather, making it at times a difficult albeit very valuable transportation route. During very wet weather the water level in both the Des Plaines River and the Chicago River would rise to the point that Mud Lake was flooded, and travelers could traverse the entire six miles by canoe. During dry weather, particularly in late summer, the water level would be much lower, and it was necessary to pull out canoes at some point and carry them and all supplies through the area of Mud Lake.

== Transportational importance ==
The Chicago Portage allowed easy access by boat to almost all of North America from the mouth of the St. Lawrence River to the Rocky Mountains and the Gulf of Mexico.

=== St. Lawrence River divide ===
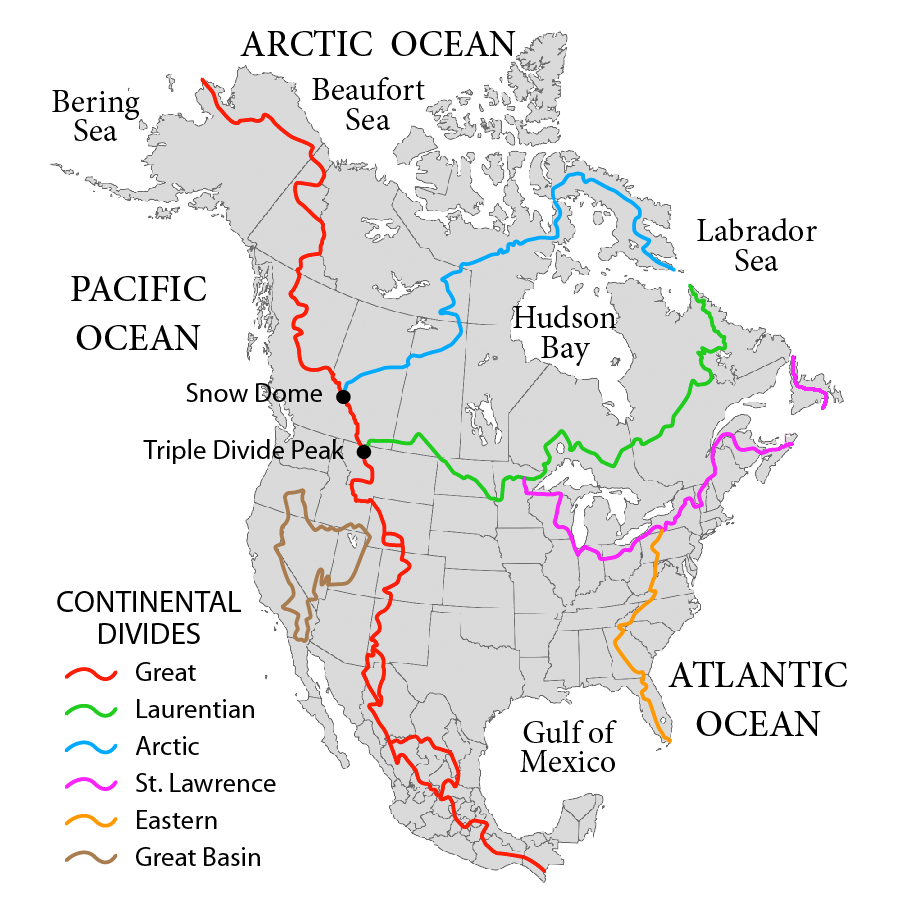
Continental Divides of North America. The pink line (center-right) denotes the Great Lakes-St Lawrence divide that runs through Chicago.

Until the second half of the 19th century water transportation was virtually the only practical way to move goods and people around North America. Hence, connections between strategic waterways, usually involving portages, had special importance.

The channel cut by the Chicago Outlet River created an easy passage over the St. Lawrence River Divide, the continental divide that separated the Great Lakes waterway system from the Mississippi River waterway system and, as the illustration shows, permitting access between the north and almost all of what was to become the United States from the Allegheny Mountains to the Rocky Mountains as far south as the Gulf of Mexico.

=== Early peoples ===
Native Americans had used the portage for almost 2,000 years before the arrival of Europeans as a transportation route between the Great Lakes region and the Mississippi River in the interior. The portage was probably first used around 500 BCE^{, chap 2} near the end of the Archaic period. Early people had been migrating into the region since the Paleo-Indian period, and by this time, these people had begun to create semi-permanent settlements. Archaeological evidence shows that long-distance trade routes had been established. Late Archaic sites that have been uncovered around the Chicago area have revealed shells from the Gulf Coast, galena from the area of Galena, Illinois, and copper from the vicinity of Lake Superior.

The Woodland period (500 BCE – 1000 CE) succeeded the Archaic. The Hopewell culture (200 BCE to 500 CE) that developed during this time extended these trade networks further and began using pottery. Hopewell tribes engaged in extensive trade. This trade network is now termed the Hopewell exchange, the part that encompassed Illinois being known as the Havana Hopewell. Since at this time most long-distance travel for trade purposes was via water, it is likely that during this period the Chicago Portage was first used regularly.

The Mississippian period (1000–1600) succeeded the Woodland. During this time native people built more permanent settlements and continued to expand trading networks. Cahokia was the largest of these settlements and the best example of how native society was evolving. It was located in an area where the Mississippi River, the Missouri River, and the Illinois River joined and was therefore important to the trade network that had developed. Given that copper from the northern shores of Lake Superior has been found at archeological digs at Cahokia and that Mississippian pottery has been found at sites at northern Lake Huron, it is likely that the Chicago Portage was used regularly during this period.^{, p 24}

=== First Europeans ===
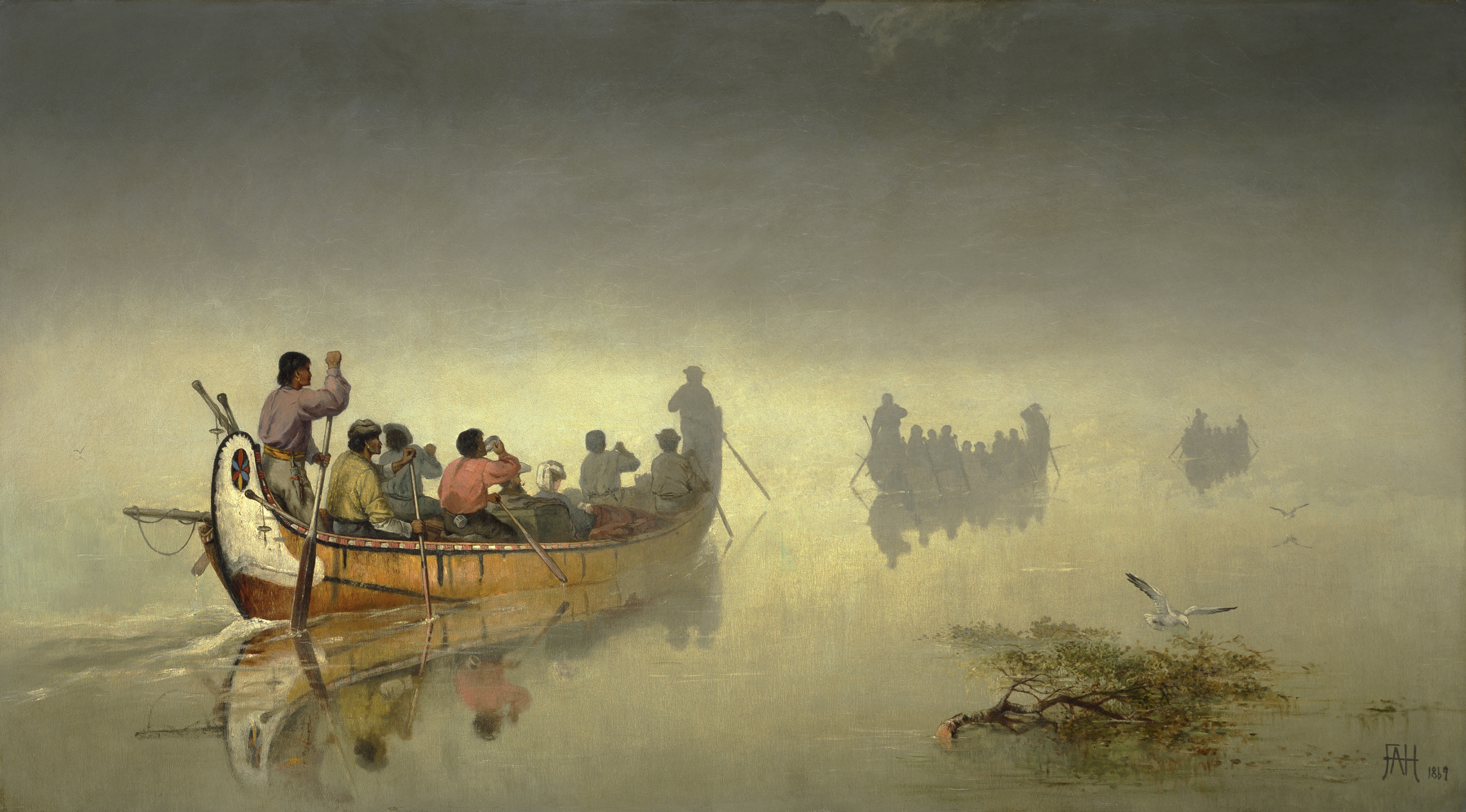
Canoes in a fog, Lake Superior by Francis Anne Hopkins.

By 1673 the French had established a trading post at present day Mackinac Island near the north end of Lake Michigan. Jean Talon, the first intendant (administrator) of New France, having heard of reports of a great river to the west and hoping it would be the long-sought "Northwest Passage" to the Pacific Ocean, ordered a reconnaissance mission to find and explore this river. In May 1673 Louis Jolliet, Jacques Marquette, and five voyageurs began their voyage of discovery.

Accordingly, on The 17th day of may, 1673, we started from the Mission of st. Ignace at Michilimakinac where I Then was. The Joy that we felt at being selected for This Expedition animated our Courage, and rendered the labor of paddling from morning to night agreeable to us.

— Marquette

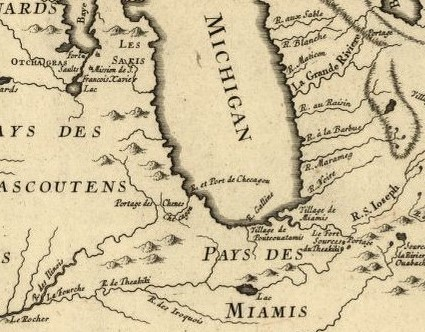
Detail from a French map (1755) showing the Chicago Portage.

The explorers entered the Mississippi River near what is now Wyalusing State Park, south of Prairie du Chien, Wisconsin. They explored the river and then returned to Michilimakinac by a different route on the advice of Native Americans they had encountered along the way, who told them that there was a better way to return to Lake Michigan. Travelling by stages up the Illinois River to the Des Plaines River, in September 1673 members of the Kaskaskia, a tribe of the Illinois Confederation, guided Jolliet and Marquette to the western end of the Chicago Portage.

During the 18th century, the Chicago Portage was one of the most strategic locations in the interior of the North American continent for the French. In particular, it provided an easy connection between the French cities of Montreal and New Orleans. An indication of the importance of portages that could potentially make this connection is shown in early maps of the region. For example, this French map of the western regions of New France, published 1755, shows the "R.(iviere) et Port de Checageu" (River and Port of Checageu), and the "Portage des Chenes" (the portage of oaks), the name the French originally gave to the portage.

=== Crossing the portage ===
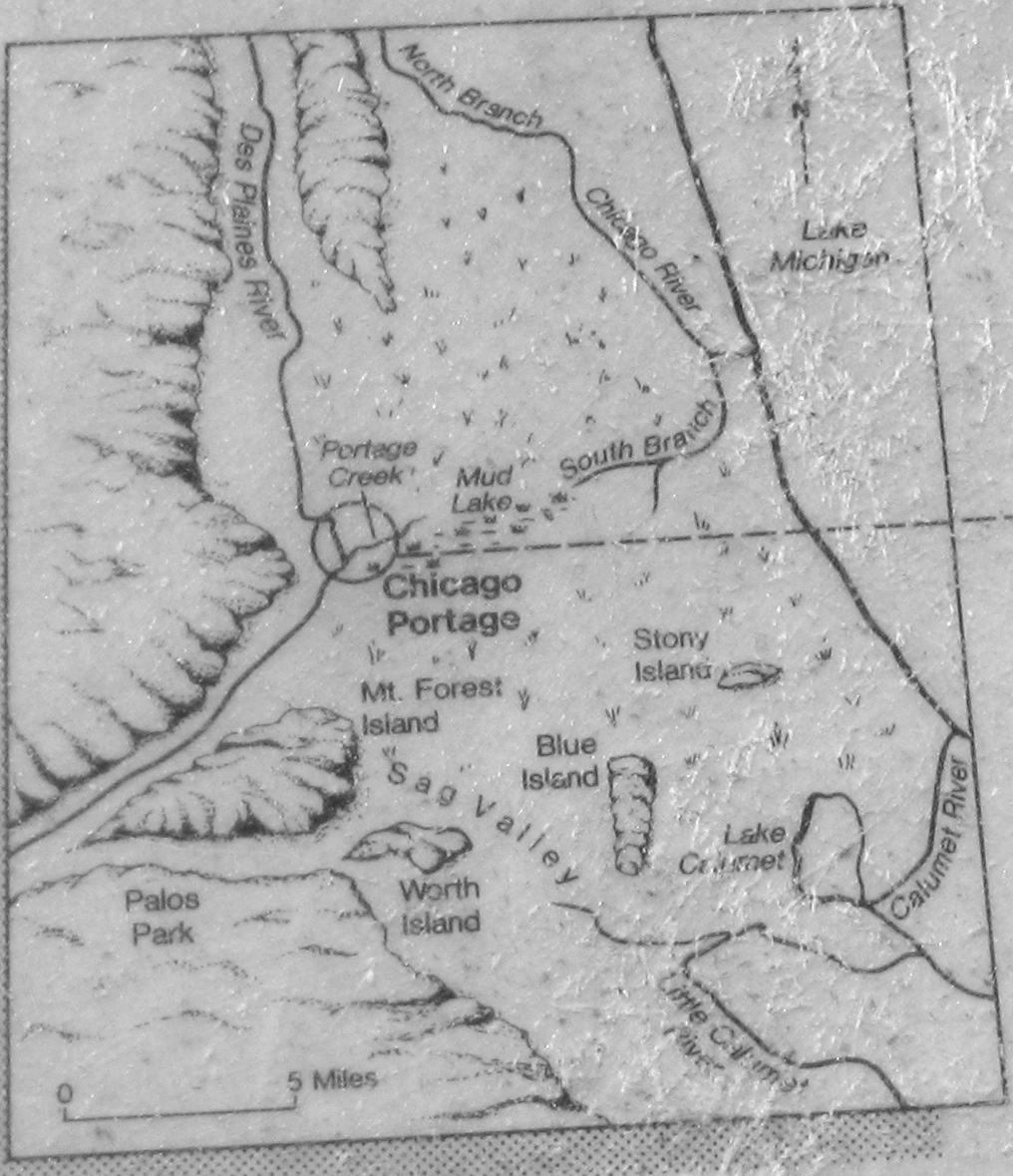
Map of Chicago Portage.

If water level in the portage was high enough to allow passage by canoe for most of the way, passage across the portage was relatively easy. Accounts from soldiers stationed at Fort Dearborn at the mouth of the Chicago River describe a passage from west to east. Starting at the west end of the portage at the Des Plaines River they paddled east through Portage Creek and through the marsh that would later be known as Mud Lake. At the east end of the marsh they portaged their boats, equipment, and supplies over a low rise of land that was the continental divide. They then entered the South Branch of the Chicago River and paddled north to the fort.

If water levels in the portage were low, passage was difficult because of the soft and waterlogged ground. In 1818 Gurdon Hubbard, traveling with a "brigade" of voyageurs as an indentured clerk, crossed the portage from east to west and left an account in his memoirs. They had traveled down to the portage from Mackinac Island in bateaux (heavy flat-bottomed boats). They traveled the South Branch of the Chicago River and pulled their boats into Mud Lake where the water was deep enough to float them. Then:

Four men only remained in a boat and pushed with these poles, while six or eight others waded in the mud alongside, and by united efforts constantly jerking it along, so that from early dawn to dark we succeeded only in passing a part of our boats through to the Aux Plaines [Des Plaines River] outlet, where we found the first hard ground.

Other members of the crew carried the boats' cargo across the seven-mile-long land trail to the Des Plaines River. Because of his status as clerk of the expedition, by virtue of his ability to read and write, Hubbard was spared this difficult work. He describes the hardships of crossing the portage in its natural state:

While a part of our crew were thus employed, others busied themselves in transporting our goods on their backs to the river; it was a laborious day for all. Those who waded through the mud frequently sank to their waist, and at times were forced to cling to the side of the boat to prevent going over their heads.

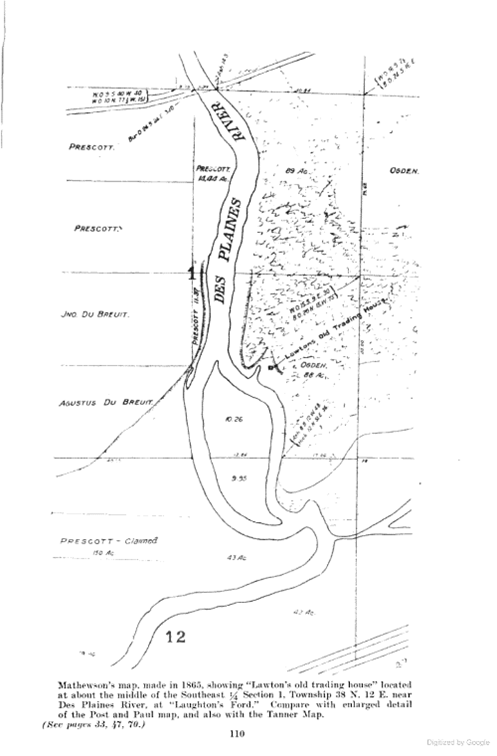
Chicago Portage From Knight and Zeuch Study^{, p 95}

After a day crossing the portage, the men camped near the river at the west end of the portage. But their discomfort was not yet over, as Hubbard's account continues.

... after reaching the end and camping for the night came the task of ridding themselves from the bloodsuckers [ leeches ]. ... The lake was full of these abominable black plagues, and they stuck so tight to the skin that they broke in pieces if force was used to remove them; experience had taught the use of a decoction of tobacco to remove them, and this was resorted to with good success. Having rid ourselves of the bloodsuckers, we were assailed by myriads of mosquitoes, that rendered sleep hopeless, though we sought the softest spots on the ground for our beds. Those who had waded the lake suffered great agony, their limbs becoming swollen and inflamed, and their sufferings were not ended for two or three days. It took us three consecutive days of such toil to pass all our boats through this miserable lake...

== Development ==
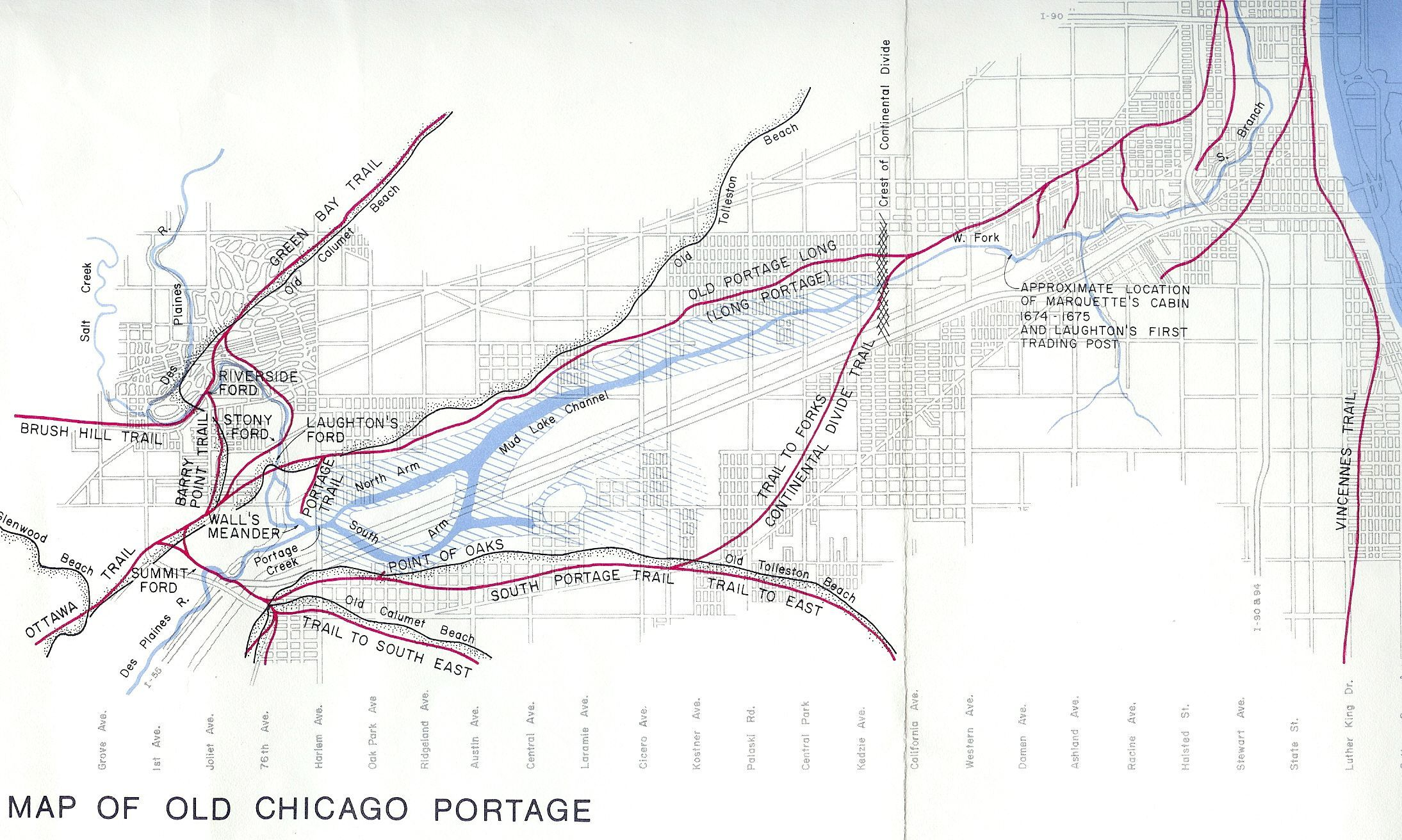
Map of the portage superimposed on an early map of Chicago. The Old Portage Long trail was used when there was insufficient water in Mud Lake to allow traverse by canoe. Since there was usually sufficient water in the larger Illinois River for canoeing, this "Ottawa Trail" was used in very dry conditions when there was insufficient water in the Des Plaines River.

=== Wagon roads and today's highways ===
As commerce over the portage increased, local entrepreneurs developed services to help travelers using the portage. One such were the wagon roads that made commerce over the portage much easier during dry periods. An example is the Ottawa trail that started as a pathway, became a wagon road, and ultimately was paved and became part of US Route 66.

=== Illinois and Michigan Canal ===
The earliest Europeans to cross the portage saw the potential for a canal dug along the route of the portage. Jolliet, after his first passage, opined that a canal across "... only a few leagues of prairie ..." could link the Great Lakes with the Mississippi Valley. Eventually, Jolliet's idea became reality in the form of the Illinois and Michigan (I&M) Canal which opened in 1848.

== Significance to Chicago ==
Recognizing the strategic importance of the Chicago Portage, in 1803 Fort Dearborn was constructed at the mouth of the Chicago River to guard it. In 1848 the opening of the I&M canal allowed water transportation from the mouth of St. Lawrence River through Chicago to the Mississippi River and the vast ranch and farm lands drained by it. The population of Chicago tripled during the next six years. The portage helped develop Chicago into the transportation hub of the Midwest and continue its role as the link between the East and the West.

Flag of Chicago

The flag of Chicago is a stylized map of the Chicago Portage, with four red stars symbolizing the city and its history, separating two blue stripes symbolizing the two great waterway systems connected by the portage and the canals that followed it.

== National historic site ==
The Chicago Portage National Historic Site is located in Lyons, Illinois. The site, designated January 3, 1952 as an "affiliated area" of the National Park Service, is owned and administered by the Forest Preserve District of Cook County.

Preserved within the park is the western end of the historic Chicago Portage. The site is the only part of the portage that remains in a natural and protected state more or less as it existed when in use by Native Americans and settlers.

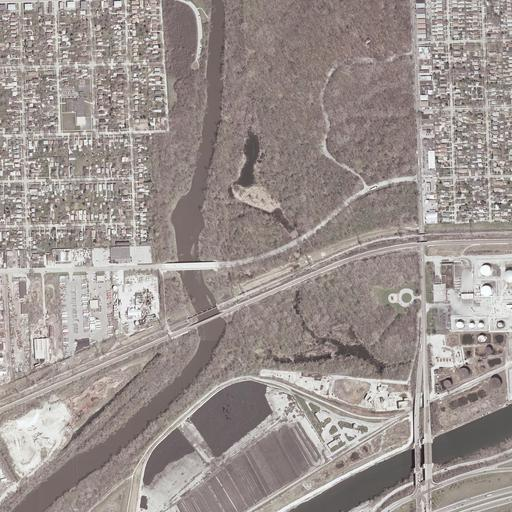
Des Plaines R. today

The present Des Plaines River is not the river as it was in 1673 when Jolliet and Marquette first passed through the Chicago Portage. During the period 1892-1900 the original channel of the river was straightened, cutting off the part that the Jolliet and Marquette party used to reach the west end of the portage. This aerial photo shows the Des Plaines River and the area around the Portage Historic Site as they exist today (the image is dated 2005 but historical features remain unchanged). The remnants of the old course of the river can be seen as faint collections of water in the middle of the image. The current course of the Des Plaines River flows north to south and is shown just to the left of these remnants.

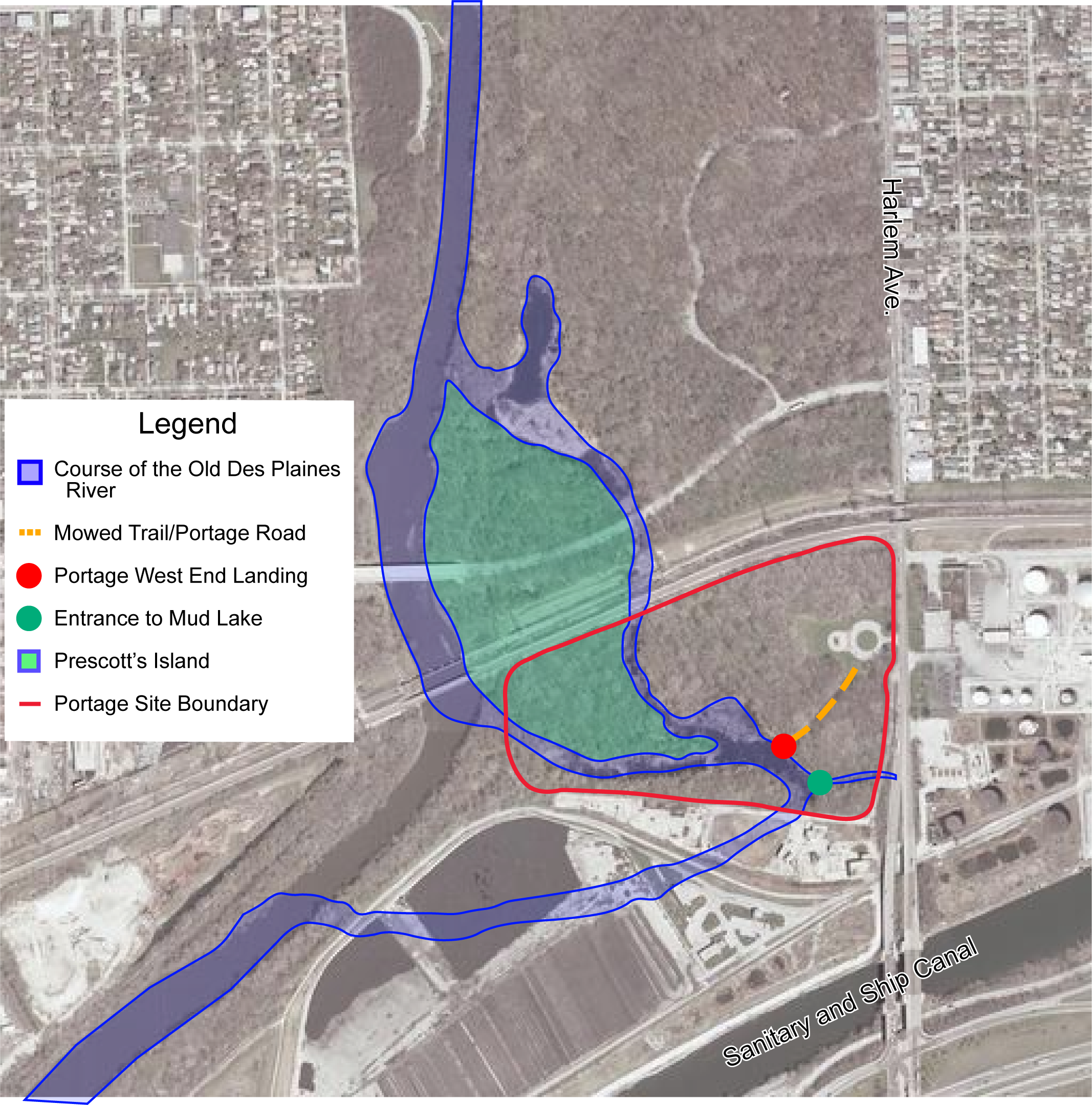
Des Plaines R. as it was

The second image shows the ancient course of the Des Plaines River overlaid (in blue) on the photo above it to show the river as it was during the centuries of the portage's use. Travelers coming from the West would approach from the southwest, using the old river outlined in blue. Reaching the bend in the river they would either travel east into Mud Lake, if there was sufficient water there to permit that option, or stop at the landing, offload their canoes or boats, and carry everything along the portage trails to reach the South Branch of the Chicago River. The Chicago Portage National Historic Site is outlined in red and the map shows the entrance to Mud Lake and the West End Landing.

== Gallery ==
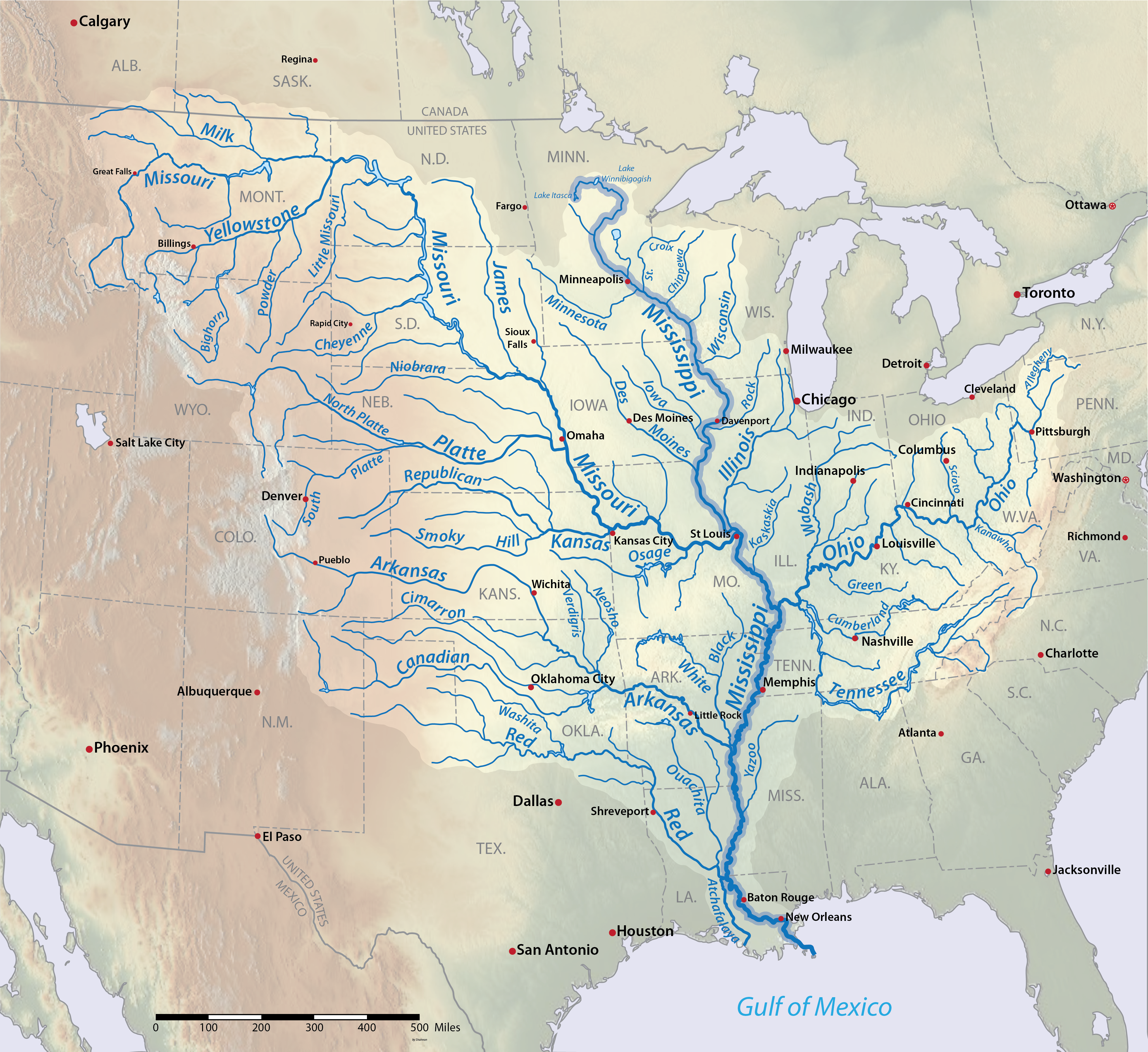
Mississippi Valley watershed and Chicago. The Great Lakes-St Lawrence basin is to the north-east (upper-right).

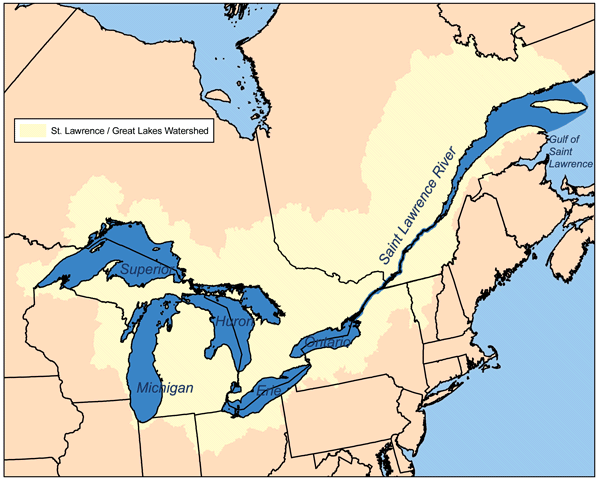
Great Lakes Basin and St. Lawrence watershed. The Chicago Portage to the Mississippi Valley is to the south west (lower-left) of Lake Michigan.

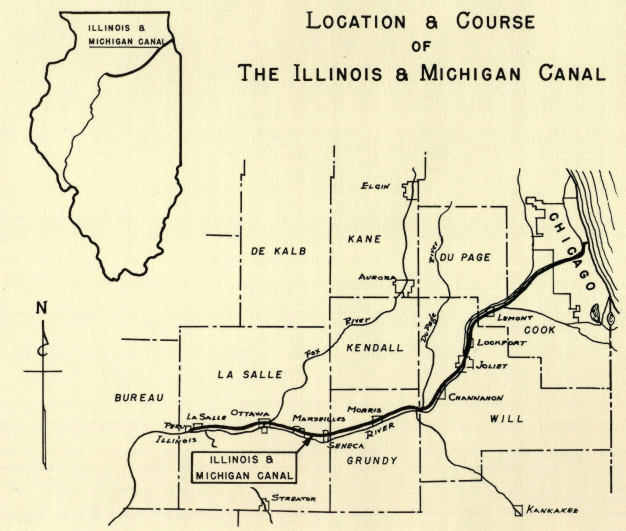
The Illinois and Michigan Canal breached the water divide in 1848. It was largely replaced by the Chicago Sanitary and Ship Canal in 1900.

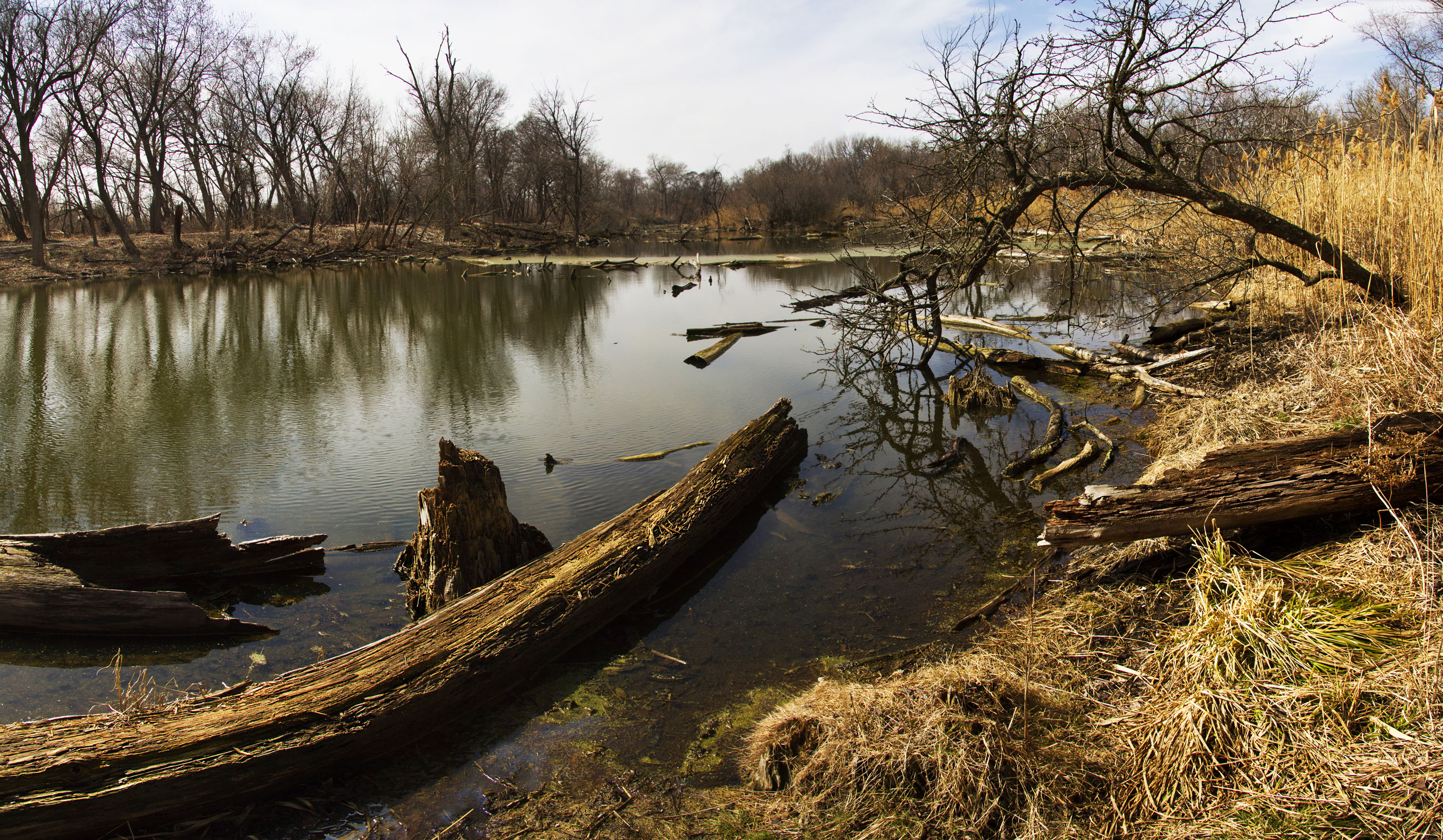
The waterway at the Chicago Portage National Historic Site in March.

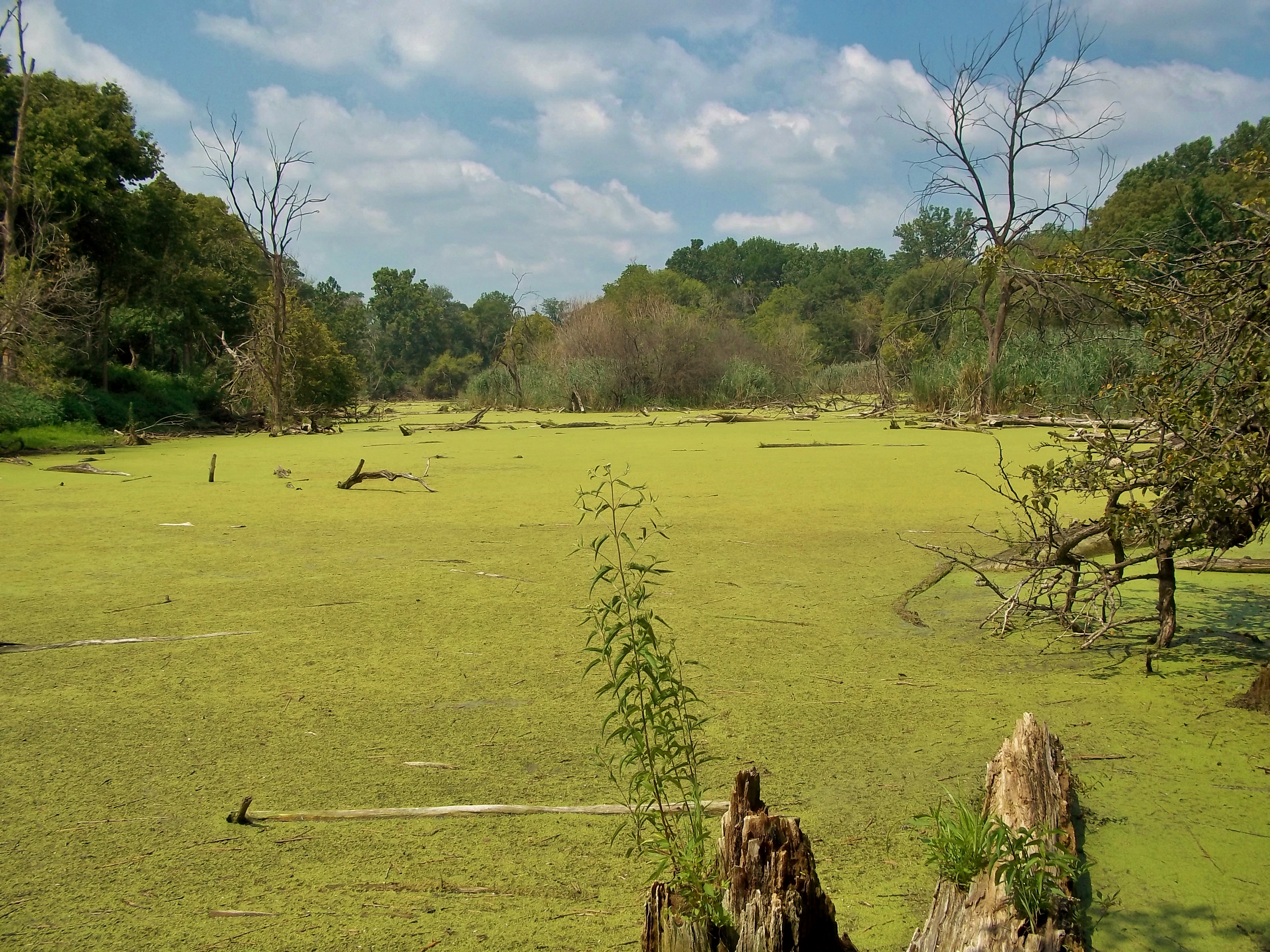
The waterway at the Chicago Portage National Historic Site in August.

== See also ==
- Geography of Chicago
- Laurentian Divide
- Eastern Continental Divide
- Stevenson Expressway
- Chicago Sanitary and Ship Canal
