= Hochstadel =

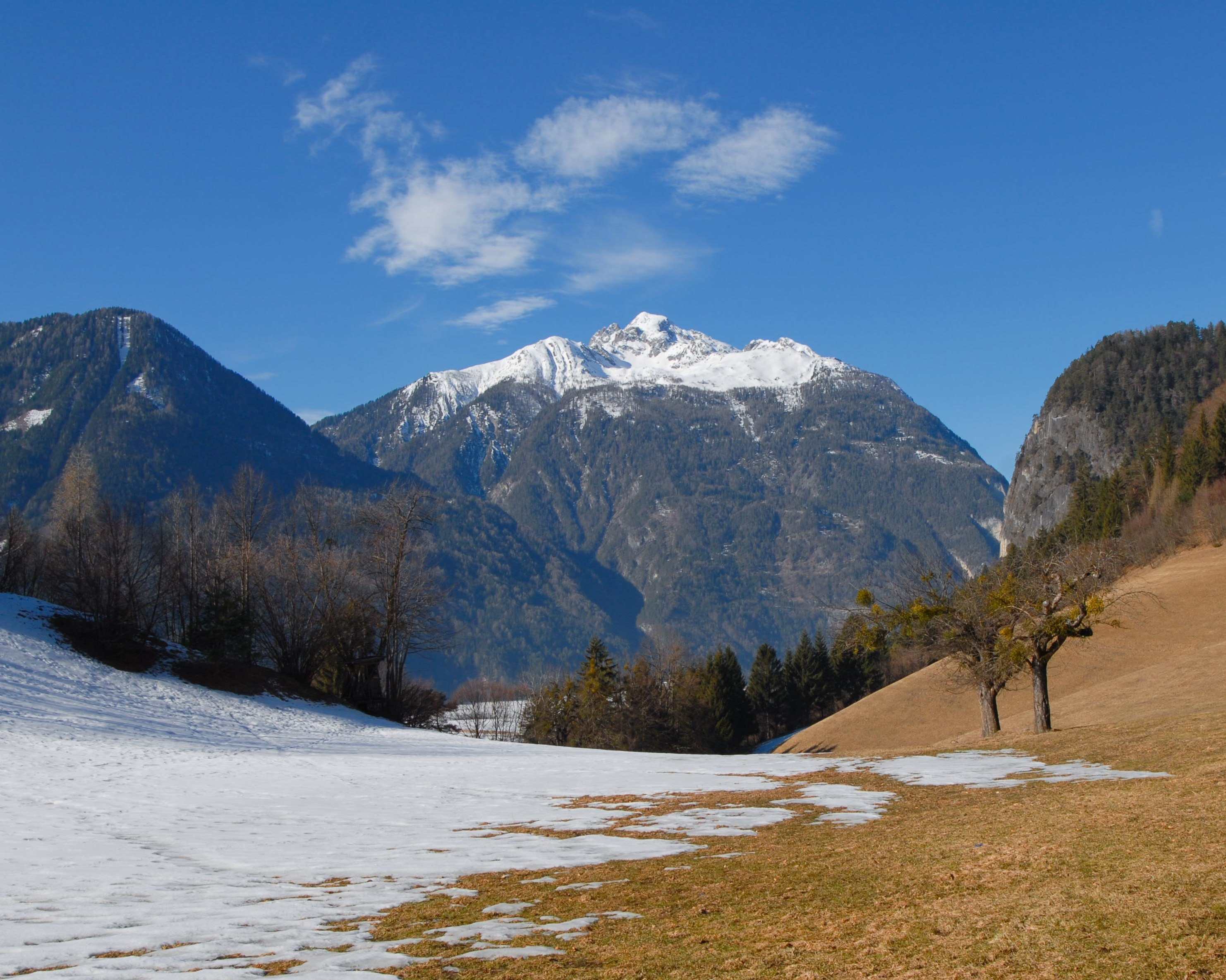
- Hochstadel

Highest point
- Elevation: 2,681 m (8,796 ft)
- Prominence: 386 m (1,266 ft)
- Coordinates: 46°45′36″N 12°51′24″E

Geography
- Location within Alps
- Location: Carinthia, Austria
- Parent range: Lienz Dolomites

Hochstadel (2,681 m) is a mountain of the Lienz Dolomites in Carinthia, Austria.

A solitary peak on the eastern edge of the range, it's towering 1,300 m high north face represents one of the toughest climbs in the Eastern Alps.

The normal route is from the east-west Drei Törl Weg (Three Passes Trail) which passes at the southern foot of the mountain.

The extensive views from its summit include the rest of Lienz Dolomites, the High Tauern to the north and the Carnic Alps to the south.
