= Lienz Dolomites =

Mountain range in Austria

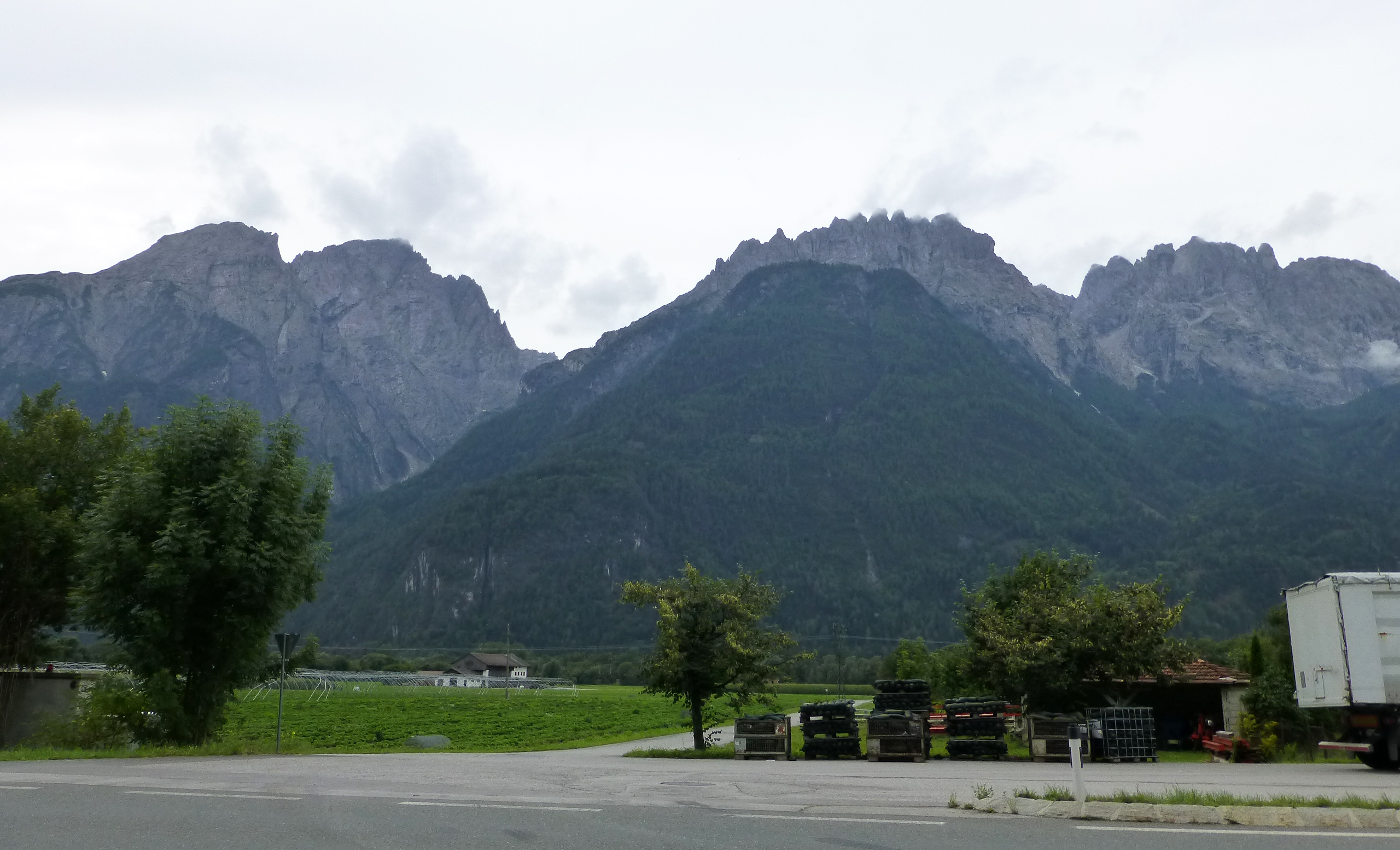
- A view of the Lienz Dolomites from the south

Highest point
- Peak: Große Sandspitze
- Elevation: 2,770 m (9,090 ft)
- Coordinates: 46°45′25″N 12°45′00″E

Geography
- Location within Alps
- Country: Austria
- Region(s): East Tyrol and Carinthia
- Parent range: Gailtal Alps

The Lienz Dolomites are an alpine mountain range located in the Austrian states of East Tyrol and Carinthia. It lies at the western side of the wider Gailtal Alps and contains its highest peaks. The range lies between the Drau Valley in the north and the Lesachtal to the south (where the Gail river flows).

Its most notable summits include the Große Sandspitze at 2,770 m, the Spitzkofel (2,717 m), the Hochstadel (2,681 m), the Laserzwand (2,614 m), and the Eggenkofel (2,591 m).

== Geology ==
The highest central peaks of the Lienz Dolomites (the Große Sandspitze, the Laserzwand, the Spitzkofel and the Hochstadel) are formed of the Hauptdolomit, which also dominates the Dolomite mountains to the south. However the Dolomite mountains lie to the south of the Periadriatic line and the Lienz Dolomites are located to the north of that structure so geologically they are part of the Central Eastern Alps rather than being part of the southern Alps. The whole sequence of rocks exposed in the Lienz Dolomites was thrust to the north in the course of the Alpine orogeny.
