= Tristacher See =

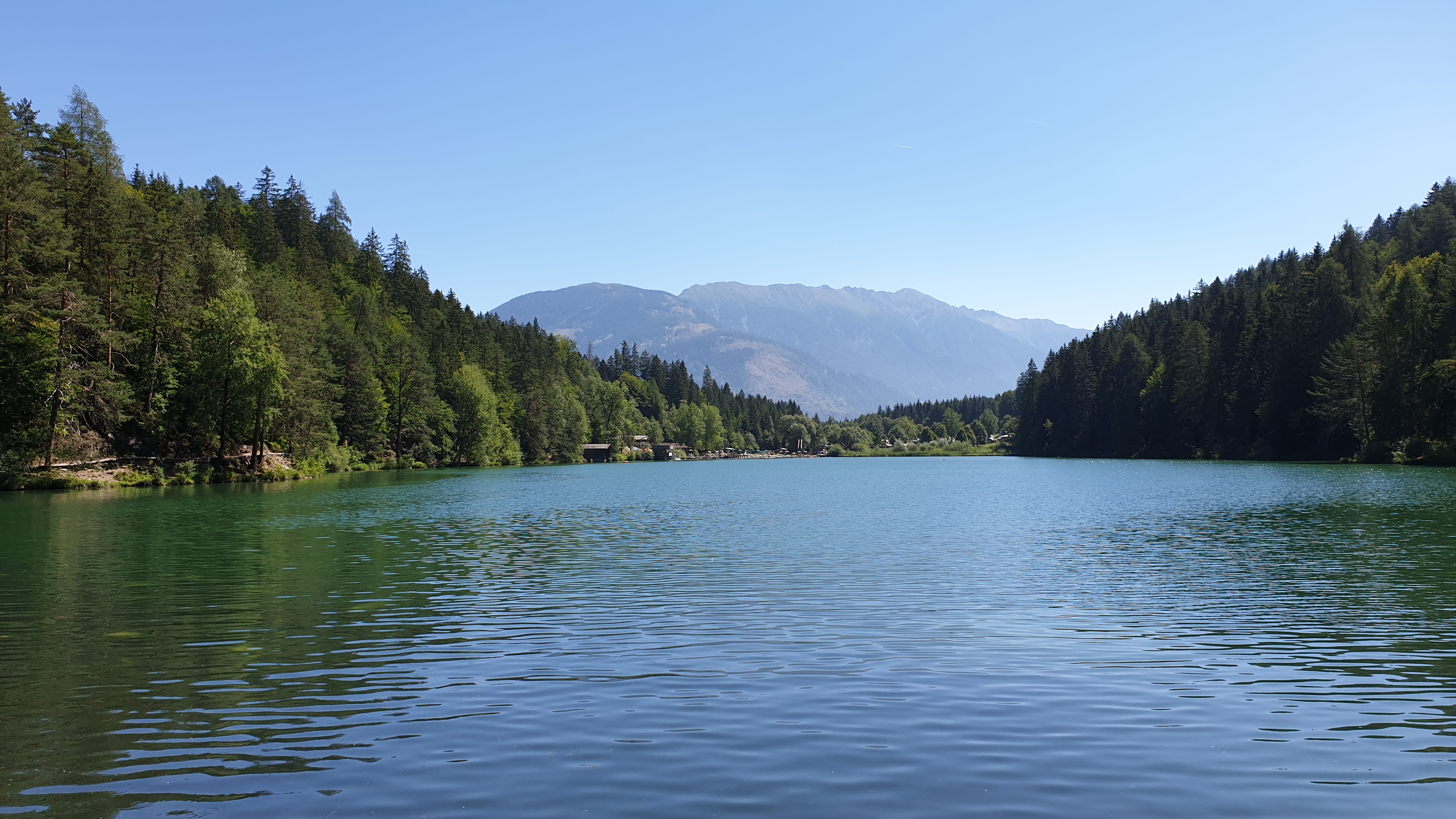

- Location within Austria
- Location: Tyrol, Austria
- Coordinates: 46°48′N 12°48′E
- Type: lake

Tristacher See is a lake of Tyrol, Austria.

== Geography ==
Lake Tristach, located 5 kilometers from Lienz, lies at the foot of the Rauchkofel mountain . It covers an area of 5.54 hectares, is 490 meters long and 250 meters wide, and has a maximum depth of 7.3 meters. It lies at an altitude of 821 metres (2,694 ft) and is accessible via two roads: one to the western shore and the other to the eastern shore.

The visibility depth in the lake is 2.5 to 3.5 meters.

The only inflow is a small stream from the Old Lake, which lies about 25 meters higher to the west. The catchment area covers 1.7 square kilometers. The outflow also occurs to the west, into the Seebach stream, which flows into the Drava River.

== History ==
In 2010, a dugout canoe from the Middle Ages was found at the bottom of the lake. The lake was first mentioned in writing in the fishing book of Emperor Maximilian I in the 16th century. In 1886, a power plant to utilize the lake's hydropower was planned. However, this plan was not implemented.

== Public use ==
Lake Tristach is the only natural bathing lake in East Tyrol. The water quality was excellent between 2013 and 2021.

On the eastern shore there is a lido and a campsite, and on the western shore there is a hotel. Otherwise, the lake is surrounded by forest. The average water temperature in summer is 21 to 24 degrees Celsius.
