= Kartitsch Saddle =

Austrian mountain pass

Kartitsch Saddle (Kartitscher Sattel)
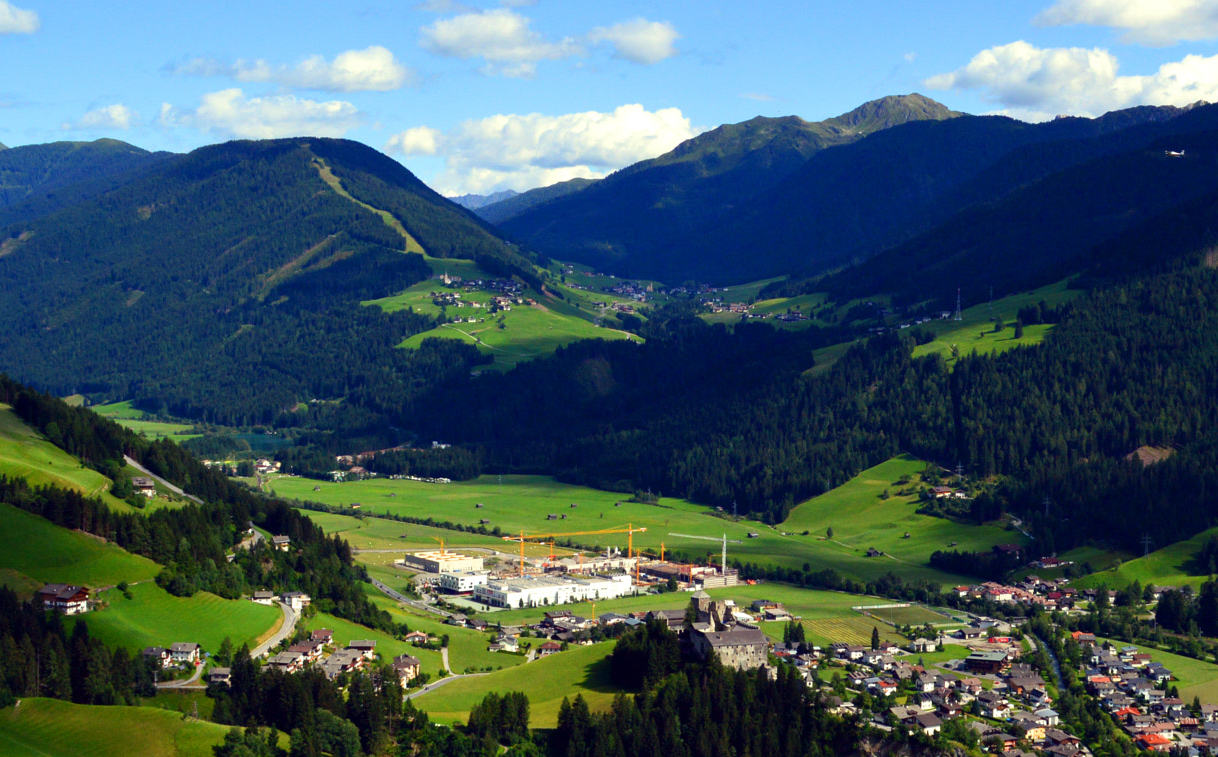
- View over Heinfels, Kartitscher saddle in the background

- Location within Alps
- Elevation: 1,530 m (5,020 ft)

Third Approach
- Location: Austria
- Range: Alps
- Coordinates: 46°43′05″N 12°32′27″E

The Kartitsch Saddle (German: Kartitscher Sattel) (elevation 1,530m) is a high mountain pass in Austria between the Dolomites and the Carnic Alps in the Bundesland of Tyrol.

== See also ==
- List of highest paved roads in Europe
- List of mountain passes
