= Schlatenkees =

Glacier in Austria

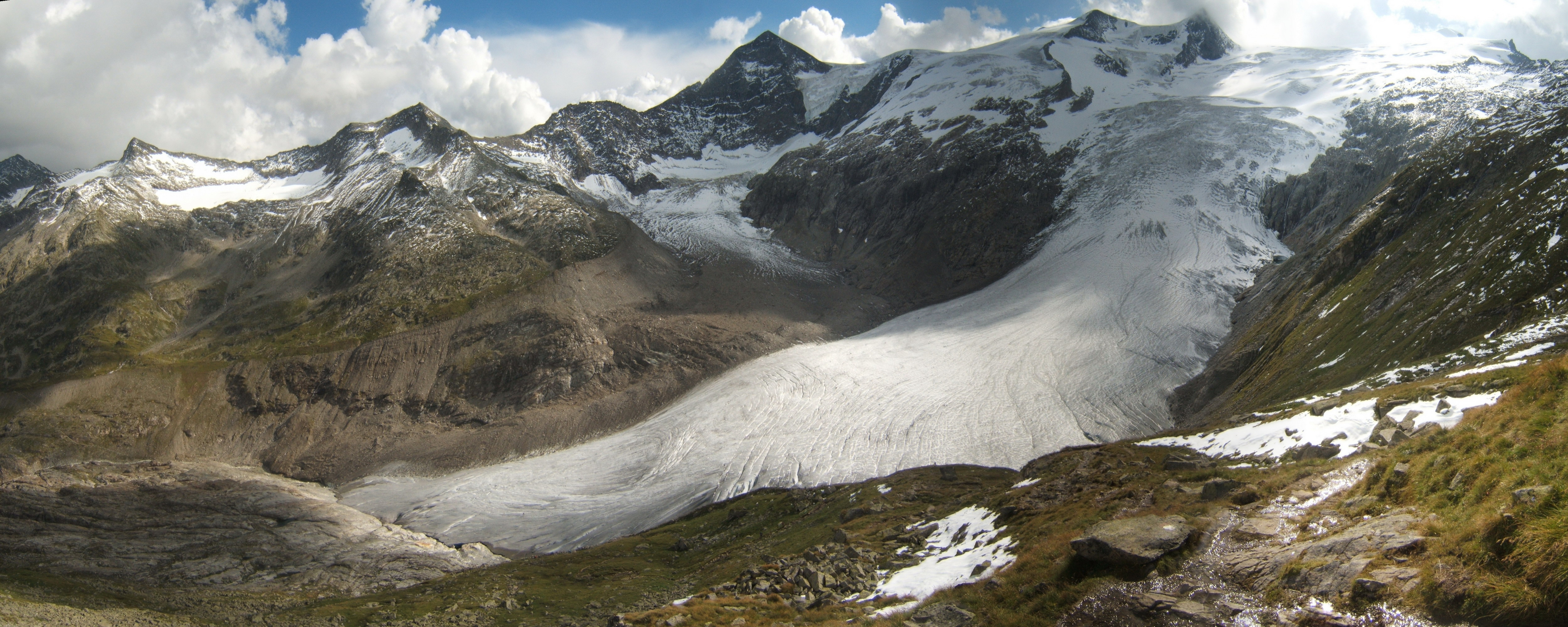
- Schlatenkees from the northeast, from the Alte Prager Hütte (2005)

- Location within Austria
- Type: Valley glacier
- Location: East Tyrol, Austria
- Coordinates: 47.110278°N 12.38°E
- Area: 9.28 square kilometres (3.58 sq mi)
- Length: 6.1 kilometres (3.8 mi) (2010)
- Thickness: 41–105 metres (135–344 ft) (1987)
- Highest elevation: 3,670 metres (12,040 ft)
- Lowest elevation: 2,100 metres (6,900 ft)

The Schlatenkees is a glacier in the Venediger Group that is in the core zone of the High Tauern National Park, east of the Großvenediger. It is in the East Tyrolean community of Matrei in Osttirol. With an area of around 9 square kilometres (3.5 sq mi), the Schlatenkees is the largest valley glacier in East Tyrol and, after the Obersulzbachkees, the second largest glacier in the Venediger group. The exposure is mainly to the east, in the highest area also to the south-east.

== Description ==
The relatively flat Accumulation zone of the glacier is known as the Upper Keesboden. It is framed by the highest peaks of the Venediger group: Großvenediger: 3,667 metres (12,031 ft), Kleinvenediger: 3,470 metres (11,380 ft), Hohes Aderl: 3,504 metres (11,496 ft), Rainerhorn: 3,559 metres (11,677 ft), Schwarze Wand: 3,511 metres (11,519 ft) and Hoher Zaun: 3,467 metres (11,375 ft).

The glacier flows over a mighty icefall to the Lower Keesboden, a flat area at an altitude of about 2,300 metres (7,500 ft). A partial glacier flows into the Lower Keesboden from the south, coming from the Kristallwand. The small jagged end of the tongue is at an altitude of 2,100 metres (6,900 ft), above a steep step. The northern part of the tongue is largely free of debris, while the southern end of the tongue, which forms the end of the stream coming from the Kristallwand, is completely covered by debris.

At the end of the tongue there was a clearly visible glacier gate from which the Schlatenbach exited until the summer of 2014. The Schlatenbach joins the Vilhabenbach in the valley floor of the Gschlösstal, and these form the Gschlössbach, which drains into the Black Sea via the Tauernbach, Isel, Drau and Danube.

The glacier gate collapsed in the late summer of 2014, there has been no glacier front since 2017. The Lower Keesboden is furrowed and rich in crevices, instead of the former arch, large, deep funnels show up. For this reason, a warning is issued against stepping on the ice - the edges can be brittle and there are often wide gaps in the edge towards the rock. Slipping on the rubble-strewn rock carries the risk of slipping under the ice sheet. Between 1988 and 2018 the Schlatenkees retreated by 470 metres (1,540 ft), two thirds of this after 2005 and from 2014 to 2017 alone by 180 metres (590 ft). In 2019, the retreat was almost 70 metres (230 ft). In 2019, the retreat was almost 70 metres (230 ft).

At the last peak of the glacier around 1850, the glacier still flowed over the steep step below the current end of the tongue down to the floor of the Gschlöss valley. It completely crossed the valley and reached up 20 to 25 metres (66 to 82 ft) on the opposite slope. The end of the tongue was at an altitude of 1,720 metres (5,640 ft) and was the deepest glacier end in the entire Eastern Alps. Since then, the glacier has continuously shrunk apart from brief interruptions. The Innergschlöß glacier path was built in 1978 in an area that was then still covered by the glacier, now on the slope below the glacier, .

== Gallery ==
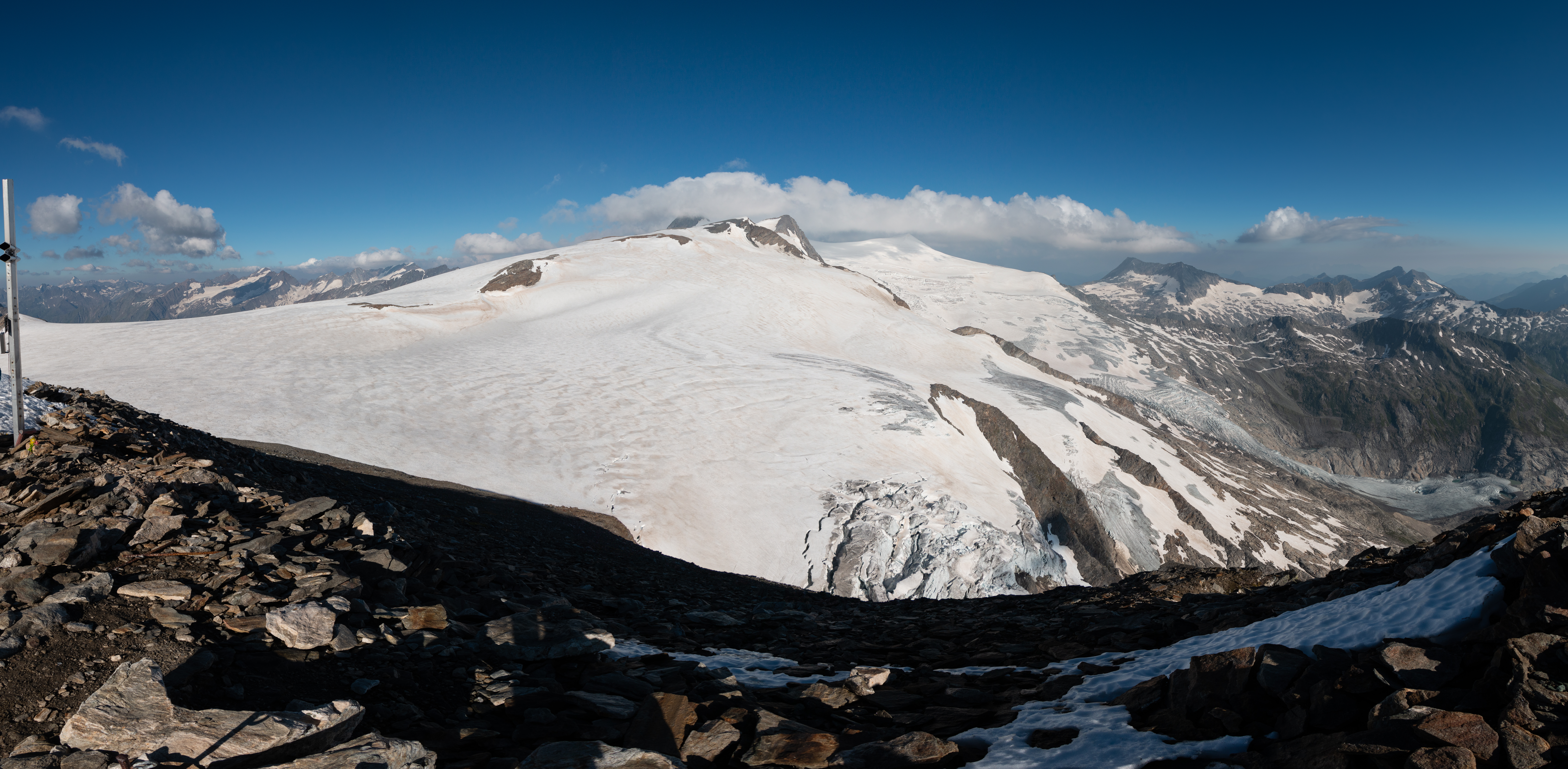
Upper Keesboden of the Schlatenkees, from the crystal wall

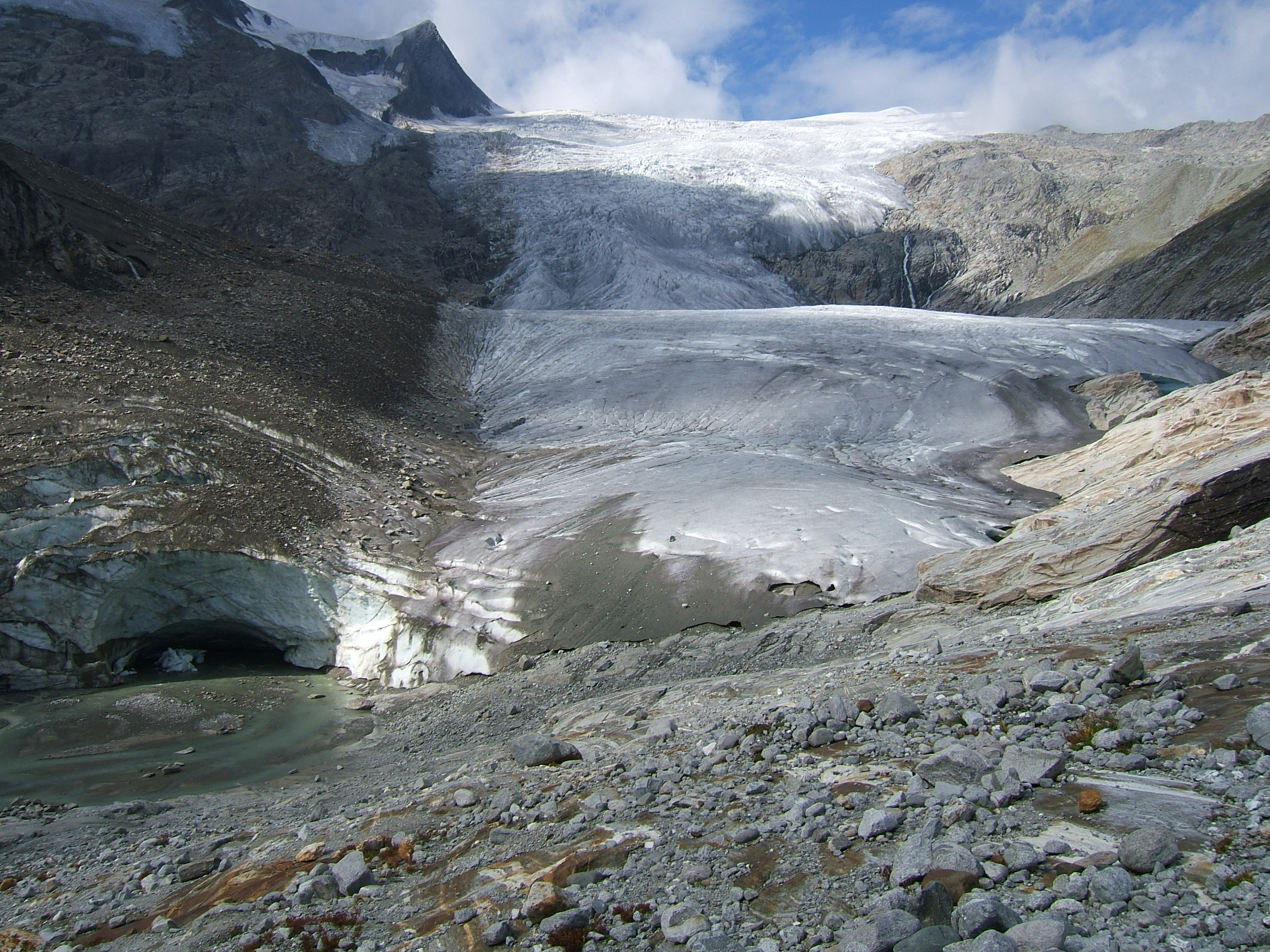
Tongue and Glacier Gate in 2011

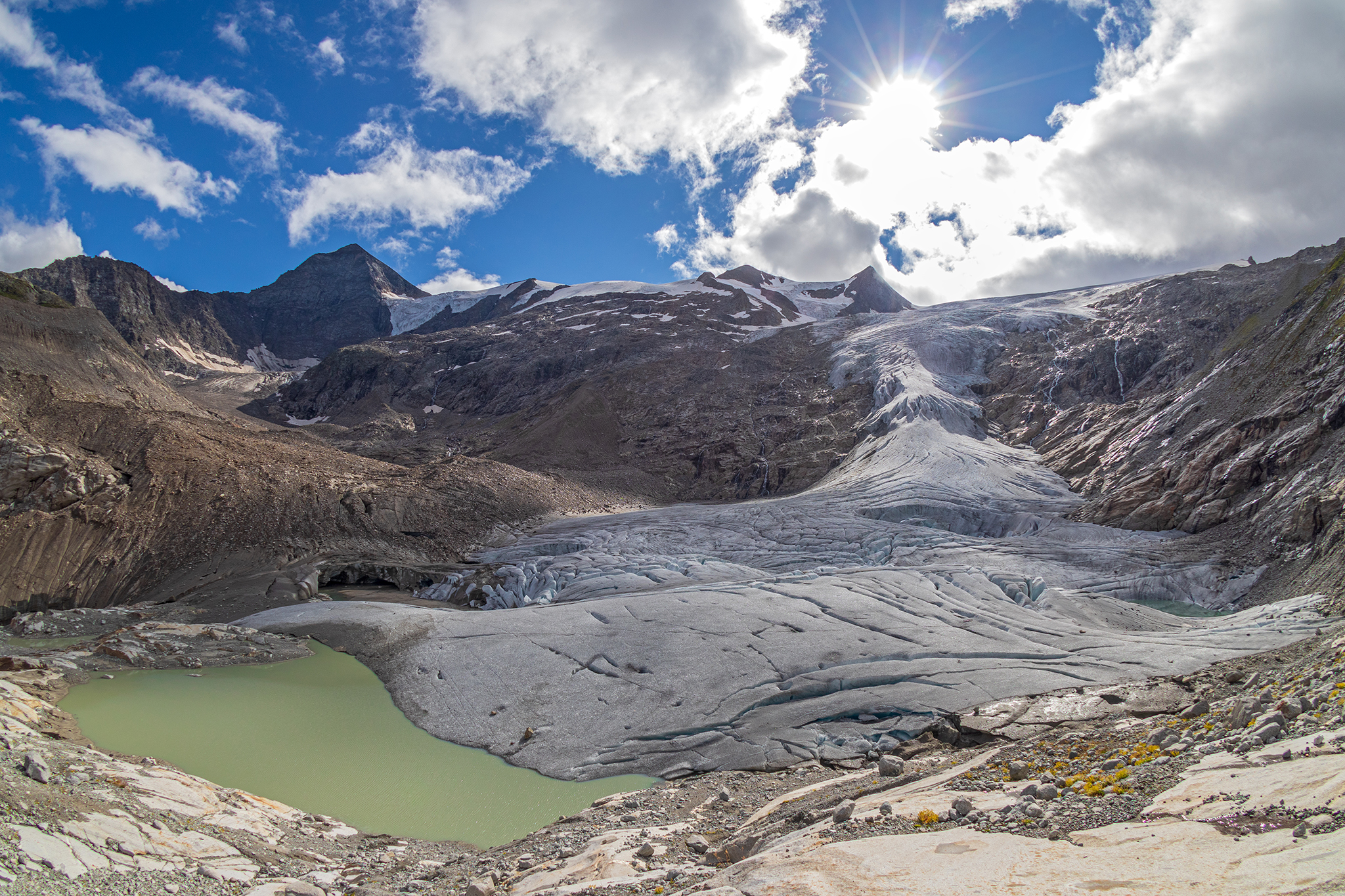
Unterer Keesboden 2020

== Sources ==
- Schaber, Susanne (2020-07-03), "Bis ans Ende der Welt", Frankfurter Allgemeine (in German)
- Schlosser, Hannes (2018), Österreichischer Alpenverein, Abteilung Raumplanung und Naturschutz (ed.), Gletscherweg Innergschlöß Venedigergruppe, Naturkundlicher Führer (in German) (5 ed.), Innsbruck
- "Seismische Eisdickenmessungen österreichischer Gletscher" (PDF), Archiv für Lagerstättenforschung der Geologischen Bundesanstalt, 8, Wien: Universität Wien, Zentralanstalt für Meteorologie und Geodynamik: 27ff, 1987
- Stüber, Eberhard; Winding, Norbert (2003), Erlebnis Nationalpark Hohe Tauern. Band Tirol, Tiroler Nationalparkfonds Hohe Tauern, p. 69, ISBN 3-7022-1937-4
- World Glacier Monitoring Service (WGMS) (2012), Fluctuations of Glaciers Database, Zurich: WGMS: World Glacier Monitoring Service, doi:10.5904/wgms-fog-2012-11
