= Schlieferspitze =

Mountain in the Venediger Group of the Alps

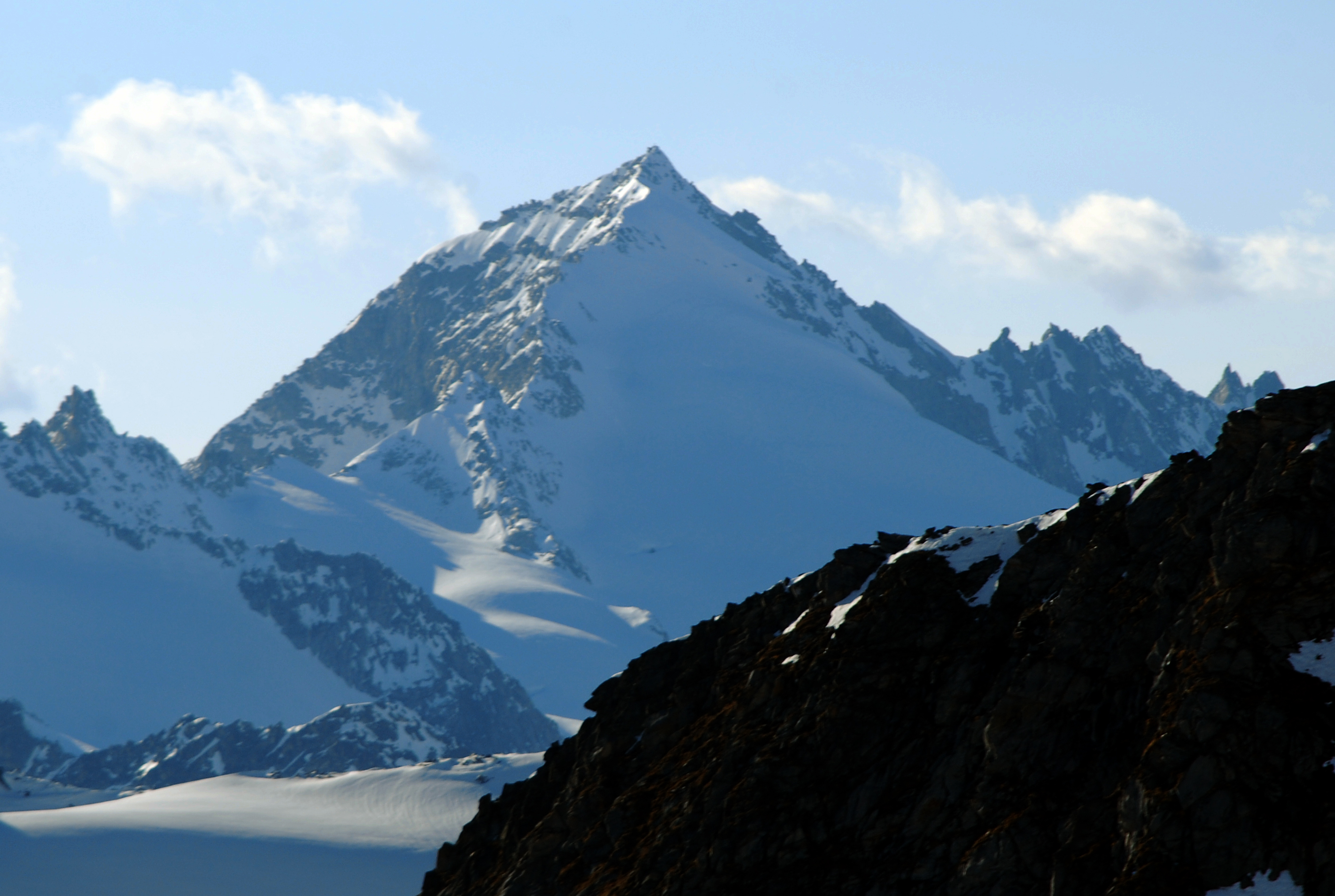
- The Schlieferspitze and Eastern Sonntagkees from the southeast

Highest point
- Elevation: 3,290 m (AA) (10,790 ft)
- Prominence: 511 m ↓ Krimmler Törl
- Isolation: 4.5 km → Hinterer Maurerkeeskopf
- Listing: Alpine mountains above 3000 m
- Coordinates: 47°07′23″N 12°14′34″E

Geography
- Location within Austria
- Parent range: Venediger Group

Climbing
- First ascent: 22 August 1871 by Eduard Richter and Johann Stüdl
- Normal route: from the Warnsdorfer Hut along the southwest arête

The Schlieferspitze is a mountain, 3,290 m (AA), on the ridge known as the Krimmler Kamm in the Venediger Group of the Alps. The ridge lies in the northwest of the High Tauern, part of the Austrian Central Alps in the Austrian federal state of Salzburg. The summit is the highest on the Krimmler Kamm and is described in the sources as one of the most attractive peaks in the Venediger Group. From the valleys of the Krimmler Achental to the southwest and the Obersulzbachtal to the northeast it appears as an extremely dominant mountain. Long and evenly formed arêtes, about two kilometres long, run from the summit to the northwest, northeast, southeast and southwest. The mountain was first ascended on 22 August 1871 by Eduard Richter, professor of geography at the University of Graz, and Johann Stüdl, a merchant from Prague and co-founder of the German Alpine Club.

== Surrounding area ==
To the north, east and west of the Schlieferspitze are glaciers, known as kees, that climb to a height of over 3,100 metres. To the north is the Rear Jaidbachkees (Hinterjaidbachkees), to the east, the Eastern Sonntagkees (Östliche Sonntagkees), and to the west, the Western Jaidbachkees (Westliche Jaidbachkees).

The northeast arête runs down to the Obersulzbachtal valley, the southwest arête, known as the Rinderwand, descends to the Krimmler Achental. Important neighbouring peaks lies on the Spitze's northwest and southeast arêtes. One kilometre away to the northwest lies the Jaidbachspitze (3,100 m) and another 1,000 metres beyond is the Unlaßkarkopf which reaches a height of 3,074 m. One and a half kilometres away on the southeastern arête lie the two towers of the Schliefertürme (the southeast tower at 3,142 m and the northwest tower at 3,126 m) and a few hundred metres beyond them is the Hohe Sonntagskopf at 3,136 m

Important settlements in the wider area are the village of Ströden in the upper Virgental valley in East Tyrol, a good 13 kilometres away to the southeast as the crow flies, and Krimml on the Gerlos Straße in the state of Salzburg which is about 12 kilometres away to the north-northwest.

== Bases and ascent ==
The route used by the first climbers in 1871 led from the Johannis Hut (2,121 m), a long way to the southeast in the Dorfertal valley and headed in a northeasterly direction. According to the original account, they then went over the Obersulzbachtörl (2,918 m) and circumnavigated the expansive Obersulzbachferner glacier in a wide arc to the west almost as far as the Krimmler Törl (2,776 m). They then crossed the Western Sonntagskees, and advanced up several rocky ridges, with randklufts and hollows, not shown on the contemporary Alpine Club map. Finally they made their way along the southeastern arête to the summit of the Schlieferspitze after 7 1/2 hours. On the same day, the two alpinists also climbed the Prägraten am Großvenediger. The first winter ascent of the Schlieferspitze was made by a group of skiers with F. Müller on 17 April 1908.

Today the base for an ascent of the Schlieferspitze is the Warnsdorfer Hut to the south in the upper Krimmler Achental valley at 2,336 metres. The normal route to the top heads in a northerly direction to the southwest arête and then continues up a steep gradient classified, according to the literature as a UIAA grade II- climb to the summit cross. The journey time is about 3 1/2 hours. From 1904 to 1934 climbing routes were opened up the faces and flanks of the Spitze; however these are no longer used due to the high risk of rockfalls.

== Literature and maps ==
- Willi End: Venedigergruppe, Alpine Club Guide, Munich, 2006, ISBN 3-7633-1242-0
- Eduard Richter: Erschliessung der Ostalpen, Vol. III, Verlag des Deutschen und Oesterreichischen Alpenvereins, Berlin, 1894
- Alpine Club map 1:25,000 series, Sheet 36, Venedigergruppe
