= Simonyspitzen =

Two mountain summits in the Venediger Group of the Austrian Central Alps

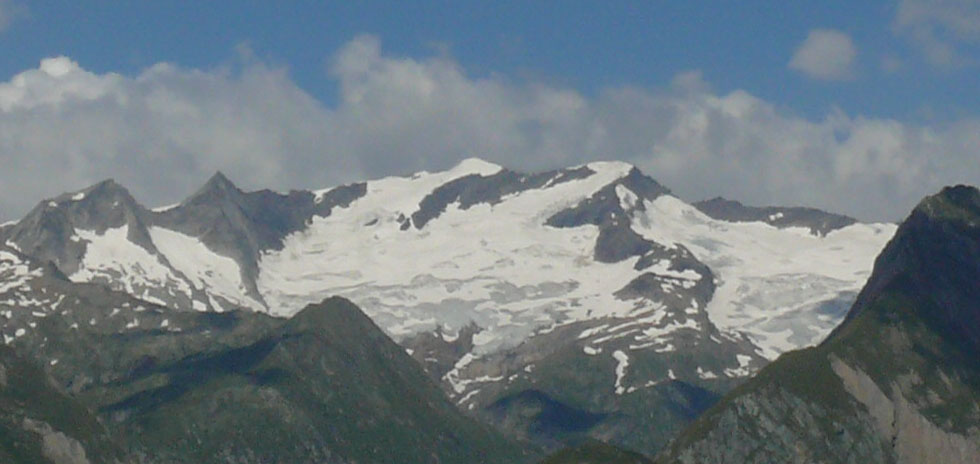
- The Simonyspitzen from the southeast (Muhsweg). Left: the two Gubachspitzen.

Highest point
- Elevation: 3,473 m (AA) (11,394 ft)
- Prominence: 102 m ↓ Umbalscharte
- Isolation: 1.6 km → Dreiherrnspitze
- Coordinates: 47°04′21″N 12°15′36″E

Geography
- Location within Alps
- Location: Salzburg and Tyrol, Austria
- Parent range: Venediger Group

Climbing
- First ascent: 28 July 1871 by Theodor Harpprecht with guide, Josef Schnell

The Simonyspitzen are two mountain summits in the Venediger Group of the Austrian Central Alps. They lie within the High Tauern National Park on the border between the Austrian states of East Tyrol and Salzburg.

They were given their name at a meeting of the Austrian Alpine Club on 15 March 1865 at the request of cartographer, Franz Keil who wanted to honour the geographer and Alpine researcher, Friedrich Simony. The peaks were first climbed on 28 July 1871 by Stuttgarter alpinist, Theodor Harpprecht and mountain guide, Josef Schnell.

== Location and elevation ==
According to official surveys by the Federal Office of Metrology and Surveying, the Western Simonyspitze (Westliche Simonyspitze, 47°04′21″N 12°15′36″E) is the higher of the two tops at 3,473 m (AA). The Eastern Simonyspitze (Östliche Simonyspitze, 47°04′30″N 12°16′02″E) to the northeast, reaches 3,442 m. According to other sources both peaks are 3,488 m.

To the north, on the Salzburg side, the mountains drop into the glacier of Krimmler Kees above the valley of Krimmler Achental. To the south (East Tyrol) the Simonykees flows into the Maurertal valley.

To the west, an arête runs across to the 3,426 m high Umbalköpfl and the 3,499-metre-high Dreiherrenspitze.Immediately to the southwest of the Western Simonyspitze is the 3,440-metre-high Simonyschneide (47°04′17.6″N 12°15′30.7″E). It is often wrongly called the Western Simonyspitze. Likewise the 3,415-metre-high arête between the two Simonyspitzen is often described in many sources as the "Simonyschneid" or "Simonyschneide".

To the northeast the chain continues to the 3,225 m high Vorderer Maurerkeeskopf.

== Alpinism ==
The firn-covered Eastern Simonyspitze is important from a mountaineering perspective, but is not often climbed. The normal route along the southeastern arête is rated as UIAA grade II. The start point for the roughly 4 hour ascent is the Essener-Rostocker Hut (2,208 m) in the Maurertal valley. Other routes run up the south flank (II), east flank (III−), northeastern arête (III) and Western Hanging Glacier (Westlichen Hängegletscher, III+). The North Face (IV) is the most difficult climb and may also be reached via the Western Hanging Glacier from the Warnsdorfer Hut (2,336 m) in the Krimmler Achental. The summit is also ascended in winter up the Simonykees as a ski tour.

The Western Simonyspitze is rarely visited; most alpinists only climb up to the Simonyschneide in front of it. The normal way runs from the southwest to the summit at grade II. Of climbing interest are the northwestern arête, an ice tour from the Krimmler Kees, the North Face (combined terrain V−, 50°) and the ice climb up the North Face, at 65°, one of the steepest ice tours in the Venediger Group. Other genuine glacier climbs like the South Flank or the Northwestern Hanging Glacier (Nordwestliche Hängegletscher) are considered dangerous and frequently impassible. In winter the Simonyschneide to the southwest is a popular ski touring destination.

The crossing between the Western and Eastern Simonyspitze along a frequently corniced arête and the Harpprechtturm tower is assessed as grade III.

== Name and climbing history ==
The name of the mountain was proposed in 1865 by the cartographer and topographer (Geoplastiker), Franz Keil, who named it after the geographer and alpine researcher, Friedrich Simony. Hitherto the Eastern Simonyspitze had frequently been wrongly called the Großer Geiger. Today, in addition to the feminine form of the name (Simonyspitze), the masculine versions also occur (i.e. Westlicher and Östlicher Simonyspitz) in German.

The first ascent of both summits was achieved on 28 July 1871 by Theodor Harpprecht and Josef Schnell. They climbed up the present-day normal route to the Eastern Simonyspitze, crossed the linking arête and came down from the Western Simonyspitze over the South Flank. On 2 August that year they also made the first ascent of the Simonyschneide. Ludwig Purtscheller and Johann Grill, who first ascended the south flank (1881) and northeastern arête (1882) of the Eastern Simonyspitze, two more well-known alpinists were added to the climbing history of the Simonyspitzen.

== Literature ==
- Willi End (2006), German Alpine Club; Austrian Alpine Club; South Tyrol Alpine Club (eds.), Alpine Club Guide Venedigergruppe (in German) (5 ed.), Munich: Bergverlag Rother, ISBN 3-7633-1242-0
