= Zopetspitze =

Mountain in Austria

- Zopatspitze, Zopetspitz
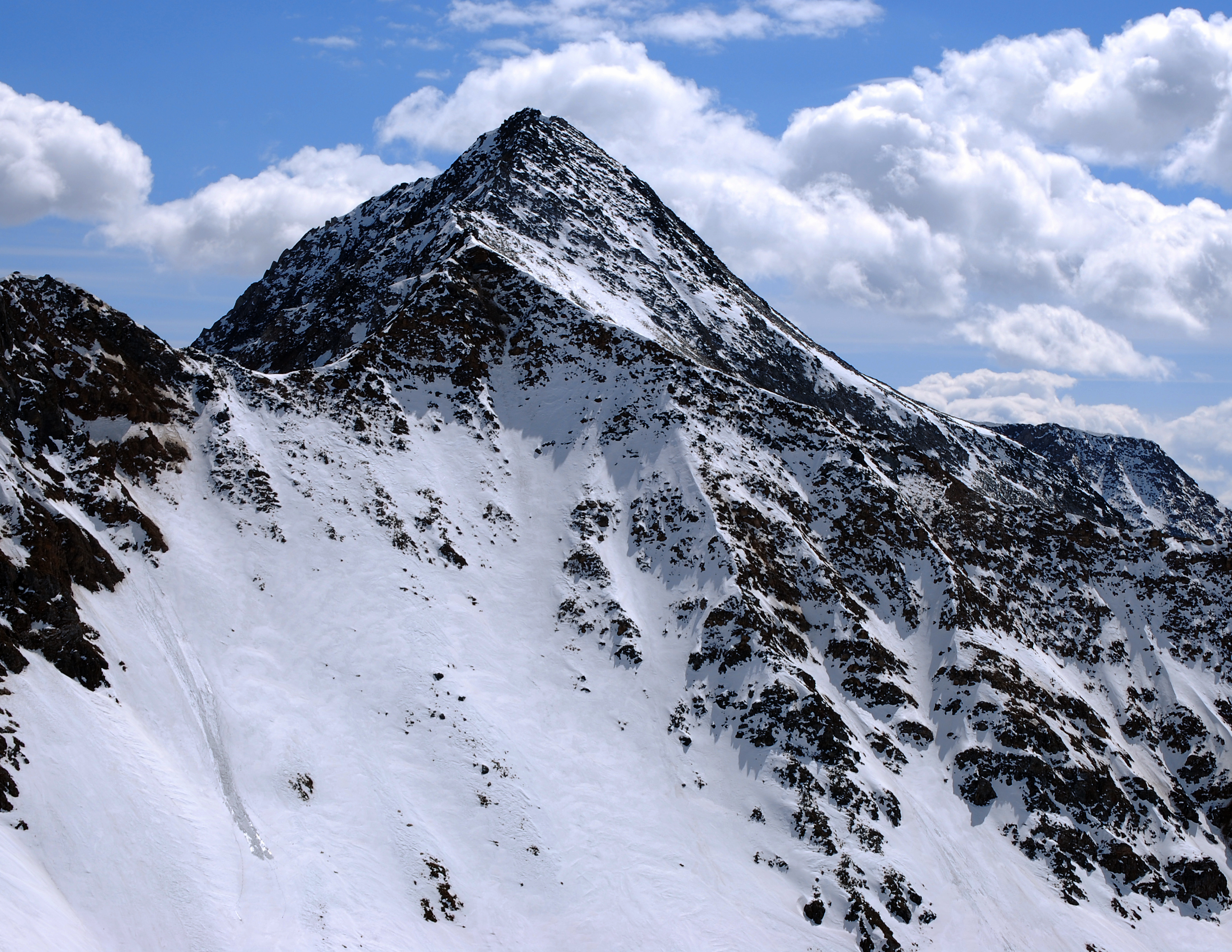
- North aspect

Highest point
- Elevation: 3,198 m (10,492 ft)
- Prominence: 246 m (807 ft)
- Parent peak: Großvenediger
- Isolation: 3.22 km (2.00 mi)
- Coordinates: 47°03′26″N 12°21′42″E

Geography
- Location within Alps Location within Austria
- Interactive map of Zopetspitze
- Country: Austria
- State: Tyrol
- Protected area: High Tauern National Park
- Parent range: Alps; High Tauern; Venediger Group
- Topo map: Tabacco 36 Alpenvereinskarte Venedigergruppe

Geology
- Rock age: Paleozoic
- Rock type: Metamorphic rock

Climbing
- First ascent: August 14, 1898

Zopetspitze is a mountain in Tyrol, Austria.

== Description ==
Zopetspitze is a 3,198-meter-elevation (10,492-foot) summit in the Venediger Group which is a subrange of the High Tauern. The mountain is located in Lienz District, 38 kilometers (23.6 miles) northwest of the Austrian town of Lienz and four kilometers (2.5 miles) north of the municipality of Prägraten am Großvenediger. Precipitation runoff from the mountain's slopes drains into tributaries of the Isel. Topographic relief is significant as the summit rises 1,200 meters (3,937 feet) above the Dorfertal Valley in two kilometers (1.24 miles), and 1,900 meters (6,233 feet) above the Isel Valley in four kilometers (2.5 miles). The mountain is composed of a mix of gneiss and schist which are mainly of Paleozoic age and metamorphosed during the Alpine orogeny. The first ascent of the summit was made on August 14, 1898, by Heinrich von Ficker and Ludwig Prohaska via the north ridge (descent via the south-southeast ridge). The nearest higher mountain is Weißspitze, 3.2 kilometers (2 miles) to the northeast.

== Climate ==
Based on the Köppen climate classification, Zopetspitze is located in an alpine climate zone with long, cold winters, and short, mild summers. Weather systems are forced upwards by the mountains (orographic lift), causing moisture to drop in the form of rain and snow. The months of July through September offer the most favorable weather for visiting or climbing this mountain.

== Gallery ==
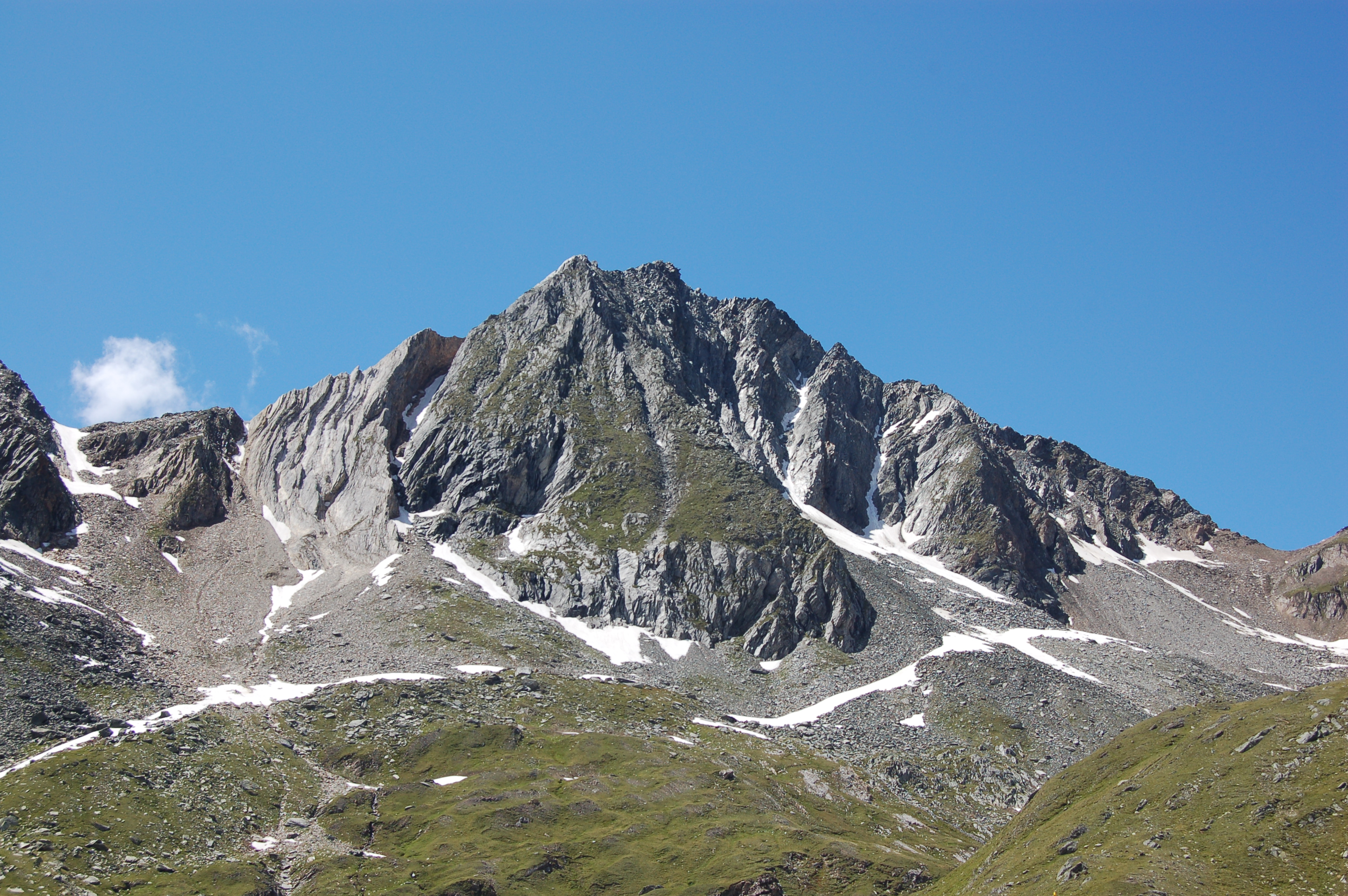
East aspect

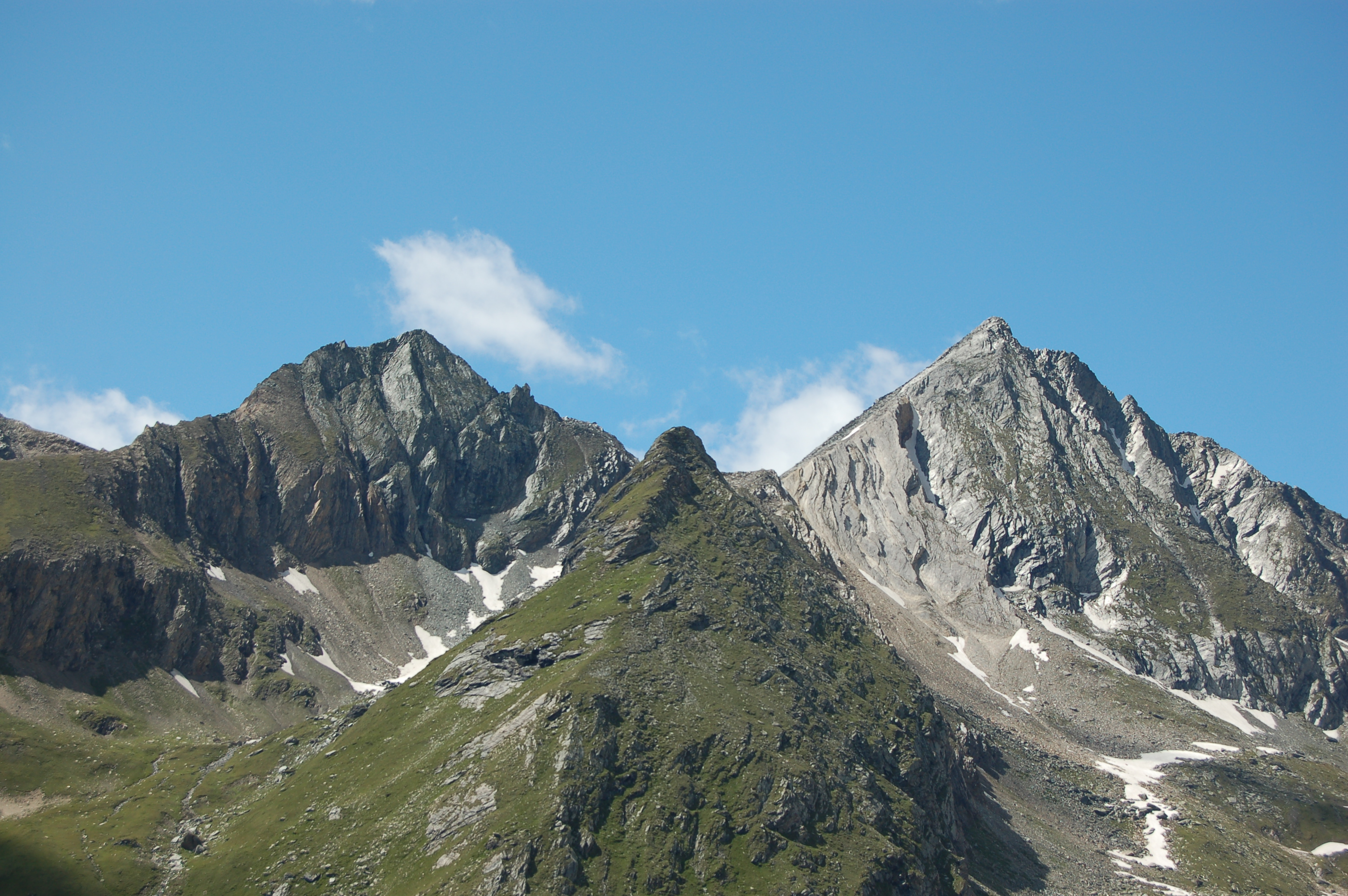
East aspect of Zopetspitze to the right
(Tulpspitze to left)

== See also ==
- Geography of the Alps
- Geology of the Alps
