= Venediger Group =

Mountain range in the Central Eastern Alps

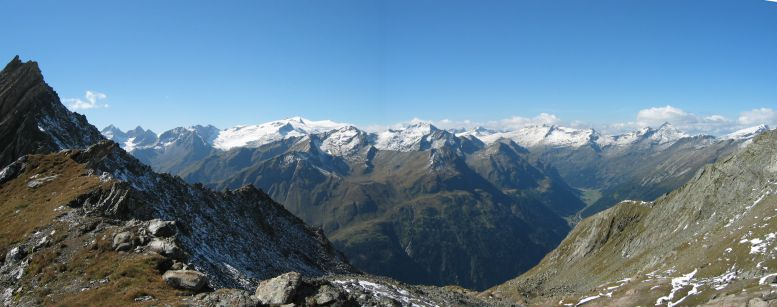
- View from Granatspitze Group

Highest point
- Peak: Großvenediger
- Elevation: 3,657 m (11,998 ft)
- Coordinates: 47°06′34″N 12°20′44″E

Geography
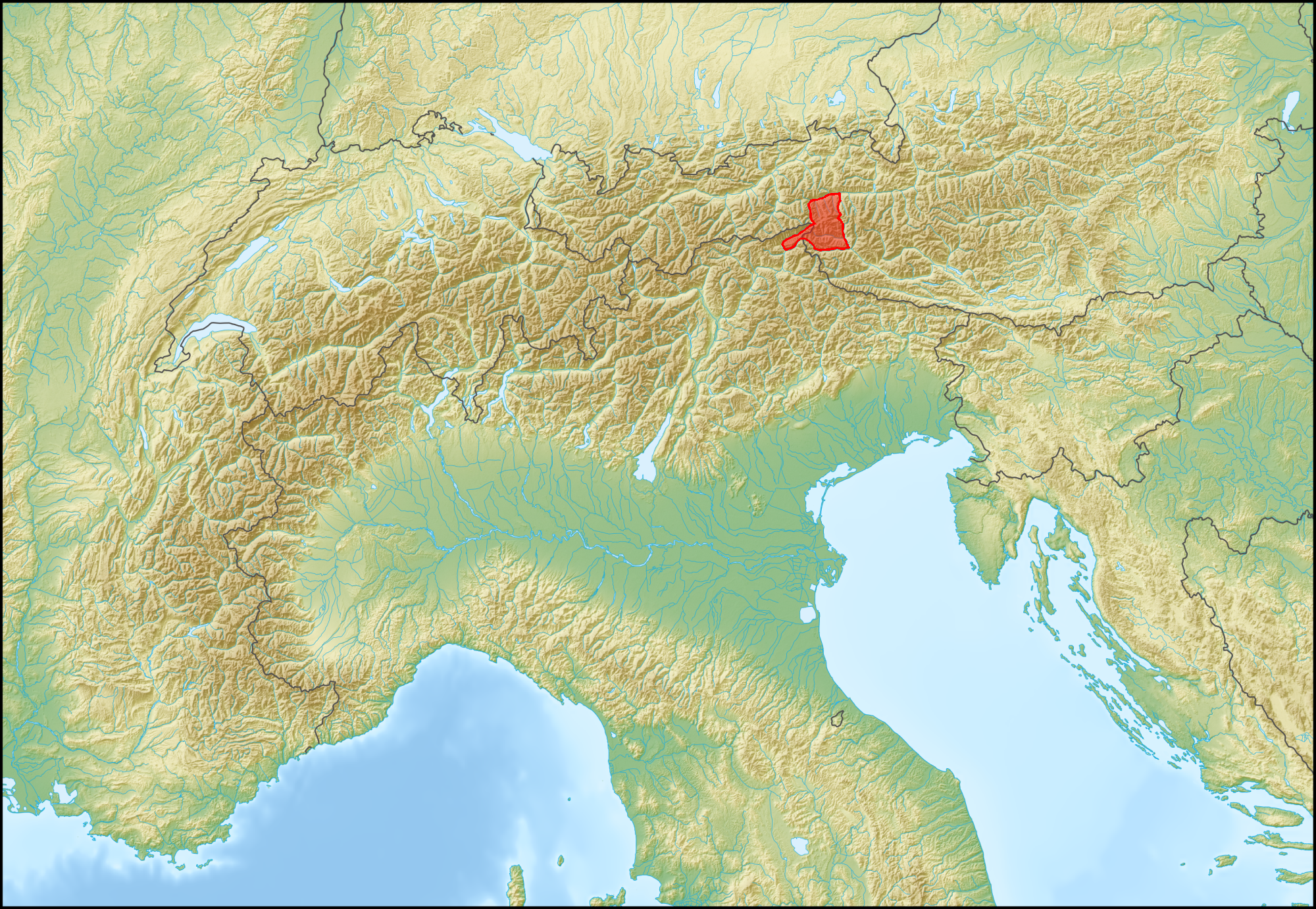
- Venediger Group (in red) within the Alps. The borders of the range according to Alpine Club classification of the Eastern Alps
- Countries: Austria and Italy
- States: Tyrol, Salzburg and South Tyrol
- Range coordinates: 47°05′32″N 12°18′18″E
- Parent range: High Tauern; Central Eastern Alps

Geology
- Rock type: Gneiss

The Venediger Group (German: Venedigergruppe) is a mountain range of the Central Eastern Alps. Together with the Granatspitze Group, the Glockner Group, the Goldberg Group, and the Ankogel Group, it forms the main ridge of the High Tauern. The highest peak is the Großvenediger at 3,657 m (AA), which gives its name to the group. Considerable parts of the Venediger Group belong to the core zone of the High Tauern National Park.

== Geography ==
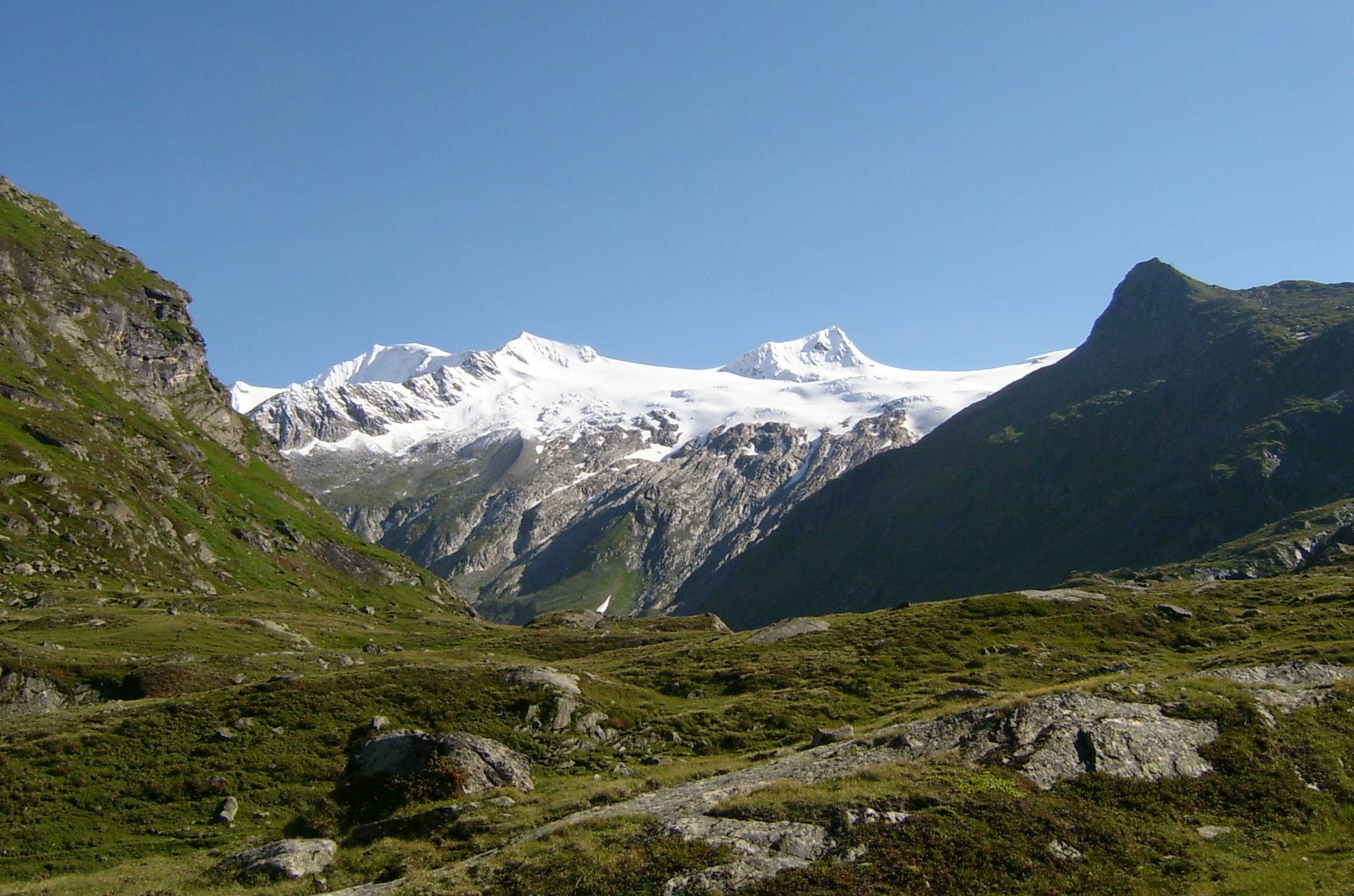
Großvenediger peak (highest point, rear left), view from Johannis Hut near Prägraten to the south

The Venediger Group is located in Austria in the federal states of Salzburg and Tyrol, and also in Italy in the autonomous province of South Tyrol. The greater part of the range lies in East Tyrol.

The Venediger Group includes the western part of the main chain of the High Tauern range. The Felber Tauern pass road runs across the Alpine crest between Salzburg and East Tyrol on the eastern side of the range. The Venediger Group is the most glaciated mountain range in the High Tauern. The renown of the main summit in the group, the Großvenediger, rather overshadows the other regions and mountains, though the group has a great number of peaks, mountain paths and Alpine huts.

The origin of its name is unclear. According to a legend, when local shepherds saw the giant mass of the Venediger glacier for the first time they thought they were looking at the glistening surface of the sea with a town (“Venice”). Nevertheless, the name may go back to medieval Welsh (Venetian) prospectors searching for Cobalt and Manganese ores in the area.

== Neighbouring ranges ==
The Venediger Group borders on the following other ranges in the Alps:

- Kitzbühel Alps (to the north)
- Granatspitze Group (to the east)
- Villgraten Mountains (to the south)
- Rieserferner Group (to the southwest)
- Zillertal Alps (to the west)

== Boundaries ==
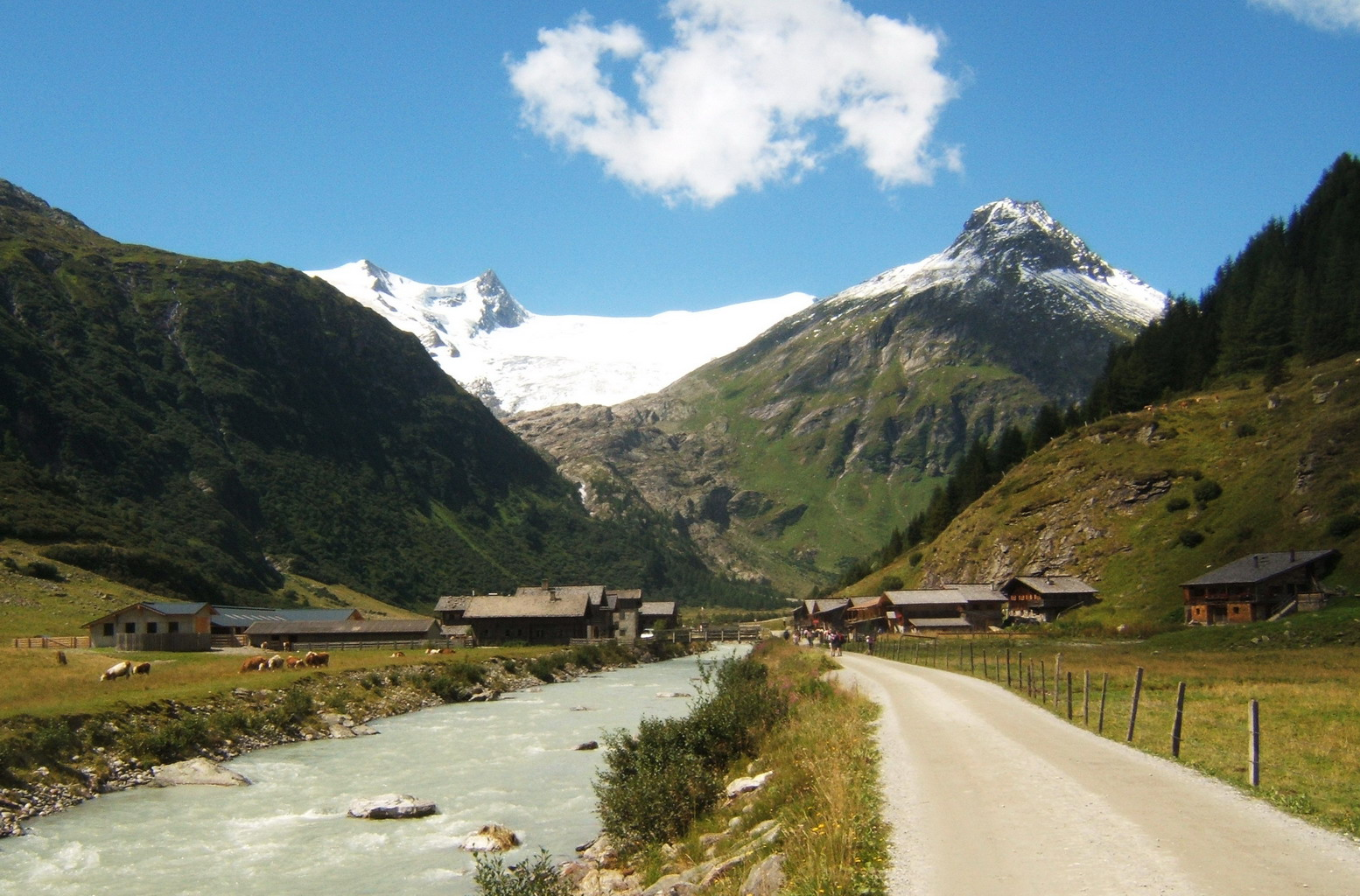
View from Gschlöß valley near Matrei, looking west

To the north the Oberpinzgau valley of the Salzach river forms the boundary from Krimml downstream to the town of Mittersill. To the east the boundary runs from Mittersill southwards up the Felberbach stream, over the Felber Tauern pass and continues down the Tauernbach to Matrei in Osttirol. From there it continues southwards along the Isel river to the village of Huben (part of the Matrei municipality). To the south the Defereggen Valley delineates the boundary from Huben along the Schwarzach heading upstream as far as the Jagdhaus alp and the Klammljoch pass. From the Klammljoch it runs downhill along the Klammlbach and through the South Tyrolean Rein valley to Sand in Taufers. In the west its perimeter runs along the Tauferer Ahrntal valley from Sand in Taufers up to Birnlücke Pass and down the Krimmler Ache to Krimml in the Salzach valley.

The Birnlücke links the Venediger Group with the Zillertal Alps. The Klammljoch is its junction with the Rieserferner Group. The Felber Tauern join the Venediger Group to the Granatspitze Group.

Whilst clearly defined side ridges regularly branch off northwards from the main chain of the Venediger Group, towards the south the mountain tend to sprawl over a larger area forming their own subgroups: the Durreck Group, the Panargenkamm and the Lasörling Group. Located between the heavily glaciated main crest and the Lasörling Group west of Matrei, the Virgen valley the only permanently settled valley within the Venediger Group.

== Peaks ==
All the named three-thousanders in the Venediger Group:

- Großvenediger, 3,666 m above sea level (AA)
- Rainerhorn, 3,559 m above sea level (AA)
- Hohes Aderl, 3,506 m above sea level (AA)
- Schwarze Wand, 3,503 m above sea level (AA)
- Dreiherrenspitze, 3,499 m above sea level (AA)
- Rötspitze, 3,496 m above sea level (AA)
- Western Simonyspitze, 3,481 m above sea level (AA)
- Kleinvenediger, 3,471 m above sea level (AA)
- Hoher Zaun, 3,451 m above sea level (AA)
- Eastern Simonyspitze, 3,448 m above sea level (AA)
- Umbalköpfl, 3,426 m above sea level (AA)
- Daberspitze, 3,402 m above sea level (AA)
- Hintere Gubachspitze, 3,387 m above sea level (AA)
- Hoher Eichham, 3,371 m above sea level (AA)
- Northern Malhamspitze, 3,368 m above sea level (AA)
- Großer Geiger, 3,360 m above sea level (AA)
- Großer Happ, 3,352 m above sea level (AA)
- Südliche Malhamspitze, 3,326 m above sea level (AA)
- Vorderer Maurerkeeskopf, 3,325 m above sea level (AA)
- Vordere Gubachspitze, 3,316 m above sea level (AA)
- Großer Hexenkopf, 3,314 m above sea level (AA)
- Hinterer Maurerkeeskopf, 3,311 m above sea level (AA)
- Kristallwand, 3,310 m above sea level (AA)
- Weißspitze, 3,300 m above sea level (AA)
- Keeskogel, 3,291 m above sea level (AA)
- Schlieferspitze, 3,290 m above sea level (AA)
- Untere Rötspitze, 3,289 m above sea level (AA)
- Mittlerer Maurerkeeskopf, 3,283 m above sea level (AA)
- Vorderer Seekopf, 3,282 m above sea level (AA)
- Quirl, 3,251 m above sea level (AA)
- Niederer Eichham, 3,247 m above sea level (AA)
- Stein am Ferner, 3,246 m above sea level (AA)
- Mullwitzaderl, 3,244 m above sea level (AA)
- Hohe Fürleg, 3,243 m above sea level (AA)
- Hinterer Seekopf, 3,234 m above sea level (AA)
- Steingrubenkogel, 3,231 m above sea level (AA)
- Althausschneide, 3,225 m above sea level (AA)
- Wunspitze, 3,217 m above sea level (AA)
- Säulkopf, 3,209 m above sea level (AA)
- Plattiger Habach, 3,207 m above sea level (AA)
- Hoher Rosshuf, 3,199 m above sea level (AA)
- Zopetspitze, 3,198 m above sea level (AA)
- Kleiner Hexenkopf, 3,194 m above sea level (AA)
- Kuhhaut, 3,190 m above sea level (AA)
- Löffelspitze, 3,190 m above sea level (AA)
- Malhamhorn, 3,186 m above sea level (AA)
- Steinkarkogel, 3,180 m above sea level (AA)
- Jagdhausspitze, 3,165 m above sea level (AA)
- Hohe Achsel, 3,161 m above sea level (AA)
- Hohes Kreuz, 3,159 m above sea level (AA)
- Kreuzspitze, 3,155 m above sea level (AA)
- Schliefertürme, 3,142 m above sea level (AA)
- Säulspitze, 3,137 m above sea level (AA)
- Hintere Sonntagsköpfe, 3,136 m above sea level (AA)
- Tredeberspitze, 3,134 m above sea level (AA)
- Hohe Warte, 3,128 m above sea level (AA)
- Rotenmannkopf, 3,127 m above sea level (AA)
- Bachmayrspitze, 3,120 m above sea level (AA)
- Törlbirgkopf, 3,115 m above sea level (AA)
- Lenkspitze, 3,105 m above sea level (AA)
- Glockhaus, 3,103 m above sea level (AA)
- Große Jaidbachspitze, 3,100 m above sea level (AA)
- Schwarzes Hörndl, 3,100 m above sea level (AA)
- Hinterer Sajatkopf, 3,098 m above sea level (AA)
- Törlspitze, 3,092 m above sea level (AA)
- Merbspitze, 3,090 m above sea level (AA)
- Wunwand, 3,090 m above sea level (AA)
- Gamsmutter, 3,089 m above sea level (AA)
- Gastacher Wände, max. 3,087 m above sea level (AA)
- Arventalspitze, 3,083 m above sea level (AA)
- Rotenmannspitze, 3,077 m above sea level (AA)
- Unlaßkarkopf, 3,074 m above sea level (AA)
- Gabelspitze, 3,071 m above sea level (AA)
- Käferfeldeck, 3,070 m above sea level (AA)
- Rauhkopf, 3,070 m above sea level (AA)
- Krimmler Törlkopf, 3,063 m above sea level (AA)
- Habachspitze, 3,062 m above sea level (AA)
- Tulpspitze, 3,054 m above sea level (AA)
- Ahrner Kopf, 3,051 m above sea level (AA)
- Blessachkopf, 3,050 m above sea level (AA)
- Mittereggspitze, 3,044 m above sea level (AA)
- Schernerskopf, 3,033 m above sea level (AA)
- Ogasil(-spitze), 3,032 m above sea level (AA)
- Foiskarkopf, 3,029 m above sea level (AA)
- Vorderkopf, 3,024 m above sea level (AA)
- Kratzenberg, 3,022 m above sea level (AA)
- Wildenkogel, 3,021 m above sea level (AA)
- Südliche Göriacher Röte, 3,020 m above sea level (AA)
- Larmkogel, 3,017 m above sea level (AA)
- Nördliche Göriacher Röte, 3,011 m above sea level (AA)
- Weiglkarkopf, 3,009 m above sea level (AA)
- Ochsenbug, 3,007 m above sea level (AA)
- Essener Eck, 3,006 m above sea level (AA)
- Kemetspitze, 3,004 m above sea level (AA)
- Bretterspitze, 3,001 m above sea level (AA)
- Pillewizer, 3,000 m above sea level (AA)

Panargenkamm:

- Keeseck (Keesegg), 3,173 m above sea level (AA)
- Alplesspitze, 3,149 m above sea level (AA)
- Totenkarspitze, 3,133 m above sea level (AA)
- Panargenspitze, 3,117 m above sea level (AA)
- Seespitze, 3,021 m above sea level (AA)

Lasörling Group:

- Lasörling, 3,098 m above sea level (AA)
- Stampfleskopf, 3,071 m above sea level (AA)
- Rosenspitze, 3,060 m above sea level (AA)
- Großschober, 3,054 m above sea level (AA)
- Reichenberger Spitze, 3,030 m above sea level (AA)
- Finsterkarspitze, 3,029 m above sea level (AA)
- Blindis, 3,000 m above sea level (AA)

== Tourism ==
The Venediger Group is well developed for tourism. In addition to a myriad managed Alpine pastures and restaurants there is also a large number of Alpine Club huts:

- Alte Prager Hut, 2,489 m above sea level (AA)
- Badener Hut, 2,608 m above sea level (AA)
- Bergeralm, 1,845 m above sea level (AA)
- Berger-See Hut, 2,182 m above sea level (AA)
- Berndlalm, 1,500 m above sea level (AA)
- Bonn-Matreier Hut, 2,750 m above sea level (AA)
- Clara Hut, 2,038 m above sea level (AA)
- Defreggerhaus, 2,962 m above sea level (AA)
- Eissee Hut, 2,521 m above sea level (AA)
- Essener-Rostocker Hut, 2,208 m above sea level (AA)
- Innergschlöss Alm, 1,698 m above sea level (AA)
- Johannis Hut, 2,121 m above sea level (AA)
- Kleine-Philipp-Reuter Hut, 2,692 m above sea level (AA)
- Kürsinger Hut, 2,558 m above sea level (AA)
- Lenkjöchl Hut, 2,603 m above sea level (AA)
- Matreier Tauernhaus, 1,512 m above sea level (AA)
- Moa Alm, 1,410 m above sea level (AA)
- New Fürther Hut, 2,201 m above sea level (AA)
- New Prager Hut, 2,796 m above sea level (AA)
- New Thüringer Hut, 2,240 m above sea level (AA)
- Nilljoch Hut, 1,990 m above sea level (AA)
- Postalm, 1,700 m above sea level (AA)
- New Reichenberger Hut, 2,586 m above sea level (AA)
- New Sajat Hut, 2,600 m above sea level (AA)
- Venedigerhaus, 1,700 m above sea level (AA)
- Warnsdorfer Hut, 2,336 m above sea level (AA)
- Wetterkreuz Hut, 2,106 m above sea level (AA)
- Zupalsee Hut, 2,350 m above sea level (AA)

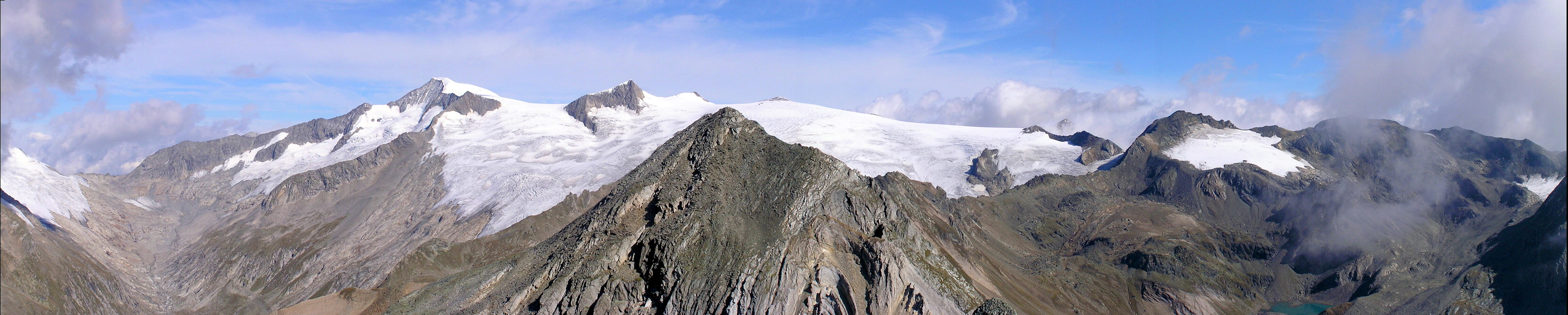
The central Venediger Group from the Kreuzspitze (3,164 m) to the south
