= Hohes Aderl =

Mountain in Austria

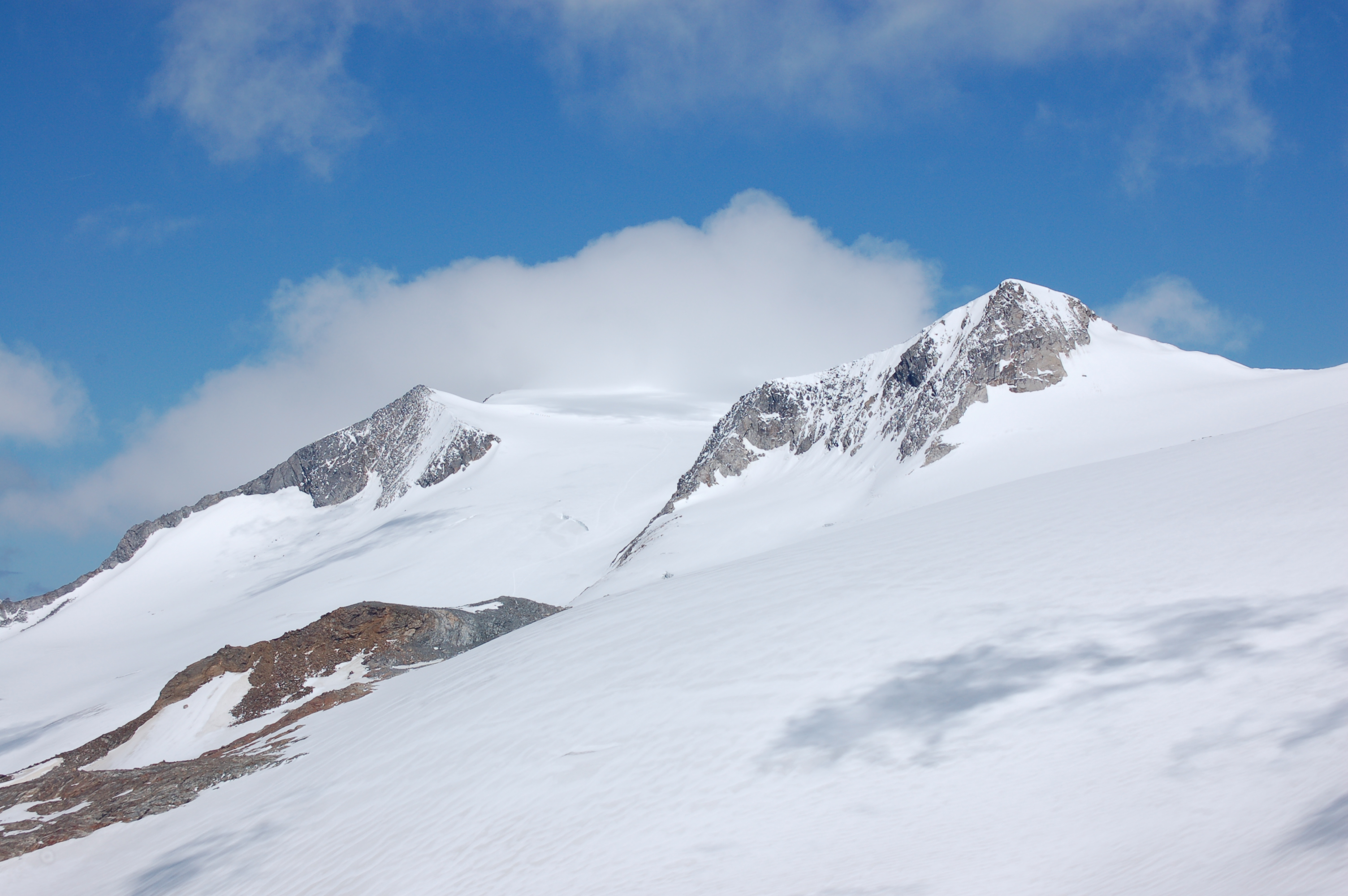
- Hohes Aderl, Rainertörl and Rainerhorn seen from the southwest (Weißspitze)

Highest point
- Elevation: 3,506 m (11,503 ft)
- Coordinates: 47°6′7″N 12°21′1″E

Geography
- Location within Tyrol, Austria Location within Austria
- Location: East Tyrol
- Country: Austria
- Parent range: Venediger Group

Climbing
- Normal route: from Rainertörl (not difficult)

The Hohe Aderl is a 3,506 metres (11,503 ft) high mountain peak of the Venediger Group in East Tyrol.

== Location ==
The Hohes Aderl is the fourth highest mountain in the Venediger Group. It has an elevation of 3,506 metres (11,503 ft) and prominence of 39 metres (128 ft). Its isolation from its nearest higher neighbor, Großvenediger, is 848 metres (2,782 ft). It drains via the Isel and Drava into the Danube.

The Hohe Aderl is located in the center of the Venediger Group in the crest of the Hohen Gletscherdachs (High Glacier Roof) just south of the border between the federal state of Salzburg and East Tyrol, in the north of Prägraten am Großvenediger municipality. Located in the heart of the Hohe Tauern National Park, the Hohe Aderl is located on the southern ridge of the Großvenediger, which rises to 3,657 metres (11,998 ft) above sea level. Since the Hohe Aderl is only slightly higher than the Hohes-Aderl-Scharte, which is 3,480 metres (11,420 ft) above sea level, the summit is not rated as an independent peak.

To the south, the southern ridge of the Großvenediger continues to the Hohe Ader (3225 m above sea level), which ends in the Schwarzer Ader (2988 m above sea level). In the east is the Rainertörl (3406 m above sea level), where the Schlatenkees in the north meets the Inner Mullwitzkees in the south. The Rainertörl separates the Hohe Aderl from the Rainerhorn (3559 m above sea level). In the west there is another glacier, the Dorferkees. The closest refuges are the Neue Prager Hütte in the northeast, the Kürsingerhütte in the northwest, the Badener Hütte in the southwest and Defreggerhaus and Eisseehütte in the south.

== Climbing ==
The Hohes Aderl was first climbed in 1854 by H. v. Acken with assistants. The first winter ascent was achieved by R. Spannagel with J. Unterwurzacher and J. Ensmann on 27 May 1892.

The normal route to the Hohe Aderl starts in the Rainertörl, which can be reached, for example, via the Großvenediger south ascent from the Defreggerhaus via the Innere Mullwitzkees. The ascent from Rainertörl takes place on a moderately inclined snow slope to the summit (not difficult). An alternative is to climb the southwest ridge from the Aderschartl.

== Sources ==
- "Hohes Aderl, Austria", Peakbagger
- "Hohes Aderl", PeakVisor
- Peterka, Hubert; End, Willi (1982), Venedigergruppe: e. Führer für Täler, Hütten u. Berge, Bergverlag Rother, ISBN 9783763312429
