= Malhamspitzen =

Mountain in East Tyrol, Austria

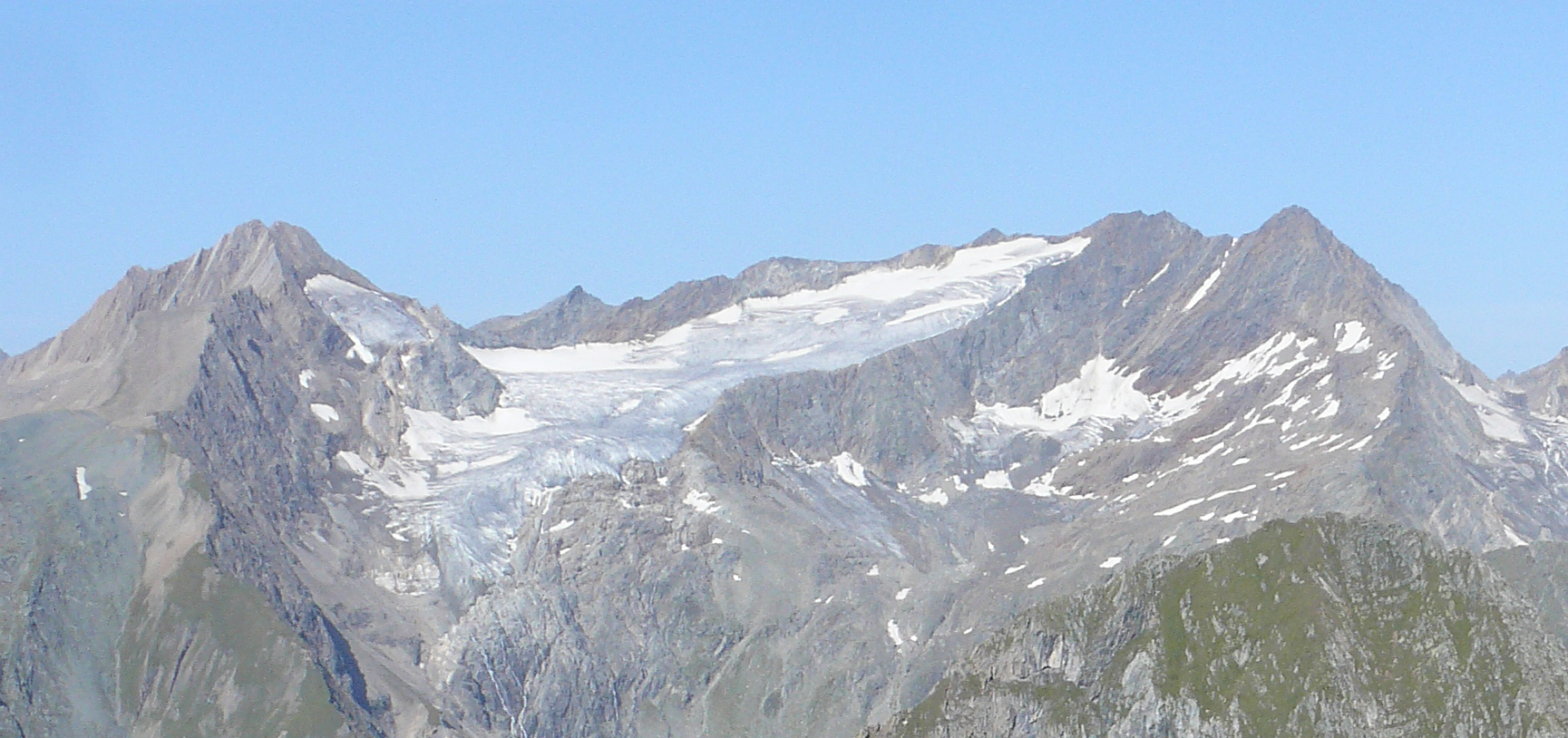
- The Quirl (left) and all the Malhamspitze peaks seen from the Sajatscharte col to the east (2012).

Highest point
- Elevation: 3,368 m (AA) (11,050 ft)
- Prominence: 3,368-3,047 m ↓ Reggentörl
- Isolation: 1.7 km → Hintere Gubachspitze
- Listing: Alpine mountains above 3000 m
- Coordinates: 47°02′58″N 12°15′33″E

Geography
- Location within Austria
- Location: Tyrol, Austria
- Parent range: Venediger Group

Climbing
- First ascent: 12 July 1873 by Victor Hecht and Johann Außerhofer up the west flank
- Normal route: Firn and ice tour across the west flank from Reggentörl

The Malhamspitzen (originally called the Malchamspitze by Carl Sonklar) are the four peaks of a mighty massif on the Maurerkamm, an Alpine mountain chain in the Venediger Group in Austria's High Tauern National Park. They rise south of the Reggentörl (3,047 m above sea level (AA)) and are only separated from one another by small cols. The literature distinguishes them as follows:

- Nördliche Malhamspitze, north top (3,368 m (AA)),
- Mittlere Malhamspitze, middle top (3,318 m above sea level (AA)),
- Südliche Malhamspitze, south top (3,326 m above sea level (AA)),
- Südlichste Malhamspitze, southernmost top (3,255 m above sea level (AA), 47.040739°N 12.258252°E)

The Malhamhorn (3,186 m above sea level (AA)) also belongs to the group.

== Location and area ==
The Malhamspitzen are surrounded by glaciers. To the west of the north-south crest of the Malhamspitzen lies the Gubachkees, which drains into the River Isel; to the east, feeding the Maurerbach, are the Südliche Malhamkees (also: Böses Wandkees) and the lower-lying Nördliche Malhamkees which has melted drastically in recent years.

== Ascent ==
The four peaks were first climbed on 12 July 1873 by Prague Alpinist, Victor Hecht, and mountain guide, Johann Außerhofer along the west side from the Clara Hut and over the Umbalgletscher glacier. At that time Hecht only distinguished four summits.

The route runs over the southern part of the Simonykees glacier from the Essener-Rostocker Hut and over the Reggentörl towards the west and continues over the expansive Umbalkees, then follows the Isel stream to the Clara Hut.

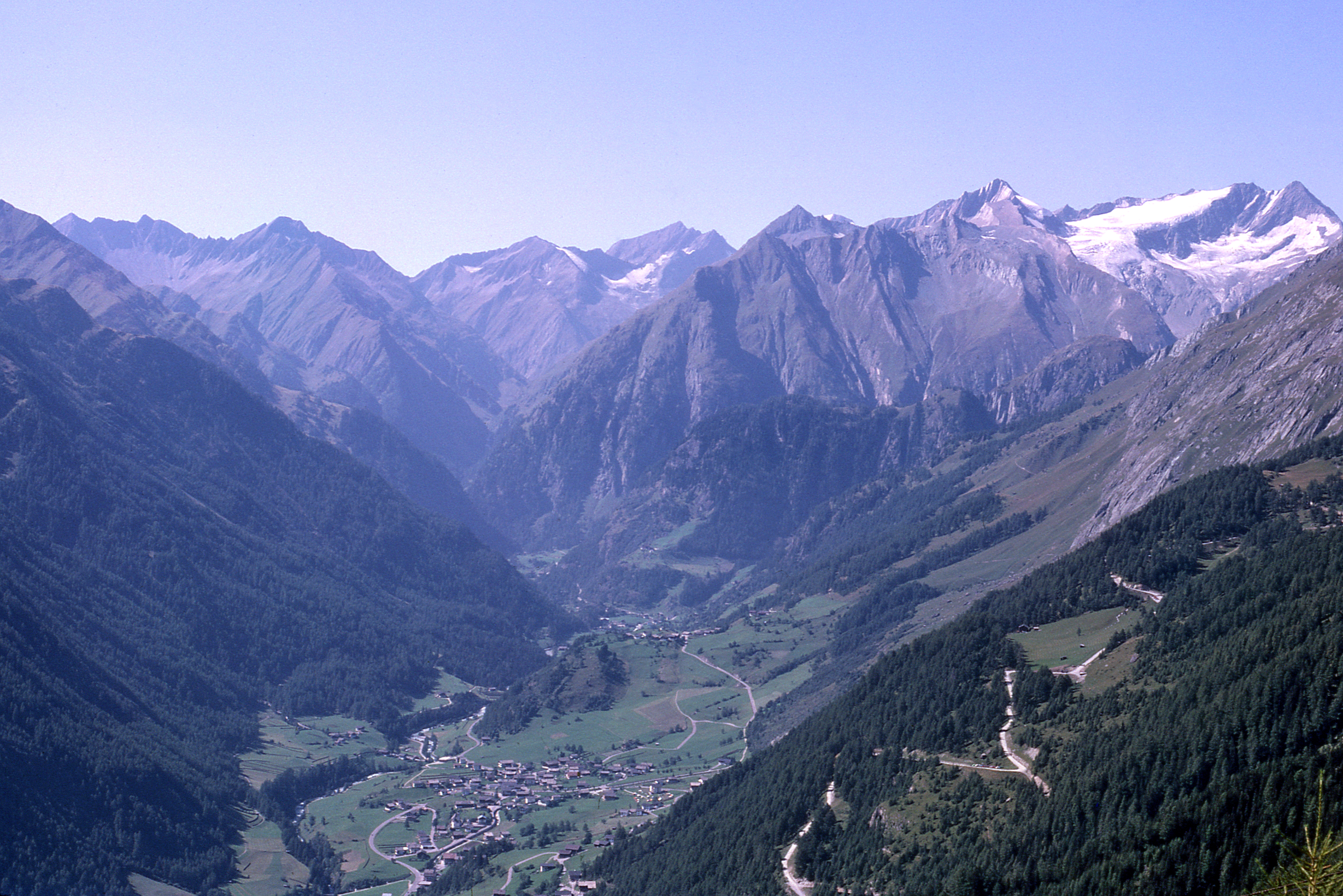
The Malhamspitzen from the Nilljoch Hut (1982)

== Literature and maps ==
- Willi End: Alpine Club Guide Venedigergruppe, Bergverlag Rother, Munich, 2006, ISBN 3-7633-1242-0.
- Alpine Club map 1:25,000 series, Sheet 36, Venedigergruppe, ISBN 3-928777-49-1.
