= Dreiherrnspitze =

Mountain in Italy

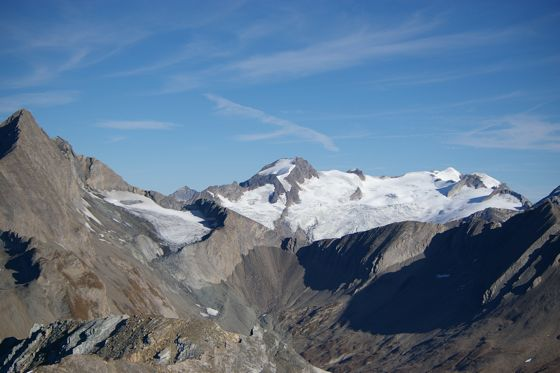
- Summit from the south

Highest point
- Elevation: 3,499 m (11,480 ft)
- Prominence: 559
- Listing: Alpine mountains above 3000 m
- Coordinates: 47°4′12″N 12°14′22″E

Geography
- Location: Salzburg, Tyrol, both Austria; South Tyrol, Italy
- Parent range: Hohe Tauern

Climbing
- First ascent: 2 November 1866 by Balthasar Ploner, M. Dorer and I. Feldner

The Dreiherrnspitze (Italian: Picco dei Tre Signori), at 3,499 m (11,480 ft) above mean sea level, is a mountain on the tripoint between the Austrian states of Salzburg and Tyrol (i.e. East Tyrol), and South Tyrol in Italy. It is part of the Venediger Group in the Hohe Tauern range of the Central Eastern Alps and the Alpine divide.

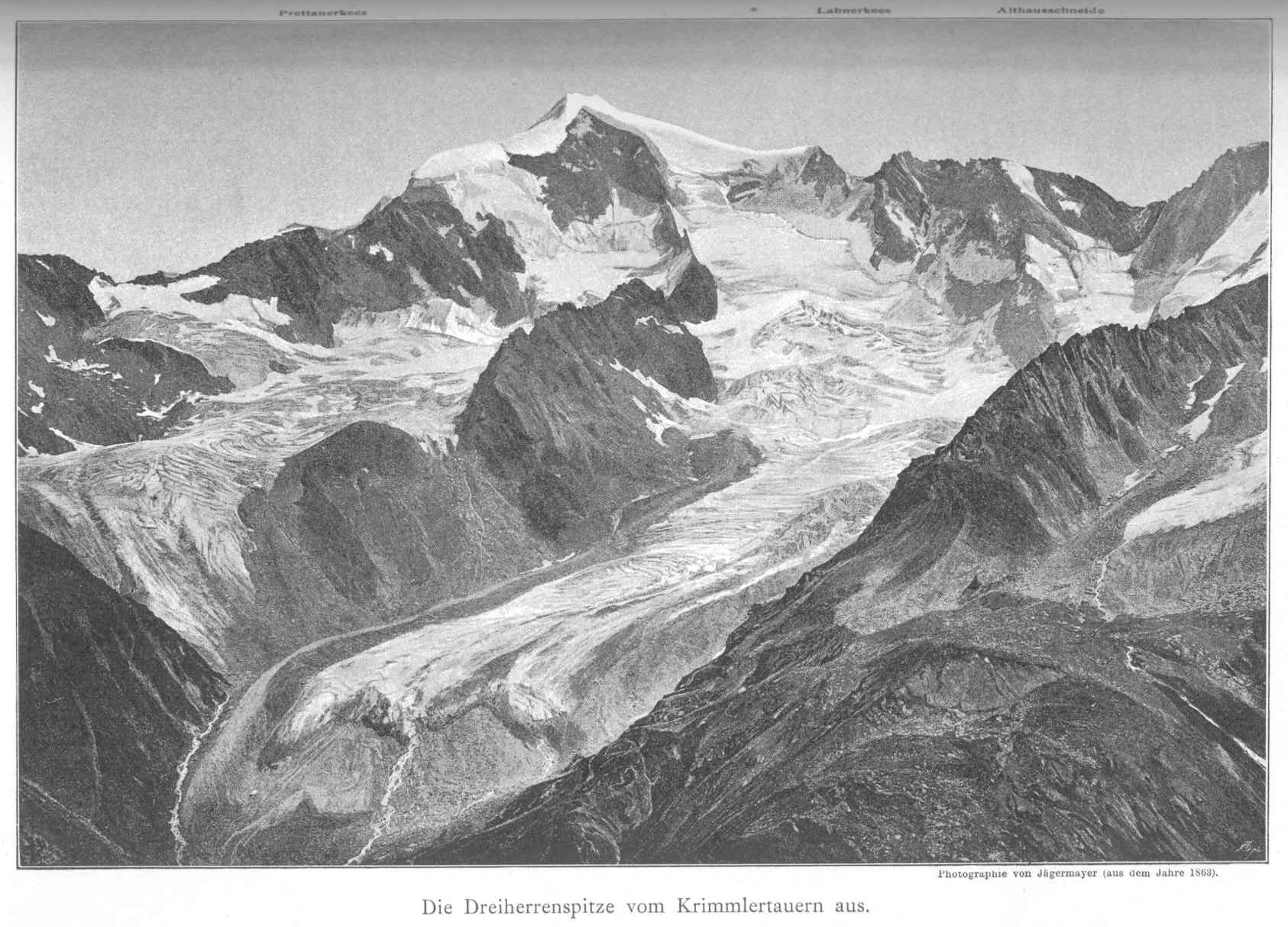
Dreiherrnspitze about 1890, with Lahner glacier

The name is derived from the fact, that upon the 1271 partition within the Tyrolean Meinhardiner dynasty, the territories of the Counts of Tyrol and the East Tyrolean estates of the Counts of Görz bordered on the lands of the Archbishops of Salzburg at the peak.

The summit is characterised by its steep rock faces to the northeast, surrounded by numerous glaciers. A first ascent was documented in 1866.

== Location ==
The mountain is surrounded by glaciers. To the north, at the foot of the Northeast Face, is the heavily crevassed Krimmler Kees with its jagged icefalls. To the east and south lies the Umbalkees, which climbs to a height of 3,400 metres; to the west is the Lahner Kees which extends far into the summit region. Neighbouring peaks include the Umbalköpfl, 600 metres away on the course of the prominent East Arête at 3,426 m and, a further 1,000 metres to the east, the 3,481-metre-high Western Simonyspitze, which is named after Austrian alpine researcher and geographer, Friedrich Simony. On the course of the Roßhufkamm ridge to the southwest and about 2,200 metres away is the Hoher Roßhuf at 3,199 m. Along the northwestern ridge of the main chain of the Tauern (the Tauernhauptkamm) lies the Grasleitenkopf (2,954 m). The nearest important settlements are the village of Kasern, 9 kilometres away to the southwest (as the crow flies) in the South Tyrolean valley of Ahrntal. Also 9 km distant, albeit to the southeast, is the Austrian village of Hinterbichl near Prägraten in the Virgental valley.
