= Großer Geiger =

Mountain in the Austrian Central Alps

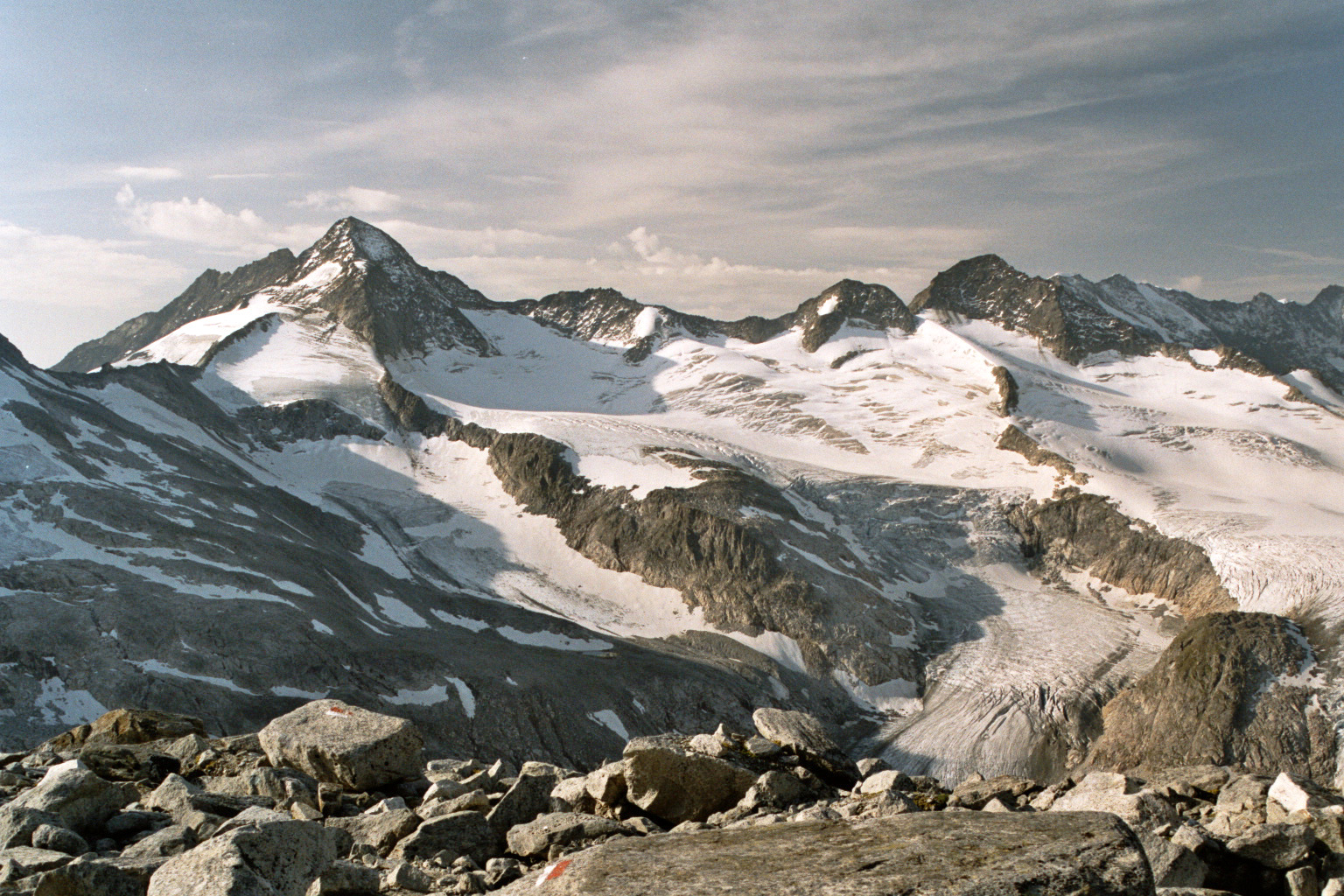
- The Großer Geiger (left) from the north, seen from the Keeskogel

Highest point
- Elevation: 3,360 m (AA) (11,020 ft)
- Prominence: 290 m ↓ Col to the Kleiner Maurerkeeskopf
- Isolation: 2.8 km → Großvenediger
- Listing: Alpine mountains above 3000 m
- Coordinates: 47°05′37″N 12°18′29″E

Geography
- Location within Austria
- Location: Salzburg and Tyrol, Austria
- Parent range: Venediger Group

Geology
- Rock type: Central gneiss of the Tauern window

Climbing
- First ascent: 20 August 1871 by Richard Issler, guided by Michael Groder
- Normal route: Southwest flank

The Großer Geiger, formerly also called the Obersulzbacher Venediger and Heiliggeistkogel, is a mountain, 3,360 m (AA), in the Venediger Group in the main chain of the Central Tauern (Mittlerer Tauernhauptkamm). This chain lies in the High Tauern, part of the Austrian Central Alps on the border between the Austrian states of Tyrol in the south and Salzburg in the north.

The mountain was given its present name in 1855 by the Austrian chemist and cartographer, Franz Keil. Because of its isolated situation the Großer Geiger has a significant dominance. With its distinctive, symmetric, pyramidal shape and its mighty northwest face which rises 350 metres above the Obersulzbachkees glacier at a gradient of 50°, it is the most prominent landmark in the entire Upper Sulzbach valley. Arêtes radiate from the summit in all four directions of the compass. The mountain is easy to reach and is thus a popular touring and climbing destination. It was first climbed on 20 August 1871 by the Alpinist, Richard Issler, and mountain guide, Michael Groder from the Johannis Hut to the south.

== Surrounding area ==
The Großer Geiger is surrounded by glaciers, which reach a height of over 3,200 metres in places. To the north lies the Obersulzbachkees, to the east the Dorferkees, to the south and west is the Maurerkees. Its nearest peak is the Großvenediger, at 3,667 metres the highest mountain of the group, which lies to the northeast on the main chain of the Tauern, separated by the mountain pass of Obersulzbachtörl at a height of 2,921 metres. The only other significant neighbouring peaks are the three Maurerkeesköpfe (Kleiner- 3,205 m, Hinterer- 3,313 m and Mittlerer Maurerkeeskopf at 3,281 m) on the line of the western arête. The nearest sizeable settlement is the Tyrolean village of Hinterbichl near Prägraten 10 kilometres away as the crow flies in the Virgental valley. Sulzau in Salzburg's Pinzgau valley is 17 km away to the north.

== Bases and ascents ==
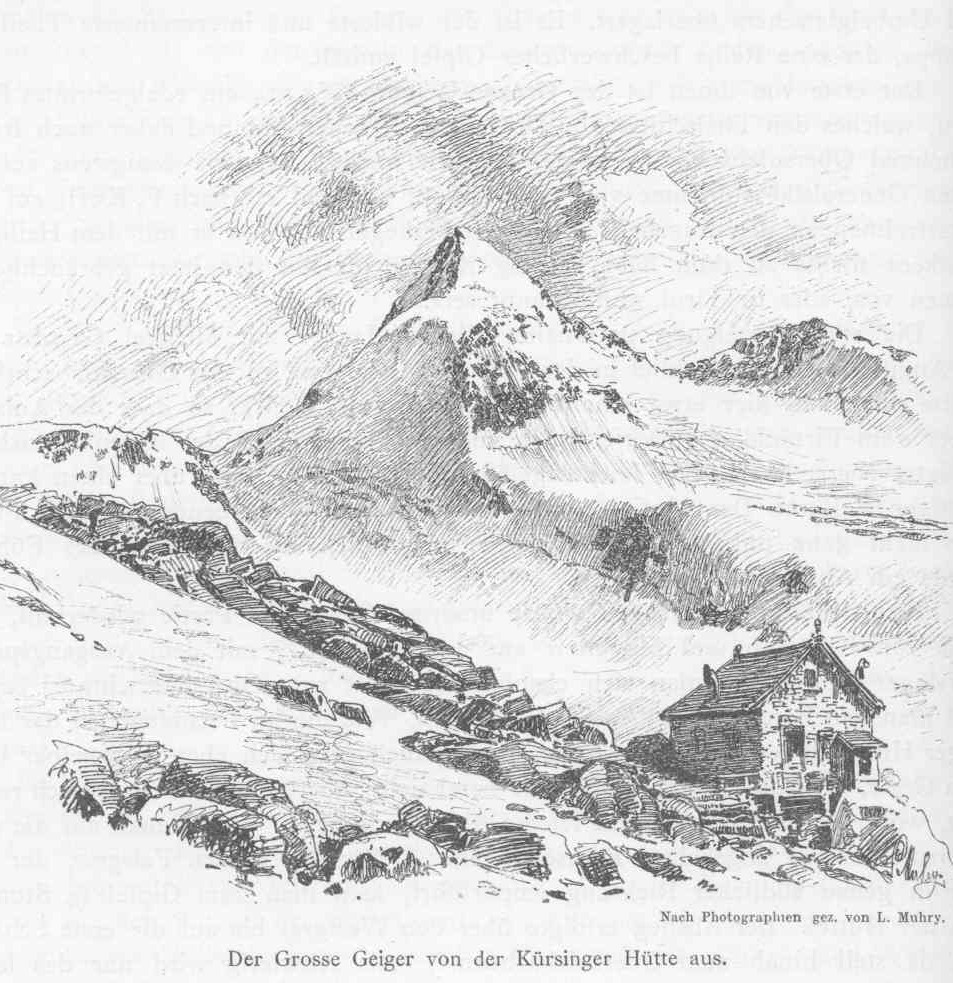
The Großer Geiger from the north. In the foreground is the original Kürsinger Hut. 19th century photograph

The Großer Geiger can only be climbed by crossing glaciers as part of a high mountain tour. The route taken by the first climbers in 1871 ran from the south up to the summit. Their base was the Johannis Hut lying at 2,121 metres in the valley of the Upper Dorfertal. Their route initially followed the Dorferbach upstream to the middle of the very heavily crevassed Dorferkees at a height of about 2,700 metres and then swung west over firn at a gradient of 30° to the so-called Ostsporn (East Spur). They scaled this relatively difficult rock climbing route, today classed as UIAA climbing grade II, to the summit. This entailed negotiating some critical sections which almost led to a fall. The present normal route to the Großer Geiger runs either from the Essener-Rostocker Hut at 2,208 metres, heading in a northerly direction, or from the Kürsinger Hut (2,547 m) in a southerly direction up to the western arête (Geigerschartl col, 3,142 m) of the Geiger and then across its southwestern flank climbing over the firn to the summit cross. According to the literature this takes about 3½ to 4 hours from one of the huts. More demanding climbing routes, of UIAA grades III to IV, lead up the northwest face and along its flanking arêtes, some as combined tours (ice and rock).

== Literature and maps ==
- Willi End: Alpine Club Guide Venedigergruppe, Munich, 2006, ISBN 3-7633-1242-0
- Eduard Richter: Erschliessung der Ostalpen, Vol. III, Verlag des Deutschen und Oesterreichischen Alpenvereins, Berlin, 1894
- Alpine Club map 1:25,000 series, Sheet 36, Venedigergruppe
