= Krimmler Ache =

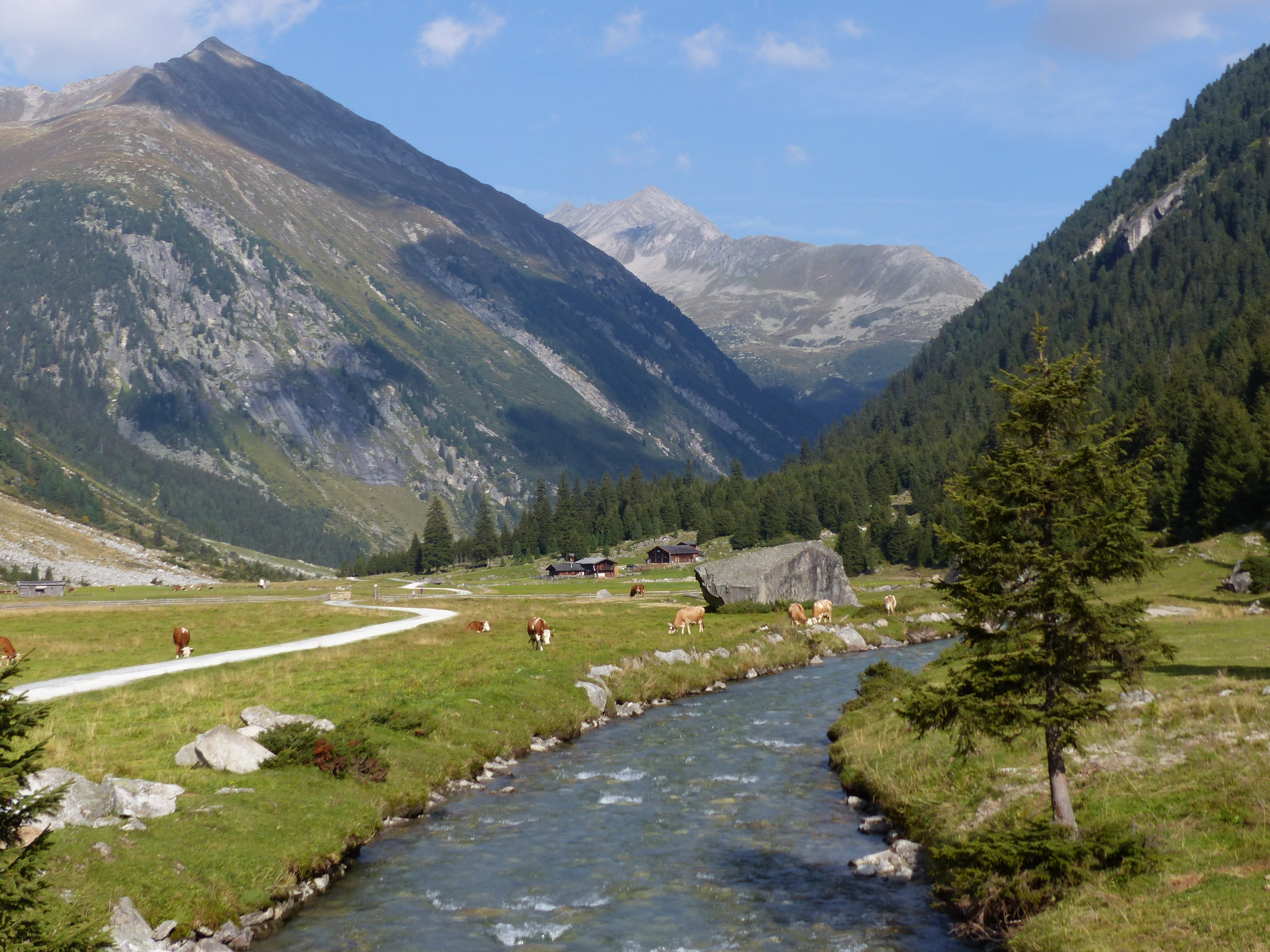
- The Krimmler Ache at the Jaidbachalm

Location
- Country: Austria
- State: Salzburg

Physical characteristics
- Source
  - location: At the Krimmler Törl
  - coordinates: 47°06′01″N 12°16′20″E
  - elevation: ca. 2,100 m (AA)
- Mouth
  - location: At Vorderkrimml into the Salzach
  - coordinates: 47°14′13″N 12°11′54″E
  - elevation: ca. 905 m (AA)

Basin features
- Progression: Salzach→ Inn→ Danube→ Black Sea
- Landmarks: Villages: Krimml
- Tributaries
  - right: Rainbach, Windbach

The Krimmler Ache is a river in the Pinzgau region of the Austrian state of Salzburg, a right tributary of the Salzach at Vorderkrimml, Wald im Pinzgau. The Krimmler Ache is fed by the Krimml glacier, making the river a glacial stream. The Krimmler Ache is the source of the Krimml Waterfalls, one of Austria's largest tourist destinations.

Its valley (the Krimmler Achental) forms the boundary between the Zillertal Alps in the west and the Venediger Group in the east, which belong to the High Tauern. The valley begins above the village of Krimml at the Krimml Waterfalls and runs up to its head at the Krimmlerkees on the mountain of Dreiherrenspitze (3,499 m (AA)). The Krimmler Ache itself rises at a height of about 2,500 metres (8,200 ft) at the Krimmler Törl to the valley Obersulzbachtal at the east.

In the upper east corner of the valley of the Krimmler Ache there is the alpine hut Warnsdorfer Hütte and in the central section the Krimmler Tauernhaus. The Tauernhaus has been mentioned as a shelter for travelers as early as 1389.
