= Rötspitze =

Mountain in Italy

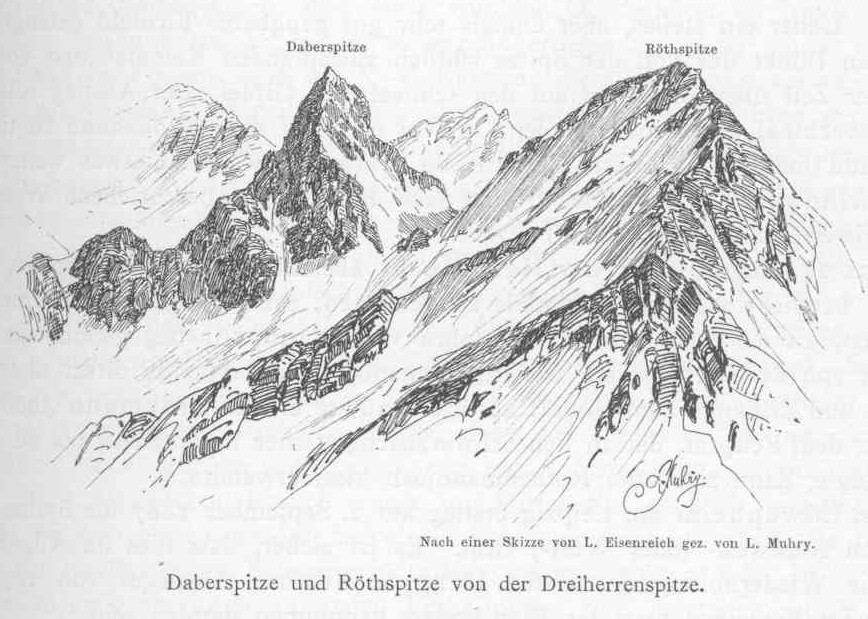

Highest point
- Elevation: 3,495 m (11,467 ft)
- Prominence: 653
- Listing: Alpine mountains above 3000 m
- Coordinates: 47°1′38″N 12°12′16″E

Geography
- Location: Austria; Italy
- Parent range: Hohe Tauern

Climbing
- First ascent: 22 August 1854

The Rötspitze (Italian: Pizzo Rosso; German: Rötspitze) is a mountain in the Hohe Tauern on the border between Tyrol, Austria, and South Tyrol, Italy.
