= Rainerhorn =

Mountain in the Venediger Group in East Tyrol

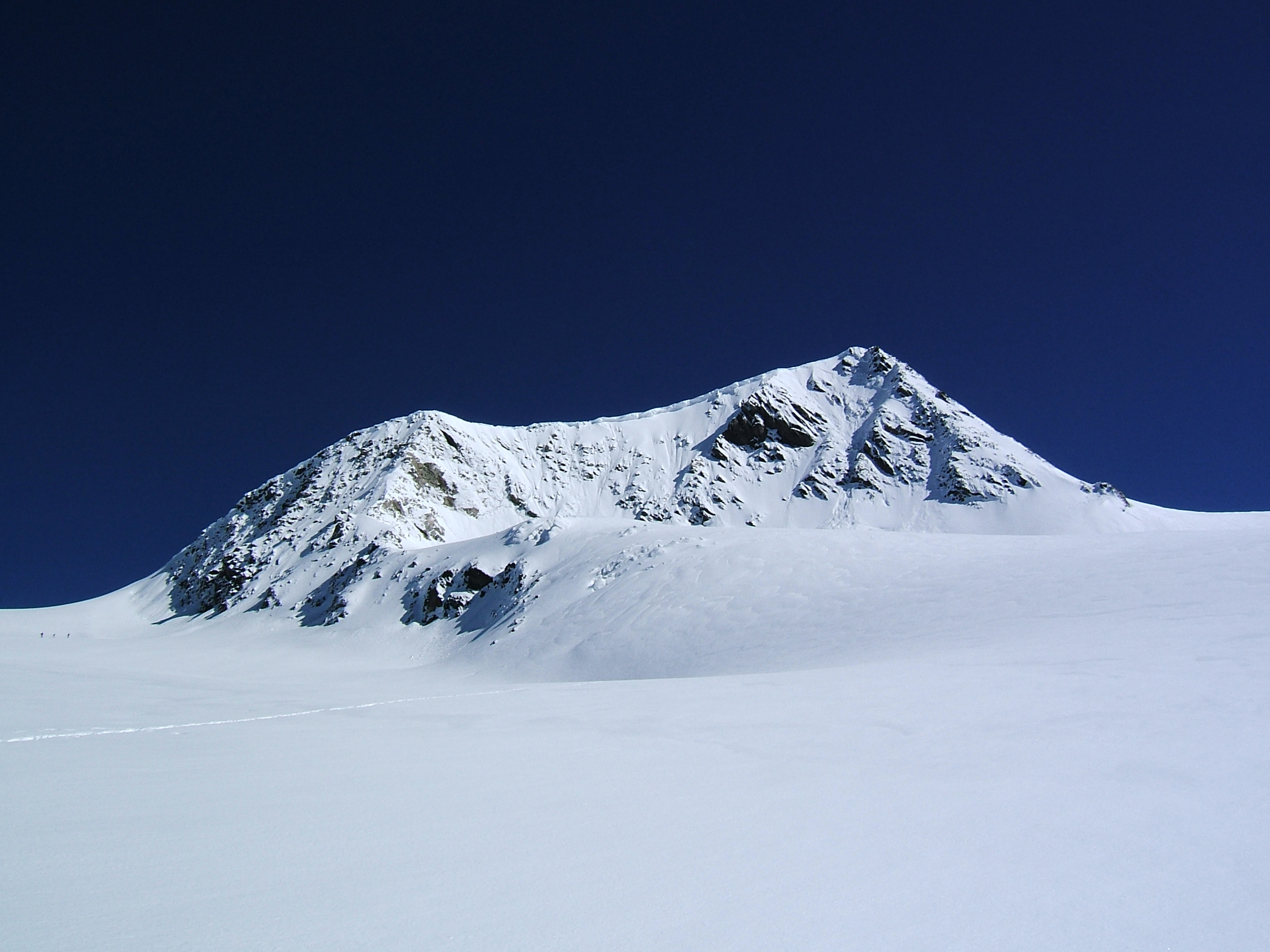
- Summit from the south

Highest point
- Elevation: 3,559 m (11,677 ft)
- Coordinates: 47°6′7″N 12°21′47″E

Geography
- Location within Austria
- Location: Tyrol, Austria
- Parent range: Hohe Tauern

Climbing
- First ascent: 10 August 1859 by Franz Keil and Ignaz Wagl

The Rainerhorn (German: [ˈʁaɪnɐˌhɔɐ̯n]) is a mountain in the Venediger Group. It is 3,559 m (11,677 ft) high.
