= Isel (river) =

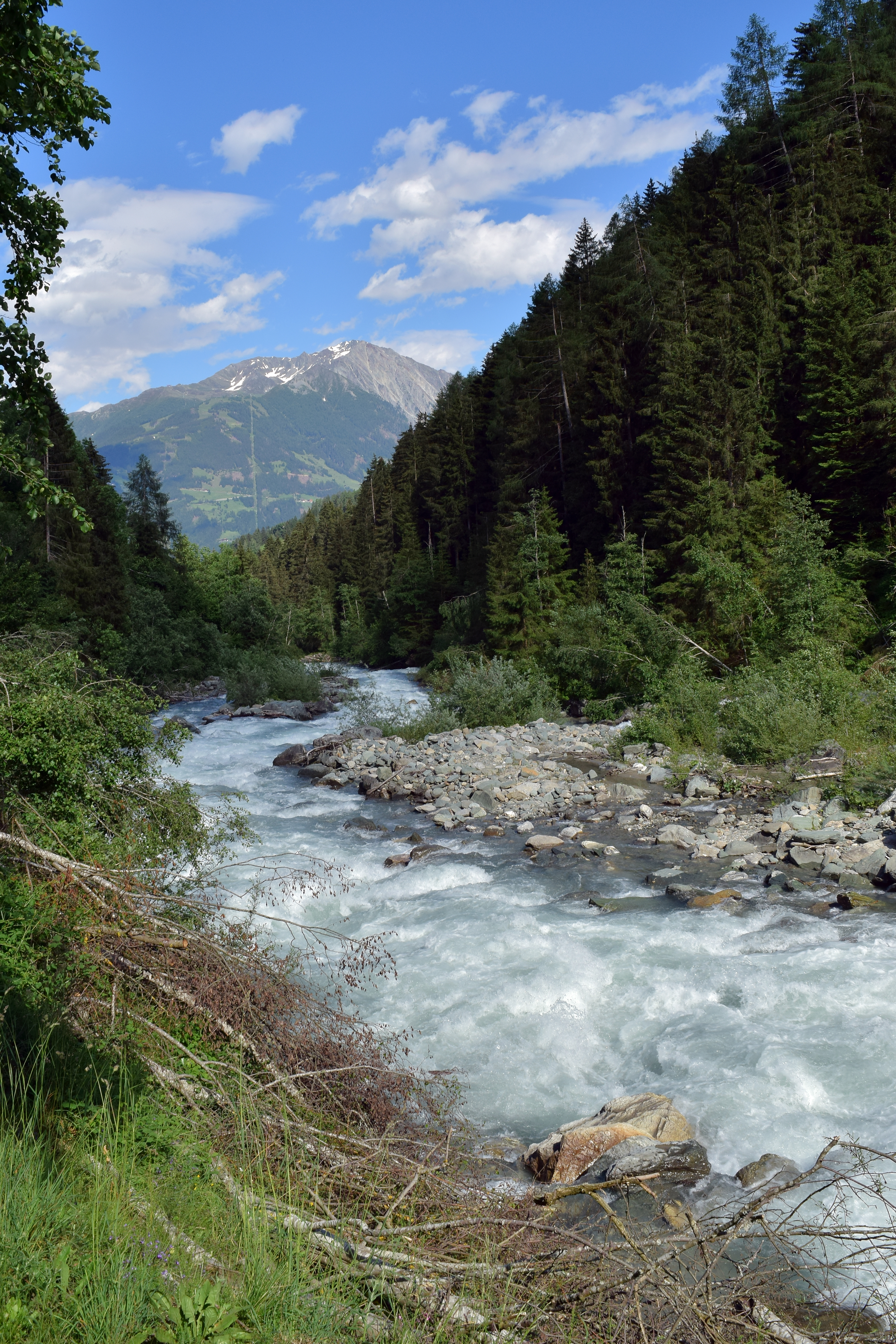
- The river Isel in Virgen, East Tyrol. The Klaunzer Berg is visible in the background

- Elevation profile and catchment area of the Isel in East Tyrol

- Location within Austria

Location
- Country: Austria
- State: East Tyrol

Physical characteristics
- Source
  - coordinates: 47°2′42″N 12°13′42″E
  - elevation: 2,400 metres (7,900 ft)
- Mouth: Drava
  - location: Lienz
  - coordinates: 46°49′44″N 12°46′33″E
  - elevation: 673 metres (2,208 ft)
- Length: 57.3 kilometres (35.6 mi)
- Basin size: 1,200.86 square kilometres (463.65 sq mi)
- Discharge
  - location: Drava
  - average: 39 cubic metres per second (1,400 cu ft/s)

Basin features
- River system: Danube
- Tributaries
  - left: Maurerbach, Mullitzbach, Tauernbach, Kalserbach
  - right: Lasnitzenbach, Steinkasbach, Schwarzach, Michelbach

The Isel (German pronunciation: [ˈiːzl̩]) is a 57.3 kilometres (35.6 mi) glacier-fed river in East Tyrol, Austria. The river flow varies with daily and seasonal temperature changes, and the riverbed is constantly shifting, creating a unique environment. The river's course runs along a geological fault running from NW to SE. It held a glacier during the last ice age, which has left boulders and gravel along the valley. There have been various proposals to dam and divert the water for use in generating hydroelectricity which have been opposed by environmentalists. Since 2015 the river has been designated a Natura 2000 site, which offers some protection. There is a hiking trail along the river, and it is known for excellent whitewater rafting conditions.

== Course ==
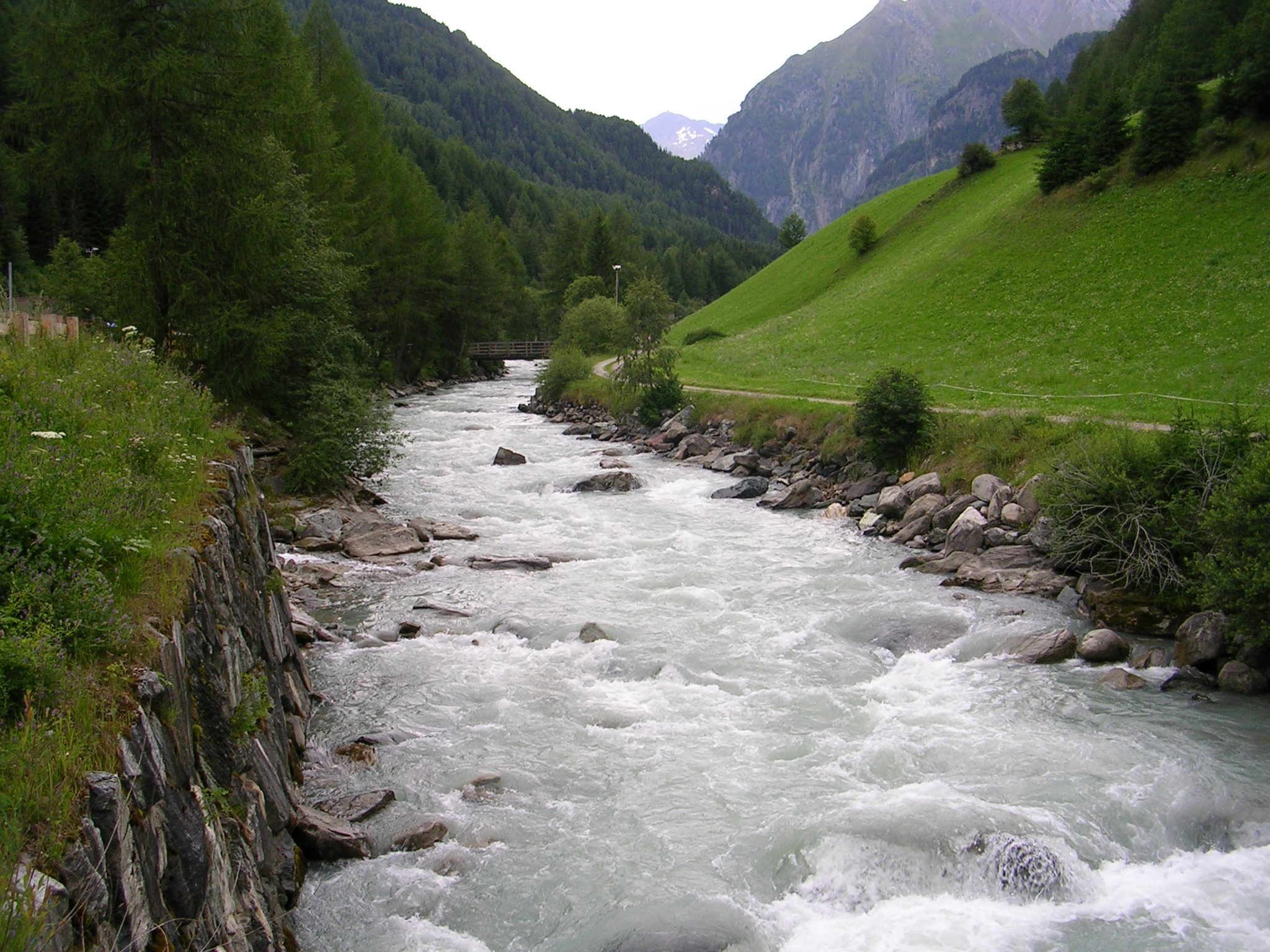
Isel near Prägraten am Großvenediger

The Isel river flows from the Umbalkees glacier in the Hohe Tauern National Park near the summit of Rötspitze mountain. It is a left tributary of the Drava (Drau). The catchment areas of the Isel and Drava together cover almost all of East Tyrol. The catchment area of the Isel is about 1,200 square kilometres (460 sq mi). At the estuary where the Isel enters the Drau the mean water flow is about 39 cubic metres per second (1,400 cu ft/s). A flood event of about 770 cubic metres per second (27,000 cu ft/s) is expected to occur once in 100 years.

The Isel flows through a deeply incised valley with several gorges (Iselschlucht) in which it has created several waterfalls. At present there are no dams or diversions along its course. The Tauernbach tributary joins the Isel at Matrei. Other important tributaries are the Schwarzach and the Kalserbach. Below Matrei the valley widens along the lower stretch to where the river meets the Drau at Lienz.

The river banks flood daily and seasonally, and the riverbed constantly shifts. This provides a unique environment for endangered plants such as the German tamarisk (Myricaria germanica). There are eight artificially widened basins in the Isel valley, designed to contain the bed load, which reduce the risk of flooding. These require regular maintenance, which must be adapted to conform with the Natura 2000 designation.

== Geology ==
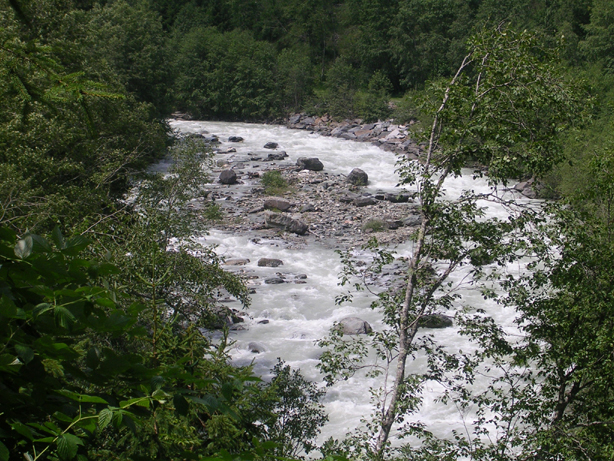
The Isel near Mitteldorf (Virgen)

The Isel fault trends NW-SE and runs along the Isel Valley. It is related to the lateral extrusion about 17 million years ago that exposed the Hohe Tauern window. The Isel fault cuts the E-W trending Defereggen–Anthois–Vals fault.

There are Quaternary sediments in the Isel Valley, mostly till from the Last Glacial Maximum (LGM) between 23,000 and 19,000 years ago. At that time the valley was filled with an ice stream with its surface about 2,300 metres (7,500 ft) above sea level. The valley from elevations of about 1,700 metres (5,600 ft) down to the valley floor near the Daberbach and Gossenbach tributaries at 720 metres (2,360 ft) often holds coarse-grained, poorly sorted and unconsolidated gravel. These deposits seem to be kame terraces formed by streams of meltwater as the ice stream collapsed after the LGM. By 18,000 years ago the lower Isel valley at Ainet was probably free of ice. A series of terminal moraines were left as the local glaciers retreated during the Late Glacial Interstadial.

== Conservation struggle ==
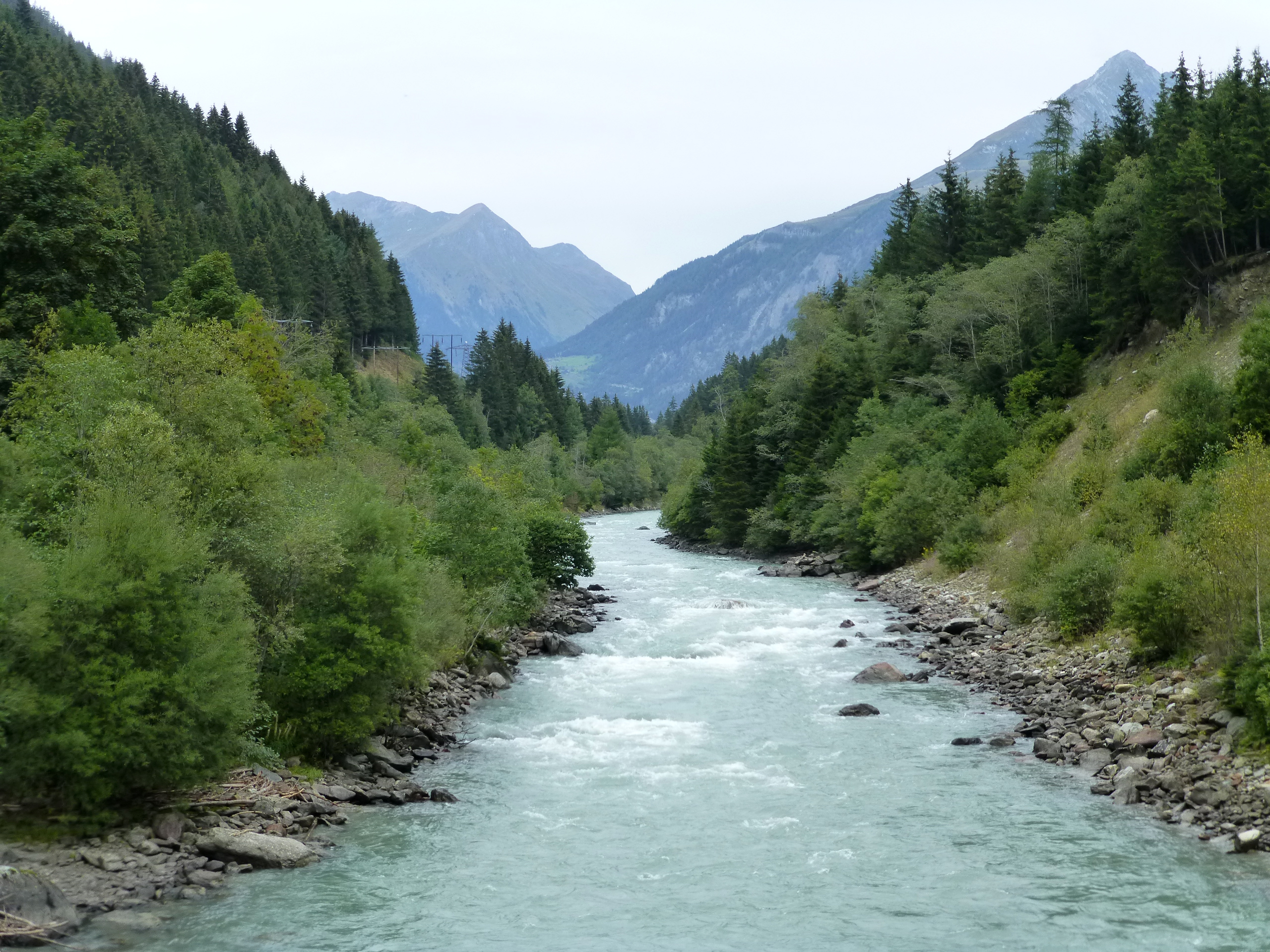
South of Matrei

Planning began in 1971 to create a large reservoir in East Tirol for hydroelectric power generation. All the glacier streams of the region would be diverted into the reservoir. Wolfgang Retter founded the "Association for the Protection of the Recreational Landscape in East Tirol" to fight the plan. The power plant project was cancelled in 1989. In 1998 the Austrian Ministry of Agriculture and Environment and WWF Austria designated the most valuable 74 rivers in Austria as "river sanctuaries". The Ministry and WWF jointly committed to protect the rivers.

On 25 February 2011 a joint meeting of the local councils of Virgen and Prägraten saw a presentation by the Innsbruck company "Infra Project Development GmbH". The company proposed to dam the upper Isel above Hinterbichl in Prägraten and then lead it through a 12 kilometres (7.5 mi) tunnel to a power house in Unterpellach in Mitteldorf / Virgen. The municipalities would pay an estimated seven million euros for construction, then would receive 400,000 euros revenue each year. The meeting was supposed to be private, but details leaked out almost immediately. In November 2011 the municipal council in Matrei was shown a proposal to build a hydropower plant in Huben using water diverted from the Isel, with estimated cost of 55 million euros.

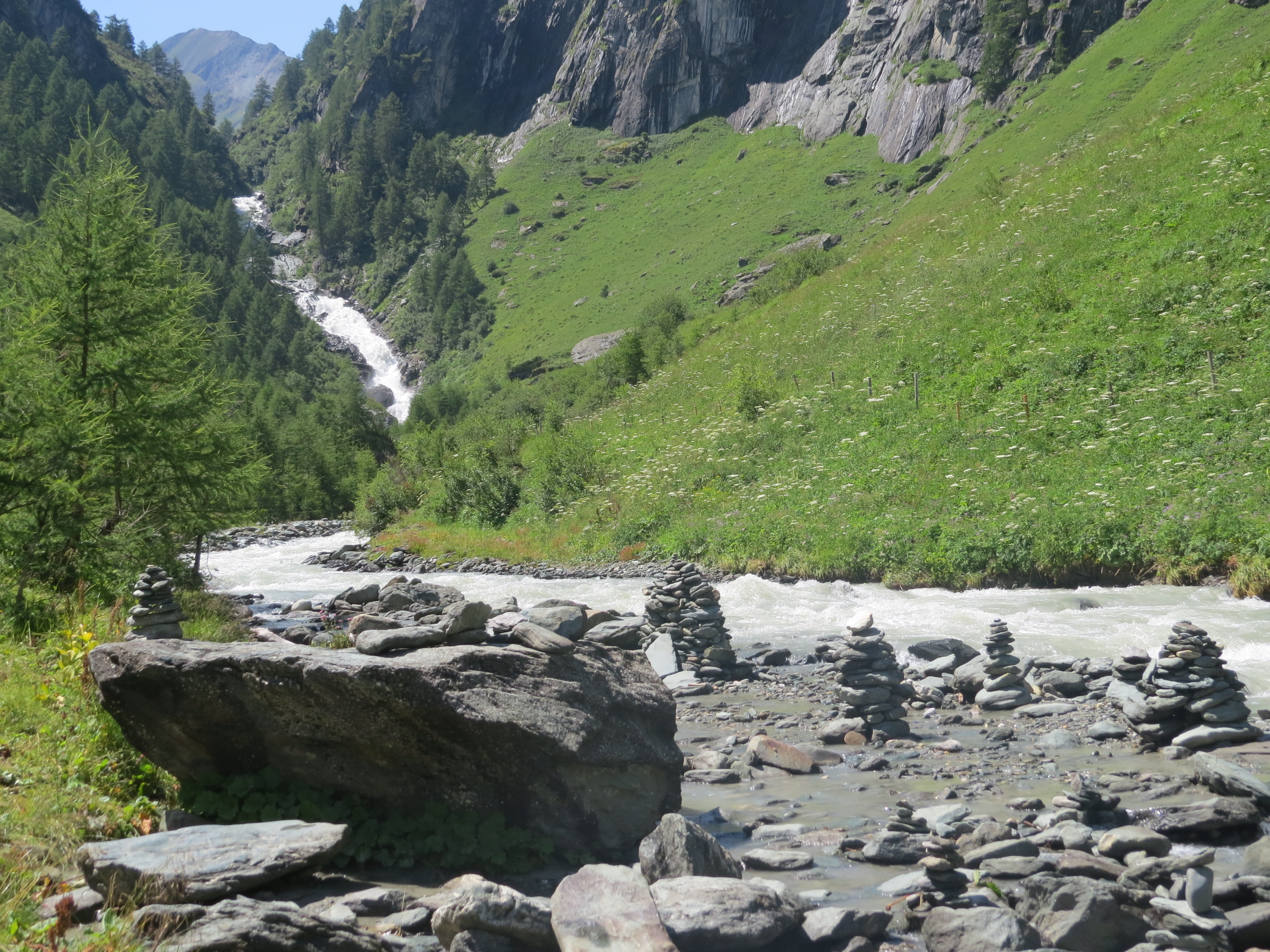
In Virgental

In June 2012 a referendum was held in the Virgental asking "Should the community participate in the planning, construction and operation of an environmentally friendly power plant on the upper Isel?". Voter turnout was high, with 73.9% in Virgen and 79.4% in Prägraten. About 60% or respondents answered "yes" in Prägraten and 72% answered "yes" in Virgen. In September 2012 WWF declared that the Isel was a "National River sanctuary" due to renewed concerns about plans for large power plants in the Isel basin. The proposed project in Virgental would affect 15 kilometres (9.3 mi) of the river and generate 130 GWH of electricity.

In June 2015 the Tyrolean provincial government decided to nominate almost the entire Isel and almost all its tributaries as a Natura 2000 area. This would cover the entire course of the river from the Umbal Falls to the Lienz city limits, and the upper reaches of the Schwarzach and the Kalser Bach. The Natura 2000 zoning would apply to the river only. It would not include cycle paths, roads and sports fields, and landowners would not be displaced. It was not clear that a power plant would be ruled out as long as the habitat was preserved.

== Rafting ==
The river provides good conditions for rafting, with class III and IV rapids. The best conditions are between May and September. The Dolomitenmann extreme sports relay race includes a difficult white water section on the Isel.

== Trail ==
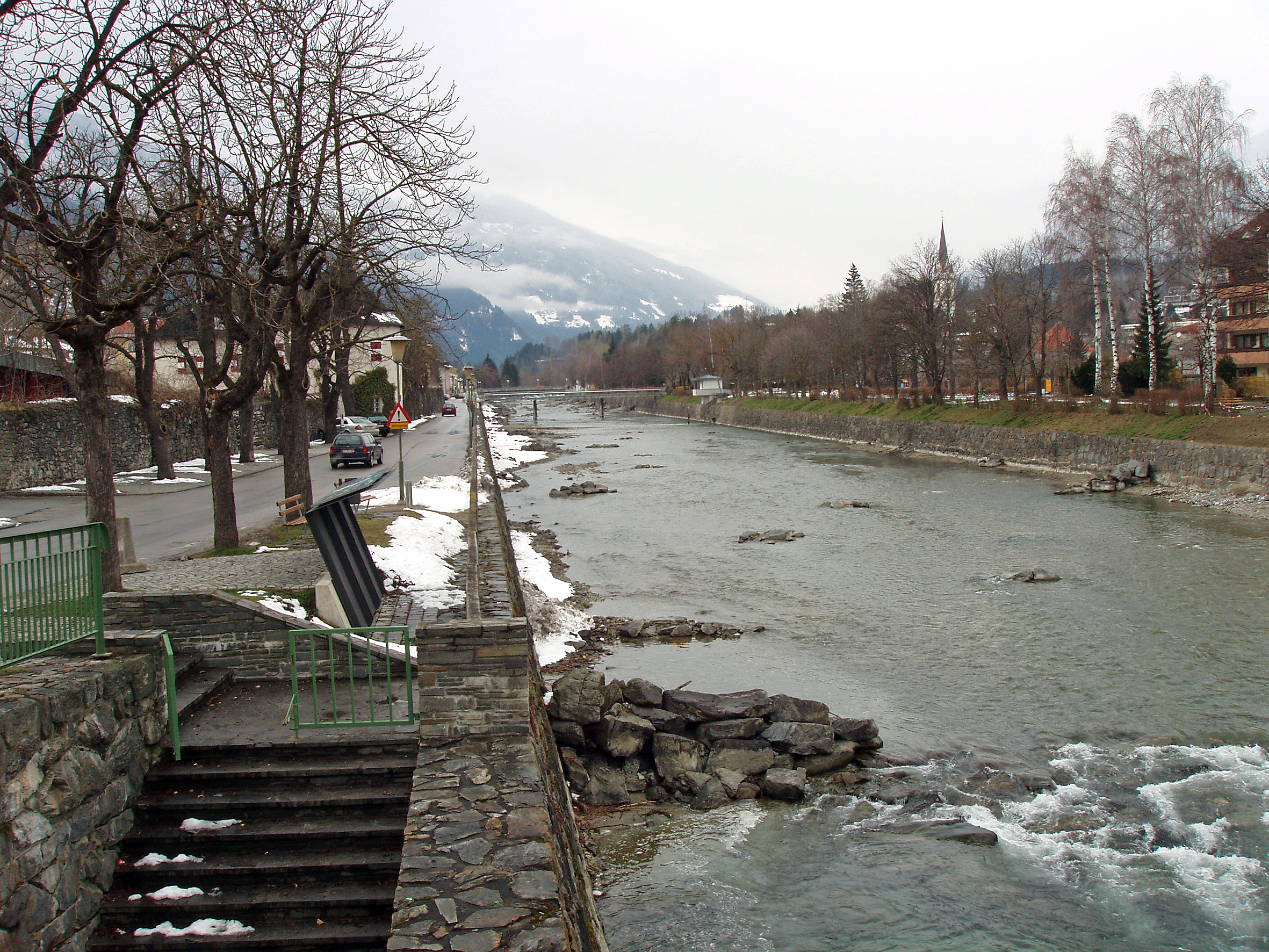
Isel in Lienz

In 2020 the 75 kilometres (47 mi) Isel Trail was opened to the public, leading from the town of Lienz up the Isel valley to the Umbalkees glacier. The upper part of the trail crosses wide alpine grasslands below the Umbalkees ice front, from which the Isel emerges to start its journey down to the Drava. The Upper Umbal Falls, where large volumes of water plunge over a series of steps, are visible at a distance from the trail. The Lower Umbal Falls were opened for visitors in 1976, and have platforms that let visitors view them from close up. The river bed here is smooth rock with washed-out hollows carved by the force of the water. There is another waterfall near Ströden, visible from the bridge.

Near Hinterbichl / Ströden the Glo Gorge is a crevice with almost vertical sides through which the Isel plunges down two large steps throwing huge amounts of spray into the air, often creating a rainbow in late afternoon. Between Welzelach and Bobojach there is a large gorge with a series of cataracts running between steep cliffs. Some of the trees in the canyon are several centuries old. There is a deep gorge below Virgen, with the lowest of the large waterfalls, a series of steps several meters high. The steep sides of the gorge hold relatively undisturbed forest with trees of all ages.

Near Feld the Isel valley narrows and the river is fast-moving and turbulent, running between wide banks of gravel. The cataracts here move large boulders downstream. The Daberer Waterfall is near the mountain village of Schlaiten surrounded by old trees, moss and rich undergrowth. At times of high water flow the waterfall creates a fine mist. On the slower-moving lower Isel between Huben and Lienz there are islands populated by tamarisk, with pinkish-white flowers from May to August.

== Sources ==
- Boch, Ronny; Spötl, Christoph; Reitner, Jürgen M.; Kramers, Jan (2005), "A Lateglacial Travertine Deposit in Eastern Tyrol (Austria)" (PDF), Austrian Journal of Earth Sciences, 98, Vienna: 78–91
- Hatz, Gunther (10 November 2011), "The power of the Isel beckons (Die Kraft der Isel lockt)", Kleine Zeitung (in German)
- "How This River Caused a 50-Year-Long Fight", austria.info
- Isel-Drau Description of the project area, IRIS
- Isel River Whitewater Rafting, Splash White Water Rafting
- Last glacial river in the Alps fights hydropower invasion, WWF, 21 September 2012
- "Natura 2000: Entire Isel nominated (Natura 2000: Ganze Isel nominiert)", tirol ORF.at/v2/news/stories/2718850/ (in German), 30 June 2015
- Pirkner, Gerhard (3 March 2011), "Secret: Prägraten and Virgen are planning the Isel power plant (Geheim: Prägraten und Virgen planen Isel-Kraftwerk)", Dolomitenstadt.at Online Magazin (in German)
- Pirkner, Gerhard (17 June 2012), "Victory of the supporters of the Isel power plant (Sieg der Befürworter des Isel-Kraftwerks)", Dolomitenstadt.at Online Magazin (in German)
- Racebook Kajak 2016 [Racebook whitewater kayak 2016] (PDF) (in German), archived from the original (PDF) on 2016-11-28
- Referendum in the Virgental (PDF) (in German), Citizens' initiative against the Virgental power plant, 17 June 2012
- The Isel trail, TVB Osttirol
