= Prägraten am Großvenediger =

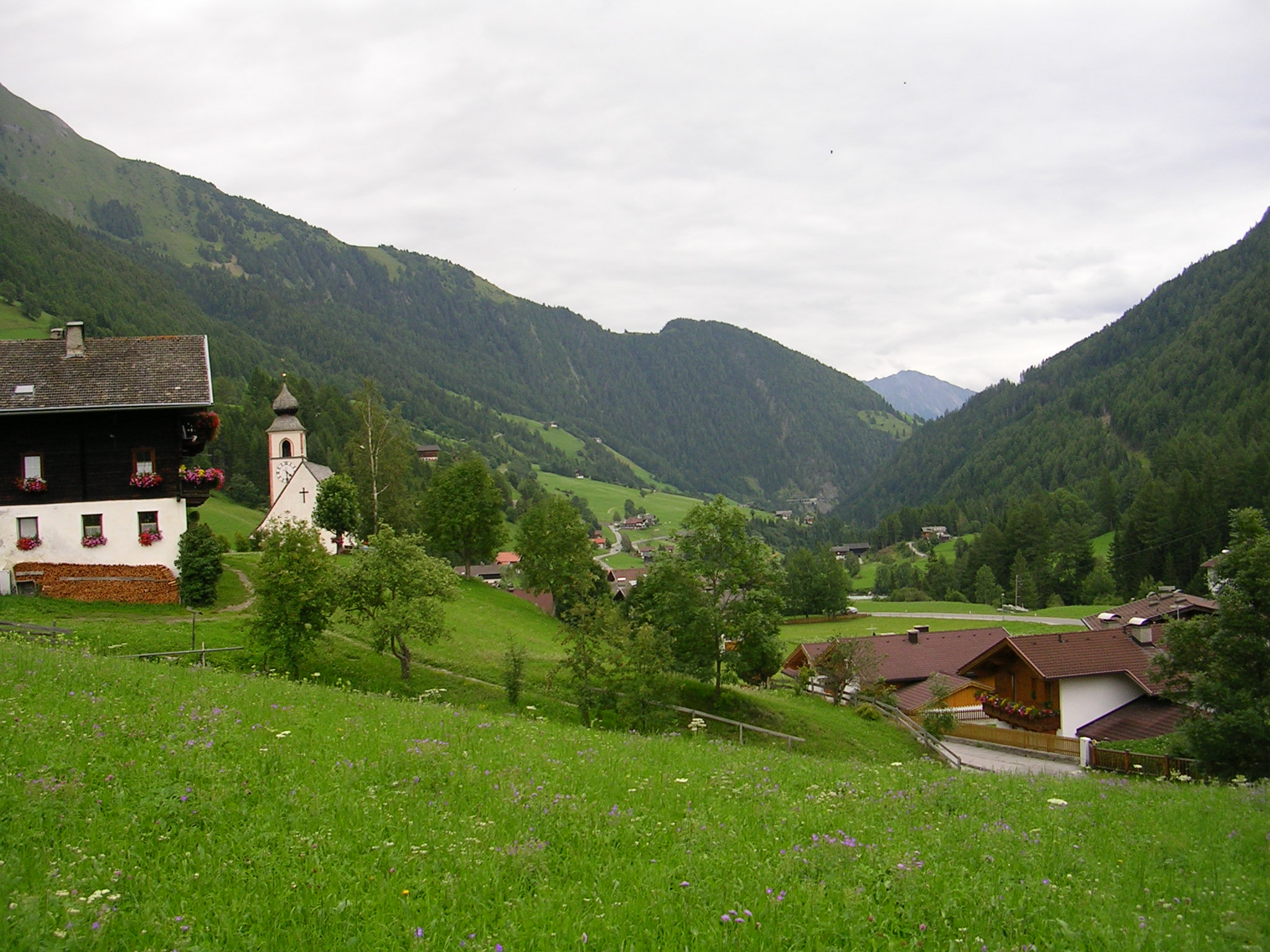

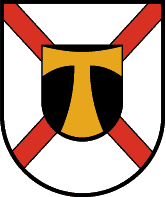
- Coat of arms

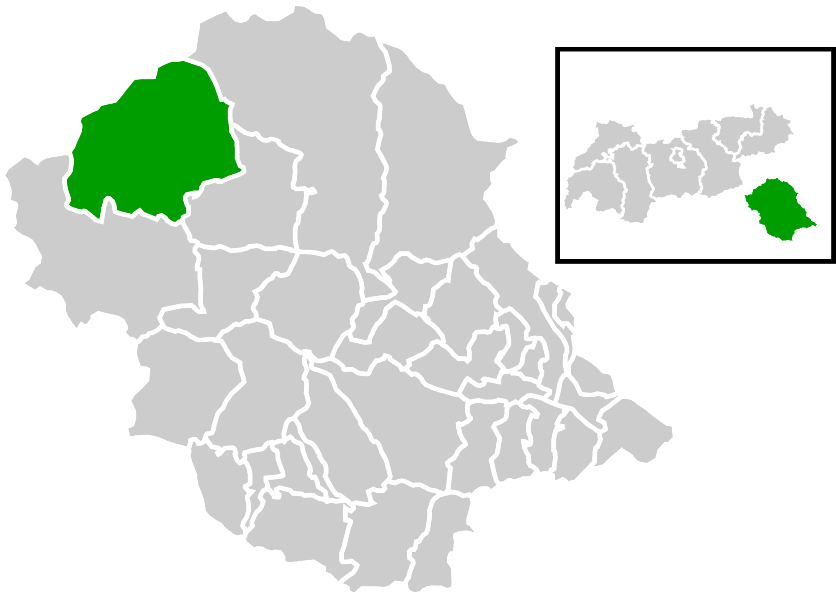
- Location within Lienz district

- Location within Austria Location within Tyrol
- Coordinates: 47°01′00″N 12°22′00″E
- Country: Austria
- State: Tyrol
- District: Lienz

Government
  - Mayor: Anton Steiner

Area
  - Total: 180.37 km^{2} (69.64 sq mi)
- Elevation: 1,312 m (4,304 ft)

Population (2021)
  - Total: 1,144
  - Density: 6.343/km^{2} (16.43/sq mi)
- Time zone: UTC+1 (CET)
  - Summer (DST): UTC+2 (CEST)
- Postal code: 9974
- Area code: 04877
- Vehicle registration: LZ
- Website: www.praegraten.info

Prägraten am Großvenediger is a municipality in the district of Lienz in the Austrian state of Tyrol.

== Population ==
Historical population
Year	Pop.	±%
1869	762	—
1880	737	−3.3%
1890	681	−7.6%
1900	643	−5.6%
1910	646	+0.5%
1923	637	−1.4%
1934	813	+27.6%
1939	822	+1.1%
1951	906	+10.2%
1961	1,047	+15.6%
1971	1,205	+15.1%
1981	1,266	+5.1%
1991	1,215	−4.0%
2001	1,274	+4.9%
2011	1,225	−3.8%
2016	1,170	−4.5%
