= Edelweißspitze =

Mountain in Austria

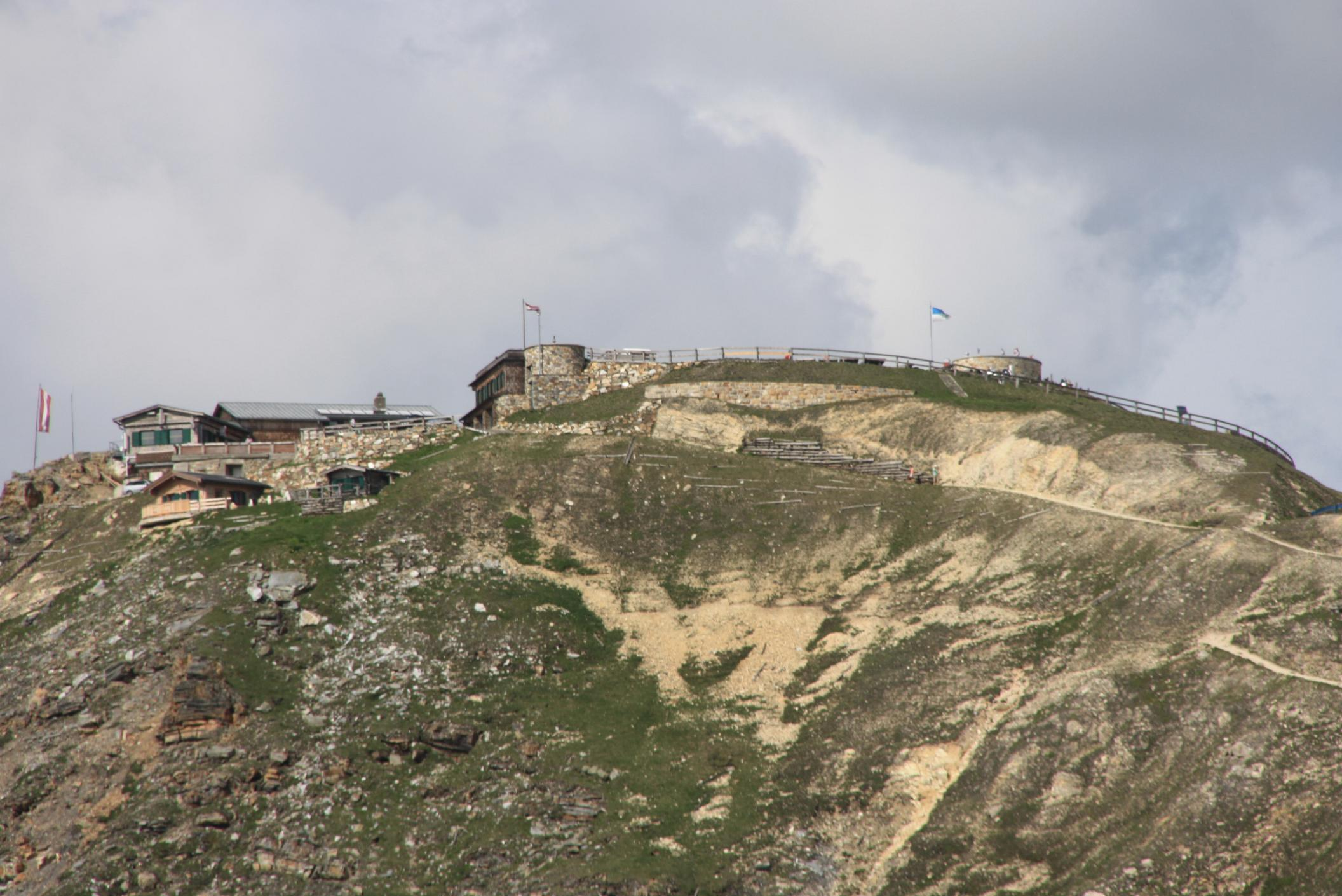
- View from Fuscher Törl to Edelweißspitze

Highest point
- Elevation: 2,572 m (8,438 ft)
- Prominence: 84 m (276 ft)
- Parent peak: Kendlkopf
- Isolation: 1.13km
- Listing: Glockner Group
- Coordinates: 47°7′25.32″N 12°49′52.37″E

Geography
- Location within Austria Location within Alps
- Location: Salzburg, Austria
- Parent range: High Tauern

The Edelweißspitze is a summit in High Tauern, located in Salzburg, Austria north of the Alpine divide. It can be accessed by car from Edelweißstraße, a branch-off from Grossglockner High Alpine Road, starting from Fuscher Törl and is the highest-accessible point of the road. Originally, its height was 2577m before building the parking lot and was named Poneck, Leitenkogel or Bergerkogel. It serves as a scenic viewpoint of the High Tauern National Park with views to summits of the Glockner Group. In north-west direction, there is a hut which includes a restaurant.

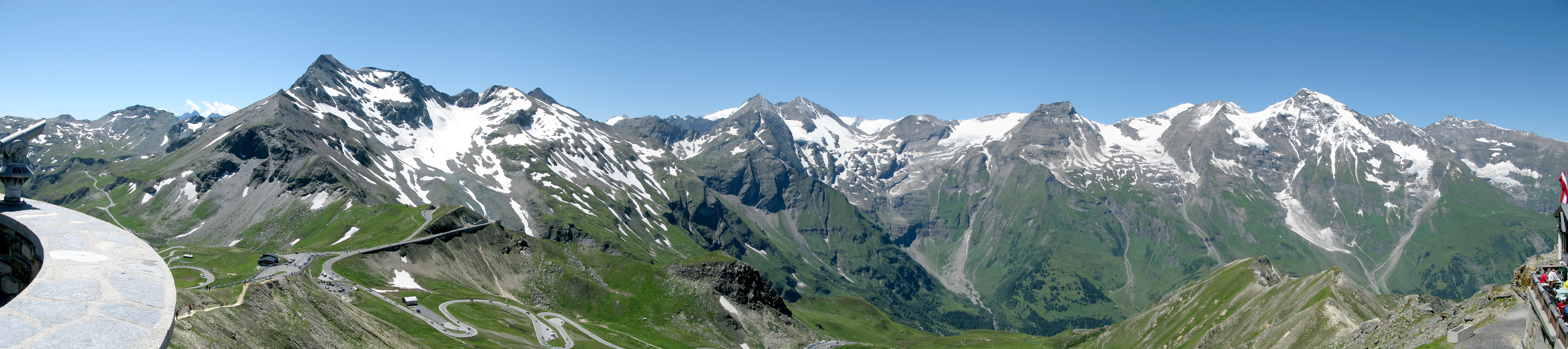
View from Edelweißspitze: On the left site Fuscher Törl, and the summits Brennkogel (3018m), Kloben (2938m), Fuscherkarkopf (3331m), Breitkopf (3151m) and Hohe Dock (3348m).
