= Großer Bärenkopf =

Twin-topped mountain in the Austrian Central Alps

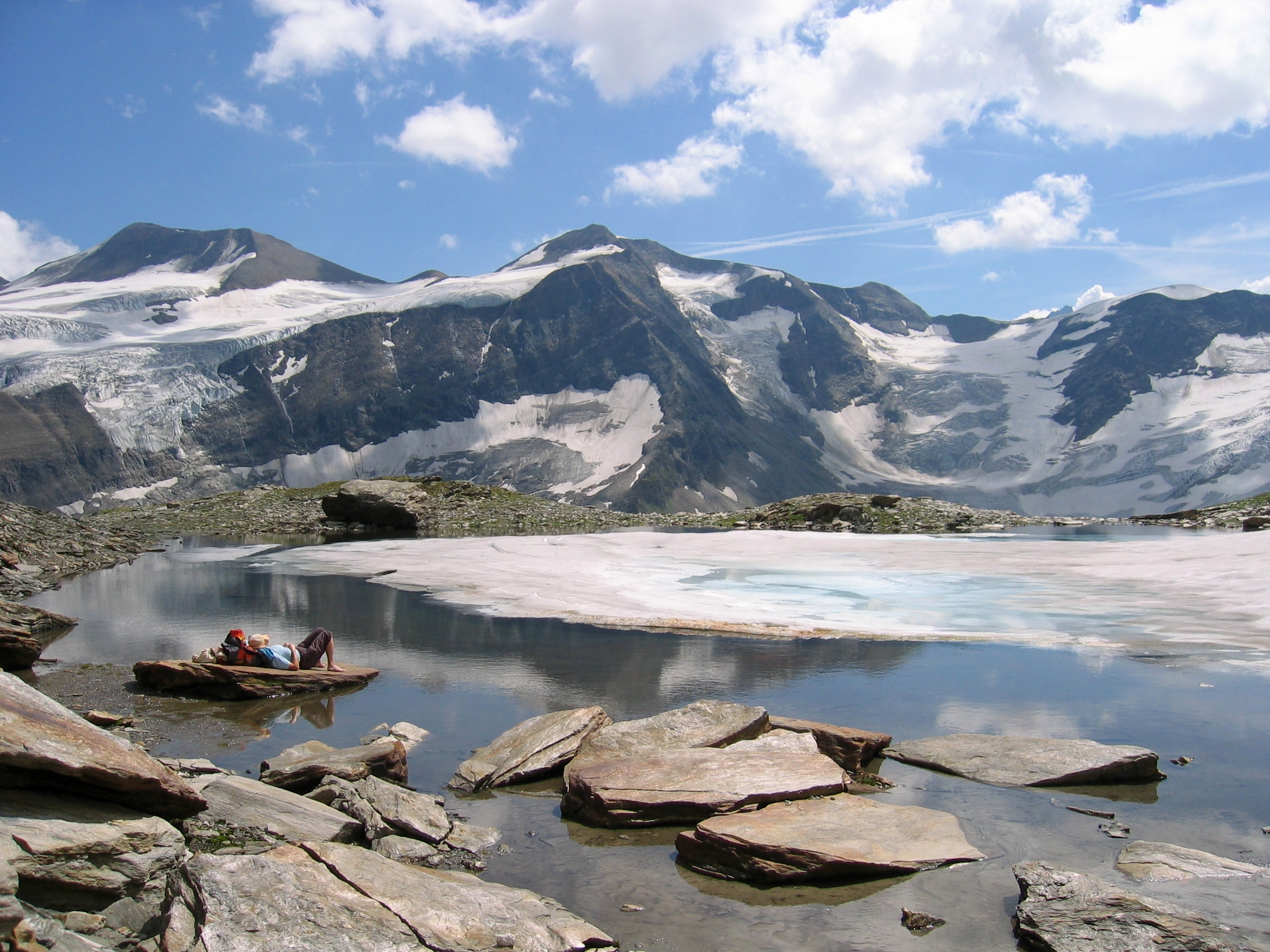
- Großer Bärenkopf (left), Mittlerer and Vorderer Bärenkopf (center) and Schattseitköpfl (right)

Highest point
- Elevation: 3,396 m (AA) (11,142 ft)
- Prominence: 3,396-3,094 m ↓ Riffltor
- Isolation: 1.7 km → Klockerin
- Listing: Alpine mountains above 3000 m
- Coordinates: 47°07′51″N 12°43′53″E

Geography
- Location within Austria
- Location: Carinthia and Salzburg, Austria
- Parent range: Glockner Group, High Tauern

Climbing
- First ascent: 18 September 1869 by Karl Hofmann, Johann Stüdl and mountain guides, Thomas Groder and Josef Schnell
- Normal route: High mountain tour from the Oberwalder Hut over a glacier to the Keilscharte notch and along the west arête to the summit

The Große Bärenkopf ("Great Bear's Head") or Weißer Bärenkopf ("White Bear's Head") is a twin-topped mountain in the Glockner Group in the Fuscher/Kapruner Kamm of the High Tauern, a range in the Austrian Central Alps. The mountain lies exactly on the border between the states of Salzburg and Carinthia.

The main summit is 3,396 m (AA) metres high; the west summit reaches a height of 3,353 m. The two peaks are about 300 metres away from one another. There are arêtes running away from the top in all four directions of the compass. Seen from the northeast, the Großer Bärenkopf, has the shape of a wide, prominent, firn- covered mountain. From the other directions it looks like a rocky peak. The mountain was first climbed on 18 September 1869 by Munich Alpinists Karl Hofmann, Prague merchant, Johann Stüdl, and mountain guides Thomas Groder and Josef Schnell from Kals am Großglockner on their exploratory tour, that took them on the same day to the neighbouring peaks of the Hinterer Bratschenkopf and Klockerin to the north. Today the Großer Bärenkopf is often climbed during a crossing from the Oberwalder Hut and the Heinrich Schwaiger Haus.

== Location and area ==
The Großer Bärenkopf is surrounded by heavily crevassed glaciers. To the east, north and west lie the western and eastern Bärenkopfkees, which climb up to the summit; to the south is the Bockkarkees. Neighbouring peaks are the 3,425-metre-high Klockerin on the line of the north arête and separated by the col of Gruberscharte at a height of 3,080 metres; and the Hohe Dock at 3,348 metres on the line of the east arête, separated by the col of Dockscharte at 3,234 metres. To the south, on the far side of the Bockkarkees, lies the 3,115-metre-high Breitkopf. Along the west arête, separated by the Keilscharte saddle (3,187 m), lies the Mittlere Bärenkopf ("Middle Bear's Head", 3,358 m) and roughly north of it the Schwarzköpfl with a height of 3,124 metres. The nearest significant settlements are Kaprun, about 9 kilometres as the crow flies to the north in the Pinzgau, and Fusch an der Großglocknerstraße, 11 kilometres to the northeast.

== Bases and tours ==
The route taken by the Alpinists in 1869 ran "in the best possible, clear weather" from the Kaprun side up to a mountain which they thought was the Großer Bärenkopf. In fact, they were standing on an unknown peak which was still not shown on contemporary maps and was first named in 1891 as the Glockerin. They route then continued along the east arête to the peak known today as the "Großer Bärenkopf". They also climbed the Hinterer Bratschenkopf. For orientation they only had the 1859 Tauern map by Franz Keil which was very inaccurate, however, because Keil himself was not able to penetrate very far into the region. That they had been fortunate enough on 18 September to succeed in making three first ascents only became clear when the Alpine Club map was published in 1891 and, for the first time, clearly enabled the mountains to be allocated names.

Even today, the Großer Bärenkopf can only be reached as part of a serious high mountain tour with appropriate equipment and experience of glaciers. The present normal route was first used in 1871 and has proved to be the easiest climb. Possible bases for the tour include the Heinrich Schwaiger Haus at 2,802 metres, the Mooserbodens above it and to the east, or the Oberwalder Hut (2,973 m), northwest and above Franz Josefs Höhe. From the Oberwalder Hut the route runs in a northerly direction as a serious glacier trail across the Wasserfallwinkel and the Bockkarkees to the Keilscharte col, then heads east along the west arête to the summit of the Großer Bärenkopf. In the Gruberscharte col, in the north arête of the peak, lies a bothy at 3,100 metres with 9 emergency beds. From the hut the ascent takes about 3 hours according to the literature. The west arête requires gentle climbing at UIAA grade I. Since 1925 the south arête has also been used as an alternative route and is classified as UIAA grade II. Climbing routes used in 1925 by Hubert Peterka and Hans Majer up the southwest face are rarely used today due to the dangers involved.

== Literature and maps ==
- Willi End: Alpenvereinsführer Glocknergruppe, Bergverlag Rother, Munich, 2003, ISBN 3-7633-1266-8
- Eduard Richter: Die Erschließung der Ostalpen, Vol III, Verlag des Deutschen und Oesterreichischen Alpenvereins, Berlin, 1894
- Alpine Club map 1:25,000 series, Sheet 40, Glocknergruppe
