= Racherin =

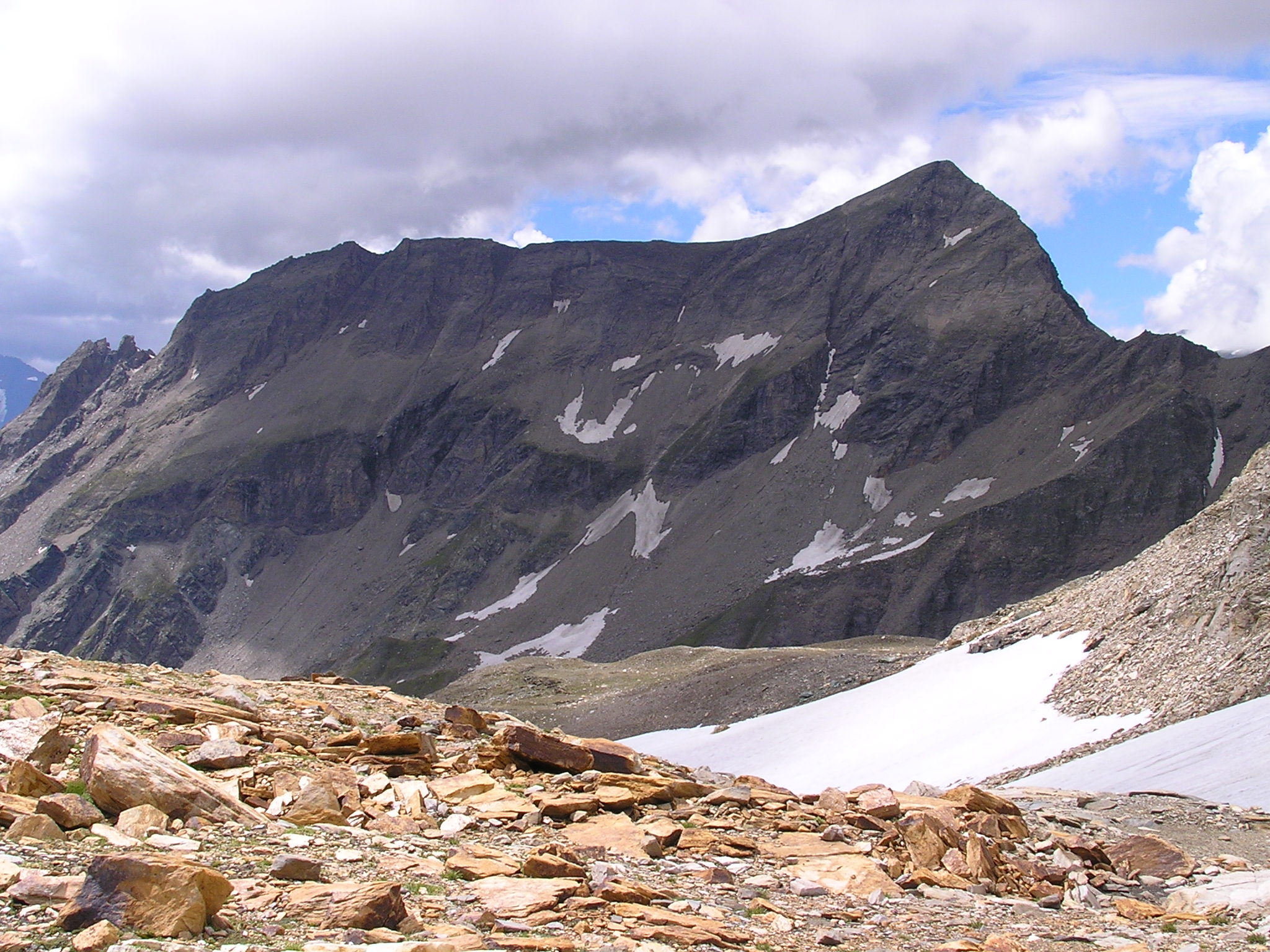
- The Racherin (right) seen from the northeast

Highest point
- Elevation: 3,092 m (AA) (10,144 ft)
- Prominence: 429 m ↓ Untere Pfandlscharte
- Isolation: 3.15 km → Sinwelleck
- Listing: Alpine mountains above 3000 m
- Coordinates: 47°04′52″N 12°47′38″E

Geography
- Location within Austria
- Location: Carinthia
- Parent range: High Tauern, Glockner Group

Climbing
- Normal route: Ascent from the south (unmarked)

The Racherin, a mountain with a height of 3,092 m (AA), lies in the Glockner Group in the High Tauern range in Austria. The summit is located ca. 6 km, as the crow flies, northwest of Heiligenblut in the state of Carinthia. The unmarked and mostly trackless normal route is not difficult in snow-free and dry conditions, but is rather laborious. An ascent therefore requires a good sense of direction. In suitable weather there are good views from the top, including an impressive view of the Großglockner and the surrounding mountain world.

== Ascent ==
The starting point for the normal route is a small car park by the Großglockner High Alpine Road signed as Schöne Wand (2,046 m), ca. 1 km west of the Rasthaus Schöneck inn (1,945 m above sea level (AA)). The unmarked climb begins at a memorial cross and runs in several loops initially northeast, but soon swings northwest and runs almost parallel to the Großglockner High Alpine Road in the so-called Albitzen, a broad area of alm on the southern slopes of the Racherin. Here the track disappears and climbers need to head north and scale steep pastures to an unmanaged alm hut (ca. 2,400 m). Further north the terrain is initially gentle, but later becomes steep before reaching a prominent gully. The route now follows the left hand side of the gully to a height of about ca. 2,950 m (care must be taken due to the fine scree). Heading slightly right, the route crosses a relatively gentle, bratsch-covered slope to the summit. (Journey time from the Schöne Wand car park: ca. 3 hours)

== Literature and maps ==
- Willi End: Alpine Club Guide Glockner- und Granatspitzgruppe. Bergverlag Rudolf Rother, 10th edn., 2003, ISBN 978-3-7633-1266-5
- Alpine Club map, Sheet 40, 1:25,000 series, Glocknergruppe
