= Fuscherkarkopf =

Peak of a mountain in the Austrian Central Alps

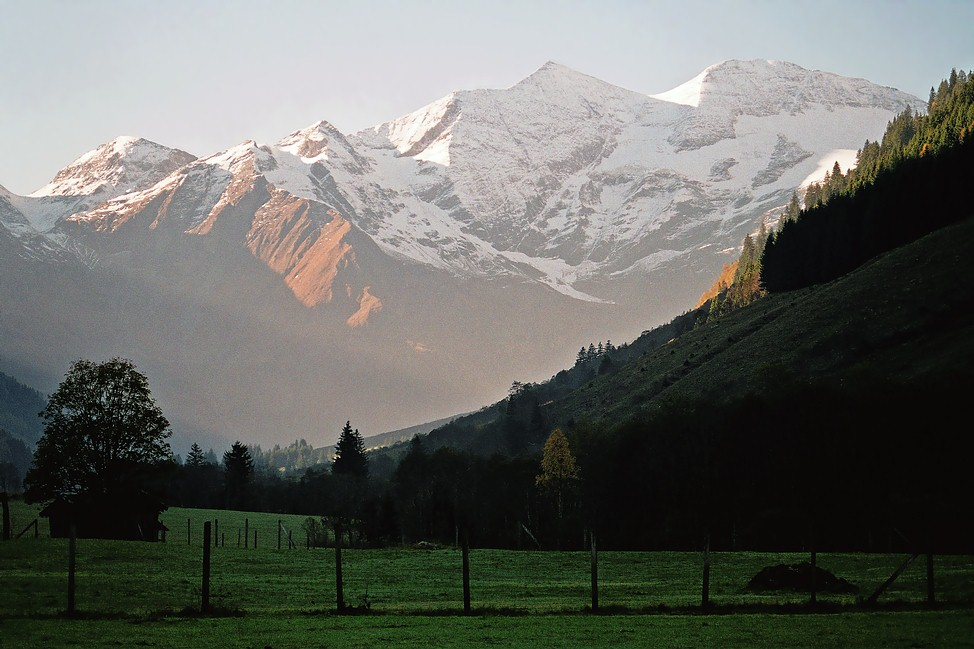
- The Fuscherkarkopf (extreme right) from Ferleiten in the Fuscher Valley

Highest point
- Elevation: 3,331 m (AA) (10,928 ft)
- Prominence: 490 m ↓ Fuscherkar Scharte
- Isolation: 3.53 km → Hohe Dock
- Listing: Alpine mountains above 3000 m
- Coordinates: 47°05′59″N 12°44′41″E

Geography
- Location within Austria
- Location: Border between Carinthia and Salzburg, Austria
- Parent range: Austrian Central Alps, High Tauern, Glockner Group, centre of main Tauern chain

Geology
- Mountain type(s): calc-schist, Bratschen

Climbing
- First ascent: in the 1840s by Gregor Maier

The Fuscherkarkopf, sometimes also written Fuscher-Kar-Kopf in German and formerly also called the Fuschereiskarkopf, is one of the twin peaks of a mountain in the Glockner Group in the centre of the main mountain chain (Mittleren Tauernhauptkamm) in the High Tauern, a range in the Austrian Central Alps. The mountain lies right on the border between the Austrian states of Salzburg and Carinthia. The main peak is 3,331 metres high, but the northwest summit is only 3,252 metres high. The two peaks are about 500 metres apart and linked by a curved firn-covered ridge. Further sharp, prominent ridges run away to the northwest and west, forming the main crest of the Tauern. To the southwest the Heiligenblut Open Face (Heiligenbluter Freiwand) branches off, a mighty side ridge that starts as the southeast ridge (Südostgrat) at the Fuscherkarkopf. The northwest summit has a great, 650-metre-high (2,130 ft) West Face (Westwand), that used to be covered with firn, but today is covered with loose rock slabs. The mountain is easy to reach from the Hofmanns Hut over the southwest ridge (Südwestgrat) and offers a good view of the Großglockner and the Pasterze. The peak was first climbed in the 1840s by the hunter, Gregor Maier, known as Badhans, from Fusch.

== Surrounding area ==
The Fuscherkarkopf is surrounded by glaciers except to the southeast. To the west lies Waterfall Corner (Wasserfallwinkel), which is the southern, lower part of the Bockkarkeeses glacier, to the north is the small Fuscherkarkees and to the west the relatively insignificant Freiwandkees. Finally, to the south is the Pasterze, the largest glacier in the Eastern Alps. The nearest mountains along the Northwest Ridge, separated by the wind gap of the Fuscherkarscharte (up to 2,841 m), are the Breitkopf (3,115 m) and, beyond that, the Middle Bärenkopf (Mittlere Bärenkopf, 3,358 m). Along the Western Ridge, that forms the main Tauern crest and is separated by a gap (Einschartung) with the name Der Rinner (3,145 m), is the Sinabeleck (3,261 m). Further east it is followed by the Kapuziner (2,852 m) and the Spielmann (3,027 m). To the southeast, along the Heiligenblut Open Face, and separated by the Freiwandscharte (2,975 m), rise the summits of the Freiwandspitz (3,034 m) and Freiwandkopf (2,854 m). South of the two peaks is the Gamsgrube, a massive, bowl-shaped cirque, 600 metres across. The nearest settlement of any importance is Heiligenblut in Carinthia, which lies about 8 kilometres away as the crow flies. A good 15 kilometres northeast lies the Salzburg village of Fusch an der Großglocknerstraße.

== Sources and maps ==
- Willi End: Alpenvereinsführer Glocknergruppe, Bergverlag Rother, Munich, 2003, ISBN 3-7633-1266-8
- Eduard Richter (editor): Die Erschließung der Ostalpen, Vol III, Verlag des Deutschen und Oesterreichischen Alpenvereins, Berlin 1894
- Alpine Club Map 1:25.000, Sheet 40, Glocknergruppe
