= Glockner Group =

Group of mountains in Austria

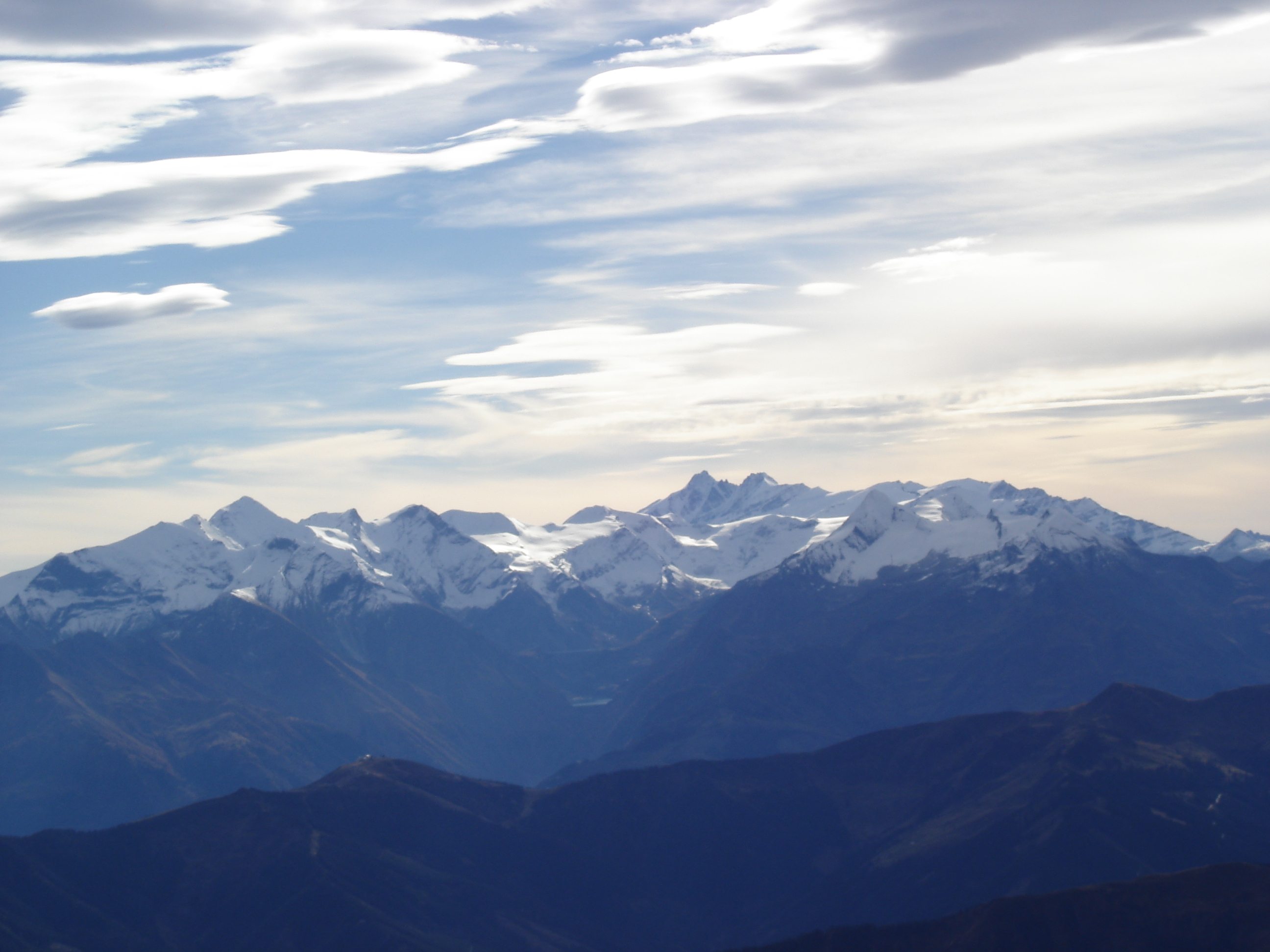
- Glockner Group from the north

Highest point
- Peak: Großglockner
- Elevation: 3,798 m above sea level (AA)

Geography
- Location within Austria
- Country: Austria
- States: East Tyrol, Salzburg and Carinthia
- Range coordinates: 47°04′30″N 12°41′40″E
- Parent range: High Tauern

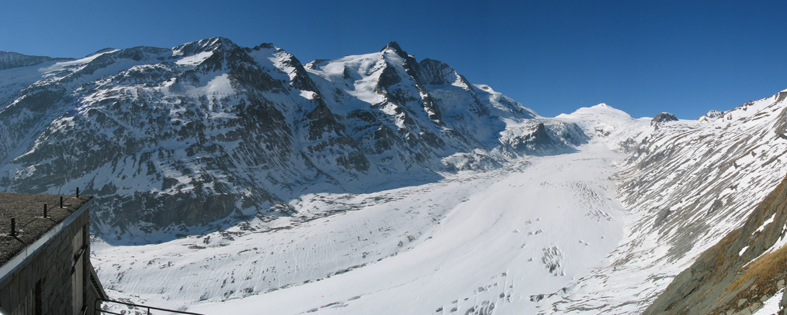
The Pasterze with the Großglockner (centre) and the Johannisberg (centre right rear)

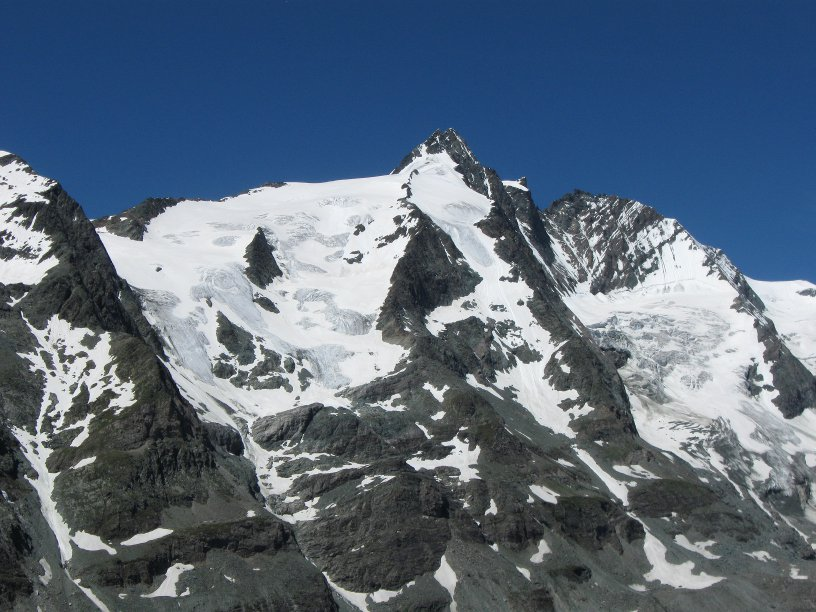
The Großglockner is the highest mountain in the Glockner Group

The Glockner Group (German: Glocknergruppe) is a sub-group of the Austrian Central Alps in the Eastern Alps, and is located in the centre section of the High Tauern on the main chain of the Alps.

The Glockner Group lies in Austria in the federal states of Salzburg, Tyrol and Carinthia. The three states meet at a tripoint on the summit of the Eiskögele (3,436 m (AA)).

The highest summit of the Glockner Group and also the highest peak in Austria is the Großglockner (3,798 m above sea level (AA)), which gives the mountain group its name. Considerable portions of the Glockner Group belong to the core zone of the High Tauern National Park. Also found in the Glockner Group is the Pasterze, the largest glacier in Austria.

== Boundaries ==
The boundaries of the Glockner Group are defined as follows: the River Salzach from Uttendorf to Taxenbach; the Rauriser Tal to Wörth; Seidlwinkltal; Hochtor (Großglockner High Alpine Road); Tauernbach; Möll to its confluence with the Moosbach; Moosbach; Peischlachtörl; Peischlachbach; Kals am Großglockner; Kalser Bach; Dorfertal; Dorfersee; Kalser Tauern; Weißsee; Weißenbach; Grünsee; Enzingerboden; Stubachtal; Uttendorf.

Together with the Ankogel Group, the Goldberg Group, the Schober Group, the Kreuzeck Group, the Granatspitz Group, the Venediger Group, the Villgraten Mountains and the Rieserferner Group the Glockner Group forms the mountain range of the High Tauern.

== Neighbouring ranges ==
The Glockner Group borders on the following ranges in the Alps:

- Kitzbühel Alps (to the northwest)
- Salzburg Slate Alps (to the northeast)
- Goldberg Group (to the east)
- Schober Group (to the south)
- Granatspitze Group (to the west)

== Peaks ==
The named three-thousanders in the Glockner Group:

- Großglockner, 3,798 m above sea level (AA)
- Kleinglockner, 3,770 m above sea level (AA)
- Glocknerwand, 3,721 m above sea level (AA)
- Teufelshorn, 3,680 m above sea level (AA)
- Großes Wiesbachhorn, 3,564 m above sea level (AA)
- Romariswandköpfe, 3,511 m above sea level (AA)
- Teufelskamp, 3,511 m above sea level (AA)
- Schneewinkelkopf, 3,476 m above sea level (AA)
- Johannisberg, 3,453 m above sea level (AA)
- Eiskögele, 3,426 m above sea level (AA)
- Klockerin, 3,425 m above sea level (AA)
- Hinterer Bratschenkopf, 3,413 m above sea level (AA)
- Vorderer Bratschenkopf, 3,401 m above sea level (AA)
- Großer Bärenkopf, 3,396 m above sea level (AA)
- Hoher Tenn, 3,360 m above sea level (AA)
- Mittlerer Bärenkopf, 3,358 m above sea level (AA)
- Hohe Dock, 3,348 m above sea level (AA)
- Hohe Riffl, 3,338 m above sea level (AA)
- Fuscherkarkopf, 3,331 m above sea level (AA)
- Schneespitze, 3,317 m above sea level (AA)
- Hohenwartkopf, 3,308 m above sea level (AA)
- Kleines Wiesbachhorn, 3,283 m above sea level (AA)
- Sinwelleck, 3,281 m above sea level (AA)
- Gramul, 3,276 m above sea level (AA)
- Vorderer Bärenkopf, 3,249 m above sea level (AA)
- Schwerteck, 3,247 m above sea level (AA)
- Kellerskopf, 3,239 m above sea level (AA)
- Luisenkopf, 3,207 m above sea level (AA)
- Hocheiser, 3,206 m above sea level (AA)
- Kitzsteinhorn, 3,203 m above sea level (AA)
- Hoher Kasten, 3,189 m above sea level (AA)
- Schattseitköpfl, 3,182 m above sea level (AA)
- Oberer Fochezkopf, 3,159 m above sea level (AA)
- Kleiner Tenn, 3,158 m above sea level (AA)
- Gamsspitze, 3,157 m above sea level (AA)
- Breitkopf, 3,154 m above sea level (AA)
- Totenkopf, 3,151 m above sea level (AA)
- Bauernbrachkopf, 3,125 m above sea level (AA)
- Schwarzköpfl, 3,124 m above sea level (AA)
- Zwingkopf, 3,117 m above sea level (AA)
- Freiwandkasten, 3,114 m above sea level (AA)
- Schwertkopf, 3,099 m above sea level (AA)
- Racherin, 3,092 m above sea level (AA)
- Lange Wand, 3,087 m above sea level (AA)
- Grieskogel, 3,066 m above sea level (AA)
- Blaue Köpfe, 3,061 m above sea level (AA)
- Freiwandspitz, 3,034 m above sea level (AA)
- Wasserradkopf, 3,032 m above sea level (AA)
- Kreuzwandspitze, 3,031 m above sea level (AA)
- Spielmann, 3,027 m above sea level (AA)
- Zollspitze, 3,024 m above sea level (AA)
- Brennkogel, 3,018 m above sea level (AA)
- Rifflkarkopf, 3,016 m above sea level (AA)
- Kellerswand, 3,010 m above sea level (AA)
- Kristallspitzl, 3,005 m above sea level (AA)

== Tourism ==
The region is well developed for tourism: The Großglockner High Alpine Road (and its branch to Franz Josefs Höhe), the road from Uttendorf to the Enzingerboden, the bus transfers to the reservoirs near Kaprun and the toll road from Kals am Großglockner to the Lucknerhaus enable cars and public transport to travel well into the mountains. A large number of Alpine huts offer accommodation for walkers and climbers:

- Glocknerhaus, 2,132 m above sea level (AA)
- Hofmanns Hut, 2,444 m above sea level (AA)
- Oberwalder Hut, 2,973 m above sea level (AA)
- Salm Hut, 2,644 m above sea level (AA)
- Schwarzenberg Hut, 2,267 m above sea level (AA)
- Ebmatten-Fürthermoaralm, 1,803 m above sea level (AA)
- Erzherzog Johann Hut, 3,454 m above sea level (AA)
- Gleiwitzer Hut, 2,172 m above sea level (AA)
- Glorer Hut, 2,642 m above sea level (AA)
- Heinrich Schwaiger Haus, 2,802 m above sea level (AA)
- Krefeld Hut, 2,295 m above sea level (AA)
- Stüdl Hut, 2,801 m above sea level (AA)
- Franz Josefs Haus, 2,363 m above sea level (AA)
- Fuschertörlhaus, 2,445 m above sea level (AA)
- Luckner Hut, 2,241 m above sea level (AA)

== Power generation ==
The power industry in Austria and the Austrian Federal Railways use water from the Glockner Group to generate electricity at Kaprun, Franz Josefs Höhe (Margaritze Reservoir), and Enzingerboden (Weißsee, Tauernmoossee).

== Climate ==
Enzingerboden is a weather station located in the upper valley of Stubachtal, on the northern slopes of the Glockner Group. It is located on the plateau of the same name at an elevation of 1,480 metres (4,860 ft).

Climate data for Enzingerboden: 1480m (1991−2020 normals, 1971−2000 snowfall)
Month	Jan	Feb	Mar	Apr	May	Jun	Jul	Aug	Sep	Oct	Nov	Dec	Year
Record high °C (°F)	14.3 (57.7)	14.8 (58.6)	15.8 (60.4)	20.1 (68.2)	24.6 (76.3)	30.3 (86.5)	30.0 (86.0)	29.9 (85.8)	26.5 (79.7)	22.7 (72.9)	18.7 (65.7)	14.1 (57.4)	30.3 (86.5)
Mean daily maximum °C (°F)	0.5 (32.9)	1.4 (34.5)	4.5 (40.1)	8.4 (47.1)	12.3 (54.1)	17.0 (62.6)	18.2 (64.8)	17.5 (63.5)	13.9 (57.0)	10.0 (50.0)	4.9 (40.8)	1.1 (34.0)	9.1 (48.4)
Daily mean °C (°F)	−3.1 (26.4)	−2.7 (27.1)	0.3 (32.5)	4.1 (39.4)	8.5 (47.3)	12.1 (53.8)	13.9 (57.0)	13.8 (56.8)	9.9 (49.8)	6.2 (43.2)	1.5 (34.7)	−2.2 (28.0)	5.2 (41.3)
Mean daily minimum °C (°F)	−6.3 (20.7)	−7.0 (19.4)	−3.7 (25.3)	−0.3 (31.5)	3.6 (38.5)	7.4 (45.3)	8.7 (47.7)	8.5 (47.3)	5.5 (41.9)	2.2 (36.0)	−1.7 (28.9)	−5.2 (22.6)	1.0 (33.8)
Record low °C (°F)	−25.3 (−13.5)	−21.8 (−7.2)	−21.5 (−6.7)	−14.4 (6.1)	−6.5 (20.3)	−1.0 (30.2)	−0.1 (31.8)	−0.2 (31.6)	−3.1 (26.4)	−11.9 (10.6)	−16.0 (3.2)	−20.1 (−4.2)	−25.3 (−13.5)
Average precipitation mm (inches)	72.8 (2.87)	65.9 (2.59)	92.4 (3.64)	108.8 (4.28)	133.7 (5.26)	179.7 (7.07)	204.9 (8.07)	186.5 (7.34)	137.0 (5.39)	120.5 (4.74)	96.9 (3.81)	82.4 (3.24)	1,481.5 (58.3)
Average snowfall cm (inches)	74.3 (29.3)	74.0 (29.1)	99.9 (39.3)	74.4 (29.3)	23.4 (9.2)	1.8 (0.7)	0.4 (0.2)	0.3 (0.1)	2.3 (0.9)	28.4 (11.2)	76.9 (30.3)	85.4 (33.6)	541.5 (213.2)
Average precipitation days (≥ 1.0 mm)	11.4	10.1	12.7	12.8	14.7	16.6	17.2	16.3	13.1	11.6	11.2	12.1	159.8
Average snowy days (≥ 1 cm)	31.0	28.3	30.0	26.1	6.4	0.8	0.1	0.1	1.3	7.1	22.0	29.6	182.8
Source: Central Institute for Meteorology and Geodynamics

== Maps ==
- German Alpine Club: Alpine Club Map No. 40 Glocknergruppe. 9th ed., Munich, 2006, ISBN 3-928777-87-4.

== Sources ==
- Wolfgang Pusch: "Stau unterm Gipfelkreuz und Einsamkeit über den Wolken - alpine Möglichkeiten in der Glocknergruppe" in: Berg 2007 (Alpine Club Yearbook, Vol. 131) with Alpine Club map 40 of the Glocknergruppe, ISBN 3-937530-15-0, pp. 280–285.
