= Klockerin =

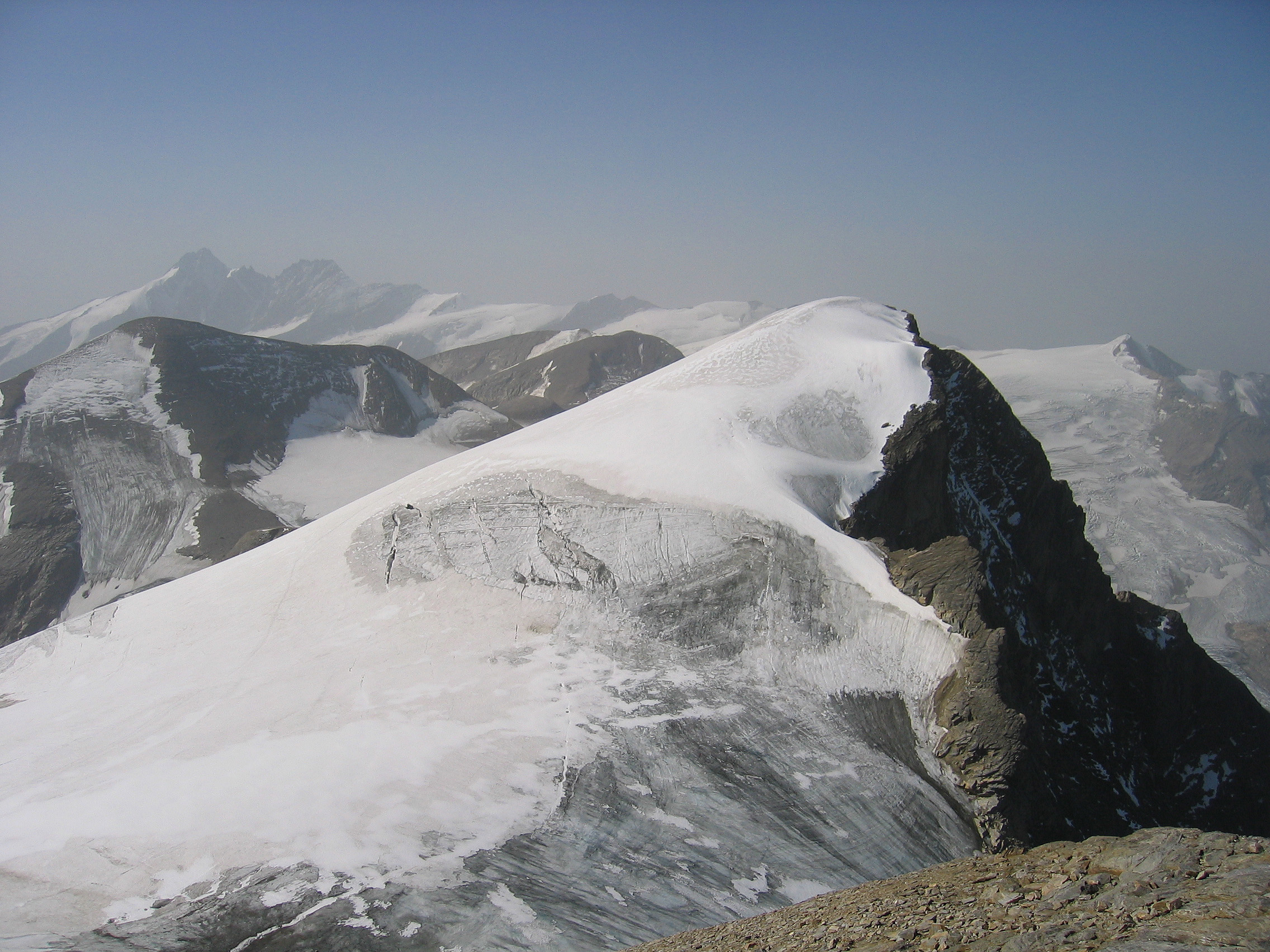
- The Klockerin from the Hinterer Bratschenkopf. Behind: the Großglockner

Highest point
- Elevation: 3,422 m (AA) (11,227 ft)
- Prominence: 166 m ↓ Wielingerscharte
- Isolation: 1.6 km → Großes Wiesbachhorn
- Coordinates: 47°08′49″N 12°44′09″E

Geography
- Location within Austria
- Location: Salzburg, Austria
- Parent range: Glockner Group, High Tauern

Climbing
- First ascent: 18 September 1869 by Karl Hofmann, Johann Stüdl and guides, Thomas Groder and Josef Schnell
- Normal route: from the Oberwalder Hut via Wasserfallwinkel and the Bockkarkees glacier to the Keilscharte col, then northeast across the Bärenkopfkees glacier to the Gruberscharte notch and along the South Ridge (Südkamm)

The Klockerin, formerly also called the Glockerin or Glocknerin, is a twin-peaked mountain in the Glockner Group on the ridge of Fuscher/Kapruner Kamm in the High Tauern, a range within the Central Alps in the Austrian state of Salzburg. Its southwest top (Südwestgipfel) is 3,422 m (AA) high, its northeast top (Nordostgipfel) has a height of 3,335 m. The two summits are about 240 metres apart. A prominent arête runs westwards; the west-northwestern arête is a short, but knife-edge ridge of rock. The Klockerin has a mighty Northwest Face which is 920 metres high, has a gradient of 54° and was first climbed by Karl Wien and Willo Welzenbach in 1926. The mountain is geographically dominant compared with the southern and western neighbouring peaks. Especially from the west, where the Mooserboden Reservoir (surface at 2,036 m) lies, the Klockerin appears as a mighty massif. The mountain was first climbed on 18 September 1869 by German alpinist, Karl Hofmann, Prague merchant, Johann Stüdl and mountain guides, Thomas Groder and Josef Schnell from Kals am Großglockner.

== Literature and maps ==
- Willi End: Glocknergruppe, Alpine Club Guide Bergverlag Rother, Munich, 2003, ISBN 3-7633-1266-8
- Eduard Richter: Die Erschliessung der Ostalpen, III. Band, Verlag des Deutschen und Oesterreichischen Alpenvereins, Berlin, 1894
- Alpine Club map 1:25,000 series, Sheet 40, Glocknergruppe
