= Johannisberg (High Tauern) =

Mountain in the Glockner Group, Austria

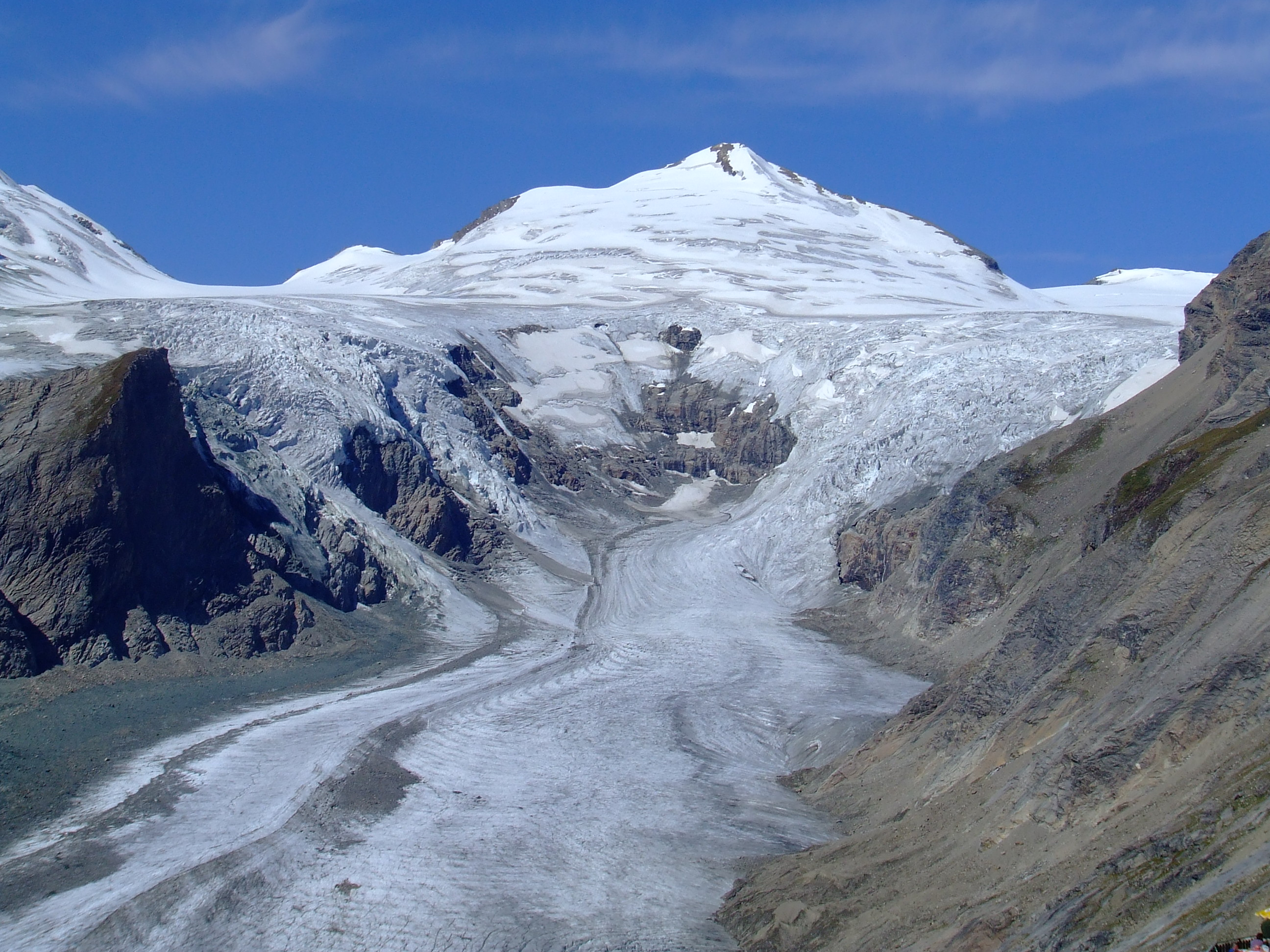
- Johannisberg peak and Pasterze Glacier (2006), view from Kaiser-Franz-Josefs-Höhe, Grossglockner High Alpine Road

Highest point
- Elevation: 3,453 m (AA) (11,329 ft)
- Prominence: 293
- Listing: Alpine mountains above 3000 m
- Coordinates: 47°06′34″N 12°40′22″E

Geography
- Location within Alps
- Location: Border between Carinthia and Salzburg, Austria
- Parent range: High Tauern; Glockner Group

Climbing
- First ascent: 28 August 1859, by Anton von Ruthner

The Johannisberg (formerly also called Keeserkopf and Herzoghut) is a 3,453 metres (11,329 ft) high mountain in the Glockner Group of the High Tauern, a mountain range of the Central Eastern Alps in Austria.

The peak is located in the central section of the main Tauern crest, right on the border between the Austrian states of Salzburg and Carinthia, near the tripoint with East Tyrol. It was given its present name in honour of Archduke John of Austria by the Regensburg botanist David Heinrich Hoppe in 1832, on the occasion of a failed attempt to advance into the area beyond the Riffltor (3,094 m). The Johannisberg has, seen from the east, a firn-capped dome shape, its western side consists of a mighty, 450 metre high and 50° inclined West Face. Long, prominent, knife-edge ridges radiate away from it to the northwest and southwest. The mountain is a popular destination for walkers and climbers due to its easy accessibility.

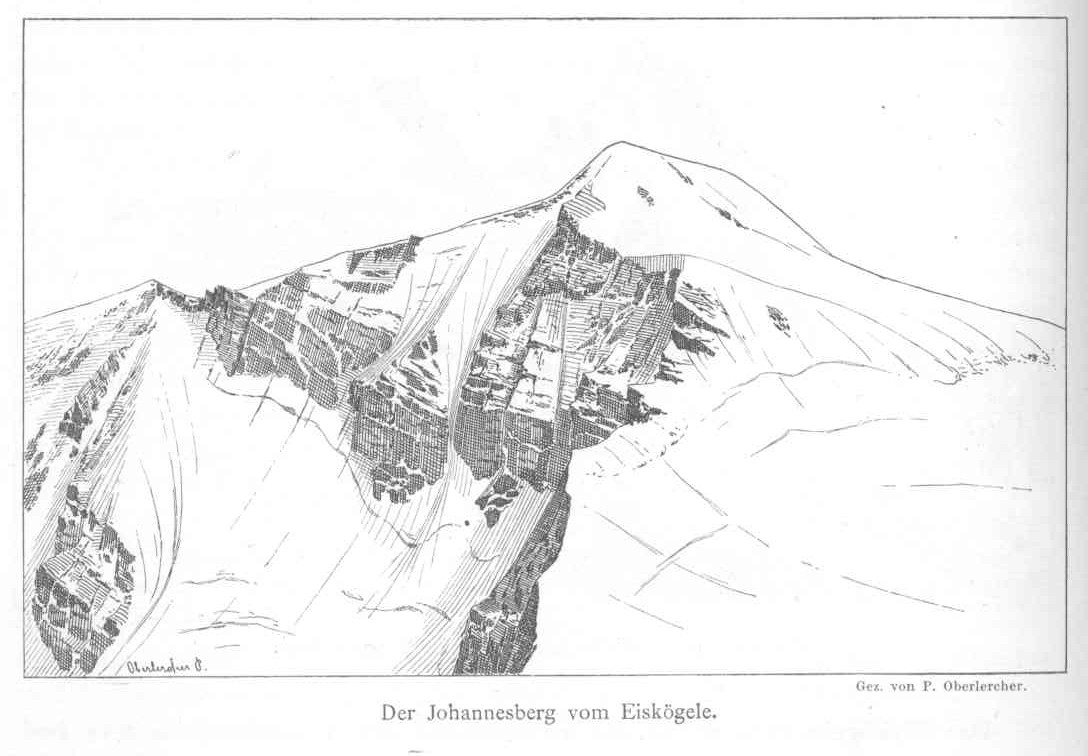
The Johannisberg seen from the Eiskögele (southwest)

== Sources and maps ==
- Willi End: Glocknergruppe Alpine Club Guide, Bergverlag Rother, Munich, 2003, ISBN 3-7633-1266-8
- Eduard Richter: Die Erschließung der Ostalpen, III. Band, Verlag des Deutschen und Oesterreichischen Alpenvereins, Berlin 1894
- Alpine Club map 1:25.000, Sheet 40, Glocknergruppe
