= Eiskögele =

- Location within Austria

Highest point
- Elevation: 3,426 m (AA) (11,240 ft)
- Coordinates: 47°05′59″N 12°39′22″E

Geography
- Location: border between Carinthia, Salzburg and East Tyrol, Austria
- Parent range: Austrian Central Alps, High Tauern, Glockner Group

Climbing
- First ascent: 30 July 1872 by B. Lergetporer from Schwaz and the mountain guides, Michel Groder and Josef Kerer.
- Easiest route: from the Oberwalder Hut over the Pasterze, the Lower Ödenwinkelscharte and the northeast ridge to the summit; moderately difficult climbing

The Eiskögele is a 3,426-metre-high (11,240 ft) mountain in the Glockner Group in the western part of the main Tauern chain, a range of the Austrian Central Alps. It lies right on the border between the Austrian states of Salzburg, Carinthia and East Tyrol and thus forms a tripoint. The mountain has the shape of an ice-covered horn with a mighty North Face, a prominent Northeast Ridge (Nordostgrat) and a sharp firn edge (Firnschneide) to the west. From its base, the Oberwalder Hut, it is easy to reach via the Pasterzeboden glacier. It was first climbed on 30 July 1872 by the tourist B. Lergetporer from Schwaz and mountain guides, Michel Groder and Josef Kerer. The first solo ascent of the mountain was achieved in August 1891 by Ludwig Kohn from Vienna as part of a crossing from the Schneewinkelkopf.

== Sources and maps ==
- Willi End: Alpine Club Guide Glocknergruppe, Bergverlag Rother, Munich, 2003, ISBN 3-7633-1266-8
- Eduard Richter: Die Erschließung der Ostalpen, III. Band, Verlag des Deutschen und Oesterreichischen Alpenvereins, Berlin 1894
- Alpine Club map 1:25.000, Sheet 40, Glocknergruppe
