= Karl-Heinz Hoffmann =

Karl-Heinz Hoffmann may refer to:

- Heinz Hoffmann or Karl-Heinz Hoffmann (1910–1985), German general
- Karl-Heinz Hoffmann (politician) (born 1928), German Christian Democratic Union politician

== See also ==
- Karl Hoffmann (disambiguation)
