= Hohe Tauern National Park =

National park in Austria

- IUCN category II (national park)
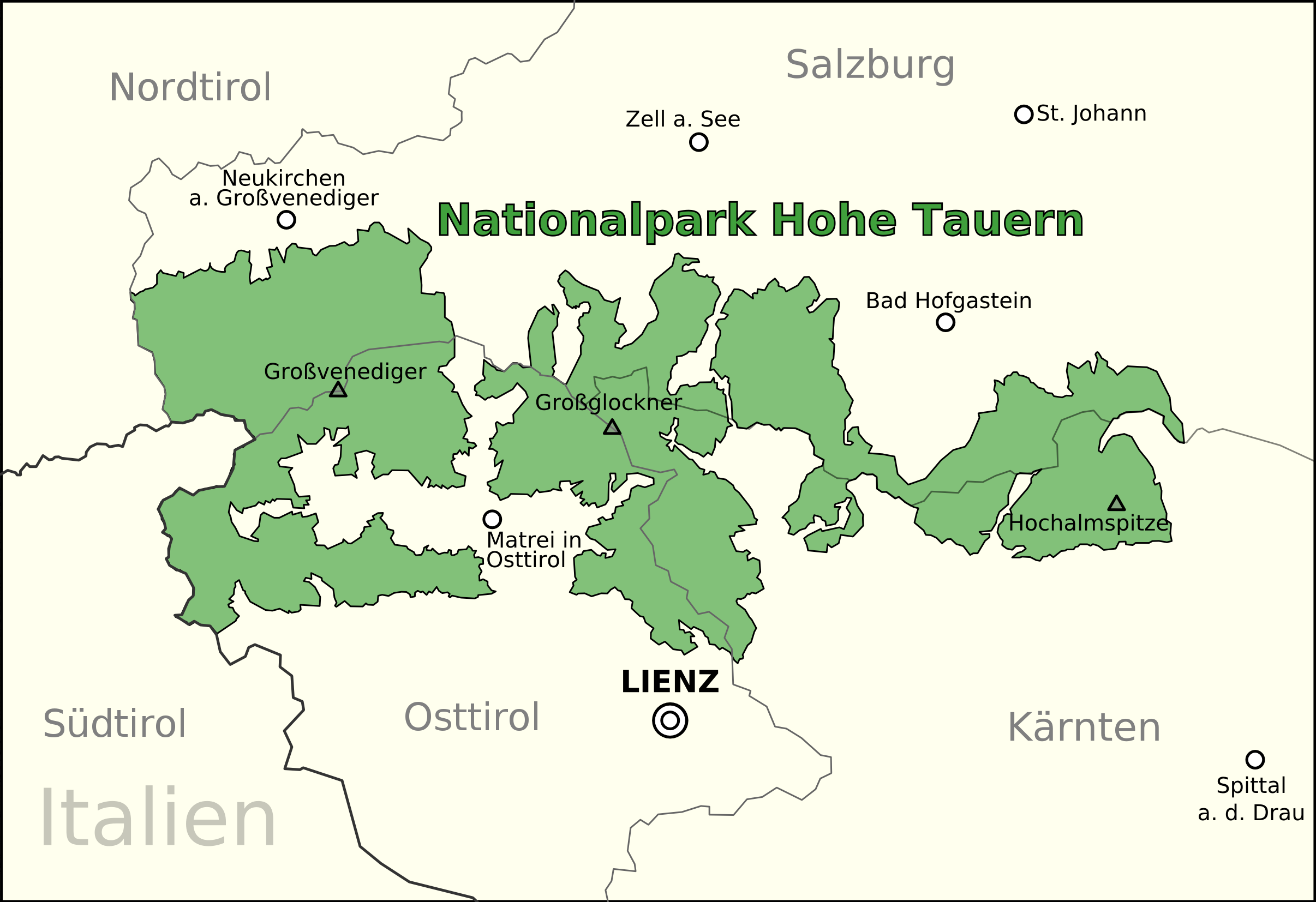
- Map of Hohe Tauern National Park

- Location within Austria
- Interactive map of Hohe Tauern National Park
- Coordinates: 47°5′58″N 12°39′25″E
- Area: 1,856 square kilometres (458,627.6 acres)
- Established: 1981

Hohe Tauern National Park (German: Nationalpark Hohe Tauern) is a national park in Austria. It stretches for 100 kilometres (62 mi) along the Hohe Tauern mountain range and is owned by the Austrian Alpine Club. With an area of about 1,834 square kilometres (708 sq mi), it is by far the largest of Austria's seven national parks as well as the largest nature reserve in the Alps. It is divided into a core zone of 1,198 square kilometres (463 sq mi) including the Grossglockner and Grossvenediger massifs, with complete prohibition of agricultural use, and a fringe zone of 638 square kilometres (246 sq mi) used for forestry and alpine-meadow farming. Five special nature sanctuaries are protected from any human disturbance.

The park of the IUCN II category comprises the Pasterze and numerous further glaciers, the Krimml Waterfalls, several glacial valleys and alluvial fans, as well as extended tundra areas and forests.

== History ==
The park was established according to a 1971 declaration signed by the participating states at Heiligenblut, it nevertheless took until 1981, when the first parts around Großglockner and Hochschober in Carinthia were put under protection. The adjacent parts finally joined in 1992. Tourism has become less harmful to the environment. An emphasis is put on the protection and maintenance of traditional ways of life in the Alps.

== Flora and Fauna ==
Among the flora of the Alps, especially Swiss Pines grow along the tree line; above subshrub, mainly alpenrose but also the endemic Saxifraga rudolphiana, up to nival level at about 2,800 m (9,200 ft). The fauna includes chamois, Alpine ibex and red deer, as well as griffon vulture and the golden eagle. The formerly extinct bearded vulture and the Alpine marmot have been successfully reintroduced.

== Gallery ==
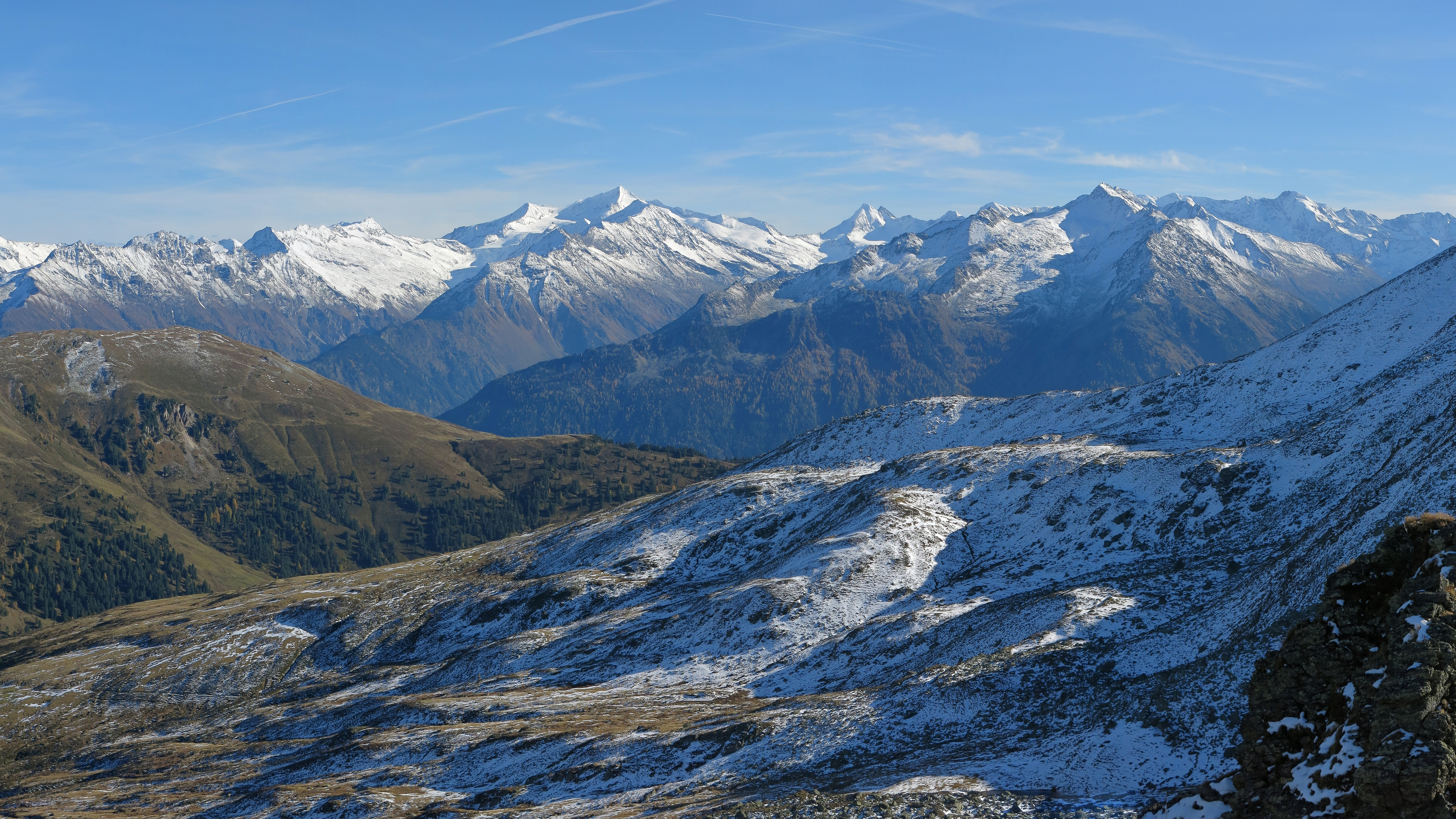
Panorama of the Venediger Group

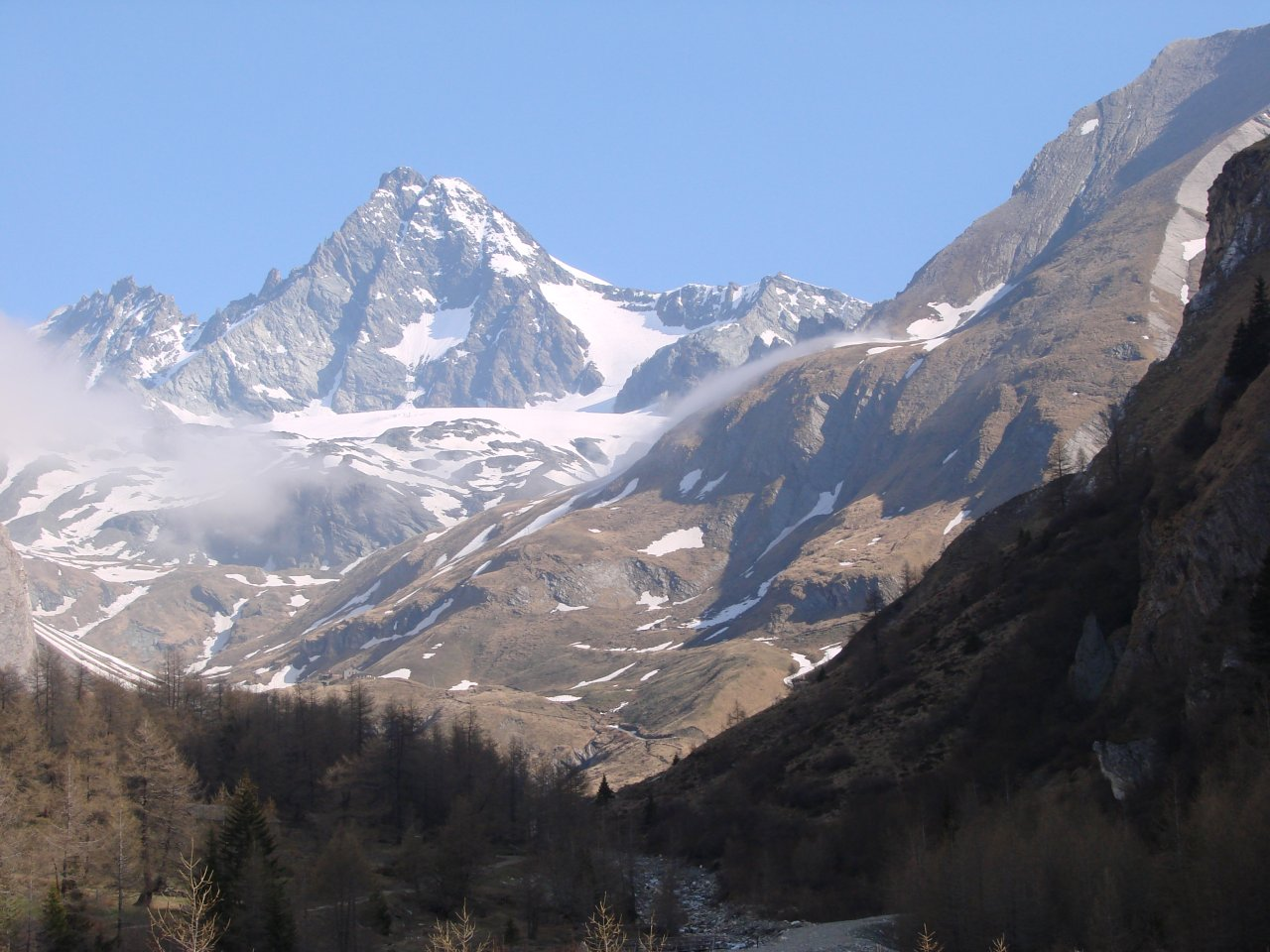
The Großglockner from the south
