= Hohe Dock =

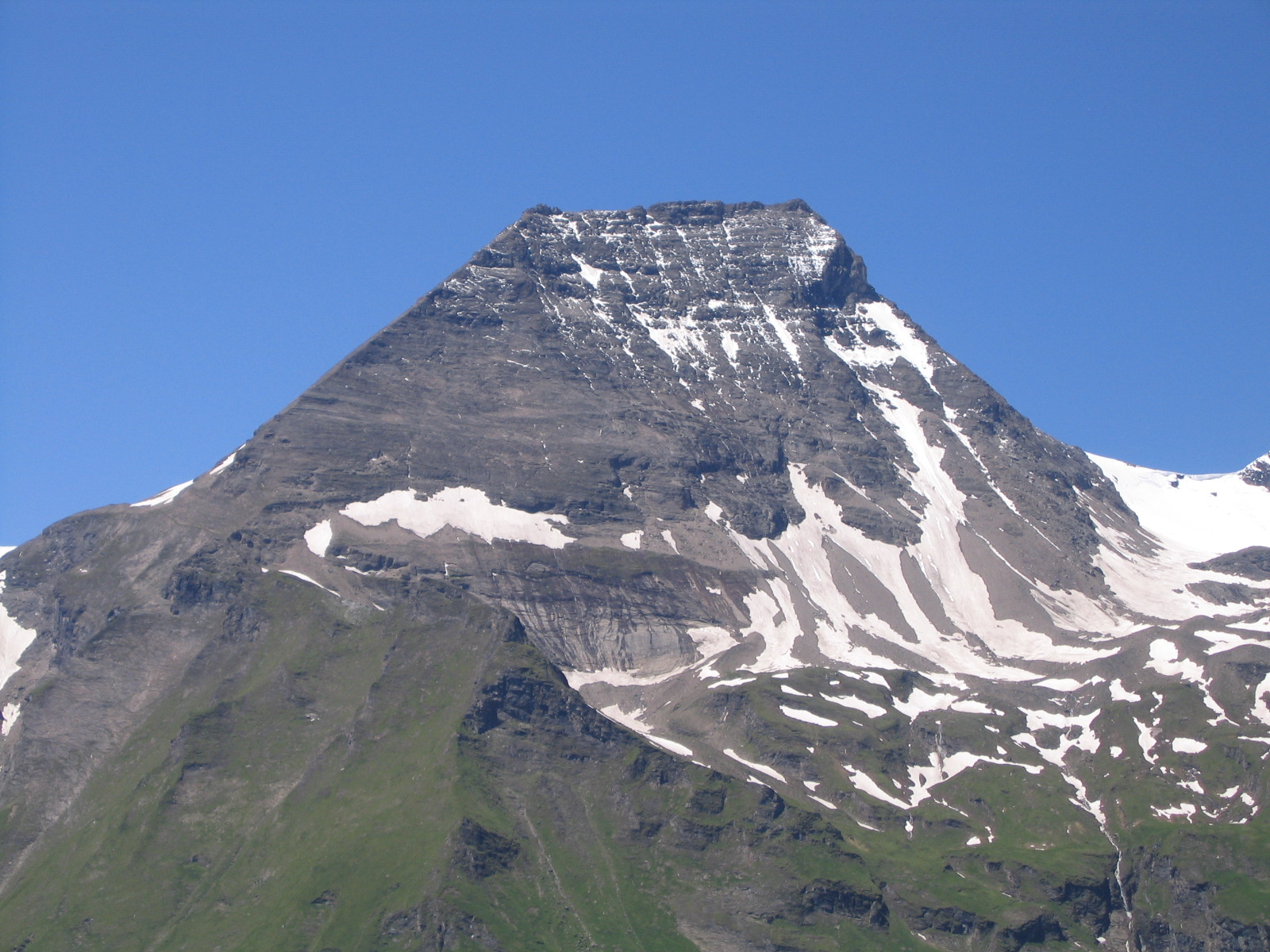
- Hohe Dock from the Großglockner High Alpine Road

Highest point
- Elevation: 3348 m AA
- Coordinates: 47°07′51″N 12°44′27″E

Geography
- Location within Austria
- Location: Salzburg, Austria
- Parent range: Glockner Group / High Tauern

Climbing
- First ascent: c. 1842 - 1845 G. Mayer (Badhans) during a hunt

The Hohe Dock lies in the Austrian federal state of Salzburg and, at 3,348 metres, is one of the highest peaks in the Glockner Group. The mountain, with its striking trapezoidal shape, dominates the orographically left-hand side of the valley of the Fuscher Ache and the panorama above the northern ramp of the Großglockner High Alpine Road.

Its secondary peak, the southeastern summit, reaches a height of 3,268 m above sea level (AA).

== Climbing route ==
The start point is the head of the valley at Fusch an der Großglocknerstraße (Ferleiten). The summit is ascended via the Schwarzenberg Hut (2,267 m) along a signed, high alpine path.

== Gallery ==
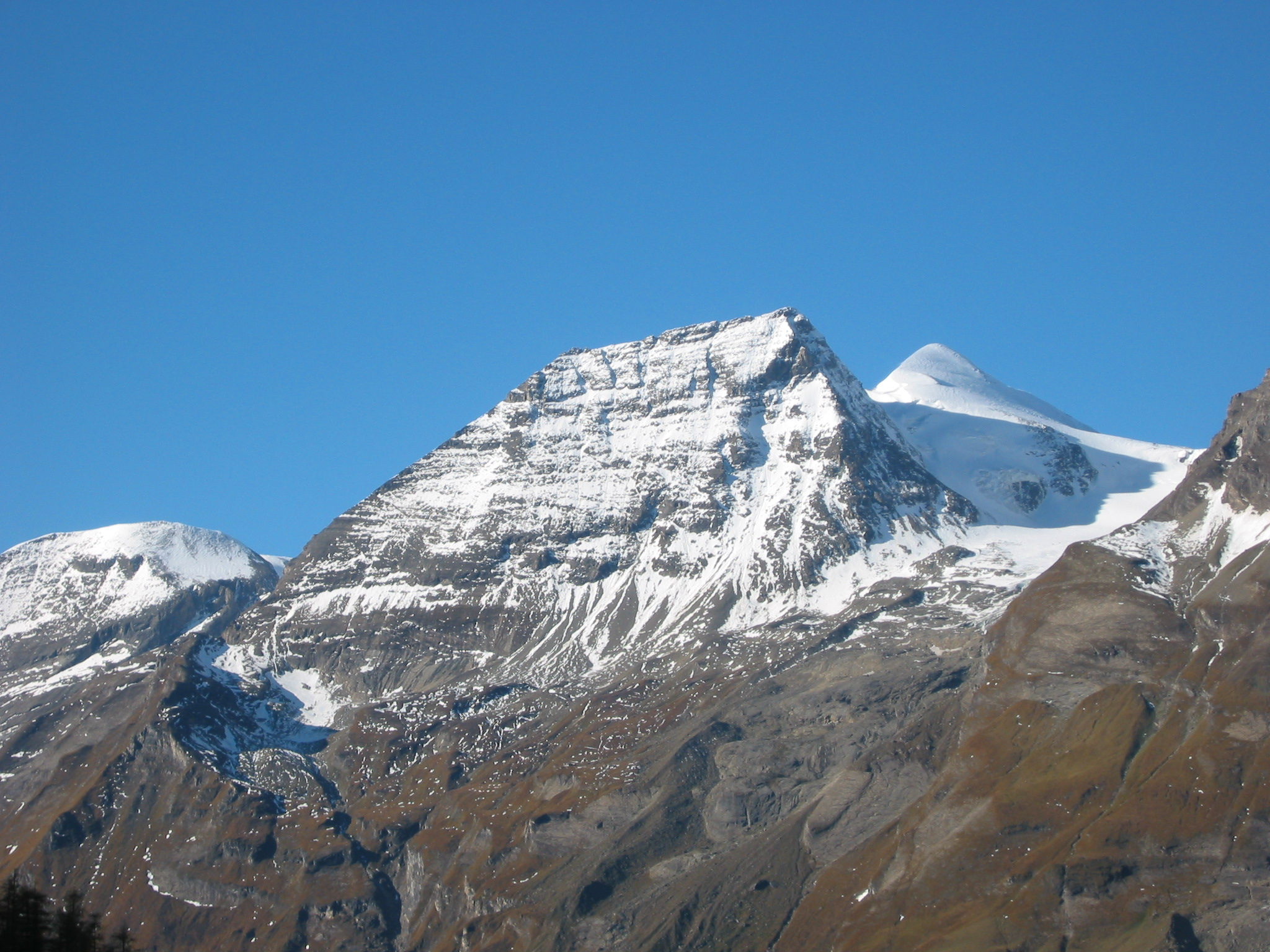
The Hohe Dock from the northeast
