= Heiligenblut am Großglockner =

- Municipality
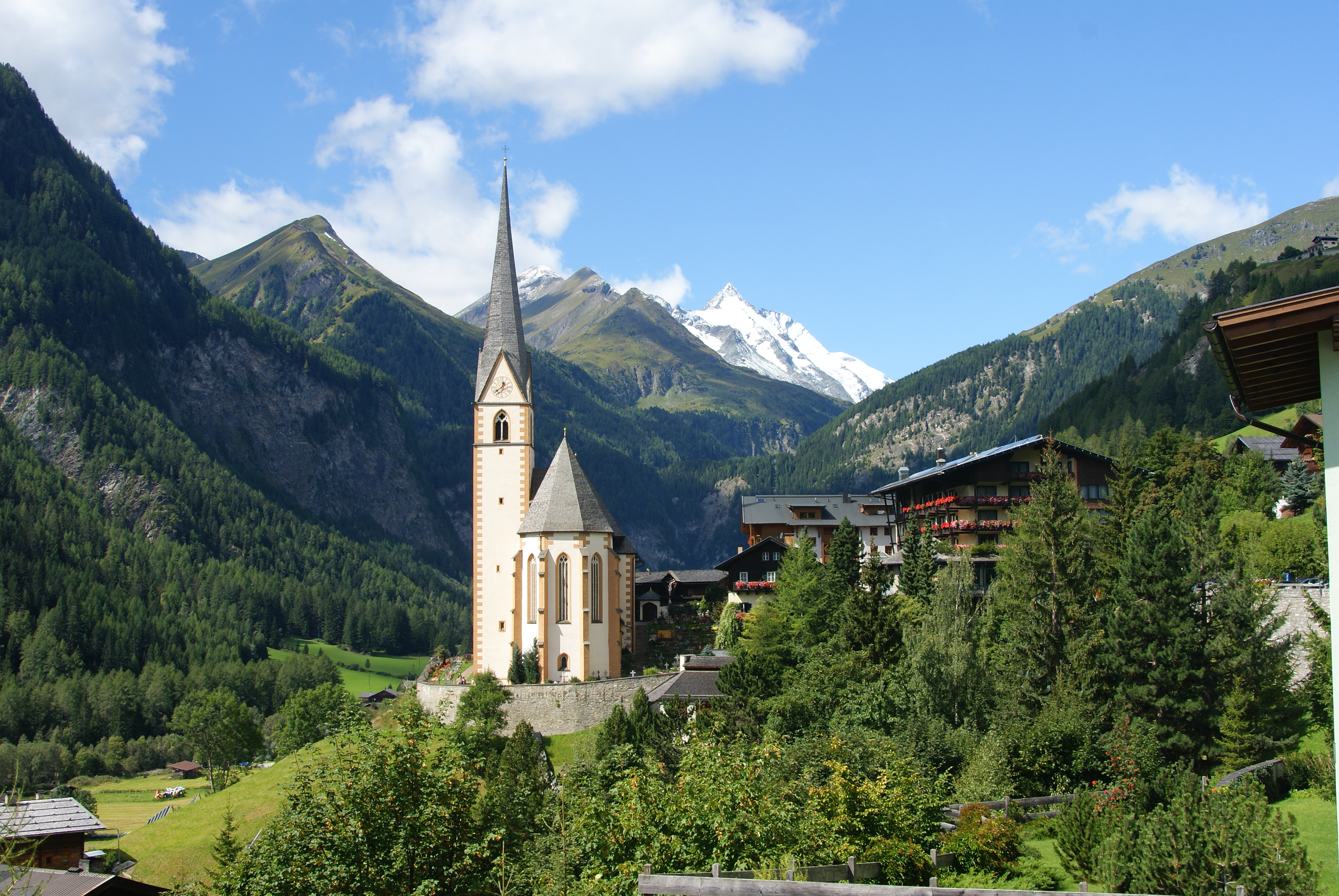
- View to St Vincent Church and Grossglockner massif

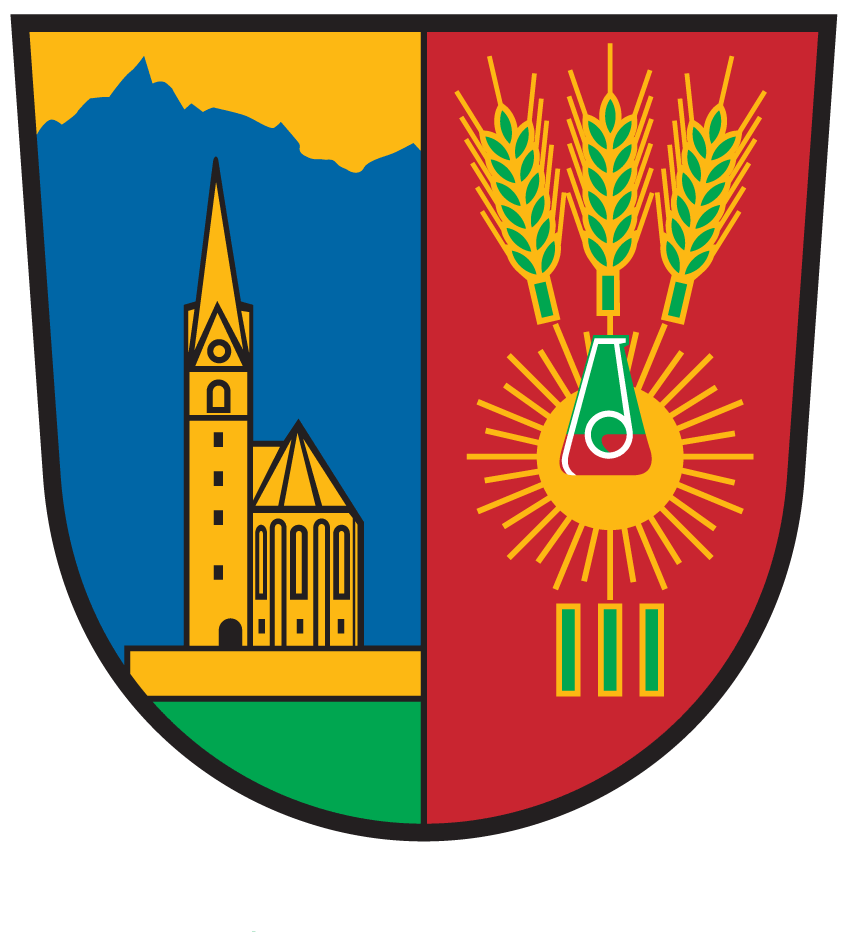
- Coat of arms

- Location within Austria
- Coordinates: 47°2′29″N 12°50′13″E
- Country: Austria
- State: Carinthia
- District: Spittal an der Drau

Government
  - Mayor: Martin Lackner (ÖVP)

Area
  - Total: 193.53 km^{2} (74.72 sq mi)
- Elevation: 1,288 m (4,226 ft)

Population (2018-01-01)
  - Total: 1,020
  - Density: 5.27/km^{2} (13.7/sq mi)
- Time zone: UTC+1 (CET)
  - Summer (DST): UTC+2 (CEST)
- Postal code: 9844
- Area code: 04824
- Vehicle registration: SP
- Website: www.heiligenblut.at

Heiligenblut am Großglockner (Slovene: Sveta Kri, English: Blood of the Holy) is a municipality in the district of Spittal an der Drau in Carinthia, Austria.

== Geography ==
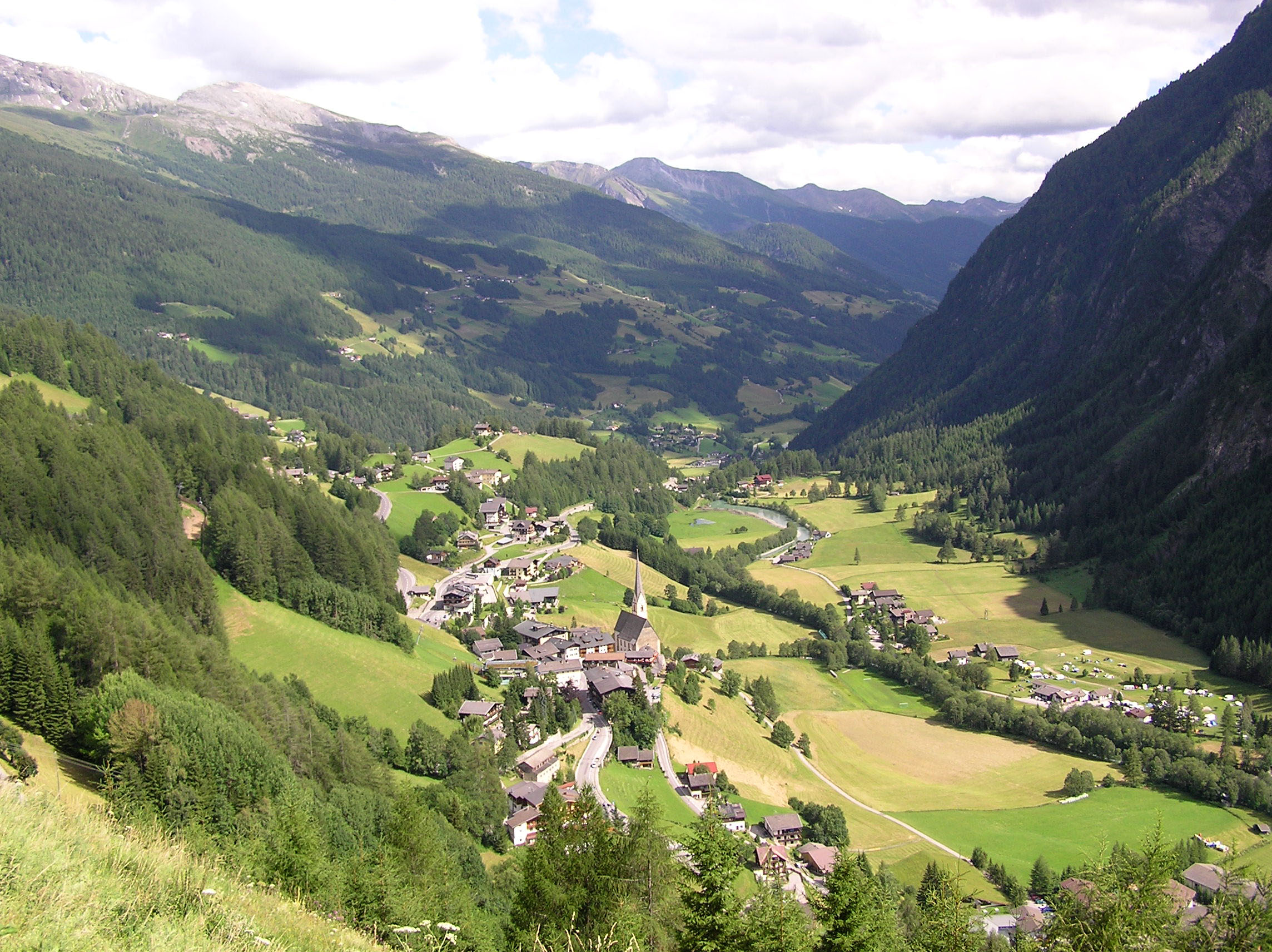
View from Glockner road

At the northwestern edge of Carinthia and bordering East Tyrol and the state of Salzburg state, Heiligenblut is located in a high valley of the High Tauern range within the Central Eastern Alps. It is situated at the foot of the Grossglockner, the highest mountain in Austria, and of the Pasterze Glacier. Neighbouring peaks include the Johannisberg and the Fuscherkarkopf in the north, both part of the Alpine divide marking the Carinthia-Salzburg border. The municipal area comprises the cadastral communities of Apriach, Rojach, and Zlapp und Hof.

The municipality is also the southern starting point of the scenic Grossglockner High Alpine Road to Bruck in the state of Salzburg, the former Hochtor Pass, today the continuation of the B107 highway from Lienz in East Tyrol. Nearby attractions include the Heiligenblut-Roßbach-Schareck cable car up to 2,606 m (8,550 ft), an open-air museum, the Stockmühlen mills in Apriach with nine flume mills, Lake Kachelsee to the west, the Möll, Gößnitz and Leiter waterfalls, the Margaritzen reservoir, and Lake Sandersee.

The construction of the nearby railway tunnel to the Fleißalm mountain area at 1,798 m (5,899 ft) is unique in Europe. The 1.6-kilometre-long (1 mi) tunnel is filled with water during the summer but serves as a railway tunnel leading to the Fleißalm winter sports region in winter.

== History ==
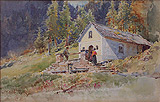
Briccius chapel, painting by E.T. Compton

A chapel at Heiligenblut in the Duchy of Carinthia was first mentioned in 1271, containing a relic of the Blood of Christ. According to legend, a flask of the Holy Blood, which is today kept in a sacrament house, was brought here in 914 AD from the Hagia Sophia in Constantinople by a Danish knight called Briccius (Frederick, not to be confused with Saint Brice), once in the service of Emperor Constantine VII. On his way home across the Alps, he was buried by an avalanche and in the face of death hid the relic in an open wound at his calf. His corpse was later found by local peasants at a place where three ears of wheat broke through the snow—as rendered in the Heiligenblut coat of arms.

The Gothic pilgrimage church dedicated to Saint Vincent of Saragossa, with its prominent spire, was built between 1460 and 1491. The church also houses a late-Gothic winged altarpiece from 1520, and a crypt and tomb containing Briccius' mortal remains.

A transhumance agricultural as well as a gold mining from ancient history to the Middle Ages, Heiligenblut was a stop on the bridle path and later Roman road leading to the Hochtor Pass across the Alps, probably already in use during the Hallstatt culture which followed on from the Late Bronze Age. In 1834 Archduke John of Austria had a first mountain hut built beneath the pass, and a driveway was constructed from 1875. The opening of the Grossglockner Road in 1935 decisively promoted the economy of Heiligenblut as a tourism and mountaineering resort.

== Politics ==
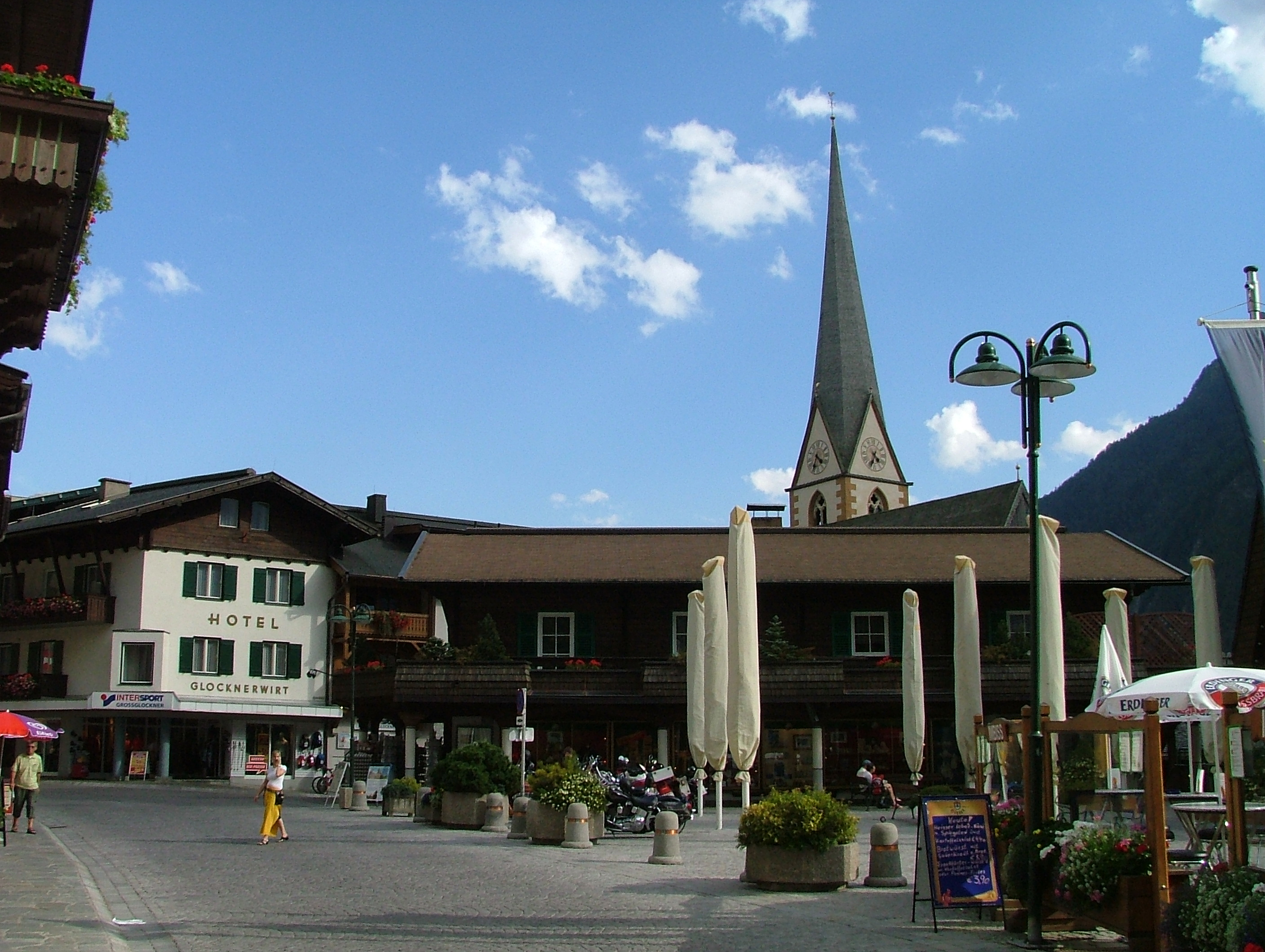
Main square

The municipal council (Gemeinderat) consists of 15 members. Following the 2021 Carinthian Local Elections, the seat distribution is as follows:

- Austrian People's Party (ÖVP): 12 seats
- Independent Heiligenblut' list (HBL): 3 seats

The mayor of Heiligenblut am Großglockner, Martin Lackner (HBL), was elected in 2021.

=== Twin towns — sister cities ===
Heiligenblut is twinned with:

- Sodankylä, Finland
- Julian, California, United States

== Literature ==
Kaufmann, J.: Örtliche Entwicklung und Ortsbild der Gemeinde Heiligenblut am Großglockner (master's thesis), Vienna, 1984.
