= Karl Hoffmann =

Karl Hoffmann may refer to:

- Karl Hoffmann (architect) (1883–1951), German architect
- Karl Hoffmann (politician) (1820–1895), declined election to the Swiss Federal Council in 1881
- Karl Hoffmann (naturalist) (1823–1859), German physician and naturalist
- Karl Hoffmann (linguist) (1915–1996), German linguist
- Karl Hoffmann (rower) (born 1906), German Olympic rower
- Karl Hoffmann (footballer) (1935–2020), German footballer
- Karl W. Hofmann (born 1961), former United States Ambassador to Togo

== See also ==
- Carl Hoffman (born 1960), American travel and fiction writer
- Carl Henry Hoffman (1896–1980), U.S. Representative from Pennsylvania
- Carl Hoffmann (1885–1947), German cinematographer and film director
- Karl-Heinz Hoffmann (disambiguation)
