= Fusch an der Großglocknerstraße =

- Municipality
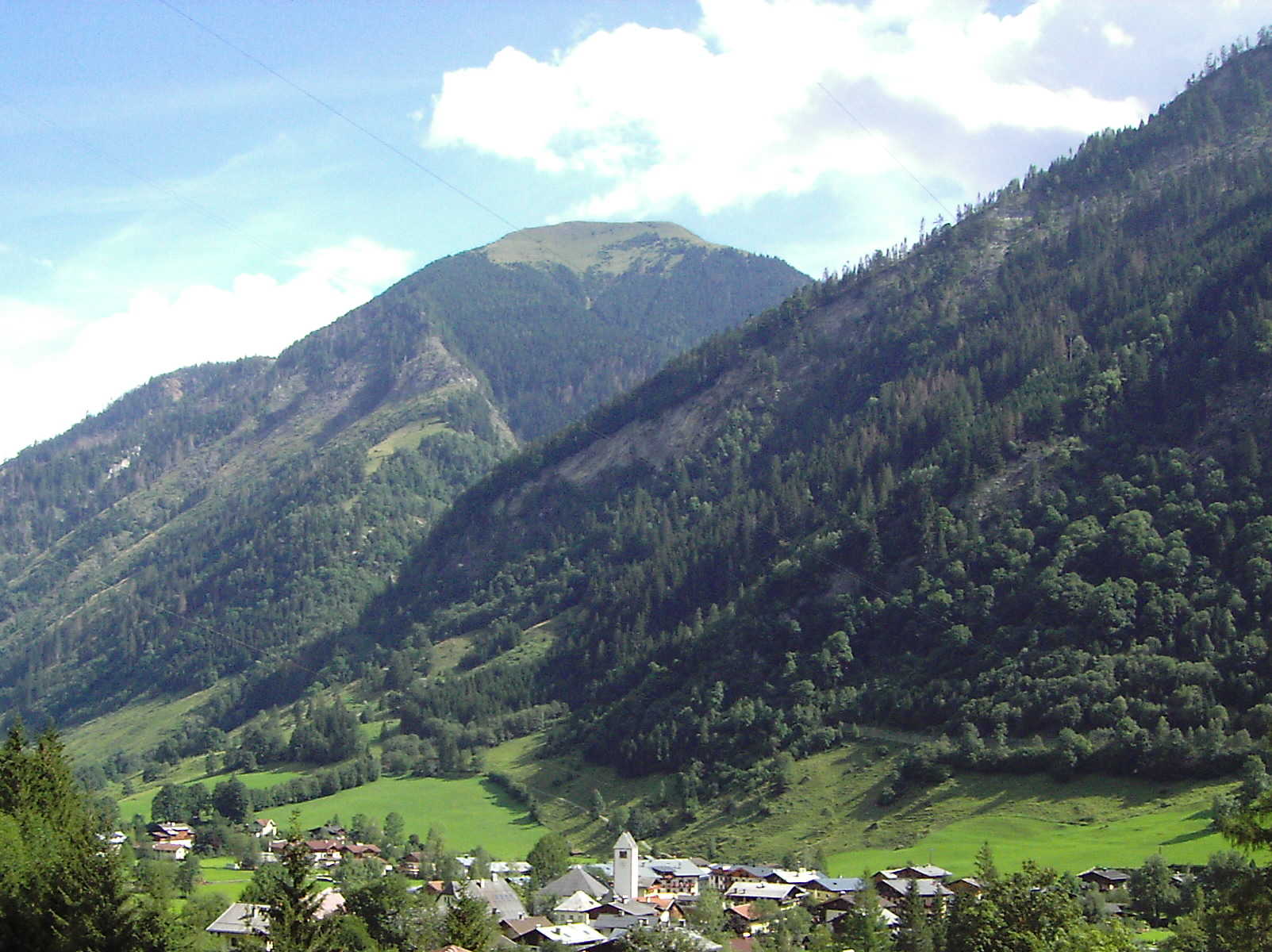

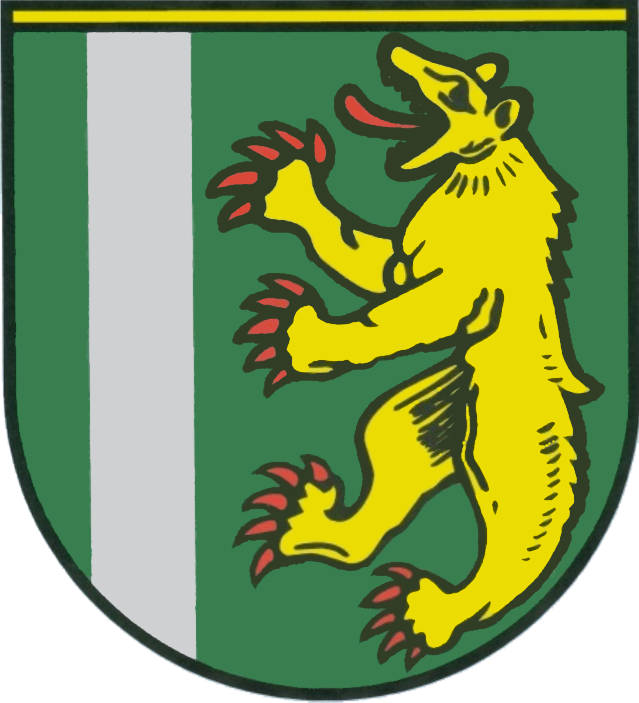
- Coat of arms

- Location within Zell am See district

- Location within Austria
- Coordinates: 47°13′0″N 12°49′0″E
- Country: Austria
- State: Salzburg
- District: Zell am See

Government
  - Mayor: Hannes Schernthaner (ÖVP)

Area
  - Total: 158.14 km^{2} (61.06 sq mi)
- Elevation: 813 m (2,667 ft)

Population (2018-01-01)
  - Total: 719
  - Density: 4.55/km^{2} (11.8/sq mi)
- Time zone: UTC+1 (CET)
  - Summer (DST): UTC+2 (CEST)
- Postal code: 5672
- Area code: 06546
- Vehicle registration: ZE
- Website: www.fusch.at

Fusch an der Großglocknerstraße is a municipality, at the foot of Grossglockner mountain, in the district of Zell am See (Pinzgau region), in the state of Salzburg in Austria. The Fusch valley lies north of the main chain of the Alps. The population (as of December 2008) is 697. Fusch has an elevation of 813 metres (2,667 ft), but the maximum elevation within the municipality is 3,564 metres (11,693 ft), rising up Grossglockner mountain (Austria's highest mountain).

== Geography ==
The Fusch valley lies north of the Alps between Rauris valley and Kaprun valley and flows into the Salzach Valley.

Through the Fusch valley and situated in the valley, at Ferleiten (also belongs to Fusch), the Grossglockner High Alpine Road leads as a well-known scenic road and popular destination.

From the main Alpine ridge, the Fuscher Ache river winds, starting from the upper section of the Fusch valley - the Kafertal - by Ferleiten across the Fusch district until it flows into the Salzach at Bruck an der Großglocknerstraße.

In a section of the Fusch valley is found at 1,188 metres (3,898 ft) Bad Fusch, a high-altitude resort, known during the 18th and 19th centuries under the name of St. Wolfgang, which is in ruins today, used only as a leisure destination. Here there are numerous sources, which are said to give partial healing. The Prince Bishop Cardinal Schwarzenberg, who was here in 1829 for the first time, sponsored a resort in the 19th century, of the most famous mountain resorts in Austria and could measure up to Bad Gastein. However, the place, in consequence of the bankruptcy of the only remaining large hotels, fell into disrepair after 1945 and today consists of nothing but ruins and a restored church in the nineties again.

Large sections of the valley are part of the Hohe Tauern National Park and are subject to particularly strict conservation conditions.

== History ==
The Fusch valley forms the northern end of the old mountain pass over the Alps, which was already used in Celtic times as a mule trail. Near the Hochtor, Celtic and Roman coins have been found, and the highest European sanctuary with a small statue of Hercules. Whether, during this time, it was already a town in the valley is not documented, but it had at least accommodation for traders, who crossed the Hochtor at the Central Alps, probably. In Fusch itself are vaulted remains from the Middle Ages. With the medieval mining, a greater number of miners would have arrived in the valley. The main settlement in the valley, however, was the latest since the early modern period, St. Wolfgang, named "Bad Fusch" later, before the start of health tourism or of silver mining on Kühkarkopf mountain. The current village was inhabited at that time and still likely to have been partially uninhabitable marshland. The town itself was divided by the river for a long time between Taxenbach and Zell administrative areas, which is reflected today in building up numbers with the letter "Z" (for Fusch Zeller) and "T" (for Taxenbacher Fusch). As an independent community, the town was ruled almost continuously (with the exception of the Nazi period) by Christian and conservative mayors. The town, formerly isolated, greatly benefited economically by the construction of the Grossglockner High Alpine road, but outside the summer months, is still off the main tourist routes.

In the long peasant society - as in other rural regions of Austria - during the 2nd World War, forced laborers from Eastern Europe were used by farmers. At the end of the war, several Nazi war criminals sought refuge in the village as part of the Alpine Redoubt. From 1945 to 1955, the city belonged to the U.S. occupation zone. The growth of tourism, since the 1960s, brought the city a certain prosperity, but which cannot compete with the big tourist centers in the region and thus saved the city defense works well with big ski areas. As in many rural regions of Austria since the 1990s, one can notice a certain deterioration of the countryside infrastructure with the closure of shops, post offices and police stations. At the same time, the Hohe Tauern National Park and a small associated exhibition or the conversion of Mühlauersäge in a show sawmill have provided the first impulses for an ecologically and culturally interested tourism.

== Politics ==
The local council of Fusch an der Großglocknerstraße has 9 members and, since the Municipal Election 2014, is as follows:

5 ÖVP
2 FPÖ
2 SPÖ

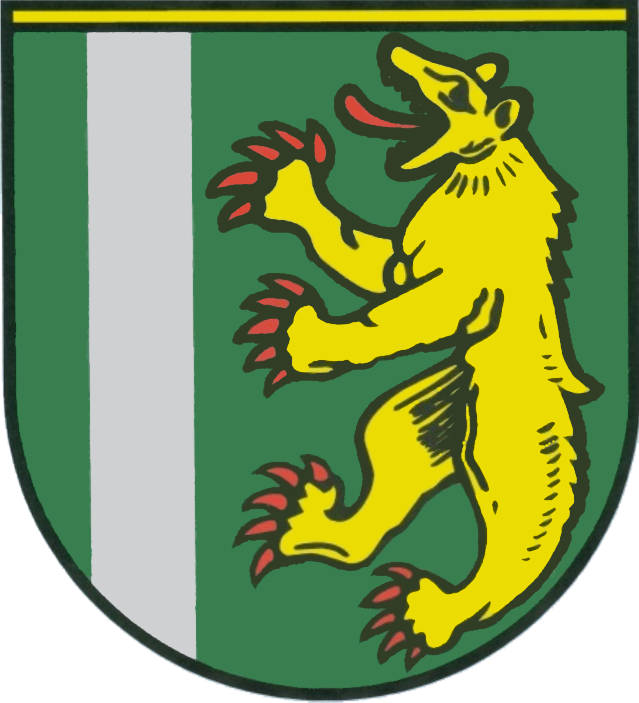

The directly elected mayor is Hannes Schernthaner (ÖVP).

== Coat of arms ==
The arms of the municipality is: "In a green sign is a silvery pylon on the left, next to the red-clawed Golden Bear."

== Gallery ==
Fuscher Ache river (view to south)	Midtown with typical houses	Wildpark Ferleiten (of Fusch)
