= Pasterze Glacier =

Glacier in Carinthia, Austria

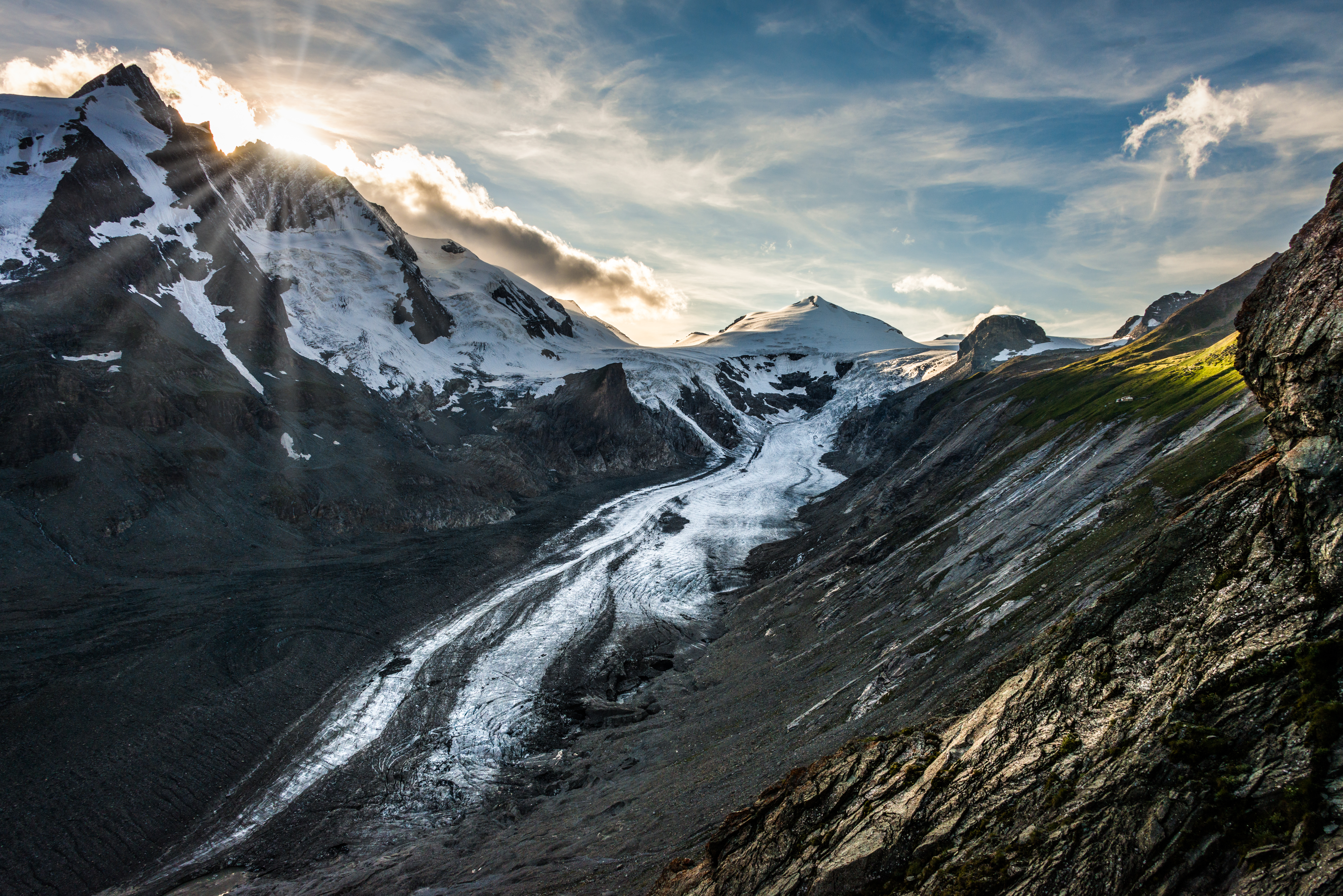
- Pasterze with Grossglockner massif (left) and Johannisberg peak in 2014
- Interactive map of Pasterze Glacier
- Type: Mountain glacier
- Location: Grossglockner, Austria
- Coordinates: 47°5′8″N 12°43′24″E
- Area: 18.5 km^{2} (7.1 mi^{2}) (2006)
- Length: 8.3 km (5.2 mi) (2006)
- Thickness: about 120 m (400 ft)
- Highest elevation: 3,453 m (11,329 ft)
- Lowest elevation: 2,100 m (6,900 ft)
- Terminus: Talus
- Status: Retreating

The Pasterze, at approximately 8.4 kilometres (5.2 mi) in length, is the longest glacier in Austria and in the Eastern Alps. It lies within the Glockner Group of the High Tauern mountain range in Carinthia, directly beneath Austria's highest mountain, the Grossglockner.

== Geography ==
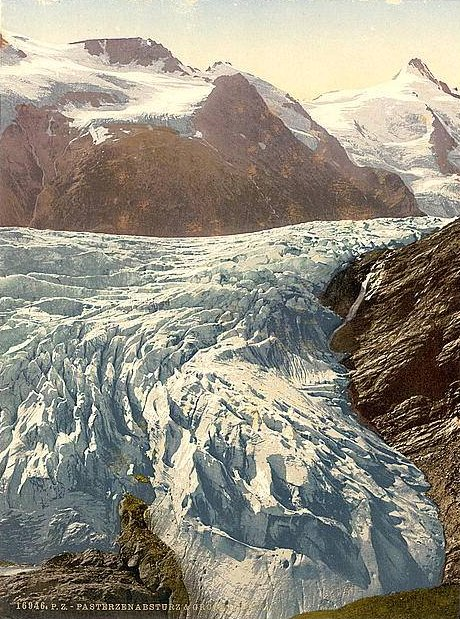
Pasterze and Grossglockner massif, 1900 postcard

The glacier reaches from its head, the Johannisberg peak at 3,453-metre (11,329 ft), to 2,100 metres (6,900 ft) above sea level (m AA). The Pasterze forms the source region of the Möll river, a left tributary of the Drava. Its waters also feed the Margaritze reservoir, used to generate electricity at the Kaprun hydropower plant north of the Alpine crest.

The name Pasterze is possibly derived from Slovene: pasti, "pasture". Indeed the detection of wood, peat and pollen in the area of the retreating glacier indicate vegetation and also the use as pastureland during the last interglacial period until about 1,500 BC.

The surrounding area was purchased by the German and Austrian Alpine Club in 1918; today the glacier is part of the High Tauern National Park. The Pasterze is a major tourist destination, accessible via the scenic Grossglockner High Alpine Road and a funicular railway that leads down to its margin. Since its opening in 1963, the edge of the glacier has retracted about 300 m (980 ft) from the lower station.

As of 2025, recent measurements by GeoSphere Austria indicate that the Pasterze has lost 2 meters of ice thickness each year since 2022. The tongue, stretching 2,100 meters above sea level, is currently shrinking at a rate of 5 meters annually, and up to 10 meters in its lower parts.

== See also ==
- List of glaciers
- Retreat of glaciers since 1850
- Effects of global warming
