= Grossglockner High Alpine Road =

Mountain pass in Austria

Grossglockner High Alpine Road Hochtor Pass
- Großglockner Hochalpenstraße; Glocknerstraße
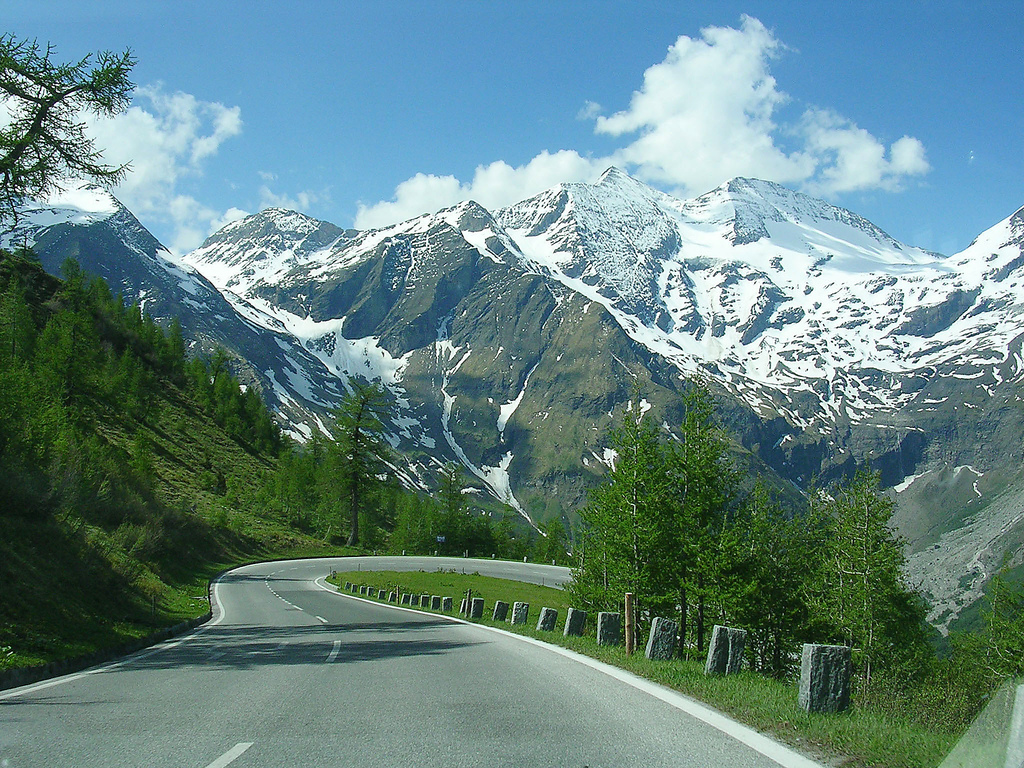

- Location within Alps
- Elevation: 2,504 m (8,215 ft)
- Traversed by: Road/tunnel

Third Approach
- Location: Austria
- Range: Hohe Tauern
- Coordinates: 47°05′00″N 12°50′34″E

The Grossglockner High Alpine Road (in German Großglockner Hochalpenstraße) is the highest surfaced mountain pass road in Austria. It connects Bruck in the state of Salzburg with Heiligenblut in Carinthia via the Fuscher Törl at 2,428 m (7,966 ft) and the Hochtor Pass at 2,504 m (8,215 ft). The road is named after the Grossglockner, Austria's highest mountain. Built as a scenic route, a toll is charged.

== Course ==
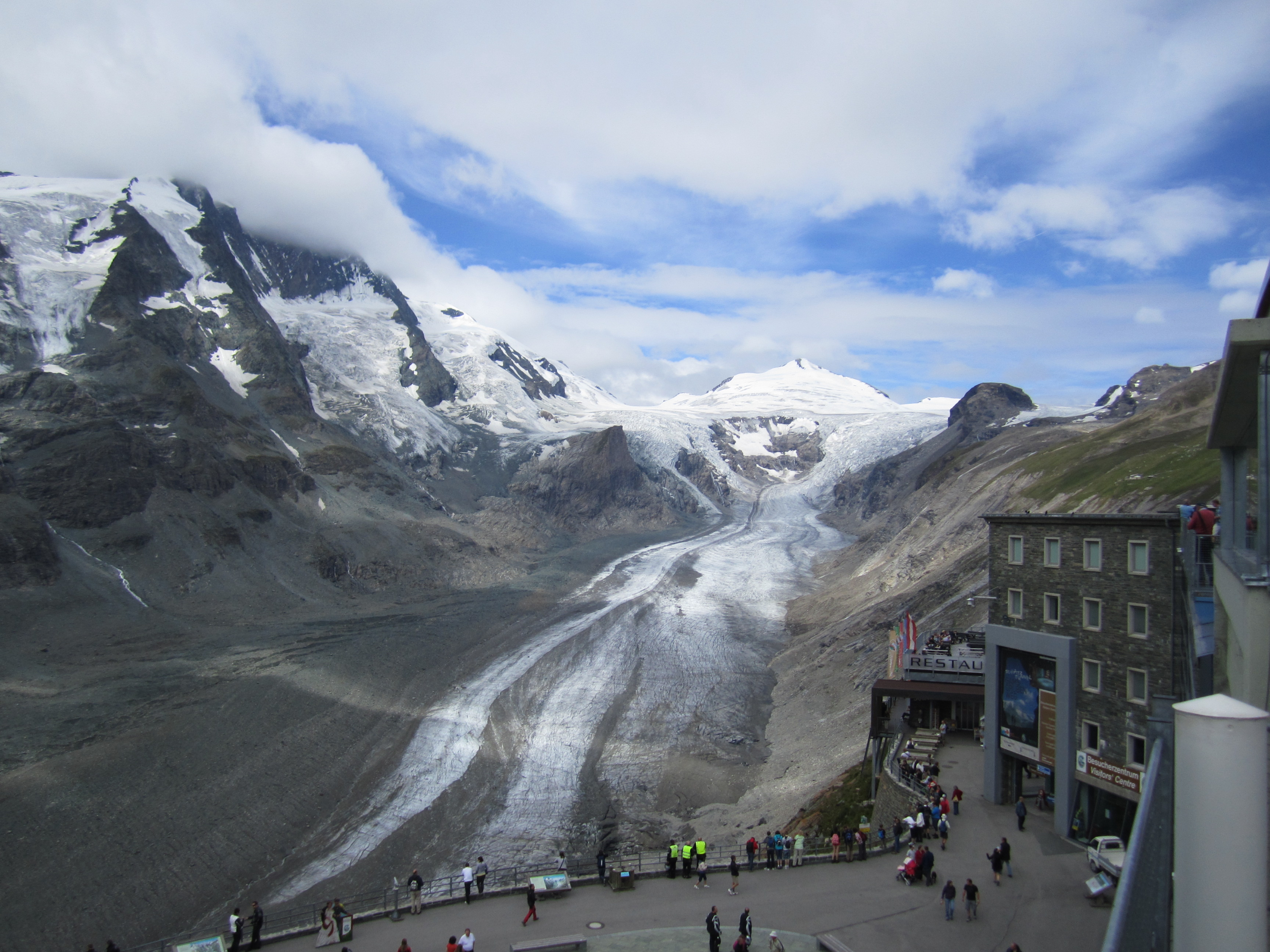
Kaiser-Franz-Josefs-Höhe

The road leads from Bruck in the Salzach Valley via the northern toll booth at Ferleiten (near Fusch) with numbered hairpin curves up to Hochtor Pass, with a 1.5 km (0.93 mi) branch-off from Fuscher Törl at 2,428 m (7,966 ft) to the Edelweißspitze viewpoint at 2,571 m (8,435 ft). The scenic route crosses the Alpine divide in a tunnel and runs southwards passing another branch-off which leads to the Glocknerhaus mountain hut and the Kaiser-Franz-Josefs-Höhe visitors' centre at 2,369 m (7,772 ft).

The popular overlook was named after a visit by Emperor Franz Joseph I of Austria and his consort Elisabeth in 1856. It offers a panoramic view over the Pasterze Glacier, the Grossglockner massif, the Glocknerwand, and the Johannisberg in the northwest. From here, the road runs downhill to the southern toll booth near Heiligenblut.

== History ==
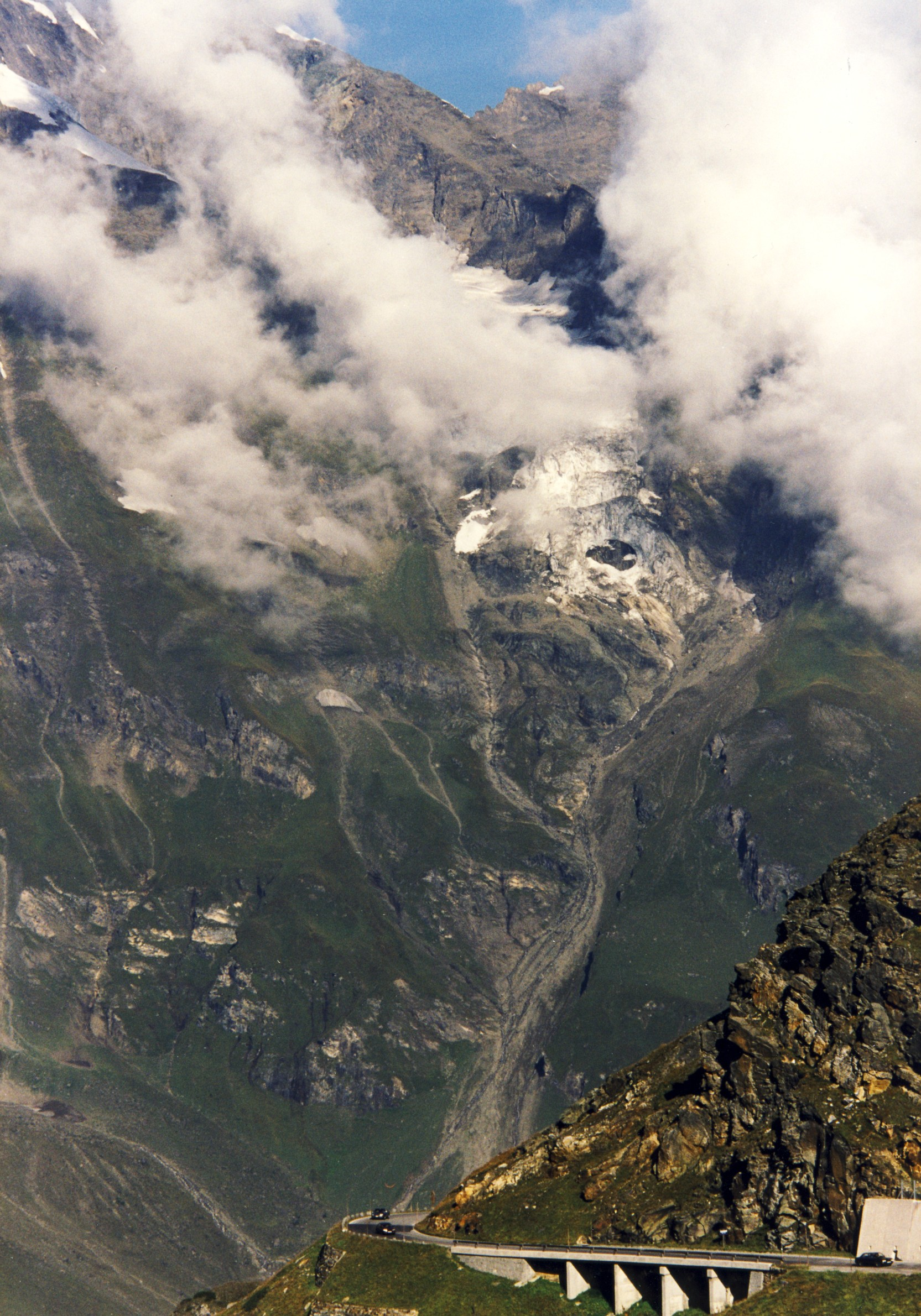
Grossglockner High Alpine Road in autumn 1997

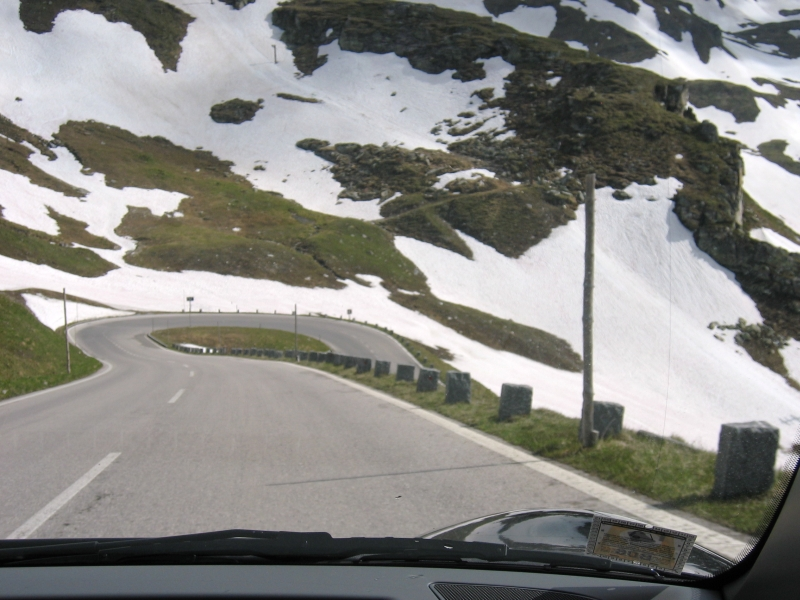
Hairpin turn near the summit

When, in 1924, a group of Austrian experts presented a plan for a road over the Hochtor (the high pass), they were ridiculed in a time when in Austria, Germany, and Italy there were only 154,000 private automobiles, 92,000 motorcycles, and 2,000 kilometres (1,200 mi) of long-distance asphalt roads. Austria had suffered catastrophic economic consequences from losing the First World War, had shrunk to a seventh of its imperial size, lost its international markets, and suffered devastating inflation.

Even the modest design of a 3-metre (9.8 ft) gravel road, with overtaking points, appeared too expensive. The impulse to build a road, intended to open the barren alpine valleys to motorized tourism, was sparked by the New York stock market slump in 1929. This catastrophe shook an impoverished Austria with terrible force.

Within three years, the economic output dropped by a quarter, and the unemployment rate reached 26%. The government then revived the Grossglockner project to create jobs for 3,200 (from an average of 520,000 jobless). The project was extended to a width of 6 metres (20 ft) to serve the needs of the "excessive international traffic" – which was roundly mocked – in the belief that an annual 120,000 visitors would come. The State advanced the building costs, and the users were to pay off this sum with a toll fee for usage.

On 30 August 1930 at 9:30 am, the first explosives roared in Ferleiten. Four years later, the moving force of the road building, the Salzburg provincial head of government Franz Rehrl, and the technician Franz Wallack climbed into their Steyr 100 car, and achieved the first alpine crossing in an automobile on a graded road.

A year later, on 3 August 1935, the Grossglockner High Alpine Road was opened and put into full service the following day with an international automobile and motorcycle race.

Including the building of the access roads, the Glockner Road cost Austrian schilling 910 million (at 1990 rates), around seven million less than estimated.

Planners had reckoned on 120,000 visitors in 1930, but the road's appeal to tourists in 1938 drew 375,000 visitors in 98,000 vehicles. After the Second World War, it took until 1952 for the pre-war record to be surpassed, with 412,000 visitors and 91,000 vehicles. In 1962, 360,000 vehicles and 1.3 million visitors crossed the pass.

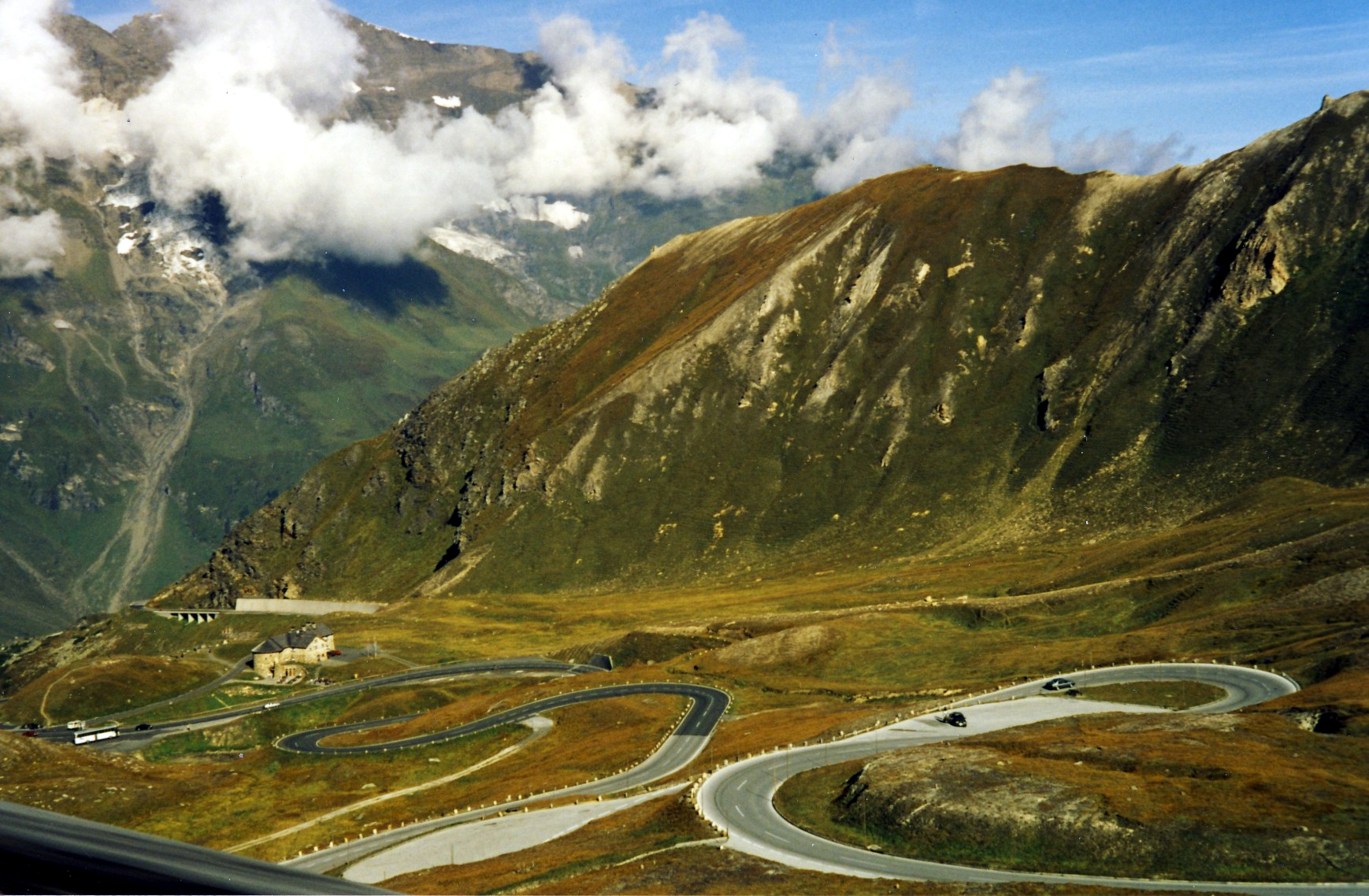
Serpentine curves (Wilfried-Haslauer-Haus)

The opening of the Felbertauern Road (1967) and the Tauern Motorway (1975) throttled traffic by nearly 15 per cent, but it also permanently changed the character of the Großglockner High Alpine Road: from the only transalpine road over the 158-kilometre (98 mi) main alpine crest between the Brenner Pass and the Katschberg Pass, to an excursion road from a catchment area with a radius of around 130 kilometres (81 mi).

The Glockner Road also reflects the material advance of the people: in the early years, the motorcycle – as the poor man's car – accounted for up to a quarter of the traffic; 1955 was the high point with 47,500 motorcycles (26% of the traffic); in 1968, only 2,071 motorcycles were to be counted. The number of motorcycles on the Grossglockner High Alpine Road then rose by 2003 to over 76,000.

Increasing numbers of visitors made the stage-by-stage modernization of the road necessary after 1953 to a width of 7.5 metres (25 ft), to 15 metres (49 ft) in place of 10-metre (33 ft) bend radius, and 4,000 parking places instead of 800 and an annual capacity of up to 350,000 vehicles.

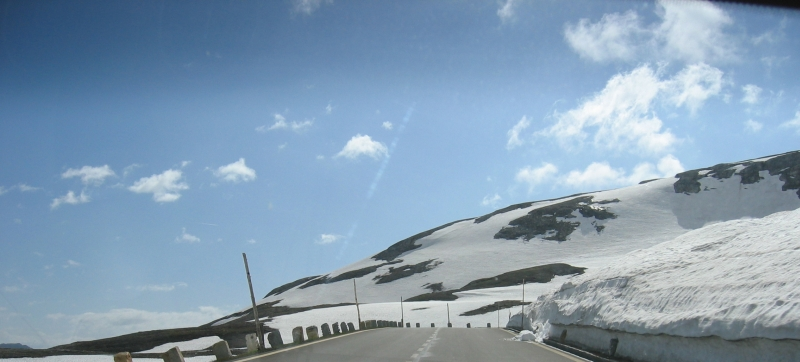
Snow cleared at the side of the road, in June.

=== Snow clearing ===
In the years 1936 and 1937, 350 men shoveled 250,000 cubic metres (8,800,000 cu ft) of snow in an average of seventy days to keep at least one lane on the road free. Since 1953, the five Wallack rotary plows and twelve GROHAG workers have been clearing 600,000 to 800,000 cubic metres (21,000,000 to 28,000,000 cu ft) of snow from the road and parking areas in around fourteen days every year in April.

In 1937, the road could be traversed for only 132 days, but in 1963, for 276 days. The Grossglockner High Alpine Road is normally open from the beginning of May to the end of October.

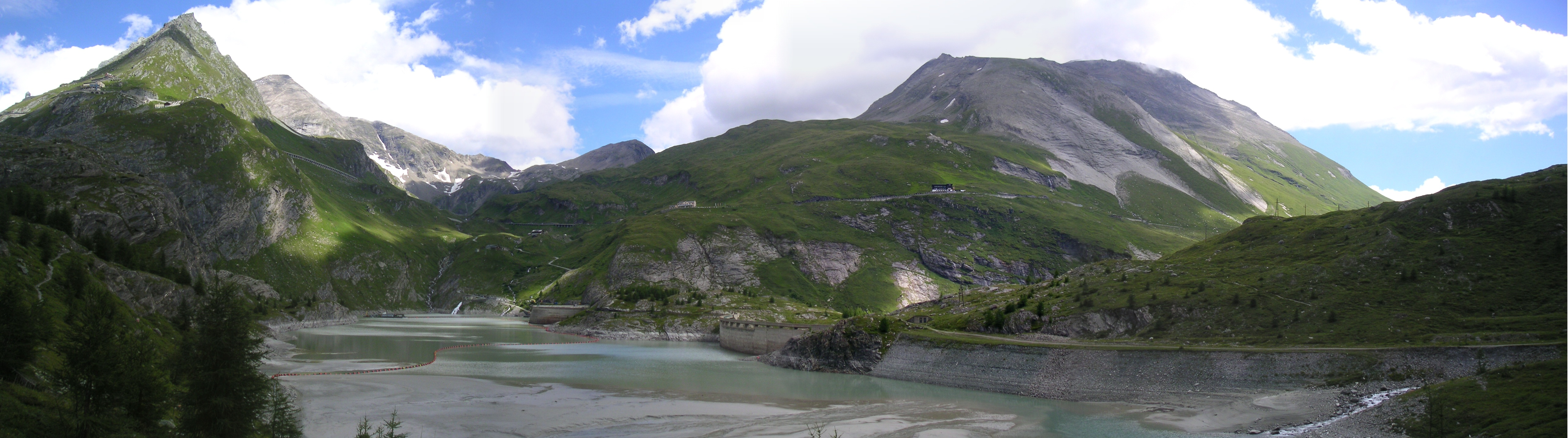
A panoramic view of Grossglockner High Alpine Road, close to Kaiser-Franz-Josefs-Höhe (The road descends across the left peak, passing the center buildings, and winding back downhill at the end of the lake, to follow along the right bank.)

== Giro d'Italia ==
Grossglockner has been featured in the men's Giro d'Italia twice so far. The first time was in the 17th stage of the 1971 Giro d'Italia, won by Pierfranco Vianelli. At that time, it became the first, and so far only, Cima Coppi to be located outside of Italy. Grossglockner was featured for a second time in 13th stage of the 2011 Giro d'Italia. It was José Rujano who arrived first, after an escape with Alberto Contador.

=== Winners of Grossglockner stage at the Giro d'Italia ===
Year	Stage	Name
1971	17	Pierfranco Vianelli (ITA)
2011	13	José Rujano (VEN)

== See also ==
- List of highest paved roads in Europe
- List of mountain passes
