= Tauern =

German word which originally meant 'high mountain pass' in the Austrian Central Alps

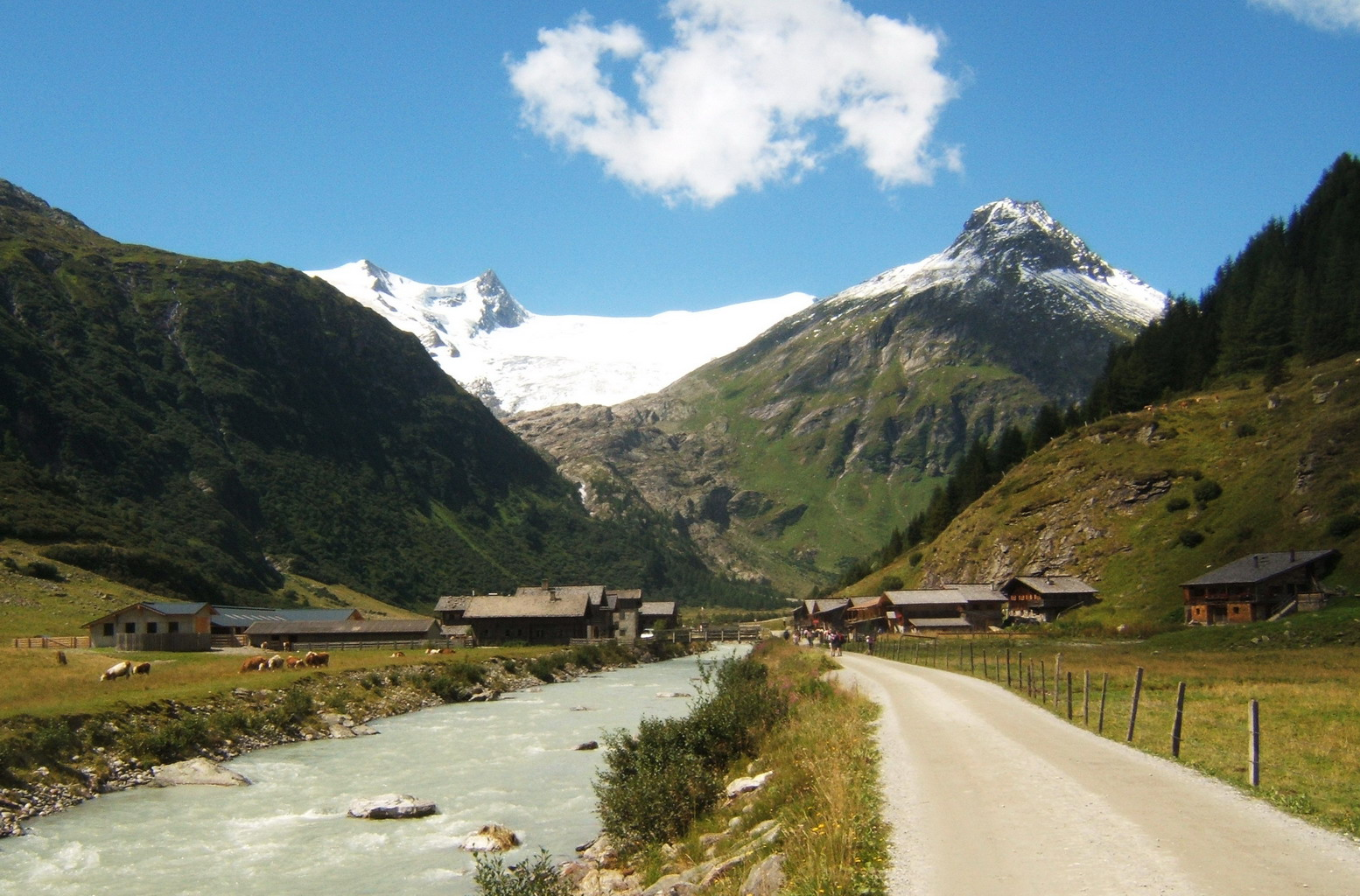
Innergschlöss: alm farming in the valley bottom, mountain forests, alpine meadows and glaciers in the High Tauern

The word Tauern (German pronunciation: [ˈtaʊ̯ɐn]) is German and originally meant 'high mountain pass' in the Austrian Central Alps, referring to the many bridleways and passes of the parallel side valleys of the River Salzach that cut into the mountain ranges. From the Middle Ages, when mining reached its heyday, the word Tauern was also used to name the corresponding ranges. The name has survived in many local placenames today.

== Etymology ==
The derivation of the name Tauern has been variously ascribed:

- One view is that the name Tauern is an old substrate word (*taur- for 'mountain‚ mountain pass, crossing'), which passed directly (less probable) or via the Slavic language (more likely) into German. (The name Tauern is probably pre-Slavic, but there is also a common Slavic word, tur- 'swelling, ridge, elongated hillock', etc.).
- Another postulation is that the Tauern is the only mountain range that has kept its pre-Slavic name in Carinthia as it passed down the generations. It is derived from the Indo-Germanic *(s)teur- for 'bull; great hill'. The Tauern are so-to-speak the "bulls", the old Taurisci of Upper Carinthia, the mountain dwellers, with the old Upper Carinthian town of Teurnia being the corresponding mountain town.

If the name Tauern is pre-Slavic, it could possibly be Celtic, and thus presumably linked to the Taurisci, or it could be Illyrian, a collective term possibly for the pre- and early Celtic population in the Alpine region. There is no clear link with the name of the municipality of Thaur near Innsbruck, which could be analogous to the Illyrian for 'rock', but could also be derived from the Rhaeto-Romance word Tgaura 'goat'.

== Ranges ==
There are several mountain ranges that bear the name Tauern today. In German, the first part of these names is usually the adjectival version of a placename. It is common in English sources, however, just to use the original name without the adjectival inflexion:

- High Tauern (German: Hohe Tauern), often just called the Tauern.
- Low Tauern (German: Niedere Tauern) with its subdivisions (from west to east):
  - Radstadt Tauern (German: Radstadter Tauern),
  - Schladming Tauern (German: Schladminger Tauern),
  - Rottenmann and Wölz Tauern (German: Rottenmanner und Wölzer Tauern)
  - Seckau Tauern (German: Seckauer Tauern),
- Ossiach Tauern, a ridge in the Gurktal Alps

The High and Low Tauern together were historically called the Tauern Alps (Tauernalpen) and are still described as such in many sources today. They also extend to the Brenner Pass–Liesing/Palten valley, i.e. including the Zillertal Alps.

=== Transport links ===
The following transport links facilitate the crossing of the Tauern from north to south:

- The Felbertauern Road (B108) which passes under the range through the Felbertauern Tunnel in the area of the Felber Tauern.
- The Tauern Railway passes under the mountains through the Tauern Tunnel between the Mallnitz Tauern and the High Tauern. This is the only north-south railway link between the Brenner Pass in the west and the Schober Pass in the east.
- The Großglockner High Alpine Road crosses over the Tauern in the area of the Hochtor mountain.
- The Tauern Autobahn (A10) passes under the Radstadt Tauern.
- The Katschberg Road (B99) crosses the Radstadt Tauern over the Radstadt Tauern Pass.
- The Sölk Pass crosses the Low Tauern and delineates the boundary between the Schladming and the Wölz Tauern.
- The Trieben Road (B114) crosses the Low Tauern at the village of Hohentauern and delineates the boundary between the Rottenmann and the Triebener (Seckau) Tauern.

== Passes ==
The following passes bear the name Tauern (from west to east):

- In the High Tauern they are all non-drivable bridleways:
  - The Krimmler Tauern (2,634 m) links the Krimmler Achental with the South Tyrolean Ahrntal.
  - The Felber Tauern or Windisch-Matrei Tauern (2,481 m) links the Pinzgau valley of Felbertal with the East Tyrolean Tauerntal, in the immediate vicinity of the Alten Tauern (2,498 m).
  - The Kalser Tauern (2,518 m) links the Pinzgau valley of Stubachtal with the East Tyrolean Kalser Dorfer valley.
  - The Heiligenbluter or Rauris Tauern (2,576 m), commonly called the Hochtor, links the Pinzgau valley of the Fuscher Ache with the Carinthian Möll valley.
  - The Goldberg or Fragant Tauern (2,754 m) links the Pinzgau Rauriser Tal with the Carinthian Fragant valley.
  - The Low Tauern, also Mallnitz Tauern and the High Tauern (2,459 m), also called the Korntauern, link the Pinzgau valley of Gasteinertal with the Carinthian village of Mallnitz and the Möll valley.
- In the Low Tauern:
  - The Radstadt Tauern (1,738 m) links Radstadt in the Pongau with Mauterndorf in the Lungau via the two Taurach valleys.
  - The Triebener Tauern (1,278 m), also called the Rottenmann Tauern, links the Palten valley near Trieben with the Pöls valley.
- In the Kitzbühel Alps:
  - Thurntauern, today the Thurn Pass

Corresponding to the passes there are also several places called Tauerntal ('Tauern valley'), Tauernbach ('Tauern stream') and Taurach ('Tauern river'), the latter sometimes descending from a Tauern pass in both directions.

== Places ==
The following places also take their names from the term Tauern:

- The Pongau municipality of Untertauern below the Radstadt Tauern Pass,
- The winter sports village of Obertauern on the Radstadt Tauern Pass,
- The cadastral municipality of Untertauern from Ossiach by the Ossiach Tauern
- The hamlet of Tauern in Ossiach
- The village of Tauer in Matrei in Osttirol

== Mountains ==
Several mountains, especially near the passes, bear names derived from the term Tauern:

- Felber Tauernkogel (2,988 m), west of the Felber Tauern pass in the Venediger Group.
  - Tauernkopf (2,704 m), an insignificant subpeak on the eastern arête of the Felber Tauernkogel.
- Krimmler Tauernkogel (2,872 m), near the Krimmler Tauern pass in the eastern Zillertal Alps, Salzburg–South Tyrolean border
- Tauernklammhöhe (2,798 m), an insignificant summit between the Hollersbachtal and the Felbertal in the Venediger Group. The ravine of Tauernklamm bisects its eastern flank.
- Kalser Tauernkogel (2,683 m), northwest of the Kals Tauern in the Granatspitze Group.
- Tauernkopf (2,626 m), east of the Hochtor in the Goldberg Group.
- Tauernkogel (2,249 m) in the Tennen Mountains, giving its name to the Tauernkogel Group.
- Funtenseetauern and Gotzentauern in the Berchtesgaden Alps.

== Other usages ==
- The Tauern Ridgeway crosses the Ankogel and Goldberg Groups from Murtörl to the Heiligenbluter Hochtor.
- Tauernmoossee, a lake in the Stubach valley
- Hohe Tauern National Park
- Tauernkraftwerke AG (Kaprun Power Station)
- Tauernsheck, a breed of Austrian goat

== Literature ==
- August Prinzinger: Die Tauern. In: Mitteilungen der Gesellschaft für Salzburger Landeskunde (MGSLK) 7, 1867, S. 46-78 (Google eBook, vollständige Ansicht, p. 46, at Google Books)
- Heinrich Wallmann: Was versteht man unter Tauern? Eine alpine Studie. In: Zeitschrift des Deutschen Alpenvereins, Jahrgang 1869–70 (Band I), pp. 442–472. (Online at ALO).
- Eberhard Kranzmayer: Ortsnamenbuch von Kärnten. Band 1, Die Siedlungsgeschichte Kärntens von der Urzeit bis zur Gegenwart im Spiegel der Namen. Archiv für vaterländische Geschichte und Topographie, Band 50. Verlag des Geschichtsvereines für Kärnten, Klagenfurt 1956.
- Willi End, Hubert Peterka: Glocknergruppe und Granatspitzgruppe – ein Führer für Täler, Hütten und Berge, verfaßt nach den Richtlinien der UIAA. 8th, fully revised edition. Alpenvereinsführer, Zentralalpen. Bergverlag Rother, Munich, 1990, ISBN 3-7633-1258-7.
- Willi End, Hubert Peterka (Begr.): Venedigergruppe – mit nördlichen Deferegger Alpen (Panargenkamm, Lasörlingkamm). Alpenvereinsführer für Täler, Hütten und Berge, verfasst nach den Richtlinien der UIAA für Wanderer, Bergsteiger und Kletterer. 5th, updated and fully revised edition. Alpenvereinsführer, Ostalpen. Bergverlag Rother, Munich, 2006, ISBN 3-7633-1242-0.
- Heinz-Dieter Pohl: Die Bergnamen der Hohen Tauern. OeAV-Dokumente, Vol. 6. Österreichischer Alpenverein, Fachabteilung Raumplanung-Naturschutz, Innsbruck 2009.
