= Großer Muntanitz =

Mountain located in Austria

Großer Muntainitz
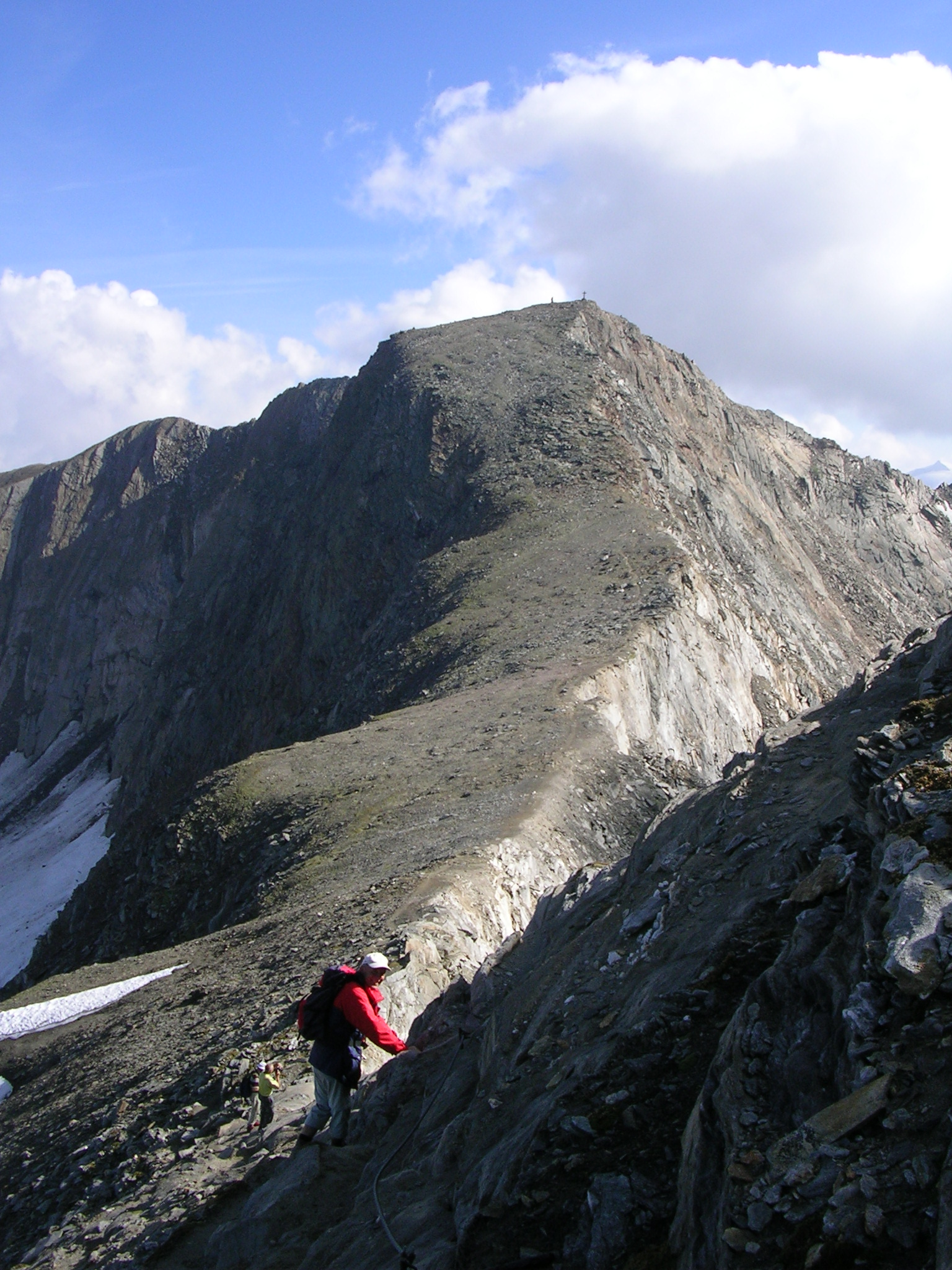
- Großer Muntanitz

Highest point
- Elevation: 3,232 m (10,604 ft)
- Prominence: 717 m (2,352 ft)
- Listing: Alpine mountains above 3000 m
- Coordinates: 47°4′N 12°35′E

Geography
- Location within Alps
- Location: Tyrol, Austria
- Parent range: High Tauern

Climbing
- First ascent: 1871

The Großer Muntanitz (3,232m) is the highest mountain in the Granatspitze Group, located between the Venediger Group and the Glockner Group in the High Tauern, Austria.

The mountain is close to Matrei in Osttirol and Kals am Großglockner in Tyrol, and climbs usually start from either village. The summit offers fine views of both Großglockner and Großvenediger.
