= Hocheiser =

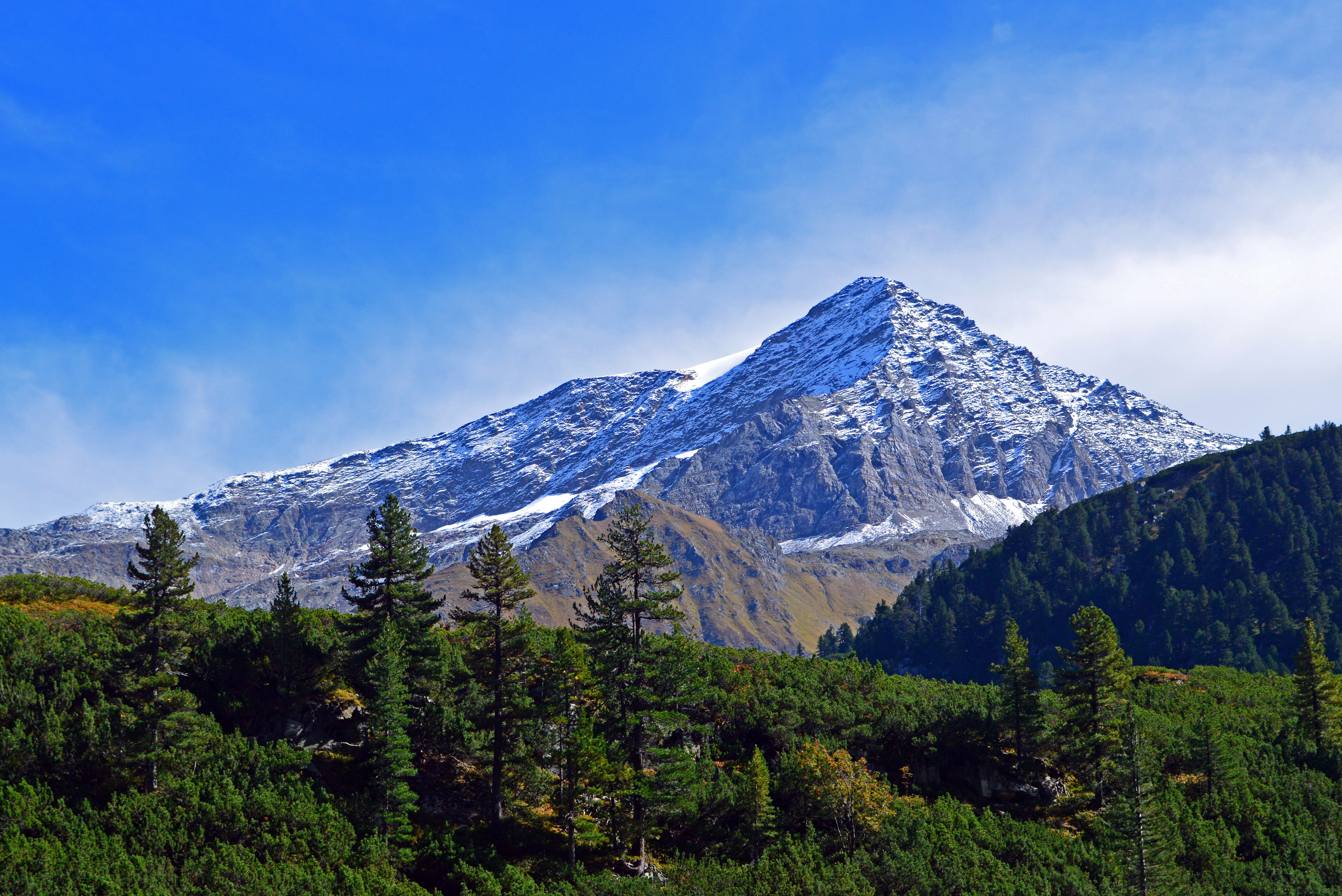
- Hocheiser

Highest point
- Elevation: 3,206 m (10,518 ft)
- Prominence: 567 m (1,860 ft)
- Listing: Alpine mountains above 3000 m
- Coordinates: 47°09′22″N 12°40′23″E

Geography
- Location within Alps
- Location: Salzburg, Austria
- Parent range: Glockner Group, High Tauern

Climbing
- First ascent: 1871

Hocheiser (3,206m) is a mountain in the Glockner Group of the High Tauern in the state of Salzburg, Austria.

Located between the Stubach and Kaprun valleys, Hocheiser is an impressive sight from the west. It is usually climbed from the Stubach side and provides excellent views of nearby mountains such as Großglockner, Grossvenediger and Grosses Wiesbachhorn from its summit.
