= Keeskogel =

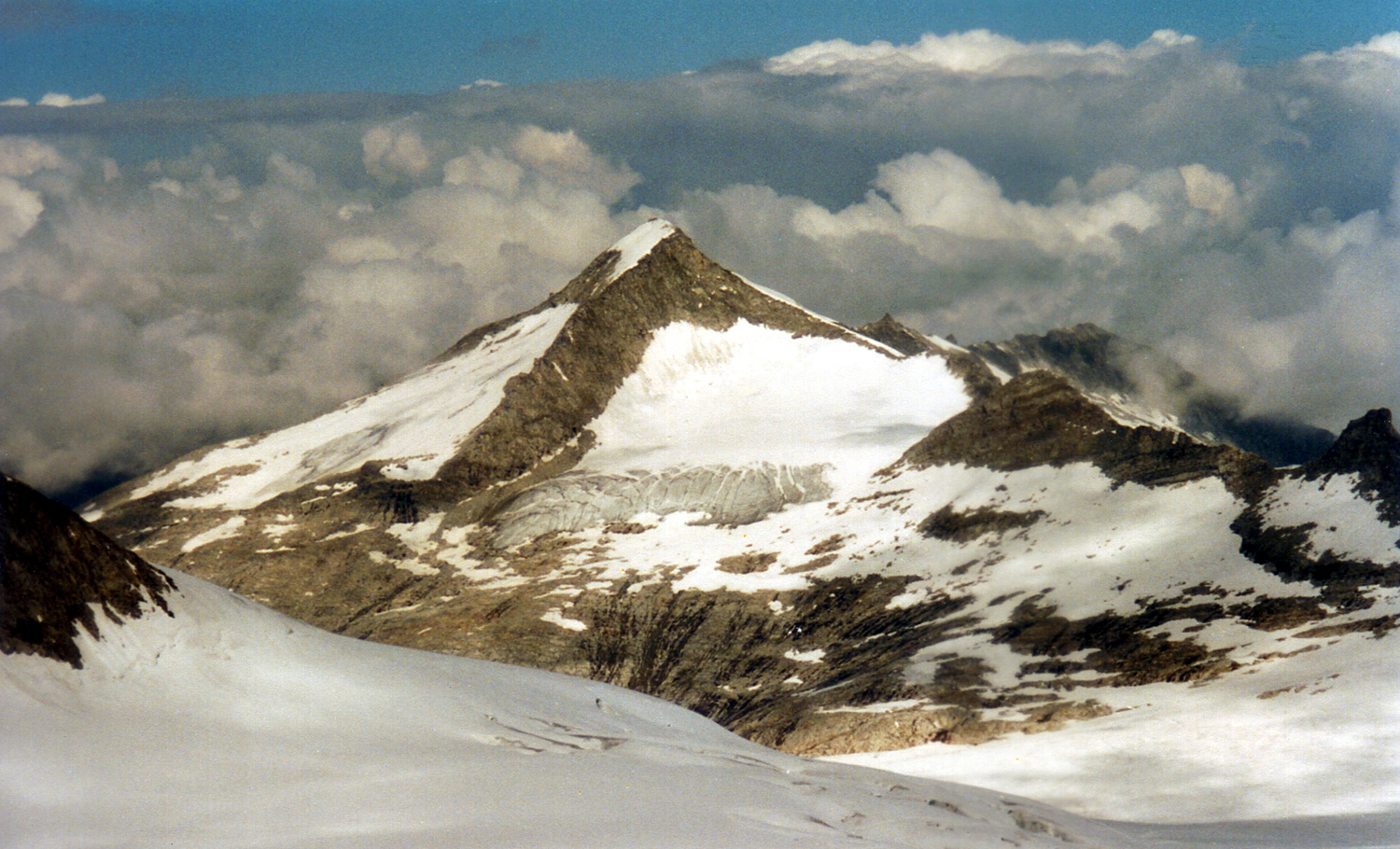
- The Keeskogel from the Venediger's north basin (below the Venediger Scharte or col)

Highest point
- Elevation: 3,291 m (AA) (10,797 ft)
- Prominence: 373 m ↓ Zwischensulzbachtörl
- Isolation: 3.20 km → Großvenediger
- Listing: Alpine mountains above 3000 m
- Coordinates: 47°08′10″N 12°18′41″E

Geography
- Location within Austria
- Location: Salzburg, Austria
- Parent range: High Tauern, Venediger Group

Climbing
- Normal route: Climb from the Kürsinger Hut (challenging mountain walk)

The Keeskogel, a mountain with a height of 3,291 m (AA), lies in the Venediger Group of the High Tauern in Austria. The summit is located about 4 km as the crow flies northwest of the Großvenediger (3,666 m (AA)). The waymarked, glacier-free normal route from the Kürsinger Hut (2,547 m (AA)), is a relatively straightforward climb in dry and snow-free condition and takes about 1½ to 2 hours to reach the summit (sure-footedness required). Especially impressive in good weather is the view from the summit of the north side of the Großvenediger and the main chain of the Tauern and the glaciated landscape of the Obersulzbachkees and Untersulzbachkees.

== Literature and maps ==
- Willi End/Hubert Peterka: Alpine Club Guide: Venedigergruppe; Bergverlag Rudolf Rother, 5th edn., Munich, 2006; ISBN 978-3-7633-1242-9
- Alpine Club map, Sheet 36, 1:25,000 series, Venedigergruppe, ISBN 3-928777-49-1
