= Granatspitze Group =

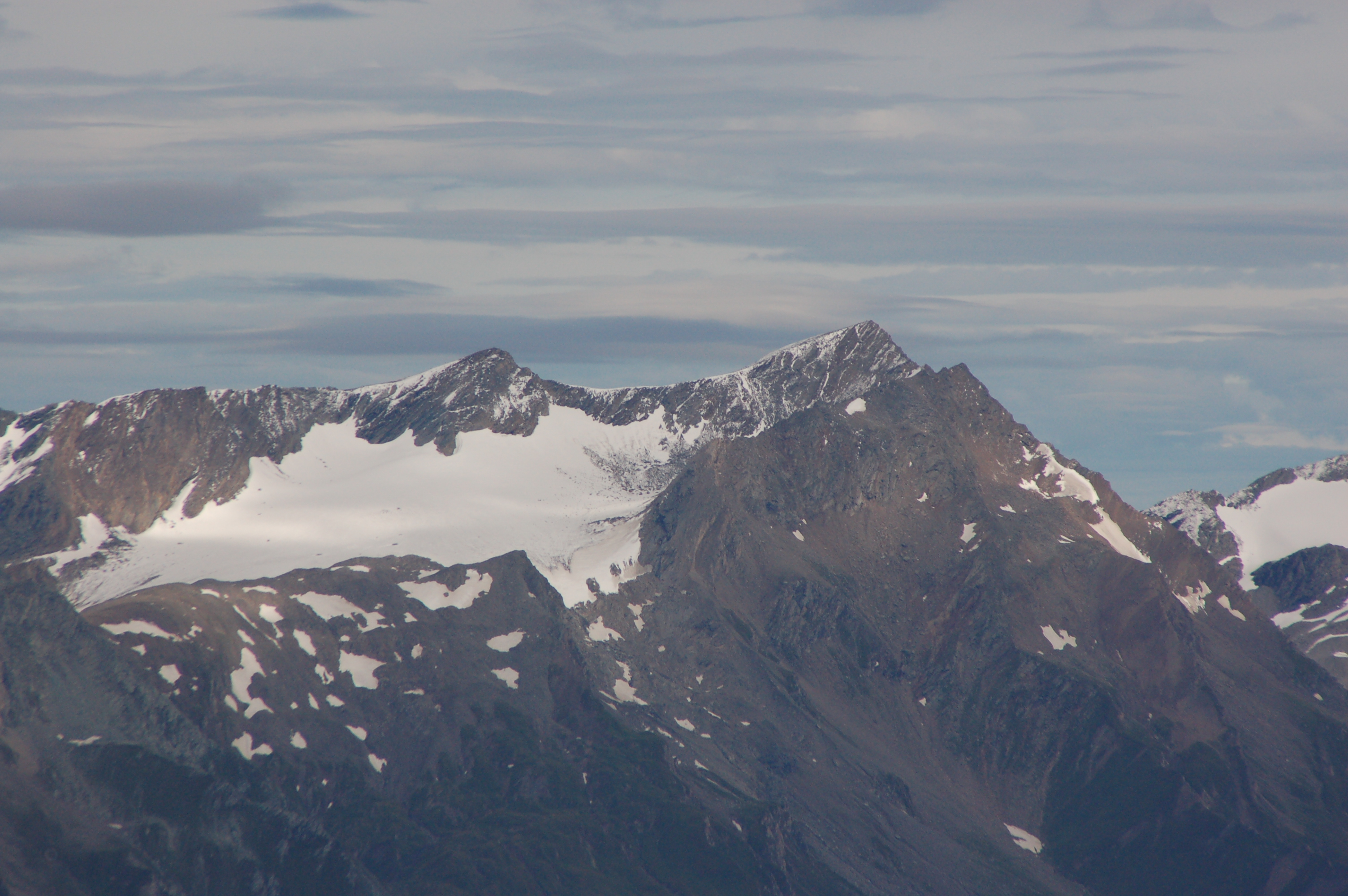
- Muntanitz, the highest mountain in the Granatspitze Group

Highest point
- Peak: Großer Muntanitz
- Elevation: 3,232 m above sea level (AA)

Geography
- Location within Austria
- Country: Austria
- States: Tyrol and Salzburg
- Range coordinates: 47°04′00″N 12°35′00″E

The Granatspitze Group (German: Granatspitzgruppe), sometimes also the Granatspitz Group, is a sub-group of the Central Alps within the Eastern Alps. Together with the Ankogel Group, the Goldberg Group, the Glockner Group, the Schober Group, the Kreuzeck Group, the Venediger Group, the Villgraten Mountains and the Rieserferner Group, the Granatspitze Group forms the main range known as the High Tauern. The Granatspitze Group is located in Austria in the federal states of Salzburg and Tyrol. Its highest summit is the Großer Muntanitz, 3,232 m (AA)

The Granatspitze Group is located in the central part of the High Tauern. The Felbertauernstraße road is the boundary of the group in the west. The group is rather overshadowed by its more famous neighbours which include the Großglockner and the Großvenediger. The range takes its name from the Granatspitze, 3,086 m above sea level (AA)

== Neighbouring ranges ==
The Granatspitze Group is bordered by the following other mountain ranges of the Alps:

- Kitzbühel Alps (to the north)
- Glockner Group (to the east)
- Schober Group (to the southeast)
- Villgraten Mountains (to the southwest)
- Venediger Group (to the west)

== Summits ==
All named three-thousanders (main peaks in the Granatspitze Group):

- Großer Muntanitz 3,232 m above sea level (AA)
- Kleiner Muntanitz 3,192 m above sea level (AA)
- Oberer Muntanitzpalfen 3,170 m above sea level (AA)
- Luckenkogel 3,100 m above sea level (AA)
- Stubacher Sonnblick 3,088 m above sea level (AA)
- Granatspitze 3,086 m above sea level (AA)
- Vordere Kendlspitze 3,085 m above sea level (AA)
- Hintere Kendlspitze 3,085 m above sea level (AA)
- Kalser Bärenkopf 3,079 m above sea level (AA)
- Gradötz 3,063 m above sea level (AA)
- Stellachwand 3,060 m above sea level (AA)
- Grauer Schimme 3,053 m above sea level (AA)
- Wellachköpfe 3,037 m above sea level (AA)
- Äußerer Knappentröger 3,031 m above sea level (AA)

== Sources ==
- Georg Zlöbl: Die Dreitausender Osttirols im Nationalpark Hohe Tauern. Verlag Grafik Zloebl, Lienz-Tristach 2007, ISBN 3-200-00428-2
