= Ossiach Tauern =

Coordinates: 46°39′N 14°03′E

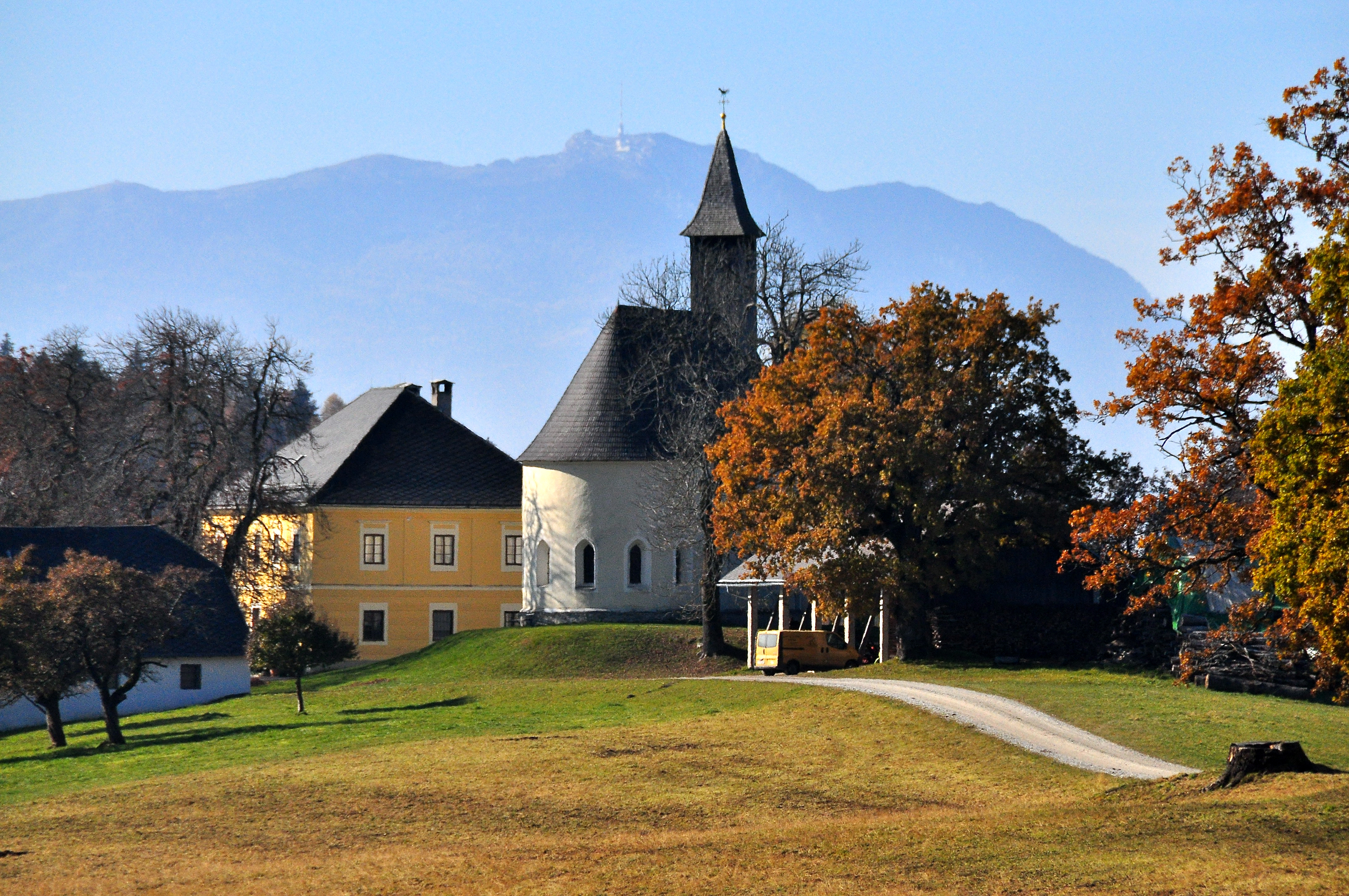
Dairy and chapel in Tauern, behind: the Dobratsch mountain

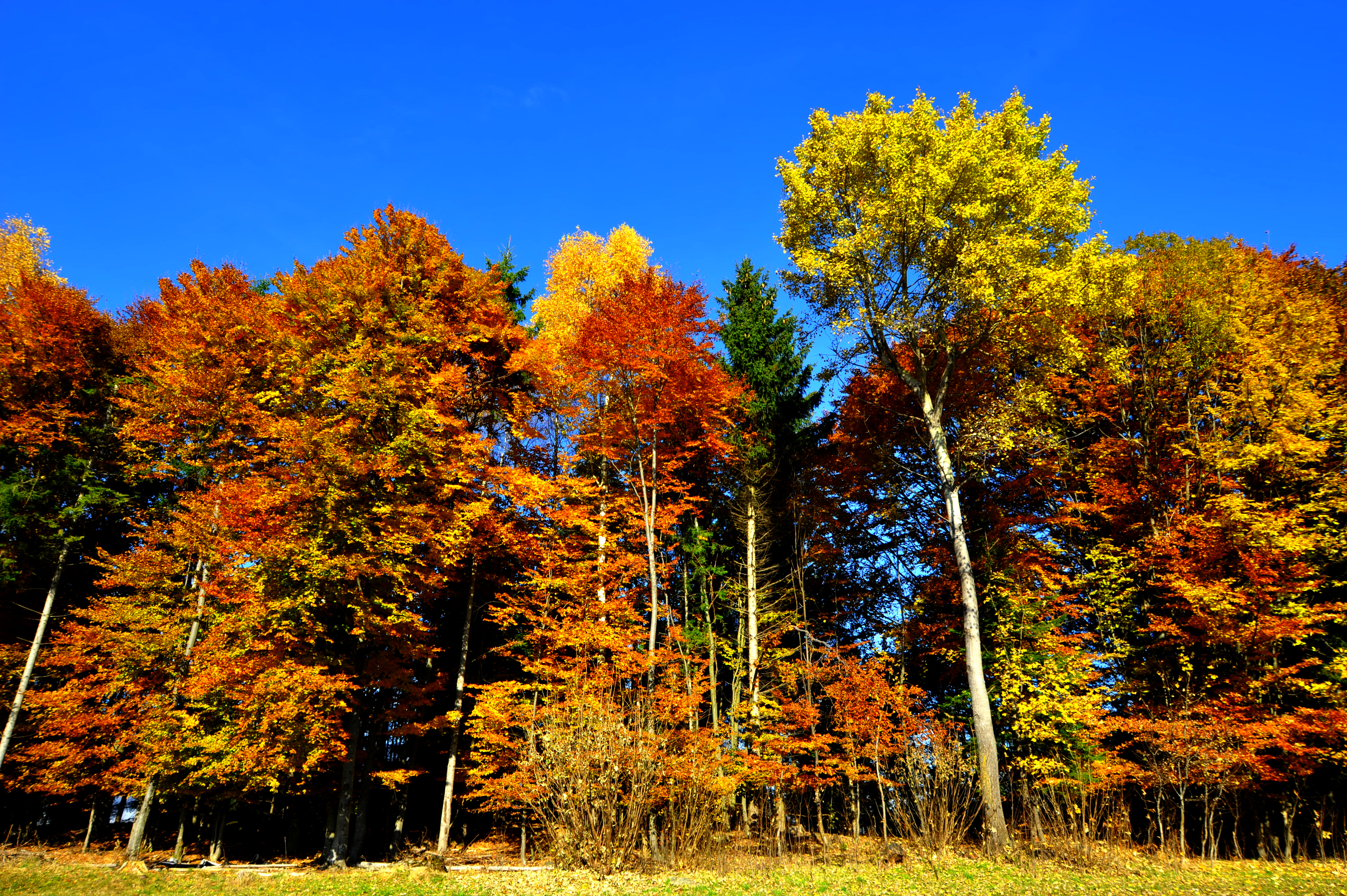
Mixed wood in the autumn, near the hamlet of Tauern

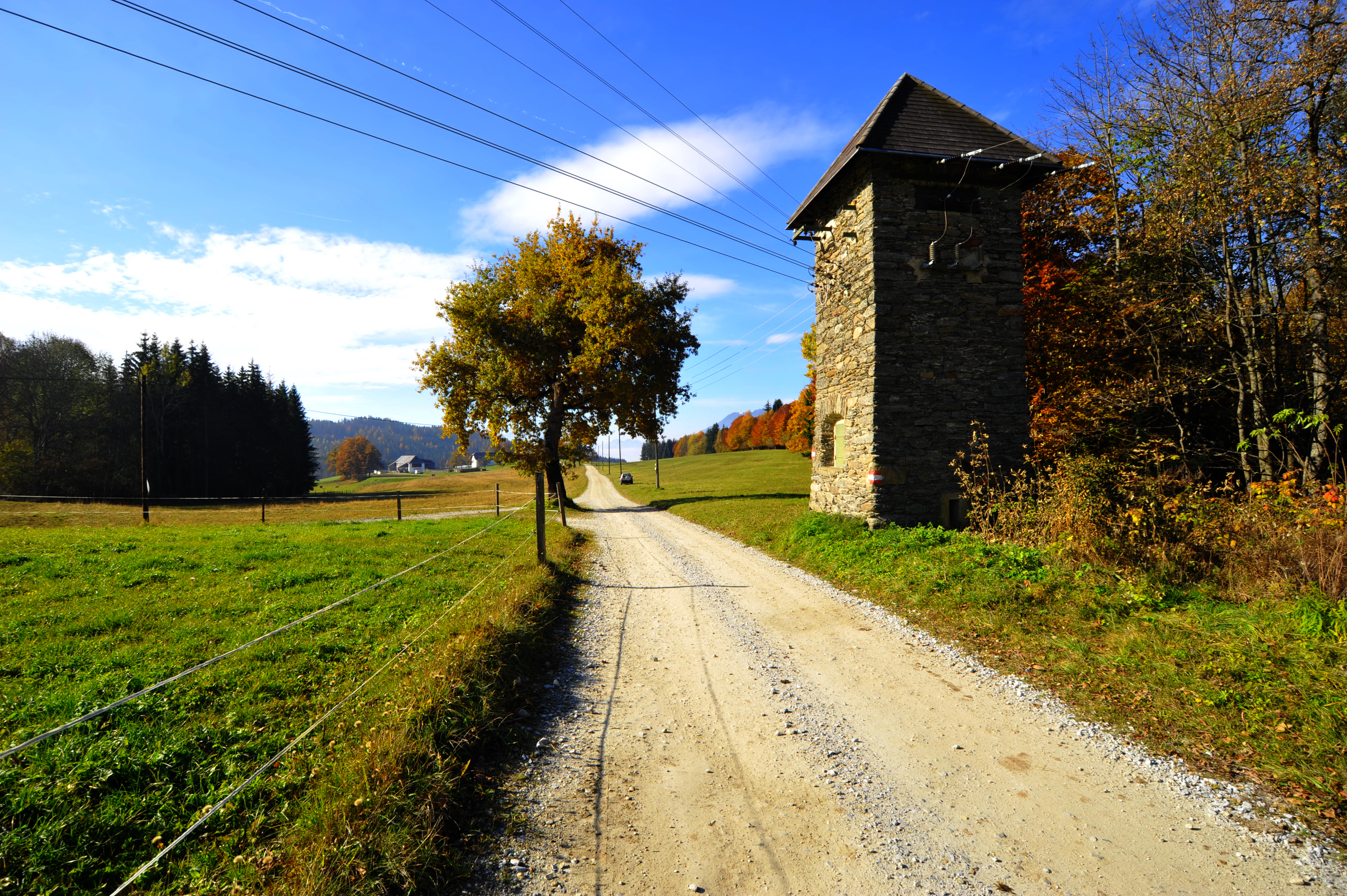
Transformer station near the hamlet of Tauern

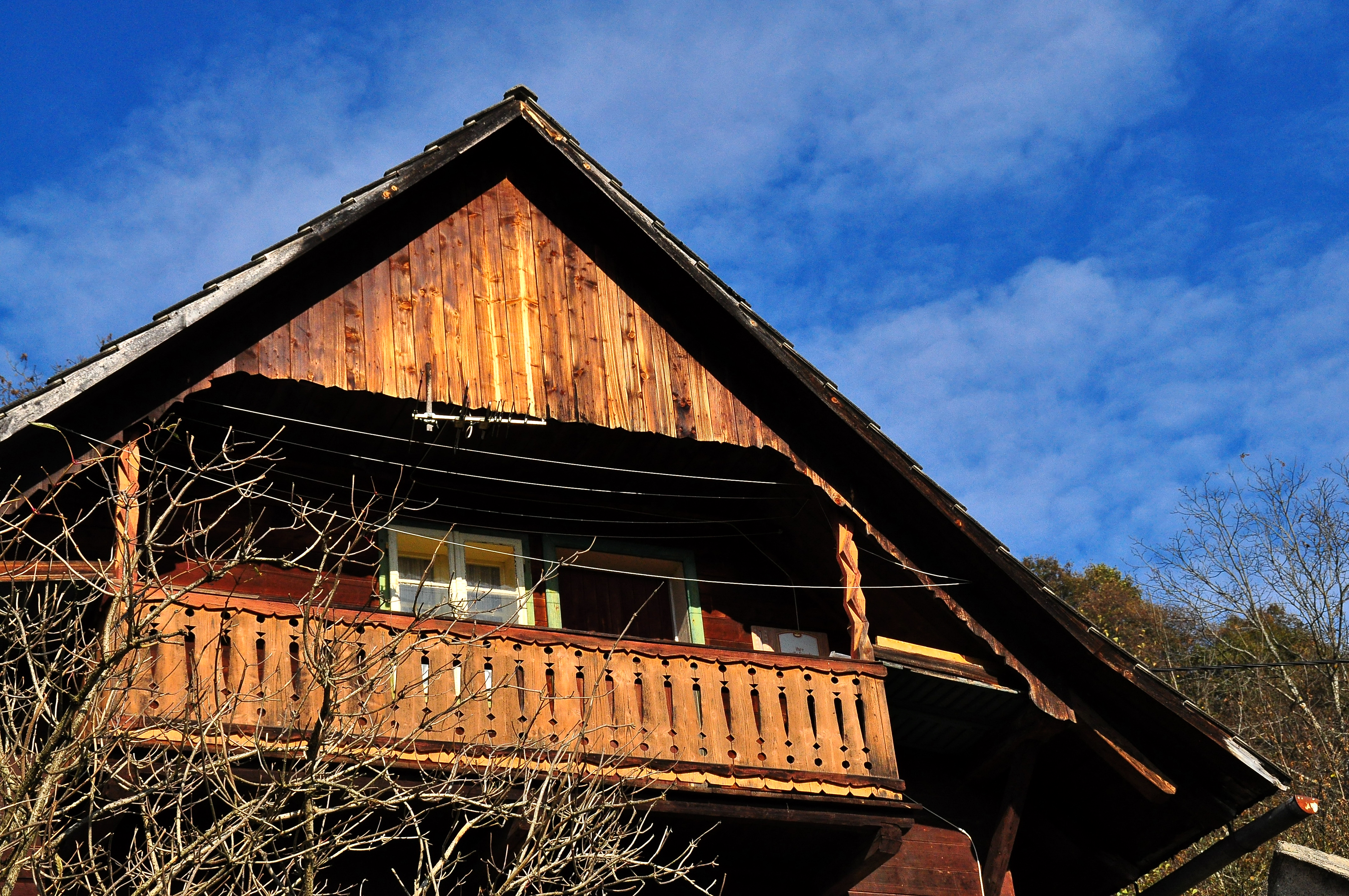
Typical central Carinthian wooden house in Pernegg

The Ossiach Tauern (German: Ossiacher Tauern, Slovene: Osojske Ture, locally just Turje) is a wooded mountain ridge in the Austrian state of Carinthia between Lake Ossiach in the northwest and the Wörthersee in the southeast. The highest point of the Ossiach Tauern is the Taubenbühel which is 1,069 m (AA). At its western end, on a prominent hill, are the ruins of Landskron Castle. Not far from the re-opened castle, which is now used as a restaurant and falconry station, hikers can join the Tauern hiking trail to the Jungfernsprung, a rock formation that drops steeply to Lake Ossiach, from where there is an extensive view of the western part of the lake and the Gerlitze. An old quarry is visible from Villach, which until recently used to produce rocks for river engineering in Carinthia. In the Ossiach Tauern there are also several old mining galleries. Centuries ago, zinc and other ores were mined here.

Colloquially the Ossiach Tauern are also called Die kleinen Tauern ("the little Tauern"). On a rise above the hamlet of Tauern stands the little Tauern church. In the northeast, across the Bleistatt stream are the ruins of Prägrad Castle.

== Eastern part ==
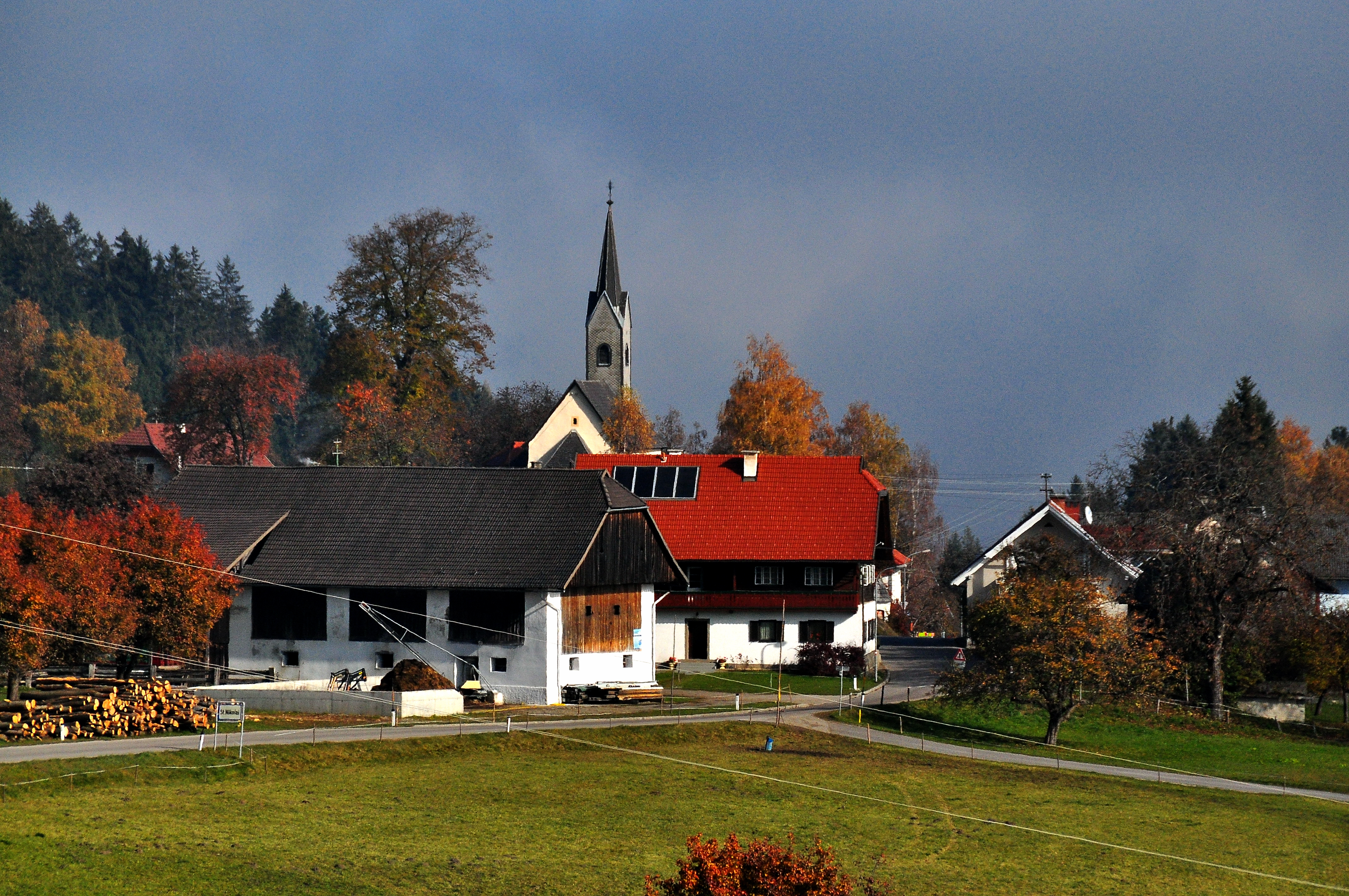
Sankt Nikolai Feldkirchen in Kärnten

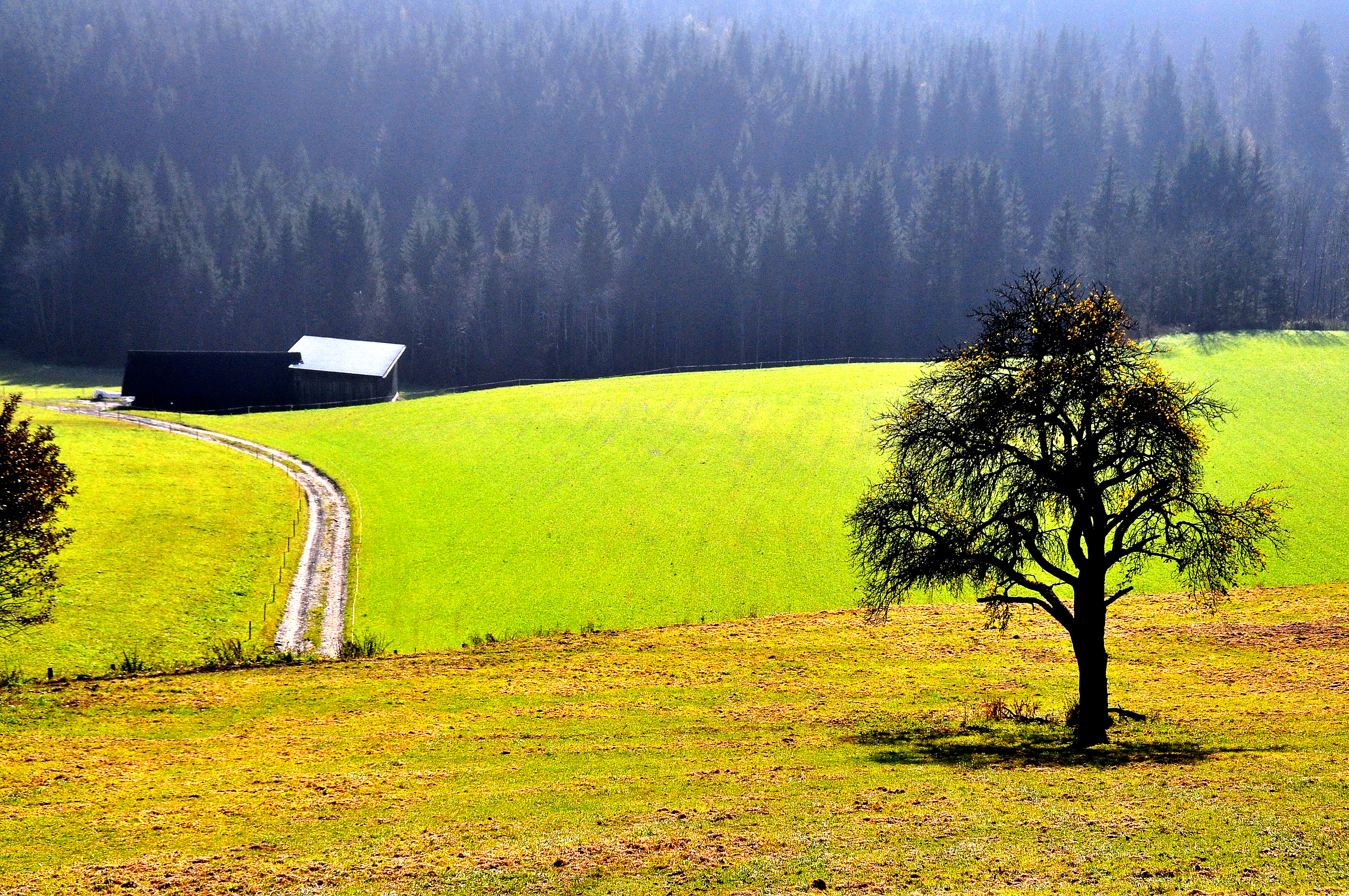
Countryside near Pernegg Feldkirchen in Kärnten

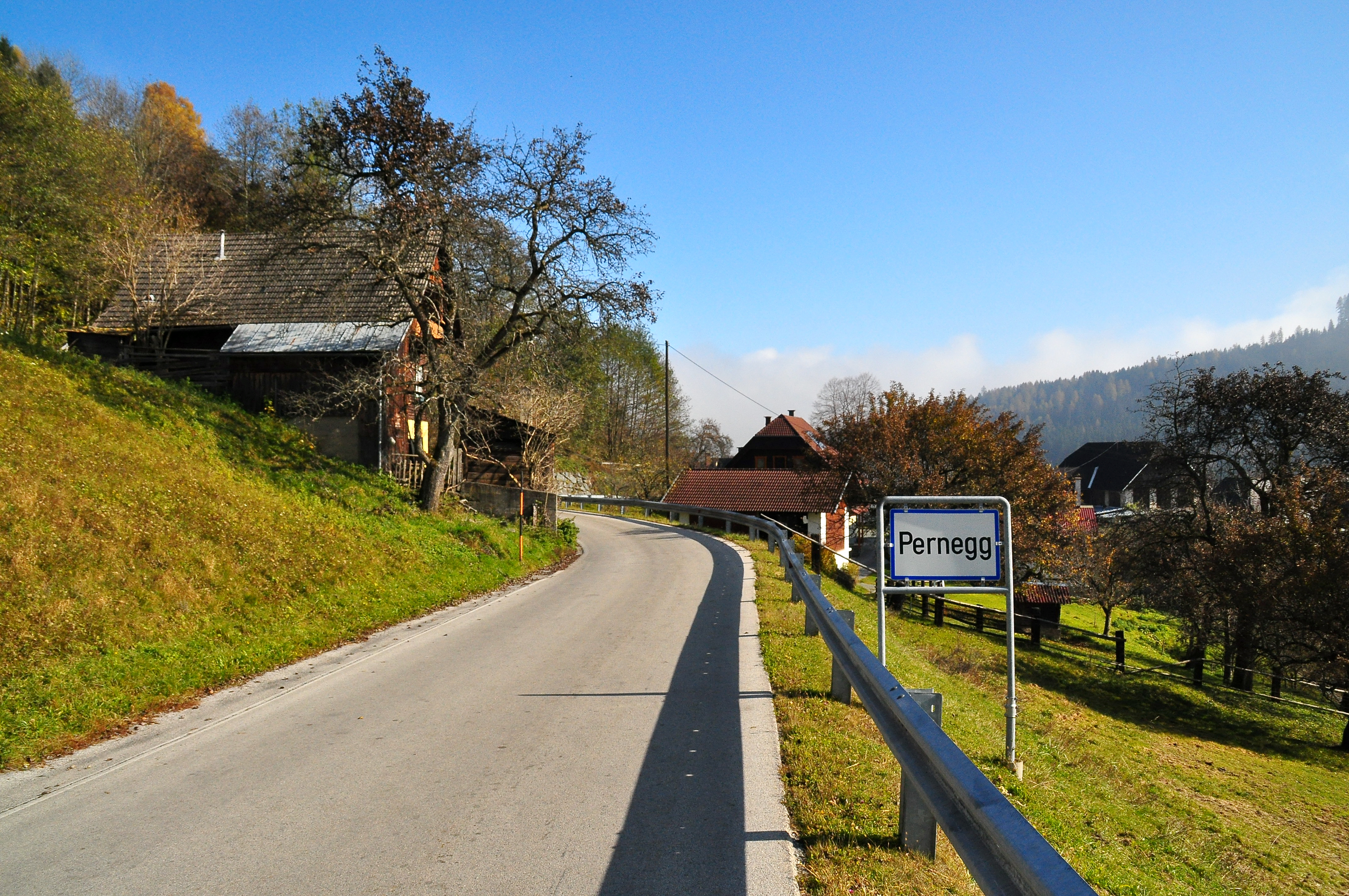
Pernegg Feldkirchen in Kärnten
