= Granatspitze =

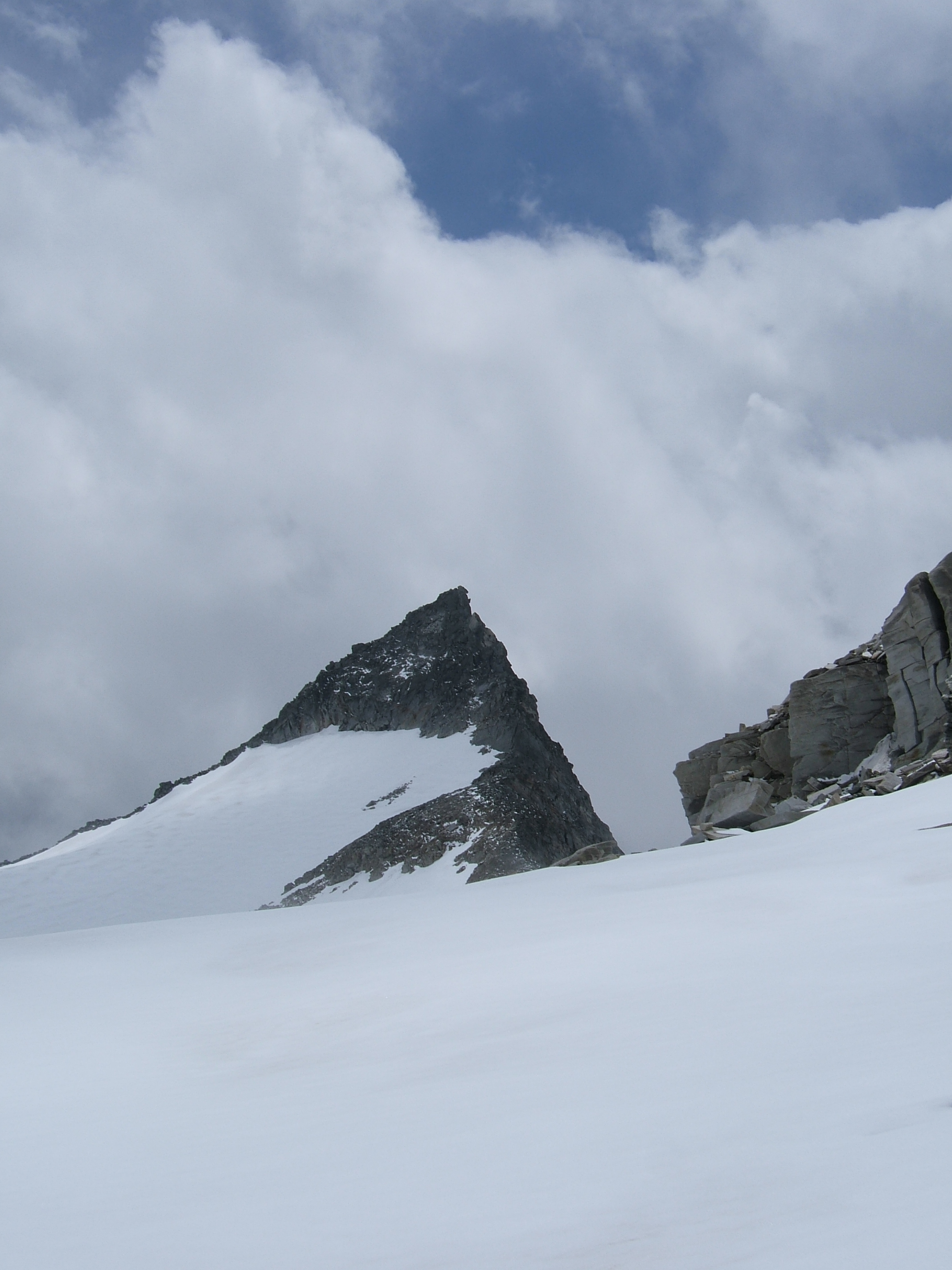
- The Granatspitze from the north, from the east flank of the Stubacher Sonnblick

Highest point
- Elevation: 3,086 m (AA) (10,125 ft)
- Prominence: 116 m ↓ Granatscharte
- Isolation: 0.85 km → Stubacher Sonnblick
- Coordinates: 47°07′29″N 12°35′31″E

Geography
- Location within Austria
- Location: on the border of East Tyrol and Salzburg, Austria
- Parent range: High Tauern, Granatspitze Group

Climbing
- Normal route: East Ridge (Ostgrat) from Rudolfs Hut (II-)

The Granatspitze (3,086 m (AA)) is the mountain giving its name to the Granatspitze Group in the High Tauern, the Alpine backbone of Austria. This, despite the fact that several peaks in this group are actually higher, for example the Stubacher Sonnblick which is less than a kilometre to the north and two metres higher. But, unlike, its oft-climbed neighbour, the Granatspitze is more rarely frequented due to the level of difficulty of the ascent. The steep summit block of this striking peak is made of granite.

== Ascent ==
The easiest ascent runs from Rudolfs Hut initially westwards towards the notch of the Granatscharte, turning south in front of it to continue along the East Ridge (Ostgrat) to the summit. This route takes about 3 hours and has a climbing grade of II-. Another option is offered by the North Ridge (Nordgrat) with its several pinnacles or rock towers (Grattürme), but this is more difficult, albeit still II-. The South Ridge is also an option, especially from the East Tyrolean side. This can be reached from the Karl Fürst Hut, an emergency shelter west of the Stubacher Sonnblick, crossing the Prägratkees glacier, which has several difficult crevasses at the notch of Untere Keeswinkelscharte (II-).

== Climate ==
Granatspitze has a tundra climate (Köppen ET).

Climate data for Rudolfshuette: 2317m (1991−2020, extremes 1981−2020)
Month	Jan	Feb	Mar	Apr	May	Jun	Jul	Aug	Sep	Oct	Nov	Dec	Year
Record high °C (°F)	7.5 (45.5)	8.1 (46.6)	14.5 (58.1)	11.7 (53.1)	17.0 (62.6)	21.8 (71.2)	21.1 (70.0)	21.6 (70.9)	17.6 (63.7)	15.4 (59.7)	11.2 (52.2)	9.0 (48.2)	21.8 (71.2)
Mean daily maximum °C (°F)	−3.6 (25.5)	−4.3 (24.3)	−1.4 (29.5)	1.6 (34.9)	5.6 (42.1)	9.5 (49.1)	11.5 (52.7)	11.7 (53.1)	7.8 (46.0)	4.6 (40.3)	0.0 (32.0)	−2.8 (27.0)	3.4 (38.0)
Daily mean °C (°F)	−6.7 (19.9)	−7.1 (19.2)	−4.6 (23.7)	−1.5 (29.3)	2.7 (36.9)	6.3 (43.3)	8.5 (47.3)	8.9 (48.0)	5.0 (41.0)	2.0 (35.6)	−2.6 (27.3)	−5.7 (21.7)	0.4 (32.8)
Mean daily minimum °C (°F)	−9.2 (15.4)	−10.8 (12.6)	−7.5 (18.5)	−4.6 (23.7)	−0.3 (31.5)	3.2 (37.8)	5.1 (41.2)	5.6 (42.1)	2.2 (36.0)	−0.7 (30.7)	−5.1 (22.8)	−8.2 (17.2)	−2.5 (27.5)
Record low °C (°F)	−29.0 (−20.2)	−26.4 (−15.5)	−25.7 (−14.3)	−20.2 (−4.4)	−13.8 (7.2)	−6.9 (19.6)	−4.2 (24.4)	−4.5 (23.9)	−8.3 (17.1)	−16.1 (3.0)	−22.4 (−8.3)	−26.0 (−14.8)	−29.0 (−20.2)
Average precipitation mm (inches)	161 (6.3)	153 (6.0)	206 (8.1)	186 (7.3)	190 (7.5)	259 (10.2)	284 (11.2)	274 (10.8)	204 (8.0)	146 (5.7)	170 (6.7)	170 (6.7)	2,403 (94.5)
Average snowfall cm (inches)	194 (76)	214 (84)	248 (98)	221 (87)	111 (44)	70 (28)	20 (7.9)	17 (6.7)	62 (24)	96 (38)	178 (70)	218 (86)	1,649 (649.6)
Source: Central Institute for Meteorology and Geodynamics

== Sources and maps ==
- Geord Zlöbl: Die Dreitausender Osttirols im Nationalpark Hohe Tauern. Verlag Grafik Zloebl, Lienz-Tristach 2005, ISBN 3-200-00428-2.
- Alpine Club map sheet 39, 1:25.000, Granatspitzgruppe. Österreichischer Alpenverein, 2002, ISBN 3-928777-75-0.
