= High Tauern =

Mountain range of the eastern Alps

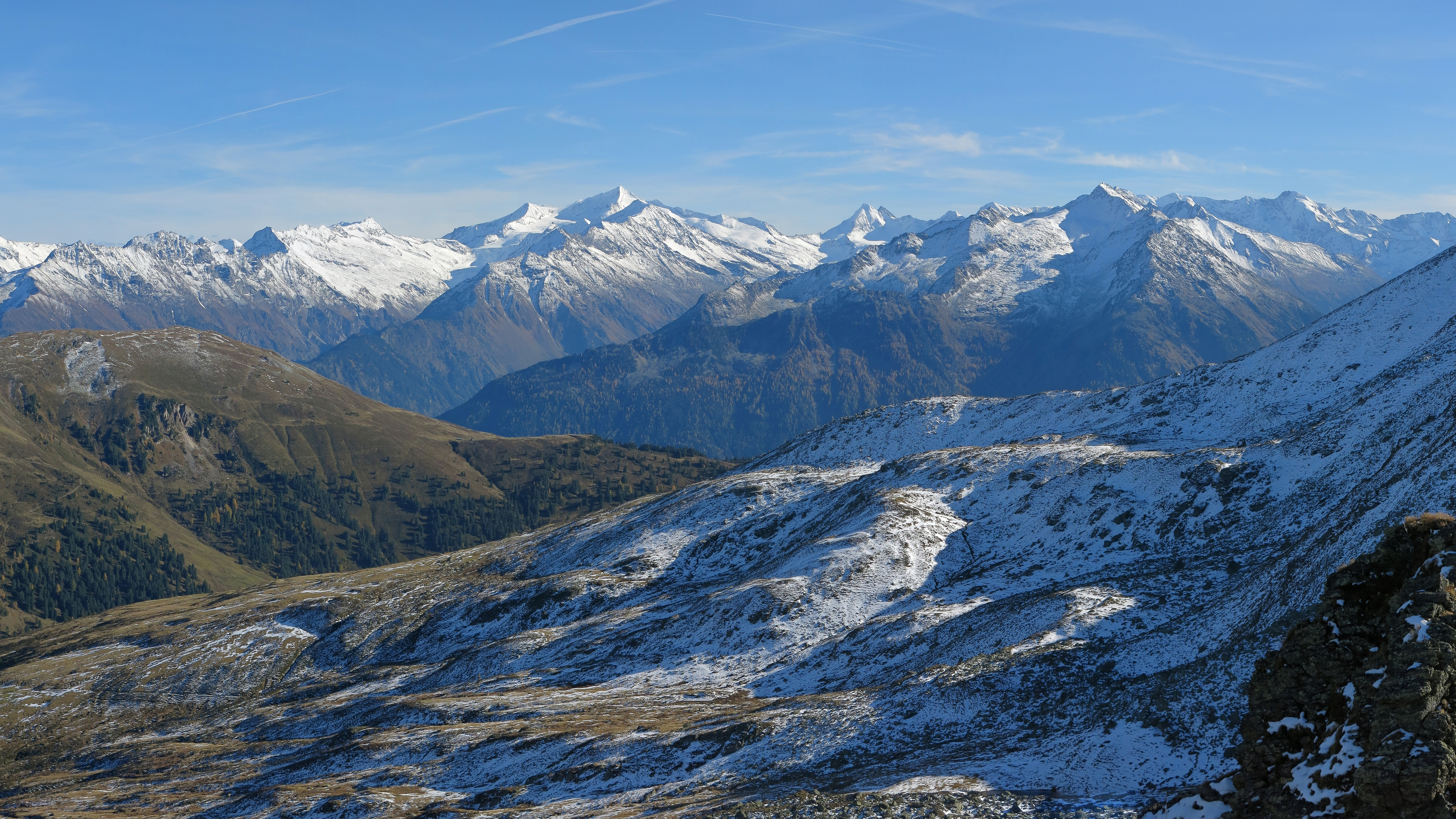
- Panorama of the Venediger Group

Highest point
- Peak: Grossglockner
- Elevation: 3,798 m (12,461 ft)
- Coordinates: 47°04′30″N 12°41′40″E

Dimensions
- Length: 130 km (81 mi)
- Width: 50 km (31 mi)

Geography
- Location within Alps
- Countries: Austria; Italy
- States: Salzburg; Carinthia; Tyrol; South Tyrol
- Range coordinates: 47°10′N 12°30′E
- Parent range: Central Eastern Alps

Geology
- Orogeny: Alpine
- Rock age: Paleozoic
- Rock types: Gneiss; Schist

The High Tauern (pl.; German: Hohe Tauern, Italian: Alti Tauri) are a mountain range on the main chain of the Central Eastern Alps, comprising the highest peaks east of the Brenner Pass. The crest forms the southern border of the Austrian states of Salzburg, Carinthia and East Tyrol, with a small part in the southwest belongs to the Italian province of South Tyrol. The range includes Austria's highest mountain, the Grossglockner at 3,798 metres (12,461 ft) above the Adriatic.

In the east, the range is adjoined by the Lower Tauern. For the etymology of the name, see Tauern.

== Geography ==
According to the Alpine Club classification of the Eastern Alps, the range is bounded by the Salzach valley to the north (separating it from the Kitzbühel Alps), the Mur valley and the Murtörl Pass to the east (separating it from the Lower Tauern), the Drava valley to the south (separating it from the Southern Limestone Alps), and the Birnlücke Pass to the west (separating it from the Zillertal Alps).

Its most important subgroups along the Alpine crest are (from West to East):

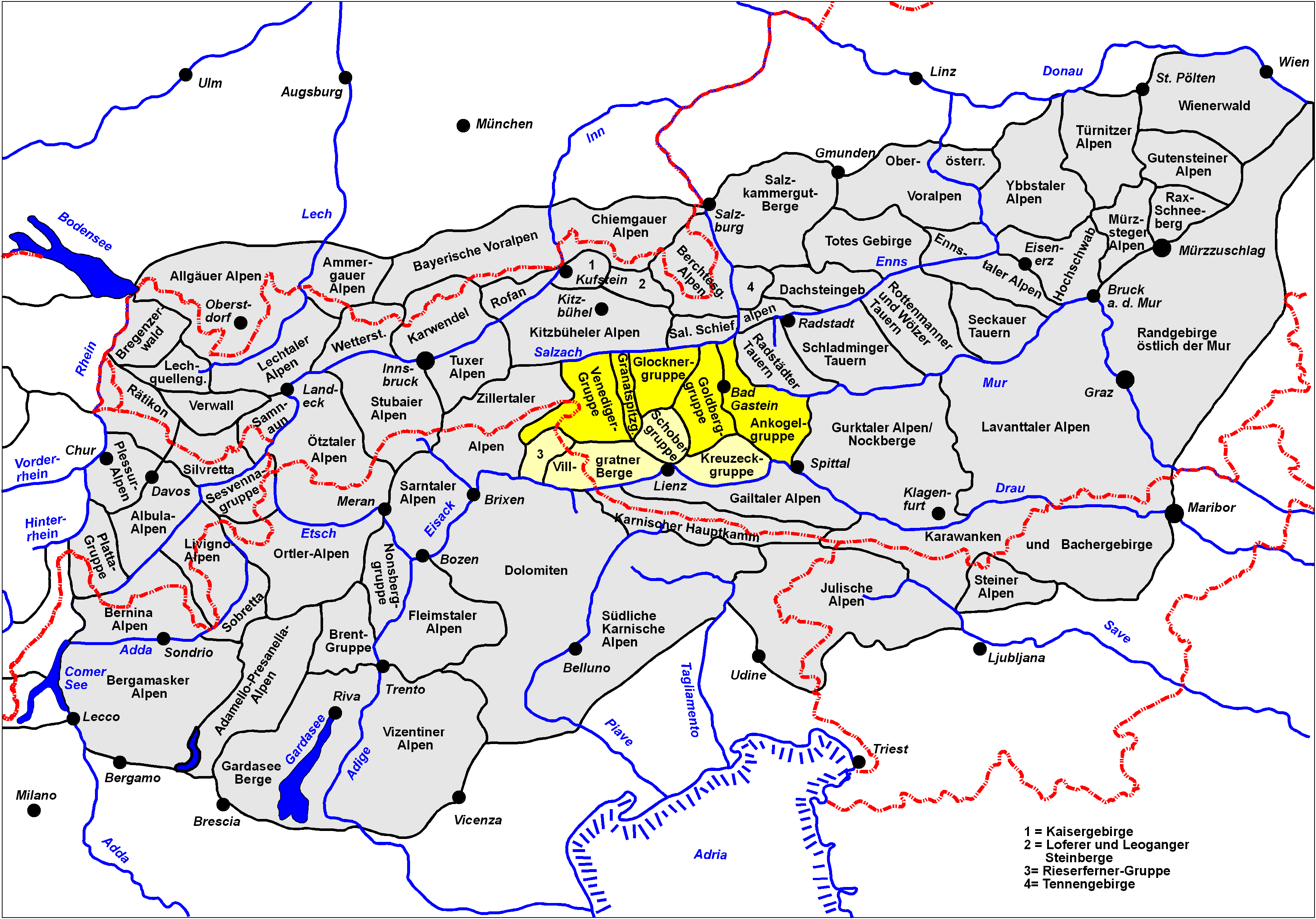
High Tauern subgroups

- Venediger Group (including Grossvenediger, 3,666 metres (12,028 ft), and Lasörling, 3,098 metres (10,164 ft))
- Granatspitze Group (Großer Muntanitz, 3,232 metres (10,604 ft), and Granatspitze, 3,086 metres (10,125 ft))
- Glockner Group (Grossglockner, 3,798 metres (12,461 ft))
- Goldberg Group (Hoher Sonnblick, 3,106 metres (10,190 ft))
- Ankogel Group (Hochalmspitze, 3,360 metres (11,020 ft), Ankogel, 3,246 metres (10,650 ft)) and Reisseck Group (Reisseck, 2,965 metres (9,728 ft))

The eastern end of the High Tauern is formed by the Hafner massif of the Ankogel Group, which includes the easternmost three-thousander peaks in the Alpine chain.

Further parts of the High Tauern south of the main crest of the Alps are (from West to East):

- Rieserferner Group (Hochgall, 3,436 metres (11,273 ft))
- Villgraten Mountains (Weiße Spitze, 2,962 metres (9,718 ft))
- Schober Group (including the Petzeck, 3,283 metres (10,771 ft) and Hochschober, 3,240 metres (10,630 ft))
- Kreuzeck Group (Mölltaler Polinik, 2,784 metres (9,134 ft))

== High Tauern National Park ==
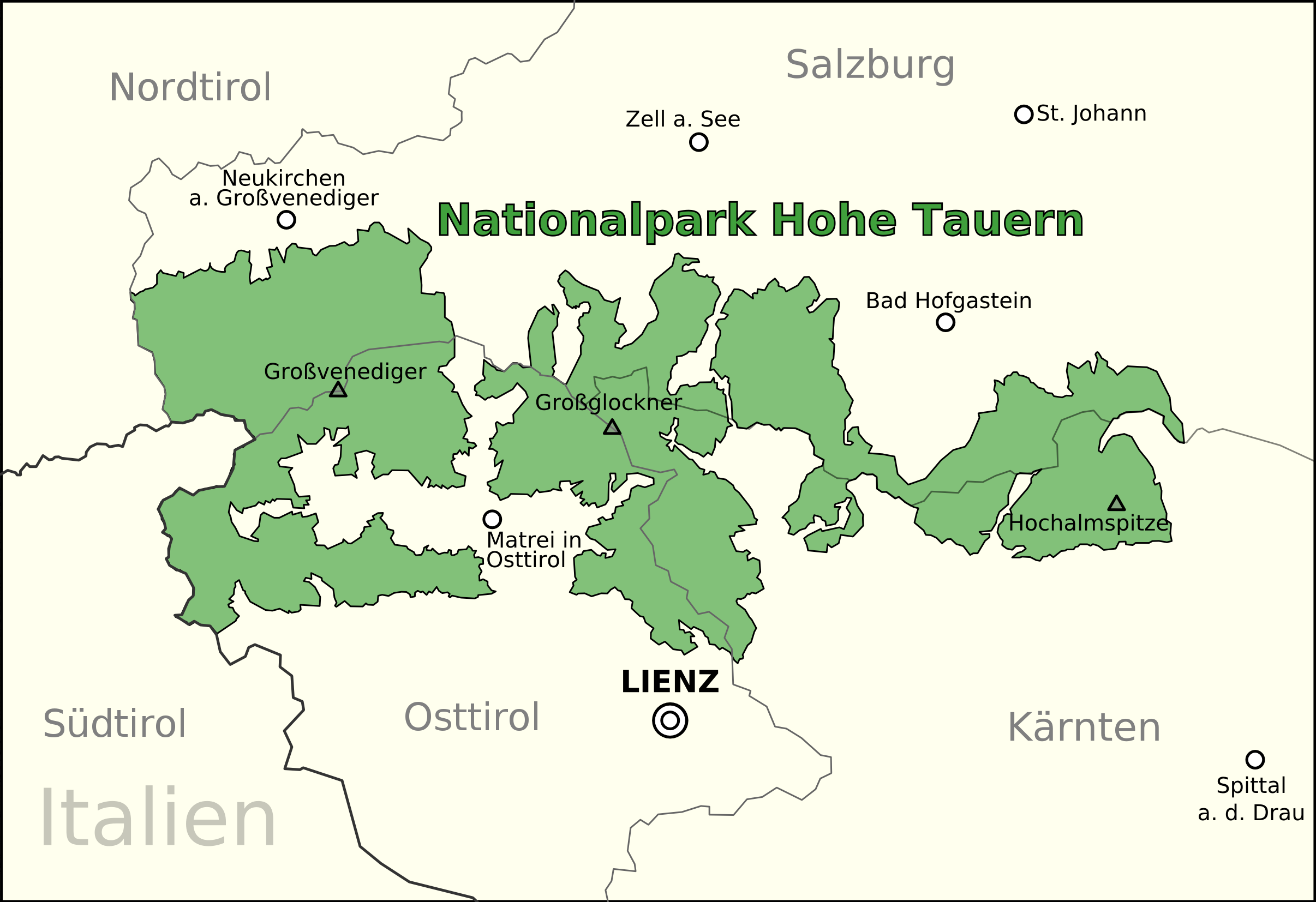
The national park area

Along 100 kilometres (62 mi) of the main chain stretches the High Tauern National Park (Nationalpark Hohe Tauern), to which the Austrian Alpine Club as freeholder and the three states of Carinthia, Salzburg and Tyrol have contributed territory.

== Peaks ==
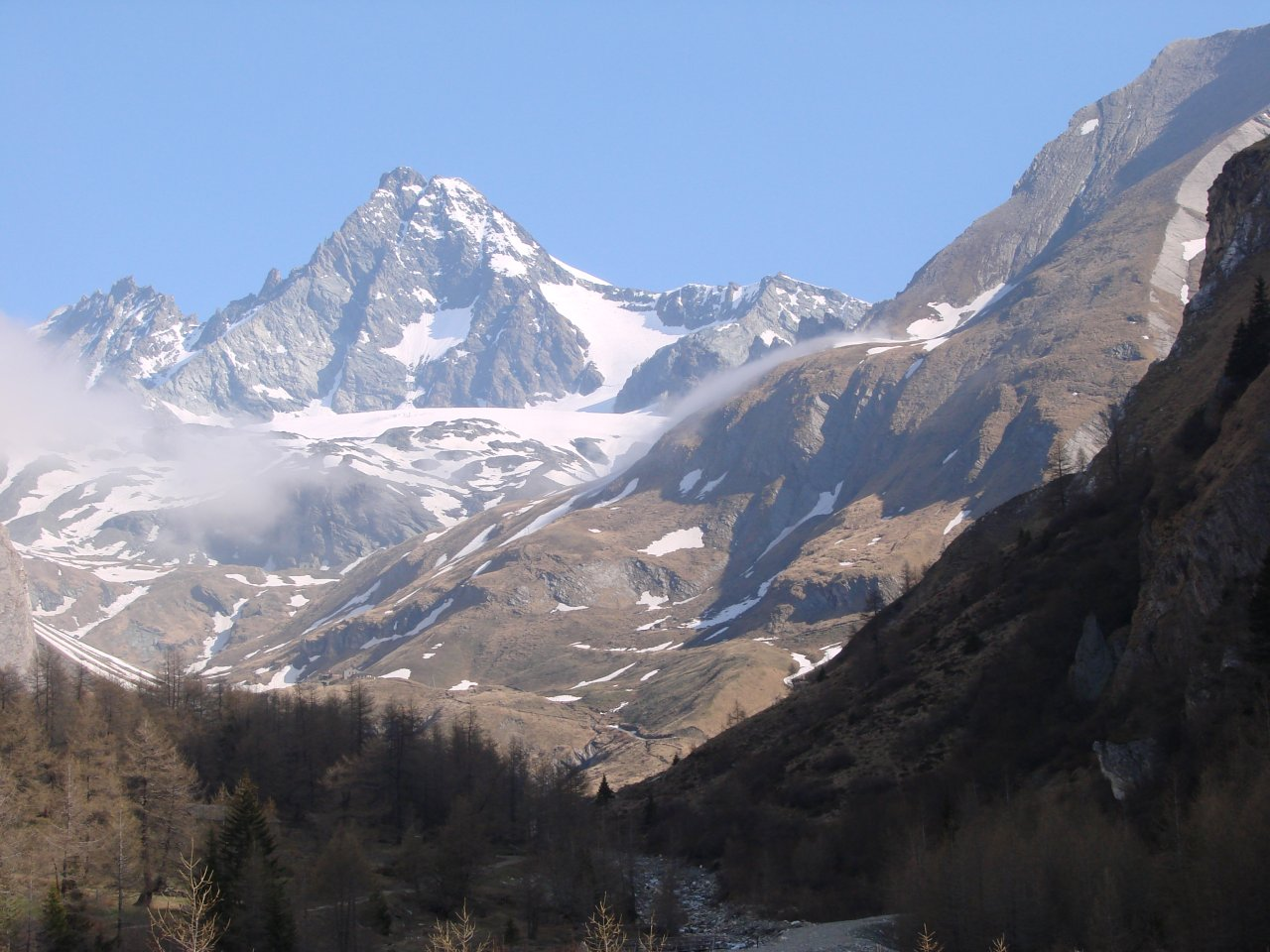
The Großglockner from the south

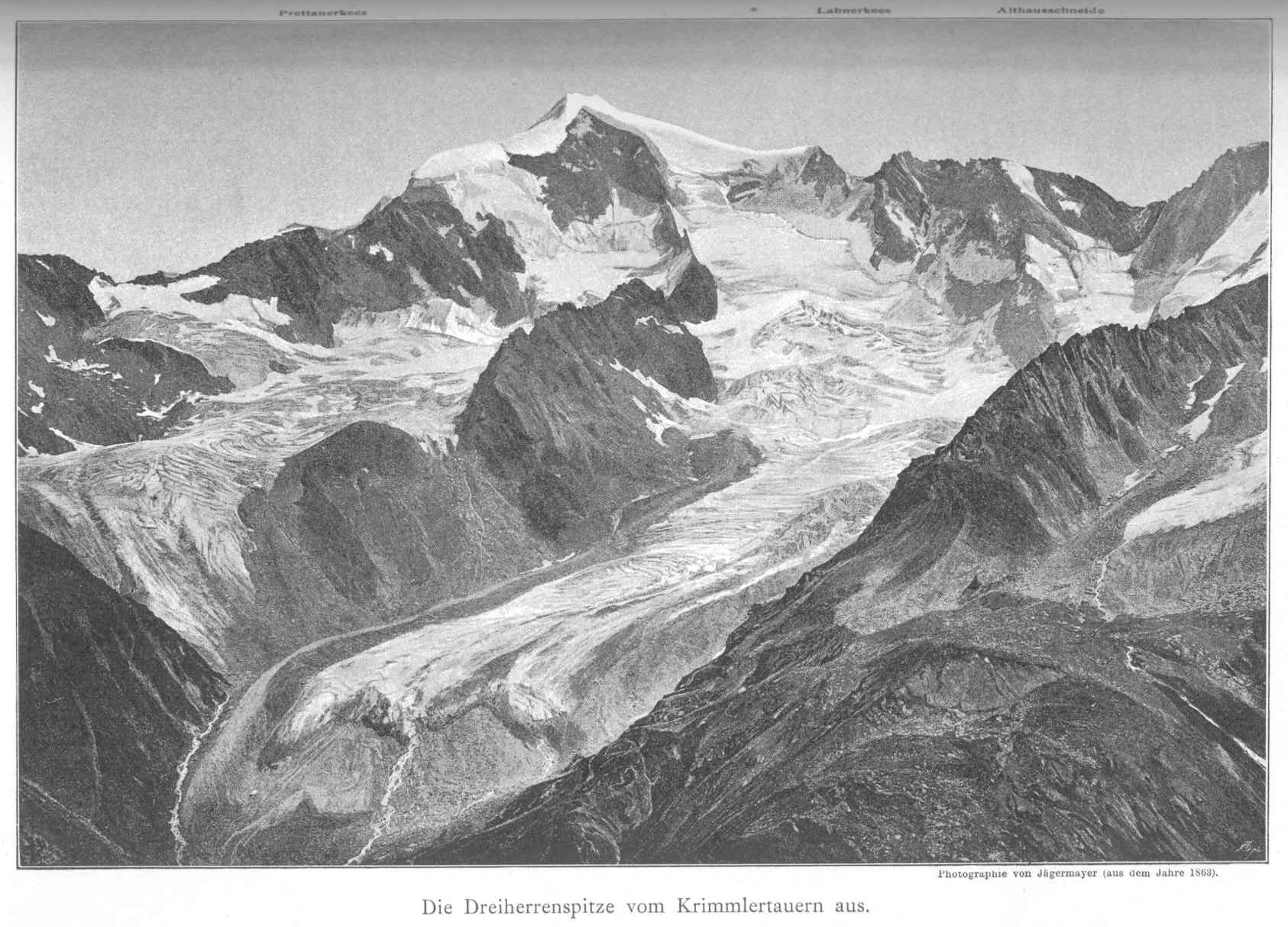
The Dreiherrnspitze from the west in the year 1890

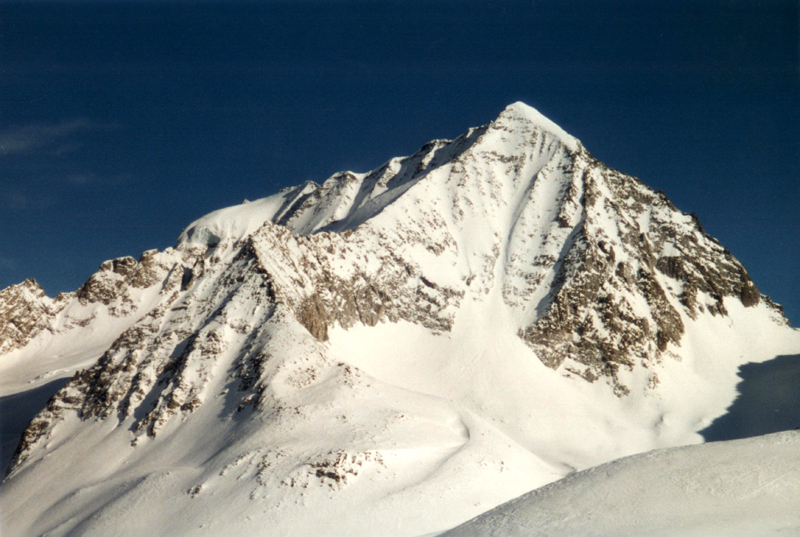
The Hochgall in winter from the west

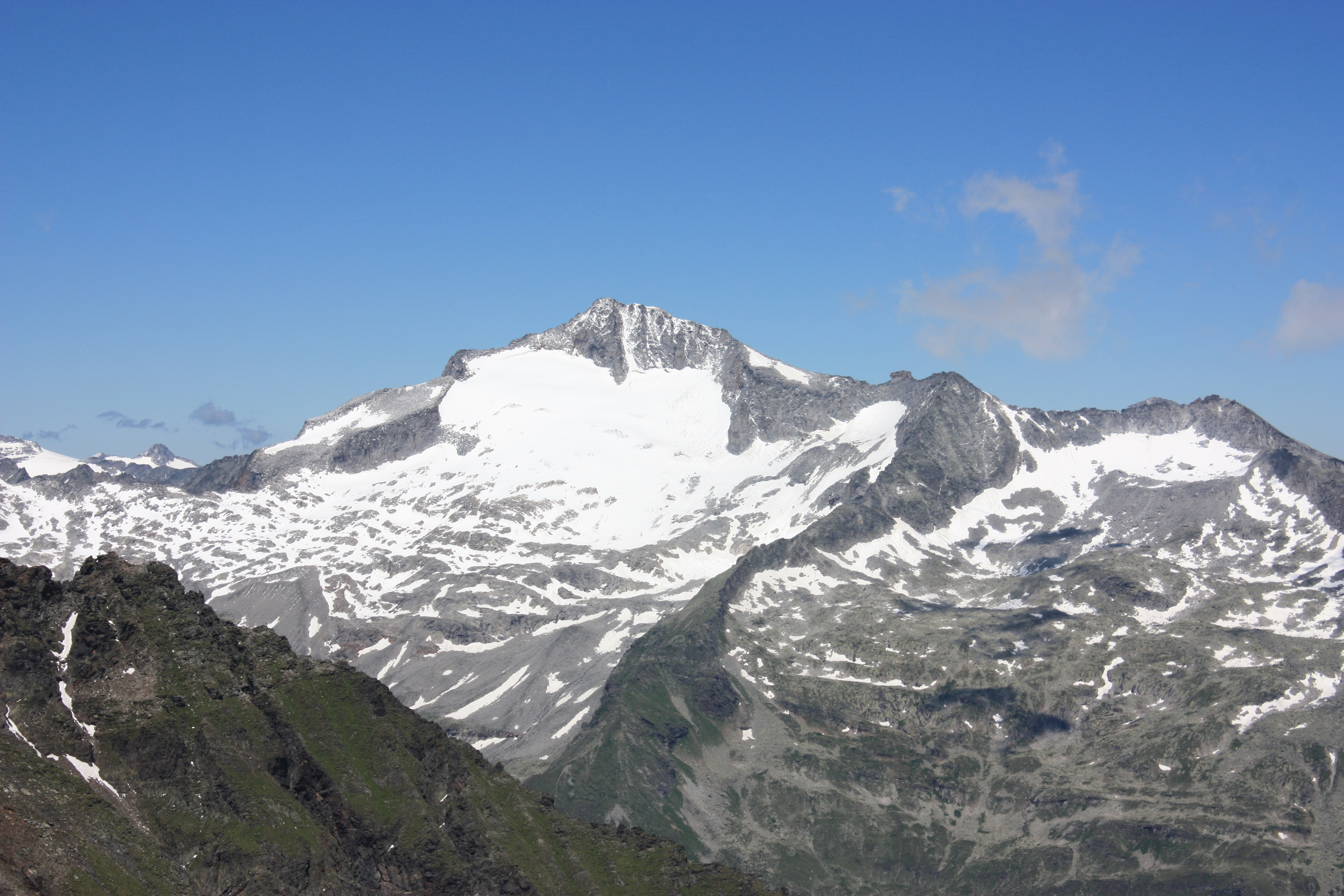
The Hochalmspitze from the south

The main peaks of the High Tauern are:

Peak	Group	Elevation (m/ft)		Prominence (m/ft)	
Großglockner	Glockner	3798	12,461	2423	7,949
Großvenediger	Venediger	3666	12,028	1199	3,934
Großes Wiesbachhorn	Glockner	3564	11,693	477	1,565
Dreiherrnspitze	Venediger	3499	11,480	591	1,939
Rötspitze	Venediger	3496	11,470	653	2,142
Johannisberg	Glockner	3453	11,329	277	909
Hochgall	Rieserferner	3436	11,273	1148	3,766
Hoher Eichham	Venediger	3371	11,060	325	1,066
Hoher Tenn	Glockner	3368	11,050	335	1,099
Malhamspitze	Venediger	3368	11,050	319	1,047
Hochalmspitze	Ankogel	3360	11,024	942	3,091
Großer Geiger	Venediger	3360	11,024	293	961
Schneebiger Nock	Rieserferner	3358	11,017	542	1,778
Fuscherkarkopf	Glockner	3331	10,928	489	1,604
Keeskogel	Venediger	3291	10,797	373	1,224
Schlieferspitze	Venediger	3290	10,794	513	1,683
Petzeck	Schober	3283	10,771	802	2,631
Roter Knopf	Schober	3281	10,764	556	1,824
Ankogel	Ankogel	3264	10,709	570	1,870
Hocharn	Goldberg	3254	10,676	678	2,224
Großer Hornkopf	Schober	3251	10,666	456	1,496
Hohe Fürlegg	Venediger	3243	10,640	385	1,263
Hochschober	Schober	3242	10,636	438	1,437
Großer Muntanitz	Granatspitze	3232	10,604	717	2,352
Hocheiser	Glockner	3206	10,518	577	1,893
Glödis	Schober	3206	10,518	370	1,214
Kitzsteinhorn	Glockner	3204	10,512	439	1,440
Durreck	Venediger	3135	10,285	626	2,054
Hoher Sonnblick	Goldberg	3106	10,196	271	889
Lasörling	Venediger	3098	10,164	490	1,608
Großer Hafner	Hafner	3068	10,066	868	2,848
Hoher Prijakt	Schober	3064	10,052	470	1,542
Weisse Spitze	Villgraten	2963	9,721	920	3,018
Mölltaler Polinik	Kreuzeck	2784	9,134	1580	5,184

== Tunnels and passes ==
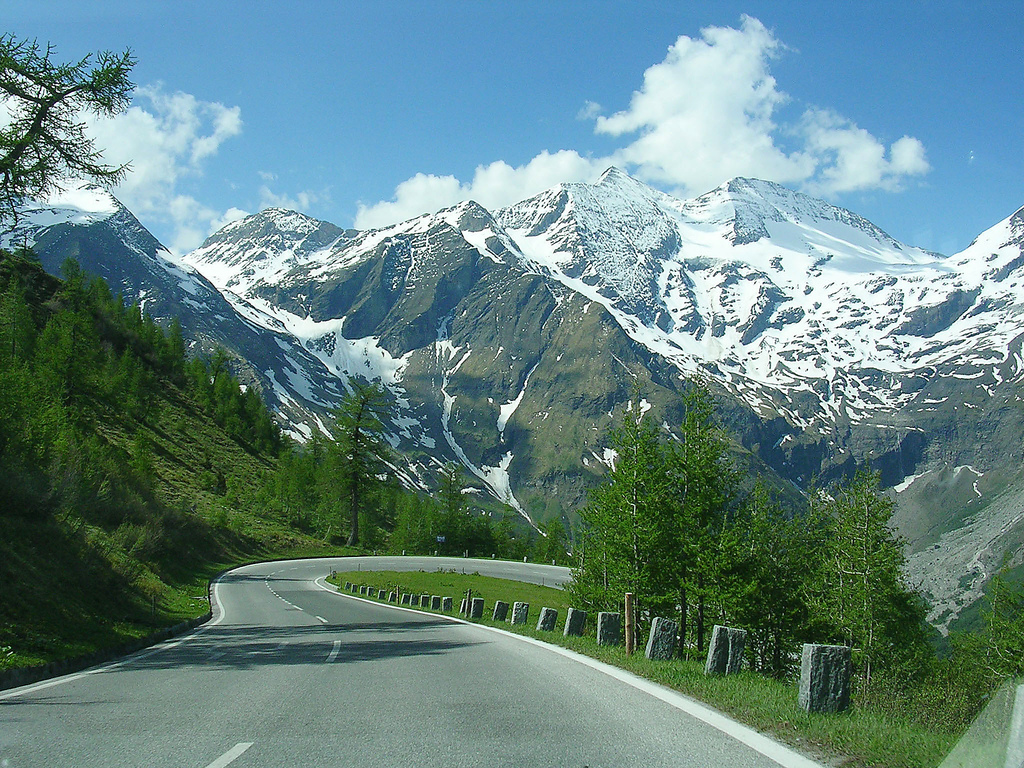
The Grossglockner toll road

The High Tauern are crossed by three tunnels:

- Tauern Railway Tunnel between Bad Gastein and Mallnitz, finished in 1906
- Katschberg Tunnel on A10 Tauern Autobahn (European route E55) leading from Sankt Michael im Lungau and the Tauern Road Tunnel to Rennweg
- Felbertauerntunnel on B108 Felbertauern Straße highway, between Mittersill and Matrei in Osttirol

The best-known mountain pass road of the High Tauern is the scenic Grossglockner High Alpine Road inaugurated in 1935, including a tunnel at an elevation of 2,505 metres (8,219 ft) under the Hochtor Pass (2,573 metres (8,442 ft)). East of it, the Katschberg Pass (1,641 metres (5,384 ft)) on B 99 Katschberg Straße highway parallel to the Katschberg Tunnel links Sankt Michael and Rennweg. Another road crosses the Staller Sattel between Sankt Jakob in Defereggen and Rasen-Antholz at 2,052 metres (6,732 ft).

Beside there are numerous bridle and footpaths, in part used since ancient times:

Mountain pass	Location	Type	Elevation (m/ft)	
Riffeltor	Kaprun to Heiligenblut	snow	3051	10,010
Bockkarscharte	Ferleiten to Heiligenblut	snow	3046	9994
Sonnblickscharte	Rauris to Heiligenblut	snow	2979	9774
Vörder Umbaltorl	Prägraten to Ahrntal	snow	2928	9607
Obersulzbachtorl	Prägraten to Wald im Pinzgau	snow	2926	9600
Untersulzbachtorl	Innergschlöß to Wald im Pinzgau	snow	2865	9400
Schwarzkopfscharte	Innergschlöß to Bramberg	snow	2850	9351
Prägratertorl	Prägraten to Defereggental	footpath	2846	9338
Glodistorl	Lienz to Kals	snow	2832	9292
Antholzerscharte	Rein in Taufers to Rasen-Antholz	snow	2820	9252
Krimmlertorl	Krimmler Achental to Obersulzbachtal	snow	2814	9233
Goldzechscharte	Rauris to Heiligenblut	snow	2810	9220
Kalsertorl	Lienz to Kals	snow	2803	9197
Ober Tramerscharte	Rauris to Döllach	snow	2802	9193
Kleine Elendscharte	Bad Gastein to Gmünd	snow	2739	8987
Kleine Zirknitzscharte	Rauris to Döllach	snow	2719	8921
Mallnitzerscharte	Mallnitz to Gmünd	snow	2677	8783
Große Elendscharte	Mallnitz to upper Maltatal	snow	2673	8770
Unter Pfandlscharte	Ferleiten to Heiligenblut	snow	2665	8744
Bergertorl	Ferleiten to Heiligenblut	footpath	2650	8695
Kaprunertorl	Kaprun to upper Stubachtal	snow	2635	8645
Virgner or Defereggertorl	Defereggental to Virgen	footpath	2617	8586
Backlenke or Trojerjoch	Defereggental to Prägraten	footpath	2613	8573
Felber Tauern	Matrei in Osttirol to Mittersill	bridle path	2540	8334
Kalser Tauern	Kals to Mittersill	footpath	2512	8242
Hohe Tauern	Bad Gastein to Mallnitz	bridle path	2463	8081
Niedere or Mallnitzer Tauern	Bad Gastein to Mallnitz	bridle path	2414	7920
Fuschertorl	Ferleiten to the Seidlwinkeltal	footpath	2405	7891
Klammljoch	Defereggental to Sand in Taufers	bridle path	2291	7517
Arlscharte	Gmünd to Sankt Johann im Pongau	footpath	2251	7386
Kals Matreiertorl	Kals to Matrei	bridle path	2206	7238
Stanz	Bad Gastein to Rauris	footpath	2103	6900

== See also ==
- Hohe Tauern window – Austrian Central Eastern Alps region with exposed Penninic nappes
- Lärchwandschrägaufzug
