= Landskron Castle (Carinthia) =

Medieval hill castle in Austria

Coordinates: 46°38′33″N 13°53′49″E

- Burg Landskron
- Carinthia, Austria
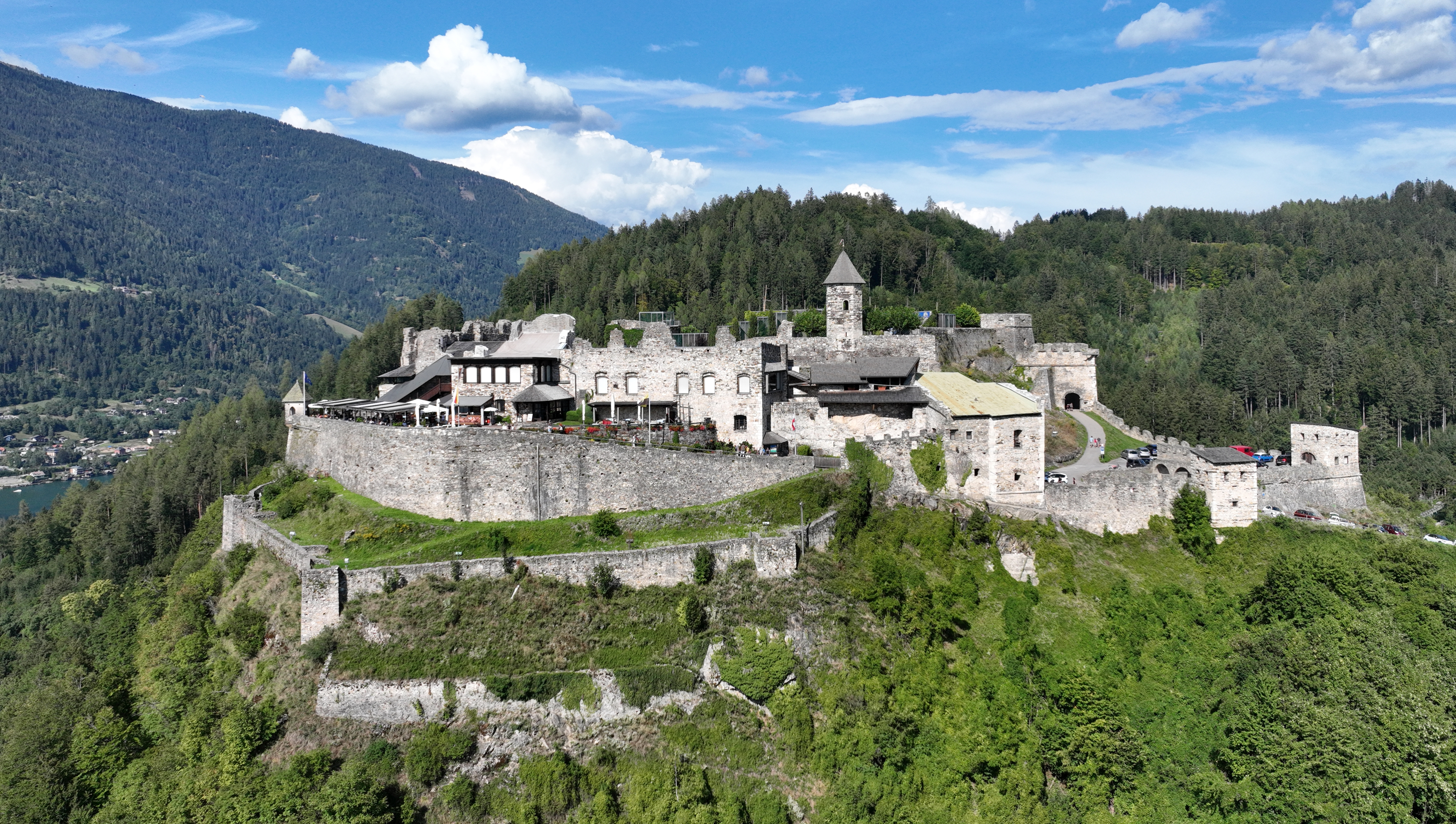
- Southwest view of Landskron Castle in Carinthia

Site information
- Type: Hill castle
- Owner: Private
- Open to the public: Yes
- Condition: Ruin

Site history
- Built: Early 14th century

Landskron Castle (German: Burg Landskron, Slovene: Grad Vajškra) is a medieval hill castle northeast of Villach in the state of Carinthia, Austria. Dating to the early 14th century, the castle ruins are located on a rock cone of the Ossiach Tauern range, at an elevation of 658 metres (2,159 ft) above sea level. Today Landskron Castle, its falconry centre conducting regular flying demonstrations, and the nearby macaque enclosure are major tourist destinations.

== History ==
Settled since the Hallstatt era, the estates around Lake Ossiach were first mentioned in an 878 deed issued by the East Frankish king Carloman of Bavaria, who granted them to the monastery of Altötting he had established shortly before. About 1024 the area was among the Carinthian possessions of one Count Ozi of the Chiemgau, probably a scion of the Otakar dynasty, who founded Ossiach Abbey nearby. A castle already existed, when in 1330 the estates were acquired by the Counts of Ortenburg.

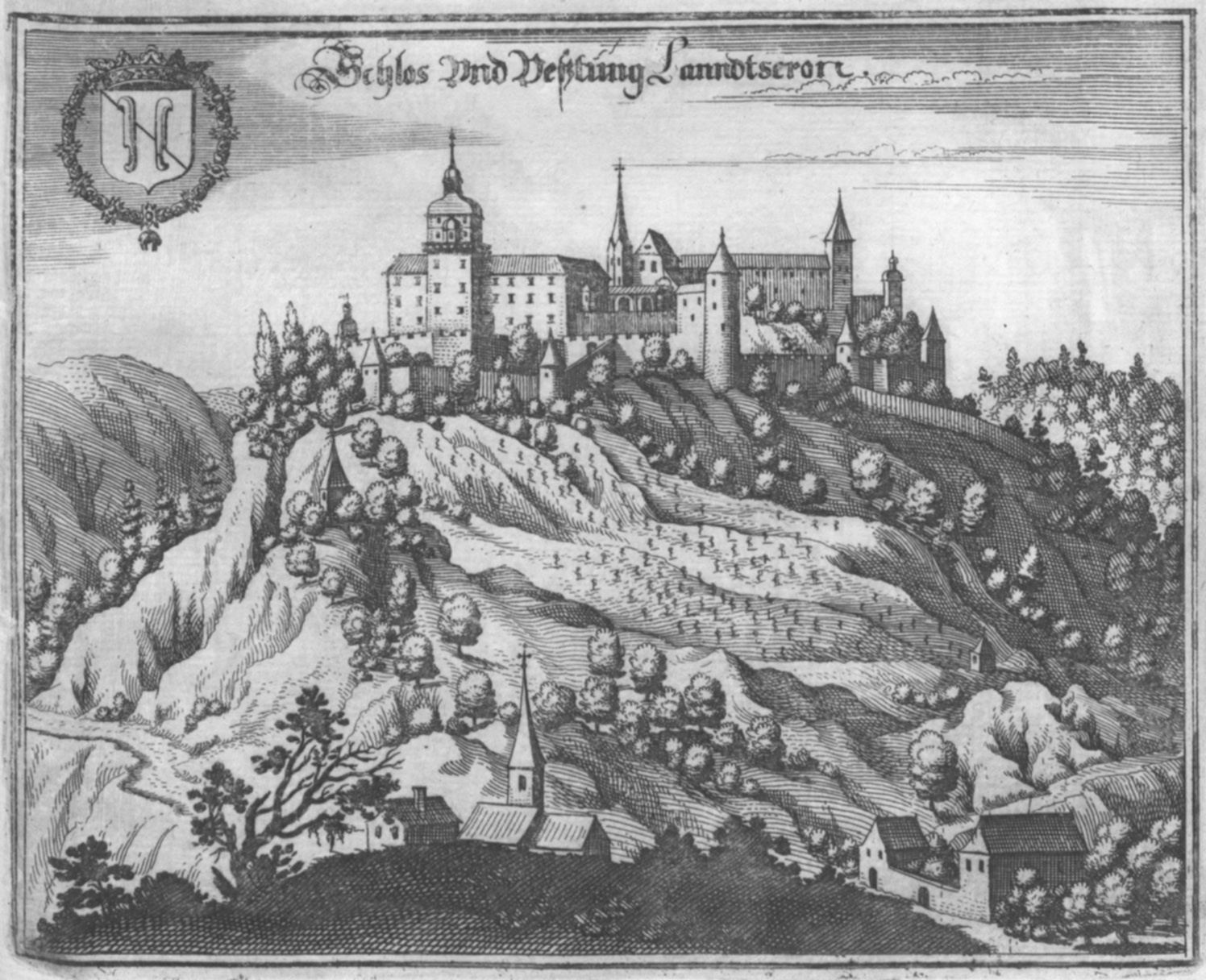
17th-century depiction by Matthäus Merian

Landskron itself was first mentioned in 1351, when the Habsburg duke Albert II of Austria, also Carinthian duke since 1335, purchased the fortress and had it rebuilt as an important stronghold within the Carinthian possessions of the Bamberg prince-bishops. Later, the Habsburg rulers temporarily gave it in pawn to Count Hermann II of Celje, heir of the Ortenburg dynasty in 1418, and the Lords of Stubenberg. In 1423 Andreas von Graben zu Sommeregg was named as celjenian Burgrave of Landskron. In 1511 Emperor Maximilian bestowed the estate to the Knightly Order of Saint George at Millstatt, while the fortress decayed.

In 1542 Emperor Ferdinand I finally sold Landskron Castle to the Ortenburg castellan Christoph von Khevenhüller, who made the castle his main residence and had it rebuilt in a lavish Renaissance style. In 1552 Khevenhüller even received the visit of Emperor Charles V, who, on the run from the Protestant troops of Elector Maurice of Saxony, had fled to Carinthia. Nevertheless, the Khevenhüllers, themselves Protestant, were stripped of Landskron Castle during the Thirty Years' War, by order of Emperor Ferdinand II in 1628.

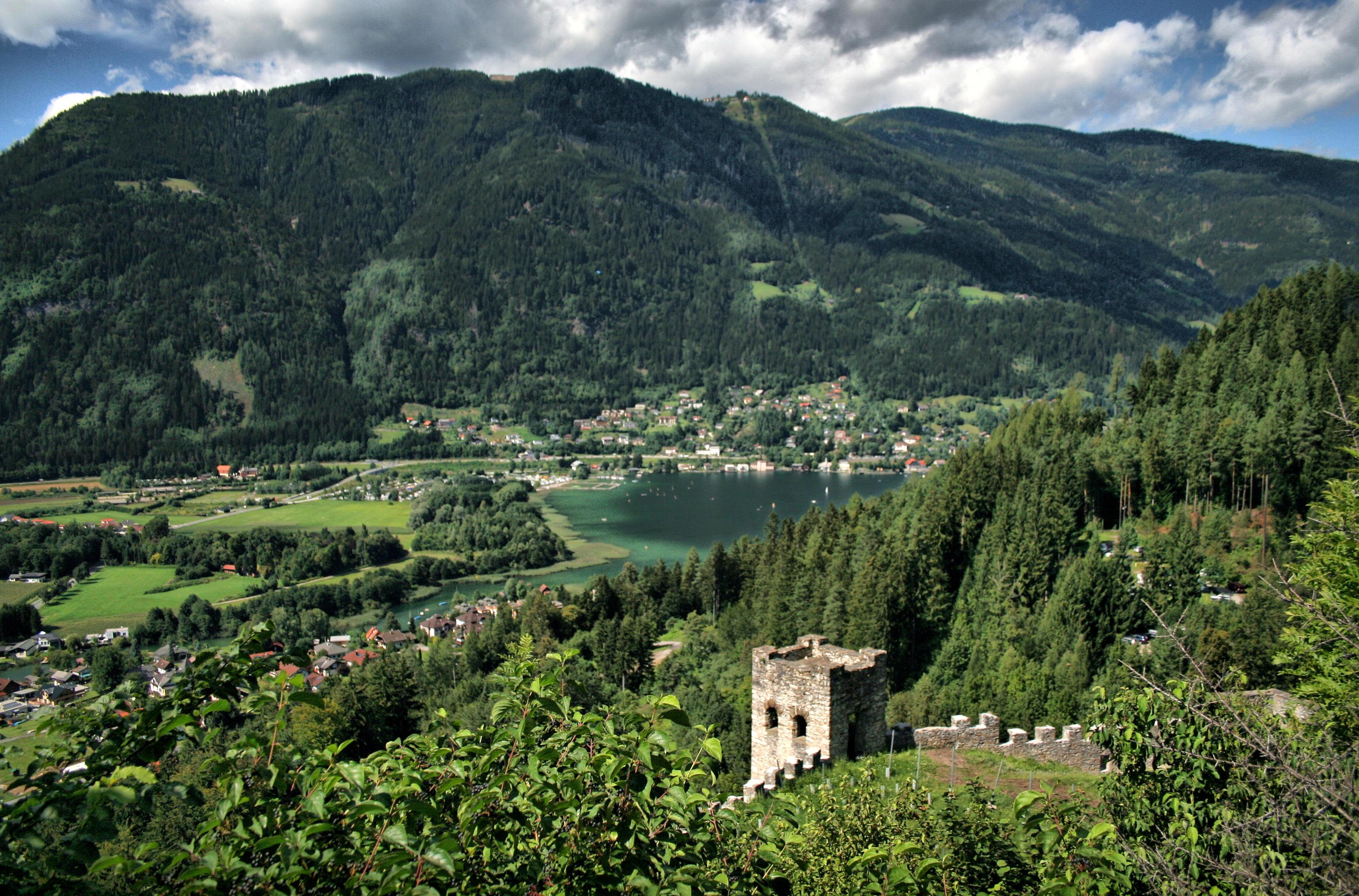
View from Landskron to Lake Ossiach

In 1639 the castle passed to the Dietrichstein comital dynasty. After the 1648 Peace of Westphalia the Khevenhüllers claimed it back and began a decades-long lawsuit, though without any success. While the Dietrichstein owners mostly resided at their Nikolsburg (Mikulov) estates in Moravia, the castle decayed. In 1812 a blaze caused by lightning finally devastated Landskron, which was not rebuilt and fell into ruins. From 1953 onwards, its remains were conserved and a restaurant was opened within its walls.

== See also ==
- List of castles in Austria
