= Taurach =

Taurach may refer to the following rivers in the Austrian state of Salzburg:

- Northern Taurach (German: Nördliche Taurach or Pongauer Taurach), tributary of the Enns in the Low Tauern mountains
- Southern Taurach (German: Südliche Taurach or Lungauer Taurach), tributary of the Mur in the Low Tauern
