= Großvenediger =

Mountain in the Alps

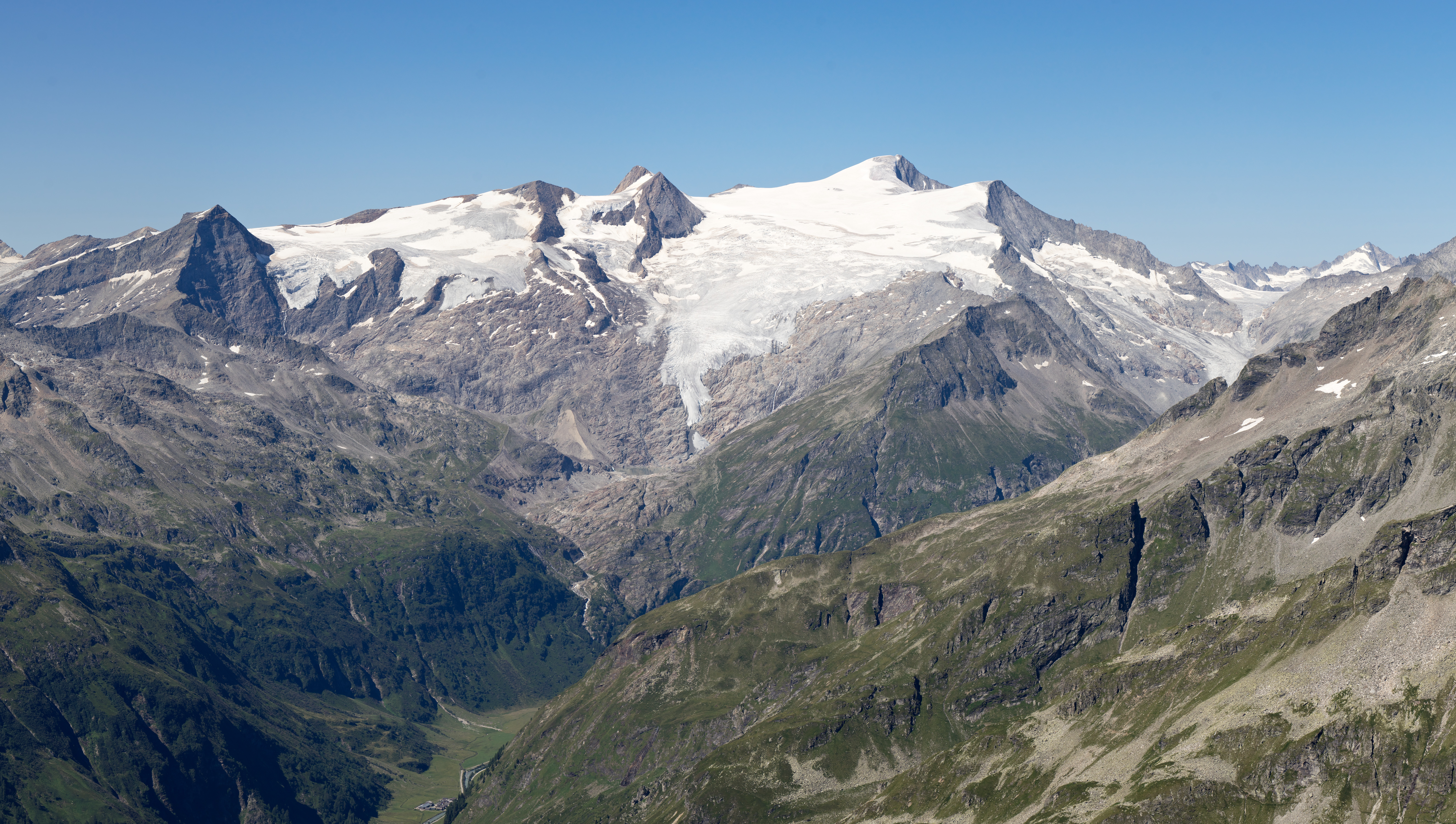
- Großvenediger seen from the east

Highest point
- Elevation: 3,666 m (12,028 ft)
- Prominence: 1,199 m (3,934 ft)
- Listing: Alpine mountains above 3000 m
- Coordinates: 47°6′34″N 12°20′44″E

Naming
- English translation: Great Venetian
- Language of name: German
- Pronunciation: German: [ˌɡʁoːsveˈneːdɪɡɐ]

Geography
- Location: Salzburg & East Tyrol, Austria
- Parent range: Hohe Tauern; Venediger Group
- Topo map: ÖK50 152

Climbing
- First ascent: 1841

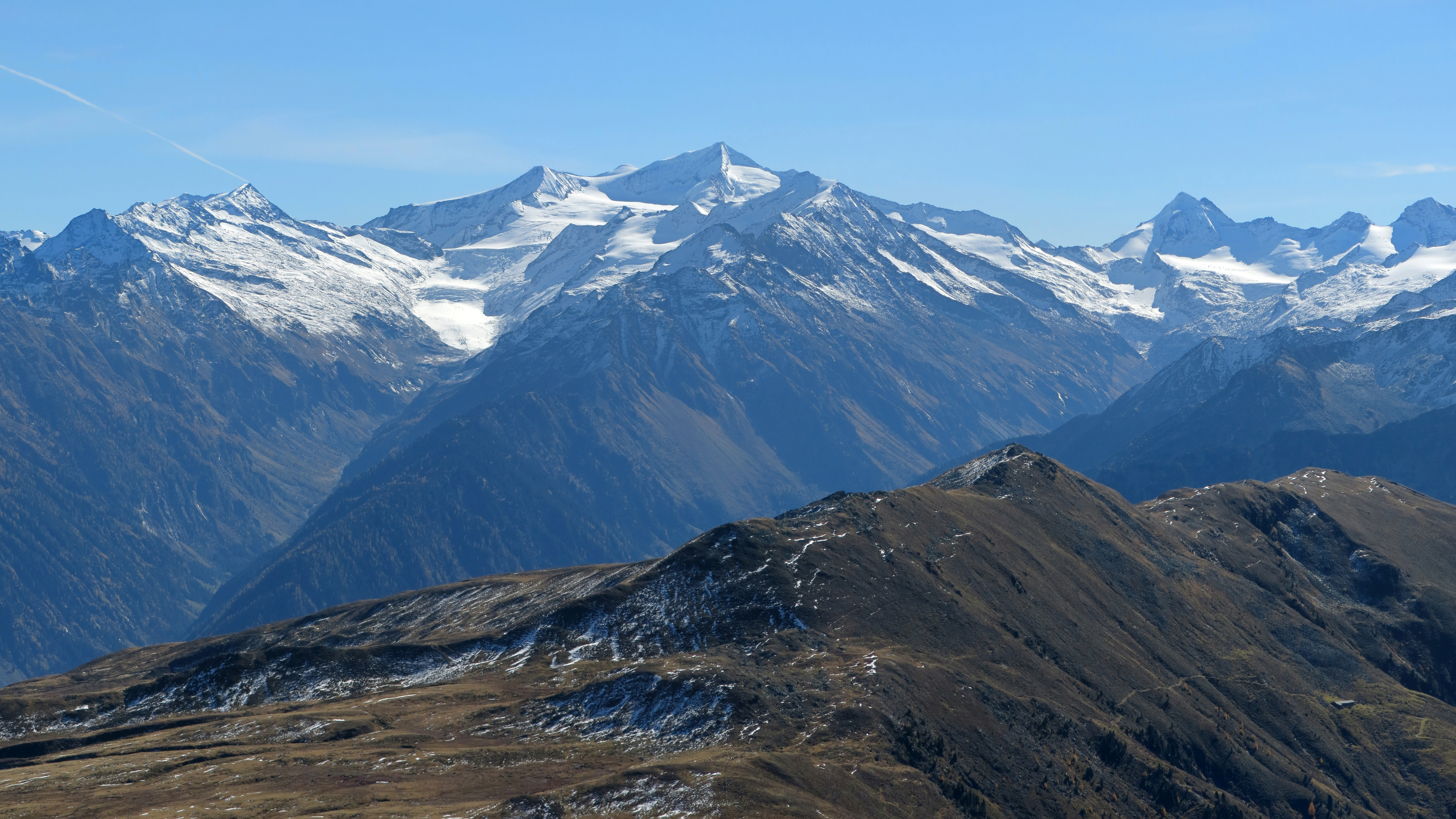
Großvenediger seen from the north

Großvenediger (German pronunciation: [ˈɡʁoːsveˌneːdɪɡɐ]) is the main peak of the Venediger Group within the Hohe Tauern mountain range, on the border of the Austrian state of Tyrol (East Tyrol) with Salzburg. It is generally considered to be Austria's fourth highest mountain (although it can be up to sixteenth if every subsidiary summit is counted). The summit, covered by glaciers, is part of the Hohe Tauern National Park.

== Name ==
Originally known as Stützerkopf, the name Großvenediger (English: Great Venetian) is first recorded from a 1797 border survey. The origin of this name is unclear, probably deriving from Venetian merchants on their way over the mountain passes. An alternative theory is that the view from the summit may reach as far as Venice, some 200 km (120 mi) away, however, this is not in accordance with the facts.

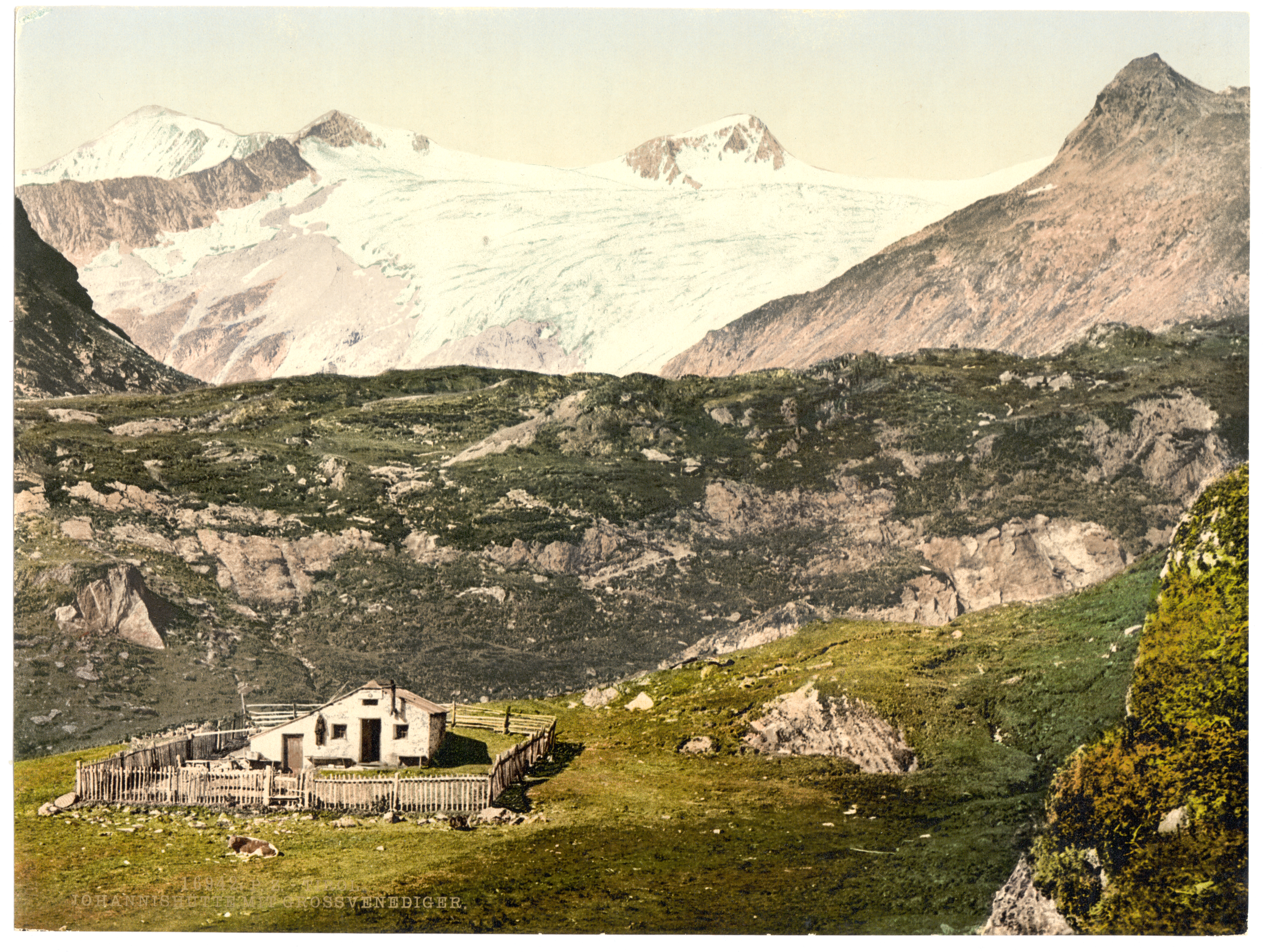
Johannishütte with Großvenediger, photochrom print, c. 1900

The author and mountaineer Ignaz von Kürsinger (1795–1861), one of the first climbers of the Großvenediger in 1840, coined the epithet weltalte Majestät (World-old Majesty).

== Climbing history ==
Several attempts were made in the early 19th century to reach the Großvenediger summit, after the first ascent of the nearby Großglockner in 1800. On 9 August 1828, an expedition of 17 men, including the Habsburg archduke John of Austria, failed in their attempt to climb Großvenediger due to an avalanche.

It wasn't until 3 September 1841, forty years after the first ascent of the Großglockner, that a team led by Josef Schwab made the first successful attempt on the Großvenediger summit, starting at the northern foot in Neukirchen in the Salzach Valley, climbing up southwards along the Obersulzbach tributary valley and over the Stierlahnerwand. Other members of the team included Ignaz von Kürsinger, Paul Rohregger, Anton von Ruthner and Franz Spitaler. Of the 40 participants, only 26 finally reached the summit, the others having stayed back due to fatigue.

Today several mountain huts serve as basis for summit ascents, though mountaineering on nival level can be dangerous in view of numerous crevasses.

== Main routes to the summit ==
The Großvenediger can be reached via three different common routes (north, east and south).

=== Northern Ascent ===
Of the three different routes, this is the least travelled. Compared to the other two main routes, one starts from the state of Salzburg rather than from Tyrol. The starting point is the Kürsingerhütte and the ascent is from the Sulzau via the Berndlalm and Postalm.

=== Eastern Ascent ===
The east ascent takes about eight hours, where one puts about 2,200 vertical meters behind themselves. Without any break time, this could be achieved in around four hours. This is a light- to medium-difficulty high alpine tour.

The starting point here is the Matreier Tauernhaus. From there you march on a gravel road to Innergschlöß to the Venedigerhaus (1691 m). After half an hour towards the end of the valley, a steep and very strenuous ascent follows. The route then meanders to the New Prager Hut (2796 m). The route then follows the glacier to the west, where extra caution is required due to the crevasses. The final ascent becomes very steep and the route goes to the summit ridge, which is becoming increasingly narrow.

=== Southern Ascent ===
The ascent from the Defreggerhaus is considered moderate, although the risk of crevasses and the narrow ridge crossing to the summit should not be underestimated. Due to the relatively 'easy' ascent, this is the most popular of the three common routes.

Starting from the Defreggerhaus, the route goes north along the 'Moränenrückens' up to the 'Mullwitzaderl'. It follows an incline to the 'Rainertörl', continuing south below the Rainerhorn and going a bit steeper to the Rainertörl (3421 m). The way leads to the northwest, slightly rising to the steep ascent of the Venediger and finally reaches the broad shoulder and narrow ridge to the summit.

All three climbs on the Großvenediger are technically not difficult, but the higher elements pose a risk, as they lead across a glacier terrain full of crevasses. Depending on the conditions, these are sometimes difficult to recognise and are also a danger in ski tours.

== See also ==
- List of the highest mountains in Austria
