= Virgen =

- Municipality
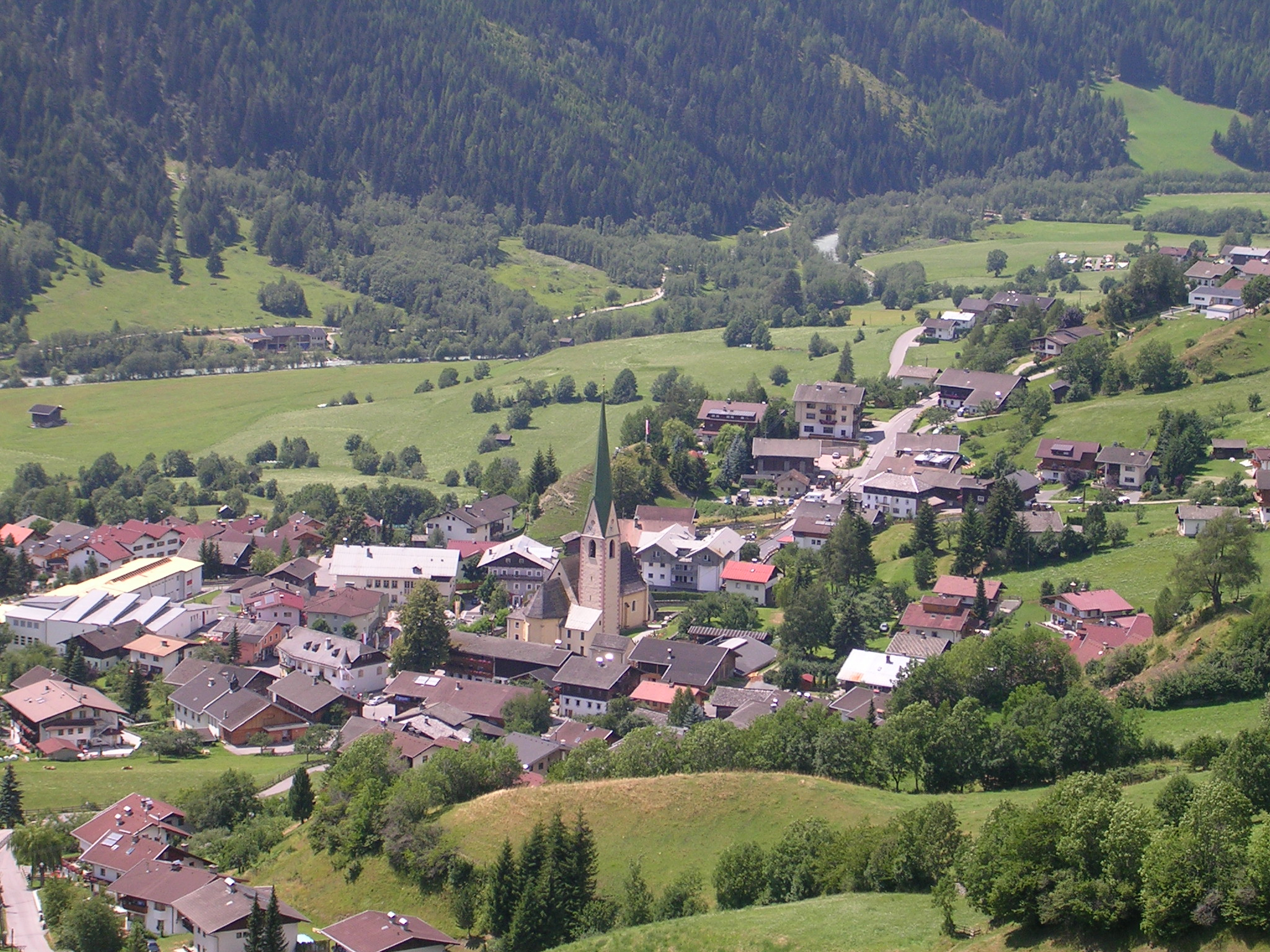

- Coat of arms

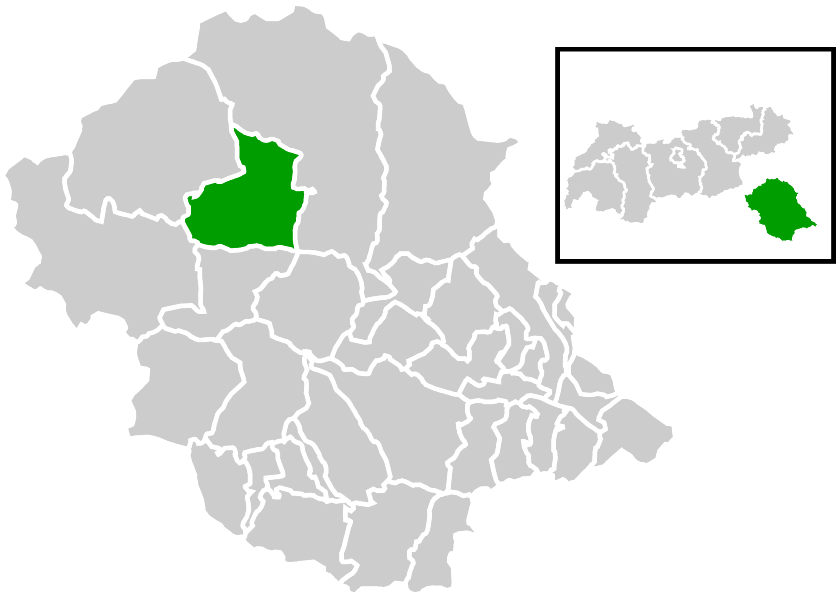
- Location within Lienz district

- Location within Austria
- Coordinates: 47°00′12.5″N 12°27′28.5″E
- Country: Austria
- State: Tyrol
- District: Lienz

Government
  - Mayor: Dietmar Ruggenthaler

Area
  - Total: 88.81 km^{2} (34.29 sq mi)
- Elevation: 1,194 m (3,917 ft)

Population (2018-01-01)
  - Total: 2,199
  - Density: 24.76/km^{2} (64.13/sq mi)
- Time zone: UTC+1 (CET)
  - Summer (DST): UTC+2 (CEST)
- Postal code: 9972
- Area code: 04874
- Vehicle registration: LZ
- Website: www.virgen.at

Virgen is a municipality in the district of Lienz in the Austrian state of Tyrol. It includes part of the Virgen valley in the Venediger Group mountain range, and extensive parts of the municipality are in High Tauern National Park. The history of the area goes back to 500 BC, when copper mining played an important role. After the end of the Roman period Slavs settled in the Virgen valley, who were gradually assimilated by Baiuvarii settlers beginning in the 8th century. The simultaneous Christianization of the area led to the creation of one of the first parishes in the region. During the Middle Ages Virgen was a part of Carinthia and the County of Gorizia, and by 1500 it was annexed by Tyrol. With a population of 2,200 (as of January 1, 2020), Virgen is the fifth largest community in east Tyrol in terms of population. Agriculture and tourism both play important economic roles, but a lack of jobs and structural problems lead to a very high commuter rate. Virgen has won awards for being the most beautiful municipality in Tyrol several times.

== Geography ==
=== Location ===
Virgen lies in northern East Tyrol and has an area of 88.8 km^{2} being the sixth largest municipality in Lienz district. With around 42 km^{2} being part of High Tauern National Park, almost half of the municipality's area is under nature preservation. Virgen comprises the eastern part of the Virgen valley, through which the Isel river flows, from the Isel gorge to the village (part) of Mitteldorf. Because the Isel is pushed to the right side of the valley by the Virgen alluvial cone, all the settlements in the valley are to the left of the river with the exception of Welzelach. The highest point in the municipality is Hoher Eichham (3371 m) in the Venediger Group. Also, the highest mountain in the Lasörling Group, the Lasörling (3098 m), is on the border of the municipality.

=== Local Communities ===
Virgen consists of seven subdivisions with seven hamlets. Starting from the East, going along the state highway, the first subdivision is Mitteldorf with the hamlet of Bach. Further along the road is the Virgen village subdivision, the main center of the municipality, with the hamlet of Weite. Northeast of Virgen center is the subdivision of Mellitz on the stream of the same name, and northwest on the Virgen stream is the subdivision of Göriach with the Marin hamlet. Göriach and Mellitz are however partially merged with Virgen center. West of the municipality center is the Obermauern subdivision on the Nillbach stream, and south of Obermauern is the Niedermauern subdivision with the Gries und Rain hamlet. The westernmost subdivision is Welzelach. In addition to the subdivisions and hamlets, there are also high altitude individual farms such as Sonnberg above Mellitz, east of Obermauern.

The town of Matrei in Osttirol, with the second largest population in Lienz district, functions as an economic, social, and medical center in Northeast Tyrol and is of particular importance to Virgen.

=== Neighboring Communities ===
The municipality of Virgen is bordered in the south by the Lasörling Group separating it from the Deferegen valley and the municipalities of (from west to east) St. Jakob, St. Veit, and Hopfgarten. To the west of Virgen is Prägraten municipality, and to the north and east is the market town of Matrei.

=== Land Use ===
The largest part of the municipality's area cannot be used due to its high alpine location in the High Tauern mountain range. Around 41% of the area is barren with sparse vegetation. Secondly, alpine pastures and meadows take up 29% of Virgen's area. Forests in Virgen also play an important part. With just over 20% of the land area forests make up the third largest type of land. All other land types make up a proportionally insignificant area. Meadows make up 9%, while farmland and gardens put together make up less than 1%.

=== Geology ===
The northern part of the municipality, the Virgen North Chain, is geologically part of the Alpine shale layer. This slate layer, which lies above a gneiss layer, consists of multiple layers of shale one on top of the other. The upper shale layer consists of calcareous shale and calcareous phyllite, which are recognizable by pale yellow and lead-grey colors or their characteristic "panel" or "board" shape. Directly under this upper layer is an under layer, which is horizontally articulated and made of greenschist. Due to a favorable hillside location and susceptibly to erosion, fertile soils have formed over the shale layer which are suitable for alpine farming. The south on the municipality including the Lasörling Group belongs to an old crystalline zone. This zone consists of mica, gneiss, and calcareous shale. Some parts also consist of garnet, calcareous quartzite, and small collections of limestone and dolomite. In the east of the municipality are small parts of the Matreier zone, which consists of numerous, intermingled, rocks (phyllite, quartzite, gypsum, bright dolomite and dark limestone, greywacke, and greenschist) of various origins. The Matreier zone runs in a narrow band from Mitteldorf to Berger Törl.

=== Mountains ===
Virgen lies within the Venediger Group between the Virgen North Chain in the north and the Lasörling Group in the south, whose main ridges mark the borders in the north and the south. There are several mountains over 3000 meters directly on the borders of Virgen. The tallest mountains in the Virgen North Chain on the municipality's border are Hoher Eichham (3371 m), Säulkopf (3209 m), and Ochsenbug (3007 m). The most important summits in the Lasörling Group on Virgen's border are the Lasörling (3098 m), Berger Kogel (2656 m), and Donnerstein (2725 m).

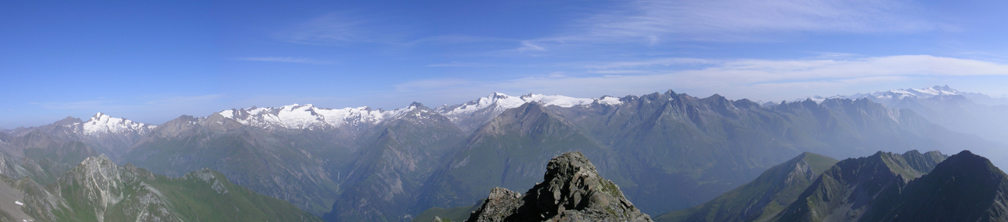
Panorama of the Venediger Group over the Virgen Valley from the Lasörling.

=== Rivers and Bodies of Water ===
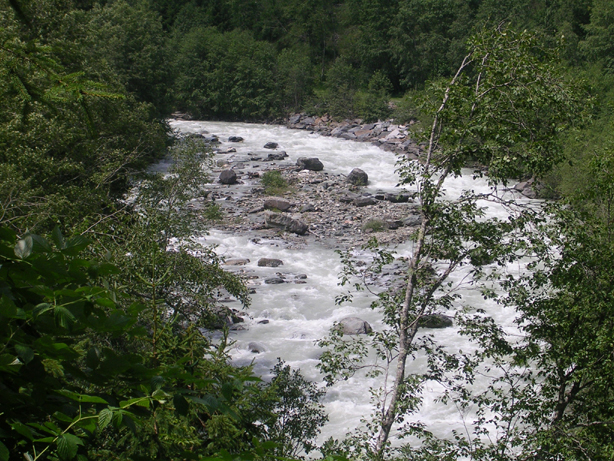
The Isel near Mitteldorf

The most important river in Virgen municipality is the Isel, which enters the municipality through the Isel gorge and flows east. The Isel drains the right side of the Virgen Valley by the Virgen alluvial cone, which means there is hardly any space for settlement on the right bank of the river. In its course through the municipality ten streams drain into the Isel. The left tributaries, fed from the Virgen North Chain, are the Nillbach, Virger Stream, Mellitzbach, and the Mitteldorfer Stream, and the right tributaries from the Lasörling Group are the Berger Stream, Mullitzbach, Fratnikbach, Saumitzbach, and the Arnitzbach. There are also several mountain lakes within the municipality, with the Berger See and the Zupalsee being the most well-known.

=== Climate ===
Virgen, due to its location between the Virgen North Chain and the Lasörling Group, has a favorable climate. This is indicated in the name Virgen, which is derived from Slavic, that means sunny place. The reason for Virgen's sunny location, which is marketed as the "Merano of East Tyrol", is the orientation of the Virgen Valley, through which the path of the Sun follows. As a result, Virgen loses only a third of its total possible sunshine duration in December, and only a seventh in June. Comparatively, the sunshine loss in the Ötztal is as high as between one and two thirds. Due to the mountains in the north, Virgen is shielded from the cold Tauernwind, which reaches unprotected Matrei to the south. Since cold air can flow down the Isel, there are hardly any cold lakes in Virgen. The greatest rainfall in Virgen occurs during June and July. On average Virgen receives 900 mm of precipitation per year, where the precipitation in higher locations is strongly increased. Virgen receives relatively little snow in terms of height and consistency of the snow cover (around 110 days). January and February are the driest months. The average annual temperature in Virgen between 2000 and 2002 was 6.8°C when January was the coldest month at -2.9°C and August was the warmest at 15.9°C.

== Population ==
Historical population
Year	Pop.	±%
1869	1,390	—
1880	1,358	−2.3%
1890	1,276	−6.0%
1900	1,247	−2.3%
1910	1,136	−8.9%
1923	1,079	−5.0%
1934	1,149	+6.5%
1939	1,121	−2.4%
1951	1,275	+13.7%
1961	1,474	+15.6%
1971	1,687	+14.5%
1981	1,897	+12.4%
1991	1,957	+3.2%
2009	2,163	+10.5%
