= Lasörling Group =

Mountain range of the Venediger Group in Austria

Coordinates: 46°58′N 12°21′E

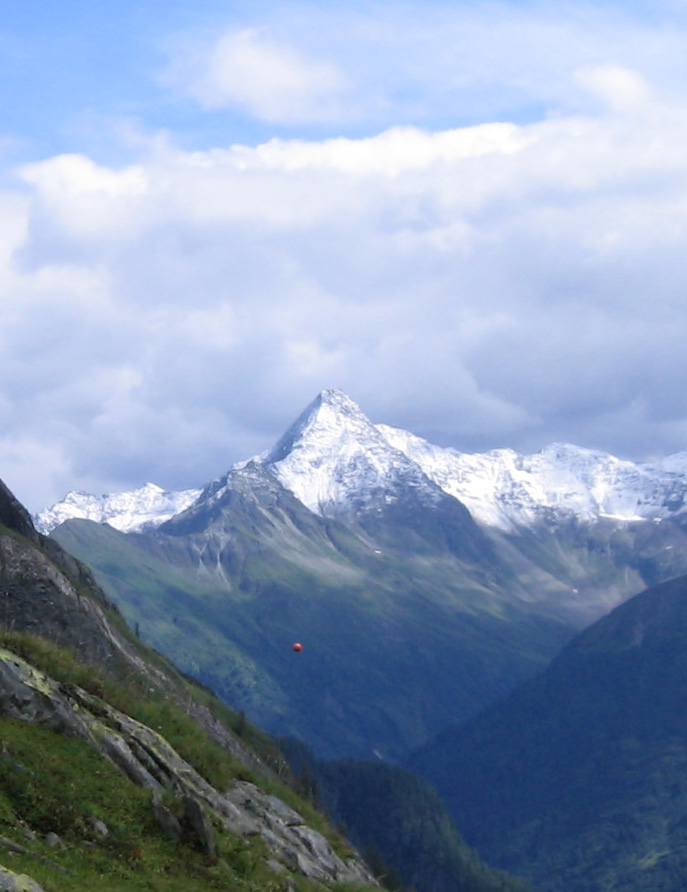
The Lasörling from the northwest

The Lasörling Group (German: Lasörlinggruppe) is a subgroup of the Central Alps within the Eastern Alps. The boundaries of this mountain range in East Tyrol are principally delineated by the valleys of the Virgental in the north and the Defereggental in the south. According to the agreement by the Alpine clubs in 1984 the Lasörling Group is part of the Venediger Group, forming its southeastern part. In older classifications of the Eastern Alps, the Lasörling Group was counted as part of the Defereggen Mountains (Villgraten Mountains). The highest summit of the Lasörling Group is the Lasörling (3,098 m (AA)) which gives the range its name. Sometimes the neighbouring Panargenkamm is also seen as part of the Lasörling group. Its highest mountain is the Keeseck (3,173 m (AA)).

Municipalities within which the Lasörling Group falls are Matrei in Osttirol, Virgen and Prägraten am Großvenediger in the Virgental, and (Hopfgarten, Sankt Veit and Sankt Jakob) in the Defereggental.

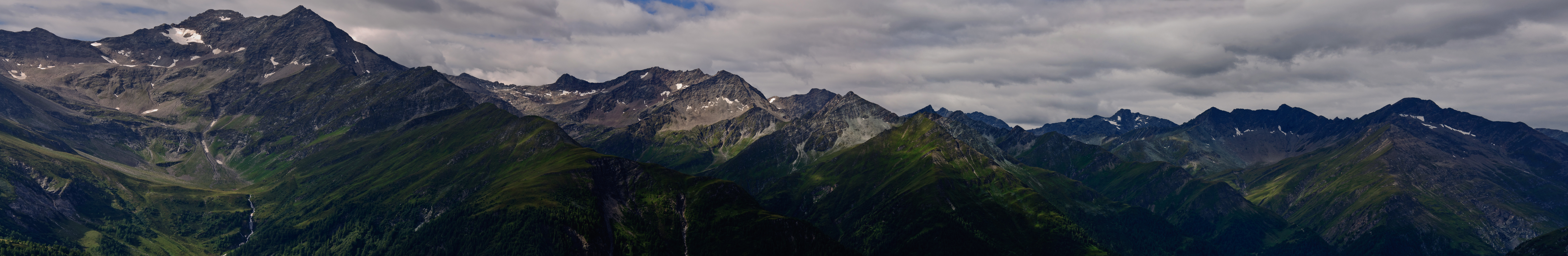
Panorama of the Lasörling Group seen from the entrance to the Timmeltal valley

== Gallery ==
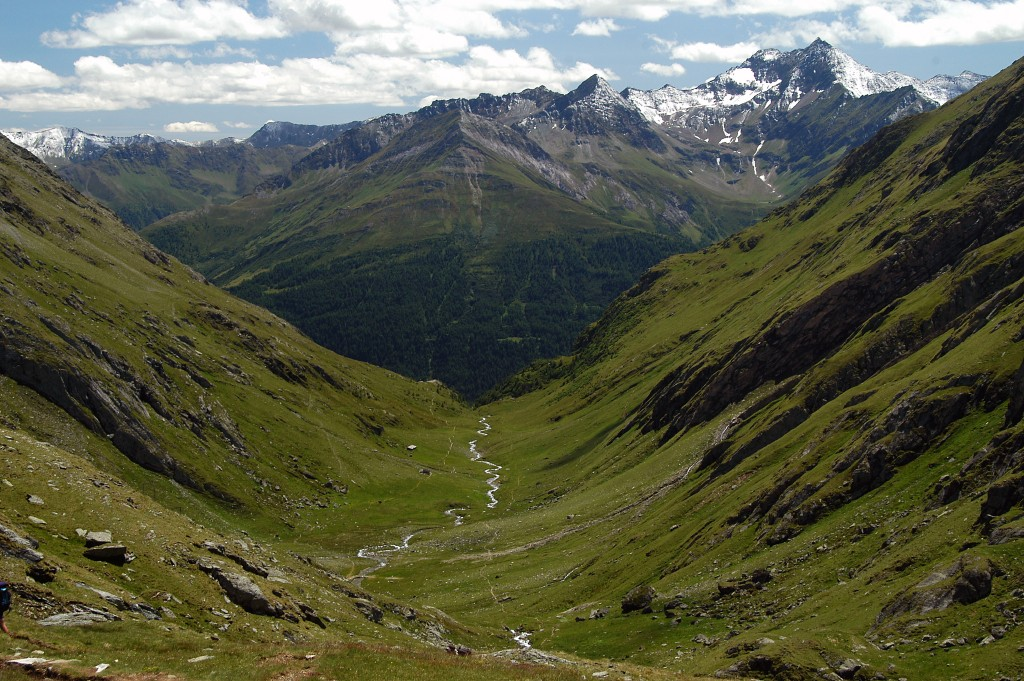
The Lasörling Group seen from the Eissee Hut and the Timmeltal valley (on the axis of the valley is the Berger Kogel)

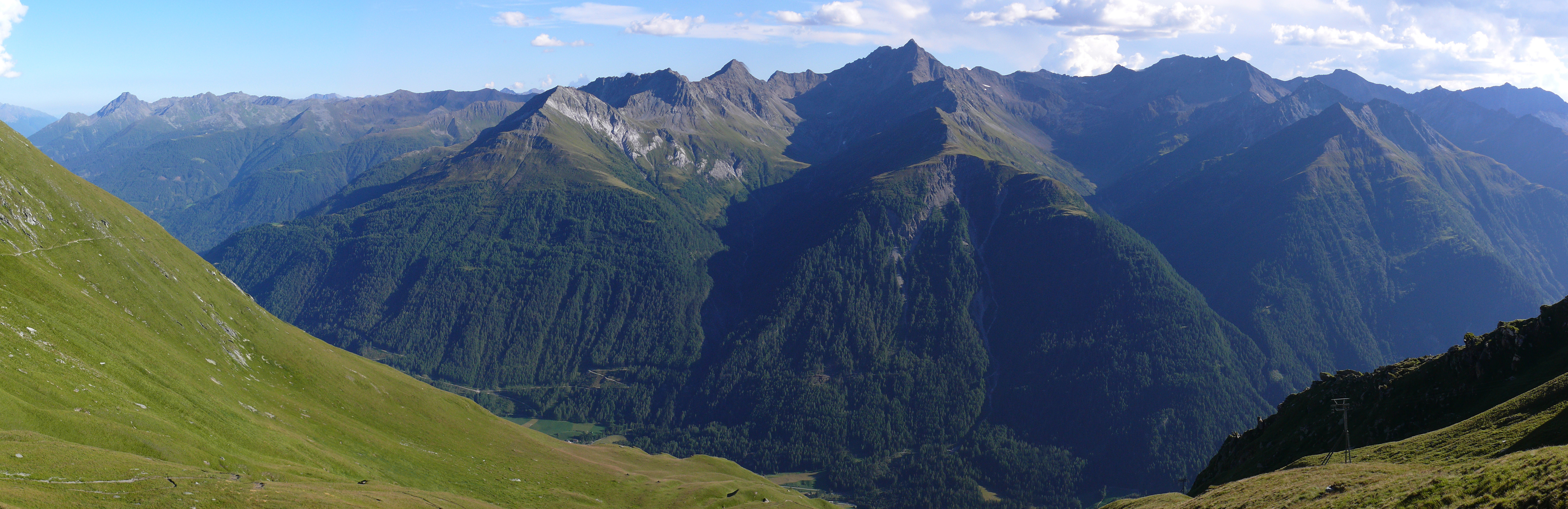
The Lasörling Group seen from the Sajat Hut

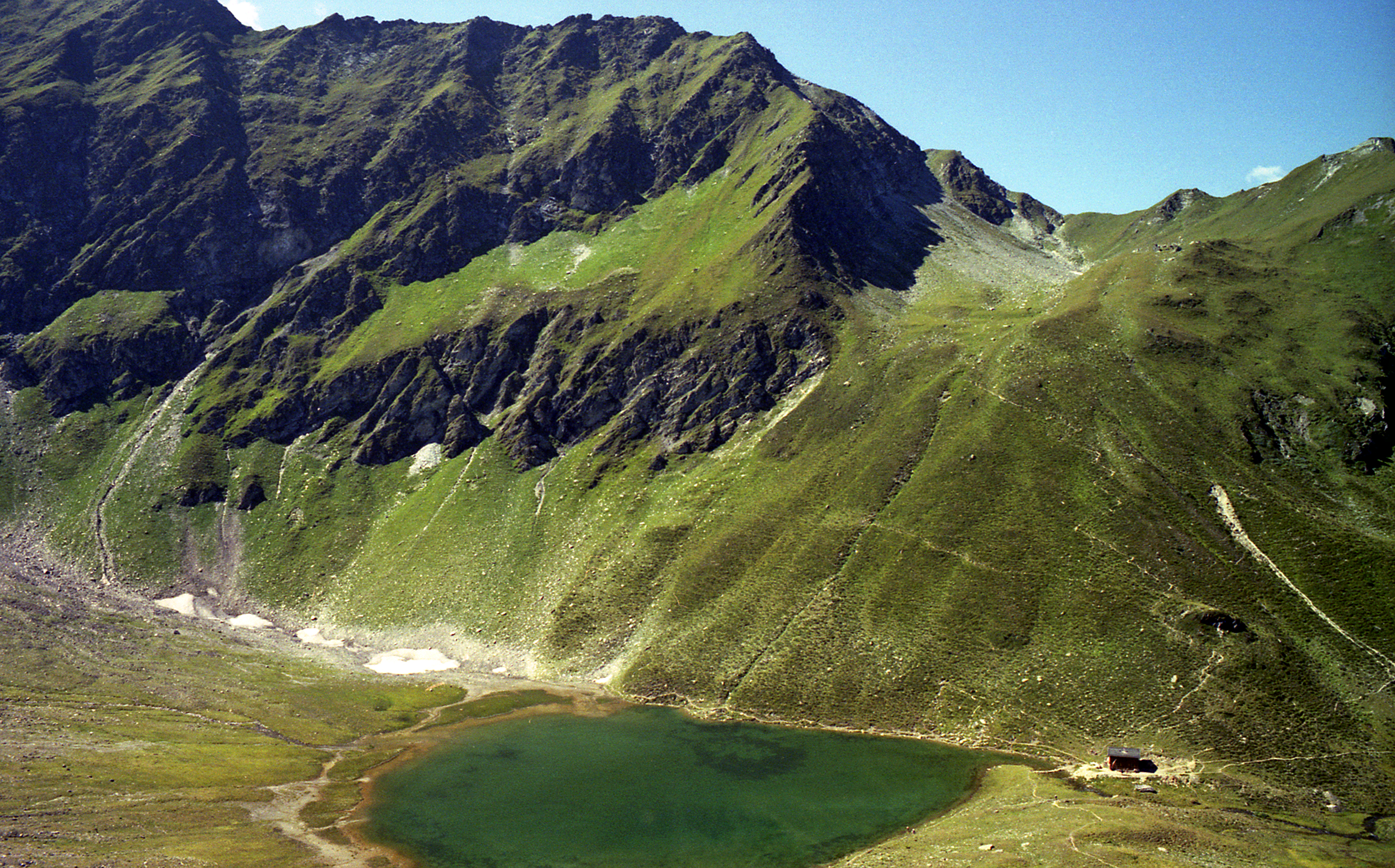
The Bergersee Hut (2,181 m) (below the Goldeckscharte notch), seen from the ascent to the Berger Kogel (1980)
