= Rote Spitze (Villgraten Mountains) =

Mountain in the Villgratner Berge in East Tyrol

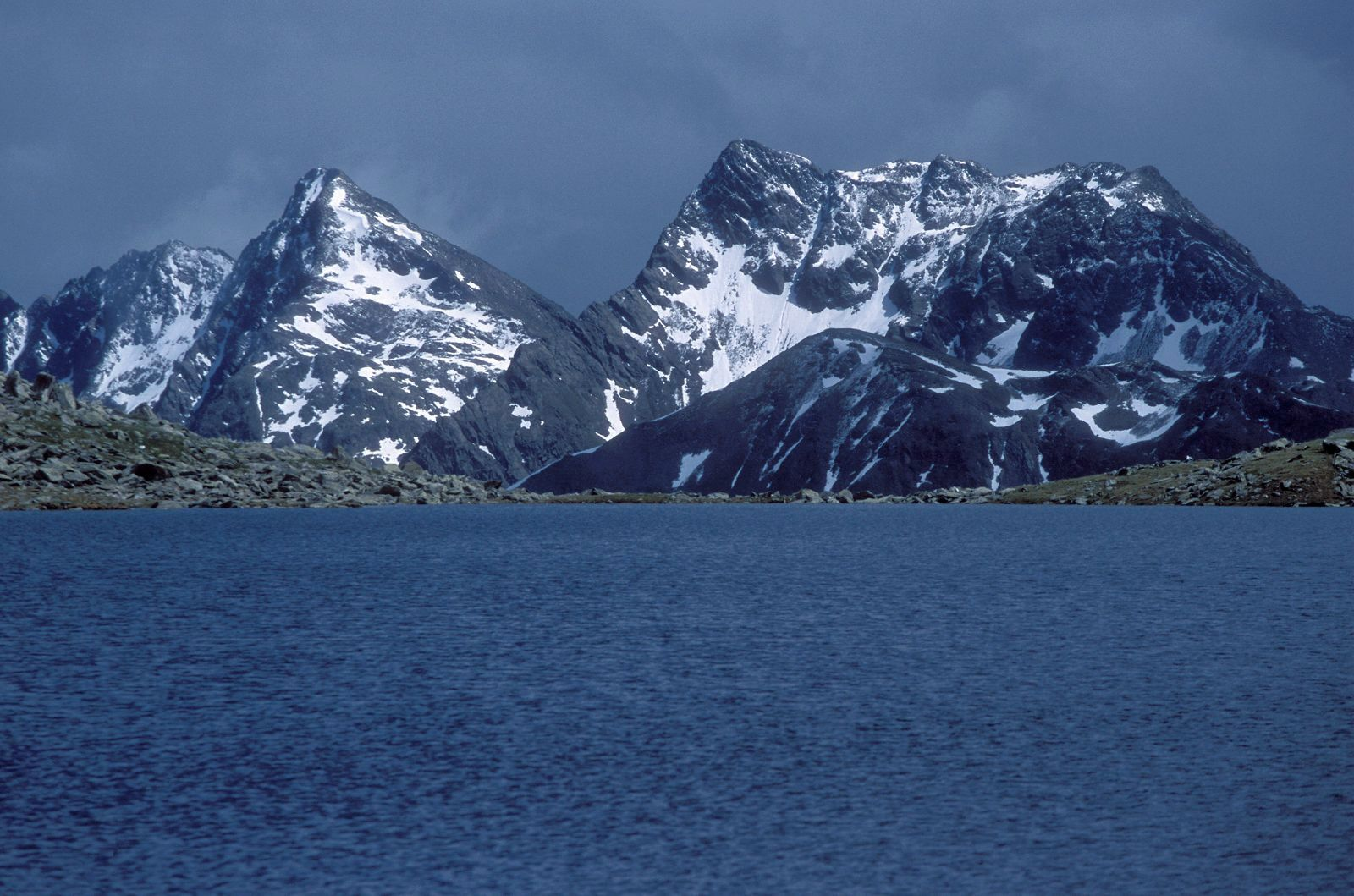
- The two highest summits of the Villgraten Mountains, the Weiße Spitze (2,962 m, left) and Rote Spitze (2,956 m, right) seen from the Oberseitsee to the northwest (2,576 m)

Highest point
- Elevation: 2,956 m (AA) (9,698 ft)
- Prominence: 2,956-2,711 m ↓ Schlötterlenke
- Isolation: 1.1 km → Weiße Spitze
- Coordinates: 46°52′34″N 12°20′39″E

Geography
- Location within Austria
- Location: Tyrol, Austria
- Parent range: Villgraten Mountains

Climbing
- First ascent: 14 January 1896 by J. Erlsbacher

The Rote Spitze is a mountain in Austria and, at 2,956 m (AA), the second highest peak in the Villgraten Mountains. It lies south of St. Jakob in Defereggen and east of the Austro-Italian border.

The immediate neighbour of the Rote Spitze to the east is the somewhat higher Weiße Spitze (2,962 m). The names of the two summits are, however, not absolutely clear. This article adopts the names used by the Federal Office of Metrology and Survey. According to the inhabitants of the Defereggen Valley, however, their names are reversed: they view the Rote Spitze as the higher, eastern summit. (For further details of the naming issue surrounding the Weiße Spitze and Rote Spitze see the Highest summit section of the article on the Villgraten Mountains.)

The Rote Spitze (2,956 m, the westernmost summit of the two aforementioned peaks) may be climbed both from the Defereggen Valley - via Brugger Alm (1,818 m), Ragötzlalm (2,115 m) and Gschrittlenke (2,738 m) -, as well as from the Villgratental valley - via the Oberstalleralm (1,883 m) and Gschrittlenke. The final 150 metres of height below the summit are of climbing grade I+. Individual places are secured here by steel cable. Sure-footedness is essential.

The crossing from the Rote Spitze to the Weiße Spitze is popular with climbers. The route is unmarked (climbing grade III-).
