= Weiße Spitze =

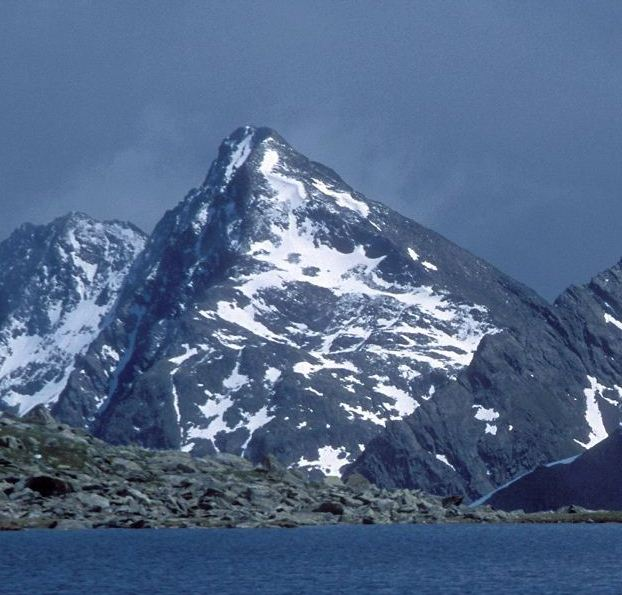
- The Weiße Spitze as seen from the Oberseitsee to the northwest.

Highest point
- Elevation: 2,962 m (AA) (9,718 ft)
- Prominence: 919 m (3,015 ft)
- Isolation: 10.5 km → Seespitze
- Coordinates: 46°52′17″N 12°21′29″E

Geography
- Location within Austria
- Location: Tyrol, Austria
- Parent range: Villgraten Mountains

Climbing
- First ascent: 25 August 1894 by J. Erlsbacher

The Weiße Spitze, at a height of 2,962 m (AA), is the highest peak in the Villgraten Mountains. It lies south of St. Jakob in Defereggen and east of the Austro-Italian border.

The close western neighbour of the Weiße Spitze is the somewhat lower Rote Spitze (2,956 m). The names of the two summits are, however, not absolutely clear. This article adopts the names used by the Federal Office of Metrology and Survey. According to the inhabitants of the Defereggen Valley, however, their names are reversed: they view the Rote Spitze as the higher, eastern summit. (For further details of the naming issue surrounding the Weiße Spitze and Rote Spitze see the Highest summit section of the article on the Villgraten Mountains.)

The Weiße Spitze (2,962 m, the easternmost of the two aforementioned peaks) may be climbed on a signed route only from the upper Villgratental valley (climbing grade II-), a totally separate route from that to the summit of the Rote Spitze.
