= Lasörling =

Mountain of Tyrol

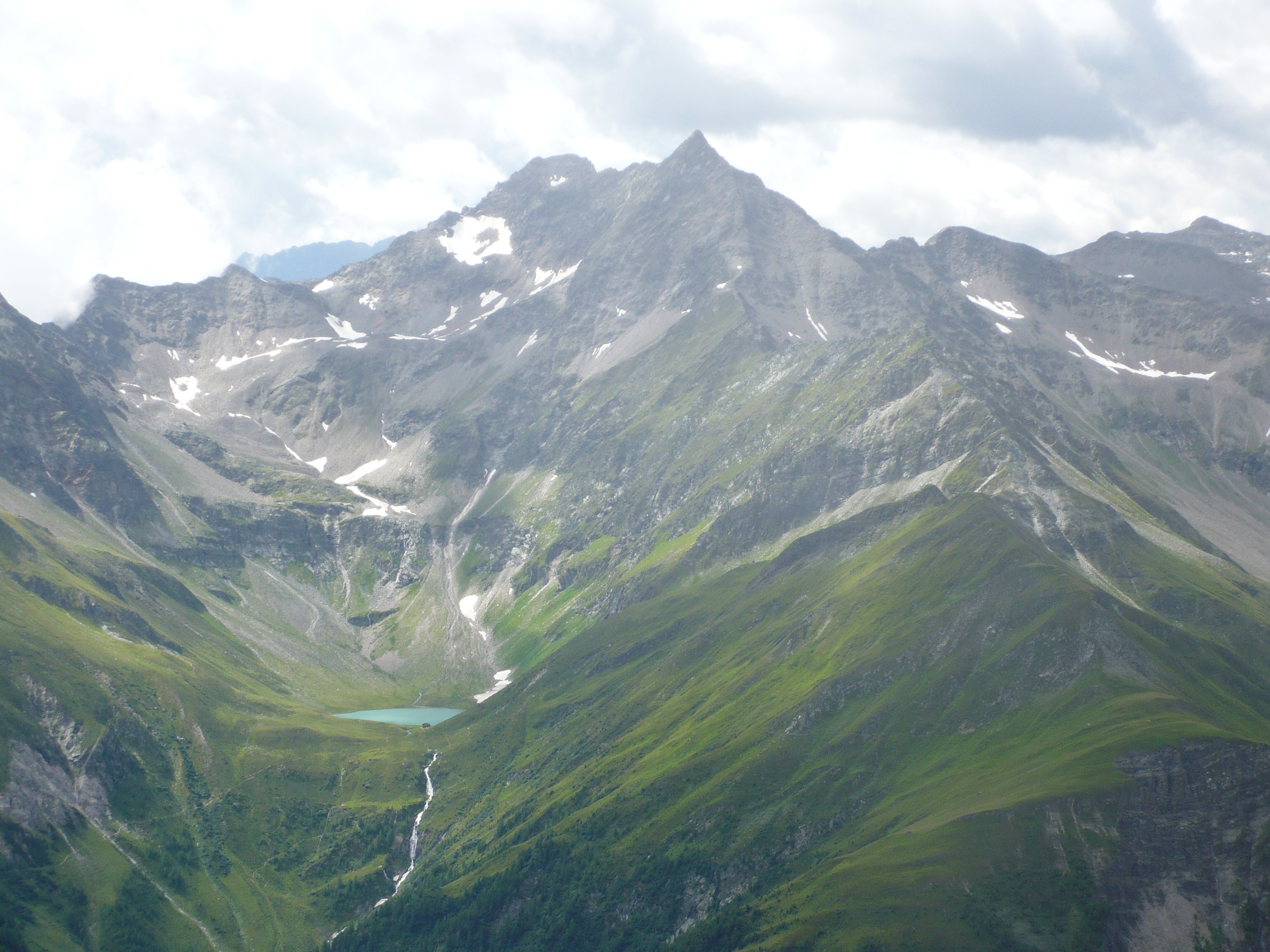
- The Lasörling from the Vorderer Sajatkopf

Highest point
- Elevation: 3,098 m (AA) (10,164 ft)
- Prominence: 490 m ↓ Bachlenke
- Isolation: 7.39 km → Alplesspitze
- Listing: Alpine mountains above 3000 m
- Coordinates: 46°58′00″N 12°21′00″E

Geography
- Location within Austria
- Location: East Tyrol, Austria
- Parent range: Venediger Group

Climbing
- Normal route: Southern ascent from the Glauret (I)

The Lasörling is a mountain, 3,098 m (AA), and the highest summit in the eponymous range that stretches from the Virgental to the Defereggental valleys opposite the Großvenediger. Occasionally the mountain is also called the "Großer Lasörling" ("Great Lasörling) because it has a double summit - its southeast top reaching a height of 3,055 m above sea level (AA). The main top was formerly also called the Bergerspitze, and the southeast top the Musspitze or Virgen Lasörling.

The easiest ascent of the mountain begins in the valley of Virgental and runs through the Mullitztal valley to the Lasörling Hut. This climb is glacier-free, but requires sure-footedness and has climbing sections rated at grade I.

== Name ==
The name "Lasörling" refers to the appearance of the mountain: Arl(ing) is an old German word for ploughshare or plough and stems from the Old Germanic word or loanword from the Slovene word oralnik. Around 1531, the mountain was still recorded with the Slovenian suffix -nik as "Lasornik". For the year 1670 it is written as "Lasernik". The syllable -nik was replaced in later usage by "-ling". The prefix "Las-" goes back to the (Old) Slovenian word for clearance (German: Gereute), as in other words like Lasnitzen, Laßnitz etc.

== First ascent ==
The Lasörling was first climbed via the northern arête in 1861 by Carl von Sonklar after several attempts.

According to other sources the first climbers are unknown, but probably hunters. The first historically confirmed ascent was carried out by H. v. Acken and his survey assistants in 1854 in the course of state survey work using the present normal route, the southern ascent from the Glauret. Carl Sonklar first crossed the east face on the descent (1861) and the northwestern arête (1864).

== Routes to the summit ==
The most popular route up the Lasörling runs initially from the Lasörling Hut (2,350 m above sea level (AA)) heading northwest into the former mining area of Glauret. South of the summit the path branches off north and runs in zig-zags over piles of moraine to the Lasörlingscharte notch (2,950 m above sea level (AA)) and finally to the summit. The 748 metres of height can be climbed in about three hours.

The shortest way from the Virgental valley to the summit runs through the Lasnitzental valley in a southern and later southeasterly direction to the western arête. After a short and easy climb on the ridge in an easterly direction the route arrives at the Lasörlingscharte and joins the path from the Lasörling Hut.

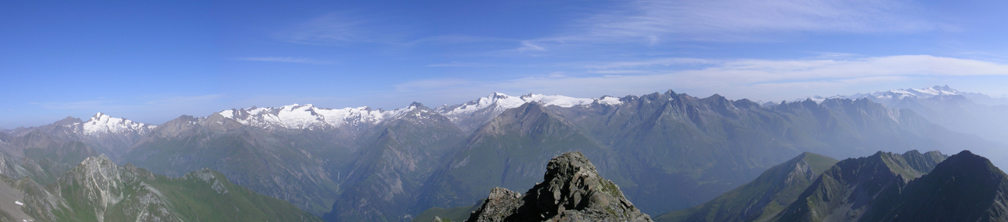
Panorama from the Lasörling of the Venediger Group

== Literature ==
- Richard Goedeke: 3000er in den Nordalpen. Bruckmann, München 2004, ISBN 3-7654-3930-4
- Walter Mair: Osttiroler Wanderbuch. Tyrolia, Innsbruck 2001, 6. Auflage
- Hubert Peterka / Willi End: Alpenvereinsführer Venedigergruppe. Bergverlag Rudolf Rother, Munich, 1982, ISBN 3-7633-1242-0.
