= Villgraten Mountains =

Mountain range in Austria

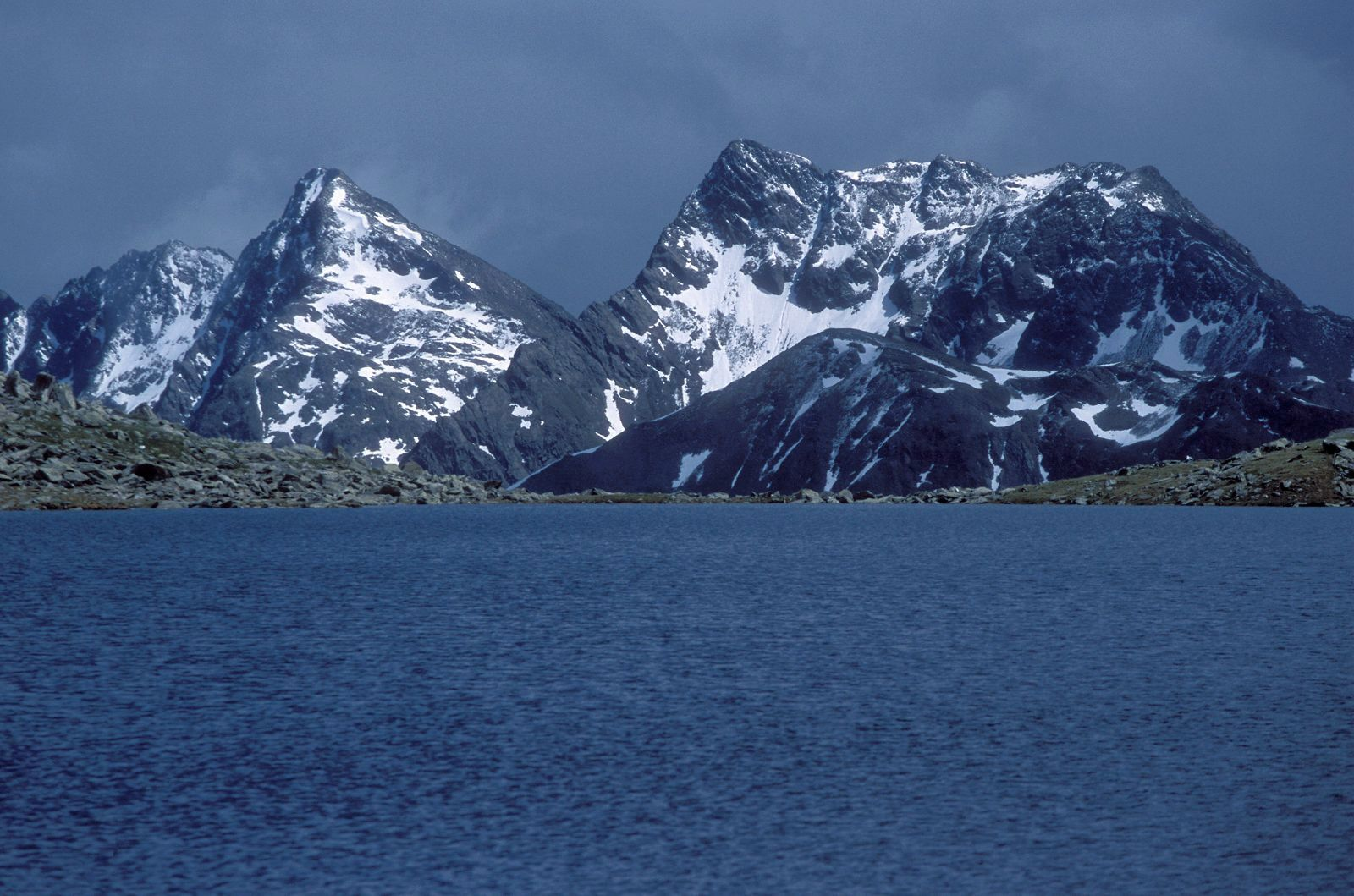
- The two highest summits of the Villgraten Mountains, the Weiße Spitze (2,962 m, left) and Rote Spitze (2,956 m, right) seen from the Oberseitsee to the northwest (2,576 m)

Highest point
- Peak: Weiße Spitze
- Elevation: 2,962 m above sea level (AA)

Dimensions
- Length: 44 km (27 mi)

Geography
- Location within Alps
- State(s): East Tyrol, Trentino-South Tyrol
- Range coordinates: 46°52′18″N 12°21′29″E
- Parent range: High Tauern

The Villgraten Mountains (German: Villgratner Berge) or Deferegg Alps (Deferegger Alpen), also called the Defreggen Mountains (Defreggengebirge, archaically also with "ff") are a subgroup of the Austrian Central Alps within the Eastern Alps of Europe. Together with the Ankogel Group, the Goldberg Group, the Glockner Group, the Schober Group, the Kreuzeck Group, the Granatspitze Group, the Venediger Group and the Rieserferner Group, the Villgraten Mountains are part of the major mountain range, the High Tauern. Their highest summit is the Weiße Spitze with a height of 2,962 m above sea level (AA).

== Location ==
The Villgraten Mountains lie mainly in Austria, in the state of Tyrol, with a smaller element in Italy in the province of South Tyrol, in the region of Trentino-South Tyrol. They are located in the south of the High Tauern. Lienz, the regional capital of East Tyrol, is on the eastern side of the mountain range. Olang in the Puster Valley is located on the western side. Their name comes from the Villgraten Valley (Villgratental), which runs up into the mountains from the south.

The Villgraten Mountains remain largely undeveloped, with minimal access via cable cars and roads. The range is well known for a host of picturesquely situated mountain lakes, its rich plant life and the still relatively intact alpine pastures (Almmähder). The eponymous Villgraten Valley and its neighbour, the Gsies Valley to the west, are a ski touring paradise in winter.

== Name ==
=== Range ===
The range was formally designated as the Villgraten Mountains (Villgratner Berge or Villgrater Berge) in the AVE, the Alpine Club classification of the Eastern Alps in 1984. This term is also used by the publisher, Bergverlag Rudolf Rother, the publishing house with the widest coverage of the Eastern Alps. On many maps, however, they are called the Defereggen Mountains (Defereggengebirge) or Gsies Mountains (Gsieser Berge).

The Defereggen Valley is located on the northern edge of the mountain group. North of the valley is the Venediger Group. The Villgraten Valley, by contrast, is located entirely within the Villgraten Mountains. Consequently, the mountains are undoubtedly more logically named after this valley than after the Defereggental. In older classification systems of the Eastern Alps the Lasörling Group, north of the Defereggental, was counted as part of the Defereggen range. In earlier times the Defereggen Valley would have been a suitable source of the name. Under the AVE, however, the Lasörling Group now belongs clearly to the Venediger Group.

Following the enforced annexation of South Tyrol after the First World War, the western part of the Villgraten Mountains ended up politically as part of Italy and was officially renamed the Monti di Casies. This was not a historically derived regional name, but a translation by Ettore Tolomei. German-speaking South Tyrolese frequently call them the Gsies Mountains (Gsieser Berge).

The term Villgraten Mountains is also historically and formally correct in referring to the entire mountain chain between the Hochstein east of Lienz and the Staller Saddle. Some maps use the name Defereggen Mountains (Defereggengebirge) for the eastern portion that lies within Austria, whilst labelling them the Gsieser Berge/Monti di Casies in the western portion that lies in Italy.

=== Highest summit ===
In the centre of the group rise two summits of almost equal height (46°52′18″N 12°21′29″E and 46°52′34.86″N 12°20′39.96″E), called the Weiße Spitze and Rote Spitze ("White Peak" and "Red Peak"). The more easterly, with a height of 2,962 m above sea level (AA), is the highest point in the group. On that, all the maps and literature are agreed. However, the naming of the two summits is disputed. Whilst the majority of the Alpine literature, the official maps and the inhabitants of the southern Villgraten valleys call the higher, eastern summit the Weiße Spitze, and its lower, western, neighbour the Rote Spitze, it is referred to in the Defreggental, north of the mountains, and in one of the hiking books the other way around, thus naming the highest point as the Rote Spitze.

Because the sources do not agree on the naming of these peaks, the designation used by the Austrian Federal Office of Metrology and Surveying is generally preferred. They confirm that the eastern summit is called the Weiße Spitze with a height of 2,962 m above sea level (AA) as the highest peak in the group.

== Peaks ==
No peak in the Villgraten Mountains reaches the 3000 metre mark, but there are 20 summits higher than 2,800 m above sea level (AA) They are (sorted by height):

- Weiße Spitze, 2,962 m above sea level (AA)
- Rote Spitze, 2,956 m above sea level (AA)
- Hochgrabe] 2,951 m above sea level (AA)
- Großes Degenhorn, 2,946 m above sea level (AA)
- Gölbner, 2,943 m above sea level (AA)
- Gumriaul, 2,918 m above sea level (AA)
- Storfenspitze, 2,895 m above sea level (AA)
- Regenstein, 2,891 m above sea level (AA)
- Hochleitenspitze, 2,877 m above sea level (AA)
- Kleines Degenhorn, 2,849 m above sea level (AA)
- Wagensam Spitz, 2,849 m above sea level (AA)
- Kärlskopf, 2,836 m above sea level (AA)
- Wildegg, 2,830 m above sea level (AA)
- Deferegger Pfannhorn, 2,820 m above sea level (AA)
- Rote Wand, 2,818 m above sea level (AA)
- Rappler, 2,812 m above sea level (AA)
- Großer Leppleskofel, 2,811 m above sea level (AA)
- Bockstein, 2,805 m above sea level (AA)
- Kugelwand, 2,803 m above sea level (AA)
- Großes Arnhorn, 2,800 m above sea level (AA)

== Valleys ==
Four larger valleys runs from the south into Villgraten Mountains: the uninhabited Wilfernertal, that descends to the village of Thal in the municipality of Assling, the likewise unpopulated Kristein, the Villgraten valley with its municipalities of Außervillgraten and Innervillgraten and the Gsieser valley in South Tyrol with its villages of Pichl, St. Magdalena and St. Martin. The Villgraten Mountains are bounded in the north by the Defereggen Valley, in the east by the Iseltal, in the southeast by the Lienzer Talboden, in the south by the Puster Valley and in the west by the Antholz Valley. Their boundary with Rieserferner Group is formed by the Staller Saddle. Of note is the Gsieser Törl within the Villgraten Mountains which acts as the transition from the South Tyrolean Gsies Valley (Gsieser Tal) to the East Tyrolean Defereggen Valley (Defereggental), which after the First World War until the 1970s was used as a smuggler's route between Austria and Italy.

== Neighbouring mountain groups ==
The Villgraten Mountains border on the following other mountain groups of the Alps:

- Venediger Group (with its subgroups the Panargenkamm and Lasörling Group) (to the north)
- Granatspitze Group (to the northeast)
- Schober Group (to the east)
- Gailtal Alps (to the southeast)
- Carnic main crest (to the south)
- Dolomites (to the southwest)
- Rieserferner Group (to the northwest)

== Huts ==
In the Villgraten Mountains there is an Alpine Club hut as well as several private huts and mountain cafes or (Jausenstationen):

- Hochstein Hut (Lienz Section, ÖAV): Height: 2,023 m above sea level (AA), managed from early May to end October and from December to mid-March, 4 beds, 8 mattresses, base: Lienz, journey time from the end of the toll road: 10 minutes
- Gölbnerblick Hut (private): Height: 1,824 m above sea level (AA), managed from early June to end September, 4 beds, base: Anras, journey time from the car park in the Kristeinertal: 20 minutes
- Volkzeiner Hut (private, formerly the Sillianer Hut of the ÖAV's Sillian Section): Height: 1,886 m above sea level (AA), managed from about Pentecost to mid-October, 30 beds, 10 mattresses, base: Außervillgraten, journey time from the car park in the Winkeltal: 5 minutes
- Unterstalleralm (private): Height: 1,664 m above sea level (AA), managed from mid-May to mid-October, only a Jausenstation. Rooms may be rented in the surrounding alpine pasture huts, base: Innervillgraten, by the car park in the Arntal
- Jausenstation Kalkstein (private): Height: 1,641 m above sea level (AA), managed in the summer and winter season, accommodation in the Gasthof Bad Kalkstein or Haus Bethanien of the Calasantine order, base: Kalkstein, by the car park.
- Thurntalerrast (private): Height: 1,978 m above sea level (AA), managed von mid-December to Easter and from mid-June to mid-October, 5 holiday apartments, base: Außervillgraten, accessible by road via the Fraktion Unterwalden
- Bonner hut (private, formerly DAV's Bonn Section): Height: 2,340 m above sea level (AA), managed from end May to end October, 8 beds 7 mattresses, base: Toblach, journey time from Kandellen ca. 2–3 hours
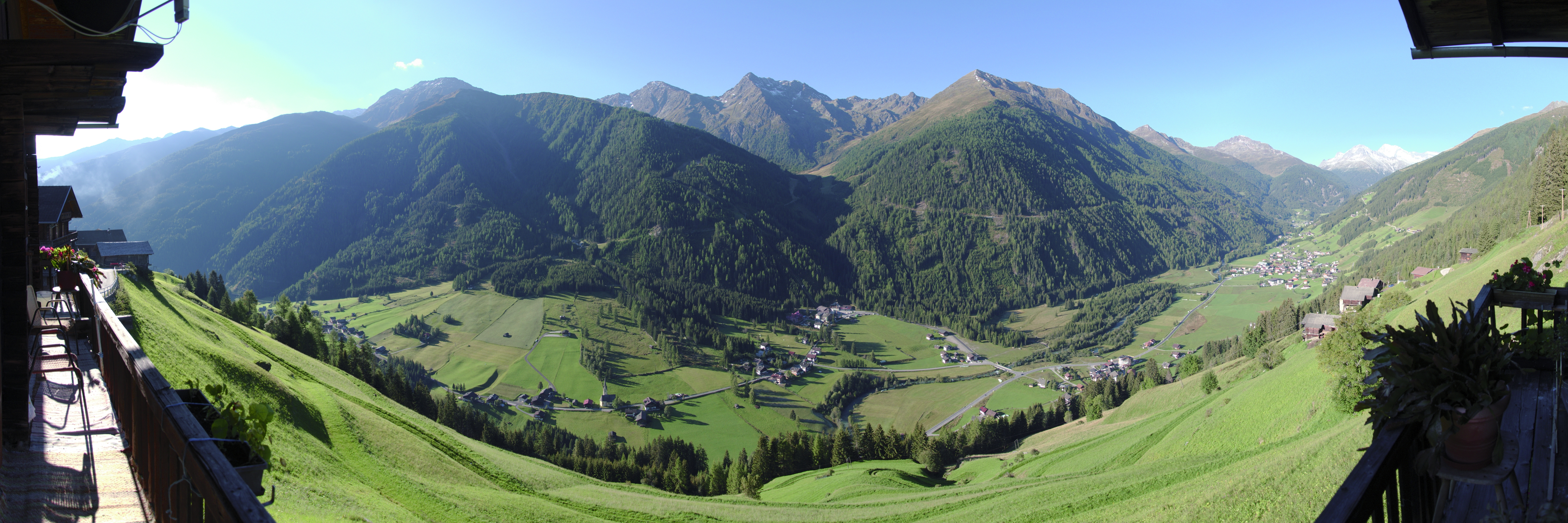
The Villgraten Mountains seen from the Defereggental with the Roter and Weißer Spitze
