= Matrei in Osttirol =

- Municipality
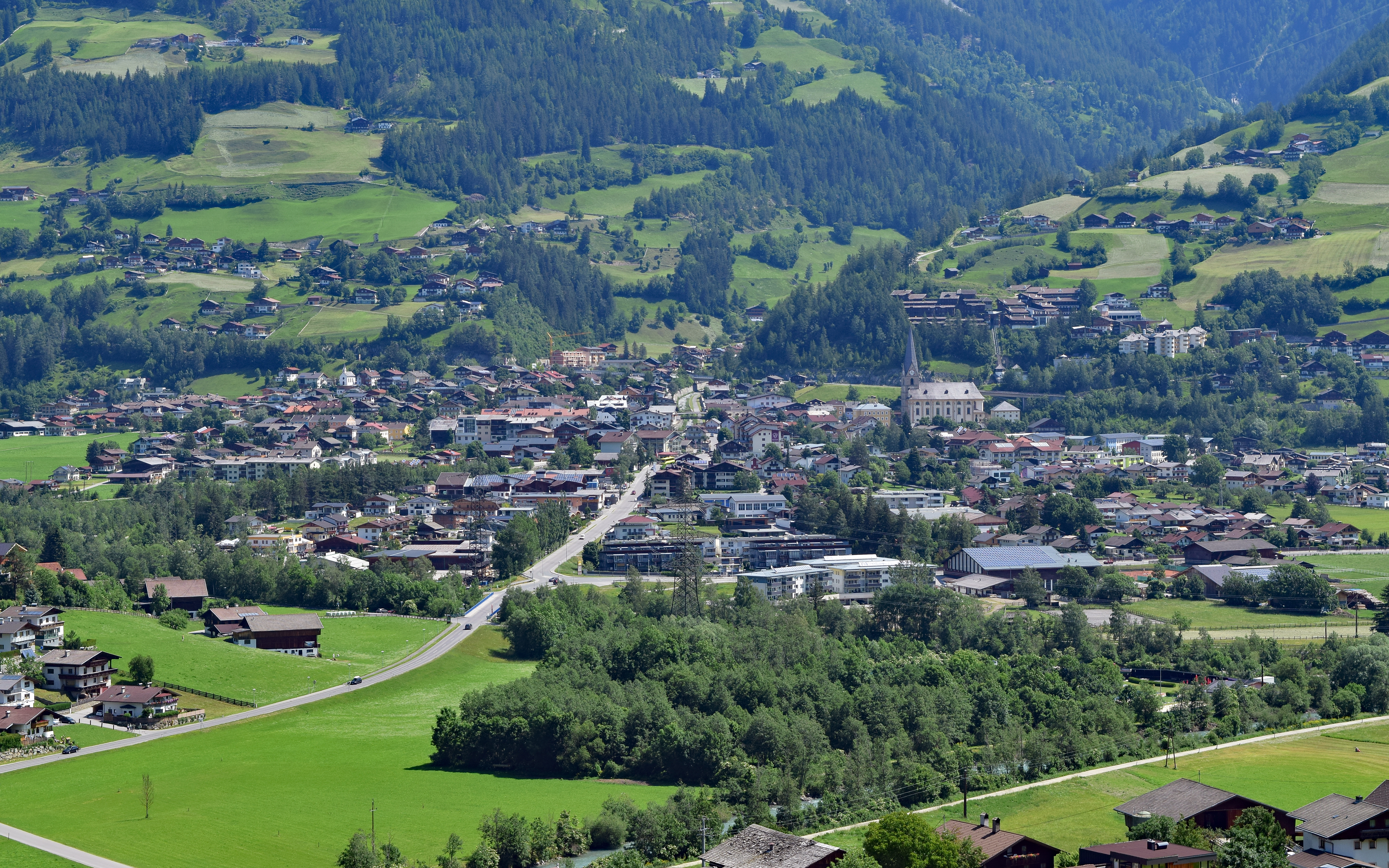

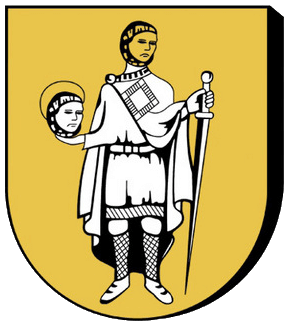
- Coat of arms

- Location within Austria
- Coordinates: 47°00′00″N 12°32′24″E
- Country: Austria
- State: Tyrol
- District: Lienz

Government
  - Mayor: Raimund Steiner

Area
  - Total: 277.77 km^{2} (107.25 sq mi)
- Elevation: 975 m (3,199 ft)

Population (2018-01-01)
  - Total: 4,667
  - Density: 16.80/km^{2} (43.52/sq mi)
- Time zone: UTC+1 (CET)
  - Summer (DST): UTC+2 (CEST)
- Postal code: 9971
- Area code: 04875
- Vehicle registration: LZ
- Website: www.matrei-ost.tirol.gv.at

Matrei in Osttirol is a market town in the Lienz District in the Austrian state of Tyrol (East Tyrol). It is situated about 29 km (18 mi) north of Lienz within the Hohe Tauern mountain range of the Central Eastern Alps. Its municipal area comprises parts of the Granatspitze Group and the Venediger Group, with the Großvenediger peak 3,657 m (11,998 ft) as its highest point. The population largely depends on tourism, seasonal agriculture and forestry.

== Location ==
Neukirchen am Großvenediger	Bramberg / Hollersbach	Mittersill / Uttendorf
Prägraten / Virgen		Kals am Großglockner
Sankt Veit in Defereggen	Hopfgarten in Defereggen	Sankt Johann im Walde

== History ==
The settlement of Matereie was first mentioned in an 1170 deed, its name derived from Indo-European mater ("mother"). It appeared as Windisch Matrei in 1335, in order to distinguish it from North Tyrolean Matrei am Brenner. The denotation Wendish refers to the Slavs. It remained the official name of the municipality until 1921.

In the mid 8th century, the Slavic principality of Carantania had been incorporated by the German stem duchy of Bavaria, which itself became part of the Frankish Carolingian Empire in 788. The East Tyrolean area down to the Drava river was Christianised by missionaries from the Archdiocese of Salzburg in the north, its sphere of influence confirmed by Emperor Charlemagne in 811. Upon the Carolingian fragmentation of the 9th century, it belonged to the Lurngau, a county of the re-established Bavarian duchy within East Francia.

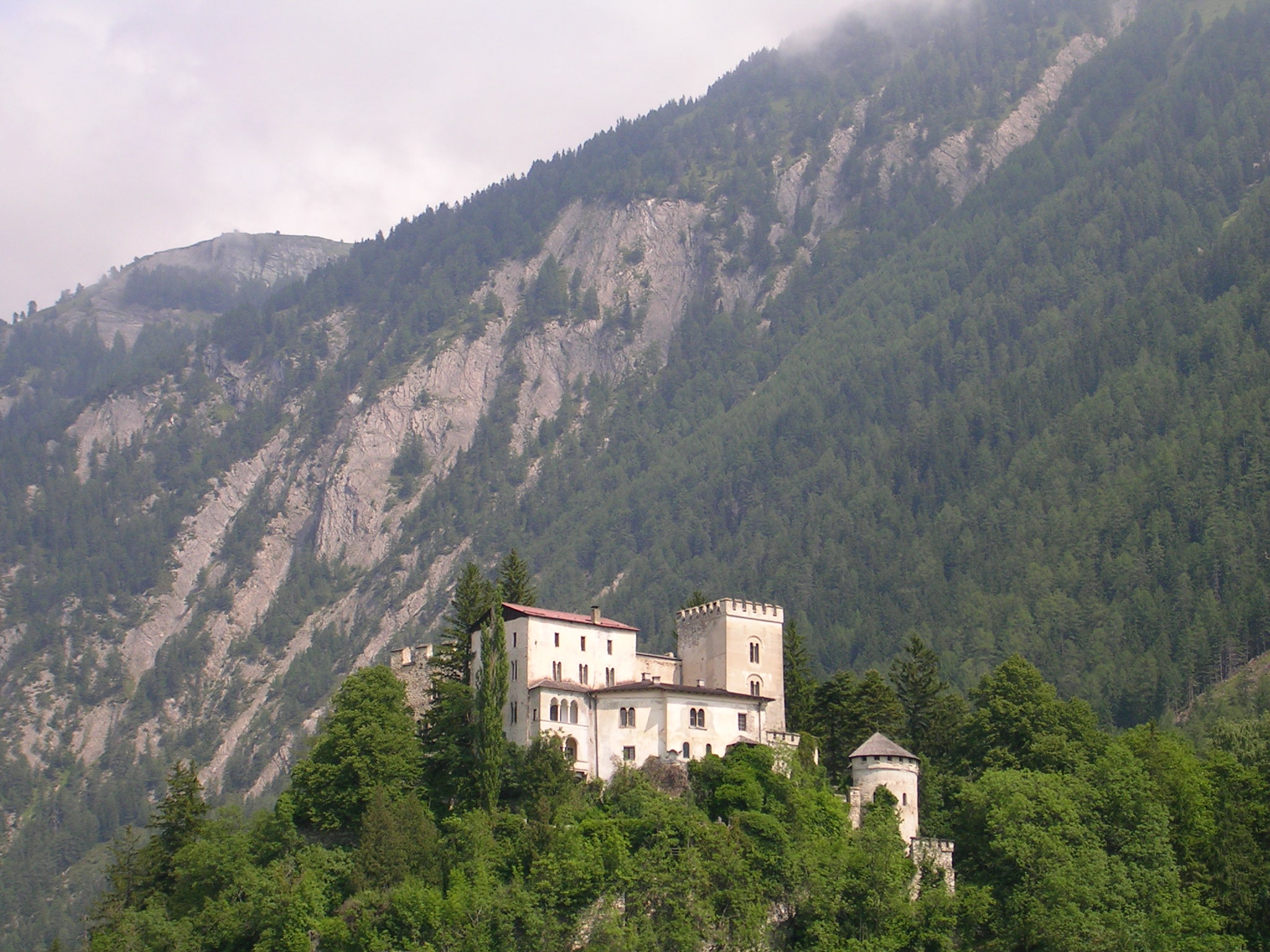
Weißenstein Castle

In 976 the lands became part of the Duchy of Carinthia, though the Archbishops of Salzburg from 1207 onwards held the lordship of Matrei, making it a Salzburg exclave south of the Alpine divide and a thorn in the side of the Counts of Tyrol, who had expanded their estates into the surrounding areas. In 1252 Count Meinhard I of Gorizia-Tyrol occupied the area but finally had to renounce his claims to the Matrei manor in favour of Salzburg. The episcopal administration was provided by a burgrave residing at Weißenstein Castle.

Though Matrei received market rights, it remained isolated from the neighbouring Tyrolean territories and was not easily reachable from the adjacent Salzburg Pinzgau region across the passes of Hohe Tauern range. Trading was poorly developed and the situation of the rural population was miserable, culminating in several revolts against the episcopal rule from the German Peasants' War in 1525 until the 18th century.

In 1801, during the War of the Second Coalition, the last Prince-Archbishop of Salzburg, Count Hieronymus von Colloredo, fled to Vienna. The archbishopric was secularised in 1803, becoming the Electorate of Salzburg, but was incorporated into the Austrian Empire in the 1805 Peace of Pressburg, then ceded to the First French Empire in the 1809 Treaty of Schönbrunn. While the bulk of Salzburg was passed to the Kingdom of Bavaria Matrei became part of the French Illyrian Provinces alongside neighbouring southeastern parts of what had been Tyrol (Note: Tyrol had passed to Bavaria in 1805 and was reorganised into Kreise in 1806. The area around Lienz which passed to the Illyrian Provinces was part of the Eisackkreis) and several other areas ceded by Austria.

Following Napoleon's defeat in 1814 the Illyrian Provinces and Tyrol were returned to Austrian control by the Congress of Vienna. Emperor Francis I of Austria decreed the merger of Matrei into his reconstituted Tyrolean crown land, thereby definitively ending 600 years of isolation. It nevertheless remained a rural area, from the mid 19th century with the sideline source of mountaineering tourism, marked by the first ascent of the Großvenediger peak in 1865. The accessibility was largely improved by the construction of the Felbertauern road tunnel in 1967.

== Population ==
Historical population
Year	Pop.	±%
1869	2,372	—
1880	2,328	−1.9%
1890	2,297	−1.3%
1900	2,297	+0.0%
1910	2,310	+0.6%
1923	2,301	−0.4%
1934	2,610	+13.4%
1939	2,650	+1.5%
1951	3,404	+28.5%
1961	3,430	+0.8%
1971	4,003	+16.7%
1981	4,293	+7.2%
1991	4,521	+5.3%
2001	4,903	+8.4%
2011	4,798	−2.1%
