= Laßnitz =

Laßnitz, Lassnitz or Lasnitz, may refer to:

Places in Austria

- Laßnitz bei Murau (Steirisch Laßnitz), a municipality in Styria
- Laßnitz (Frauental), a cadastral municipality in Frauental an der Laßnitz, Styria
- Laßnitz (Ligist), a settlement in Ligist, Styria
- Laßnitz (Metnitz), a village on the Laßnitzbach stream in the municipality of Metnitz, Carinthia

Historical places

- Tragöß-Oberort, near Bruck an der Mur in Styria, Austria, until the 19th century
- Frauental an der Laßnitz, Styria, Austria, until the mid-20th century
- Laznica (Maribor), village near Maribor, Slovenia
- Laznica (Braničevo), village in the district of Braničevo, Serbia

Rivers in Austria, also called Laßnitzbach, Laßnitz-Bach, Lasnitzen(-bach)

- Rettenbach (Laßnitz), also called the Niedere Laßnitz, West Styria
- Wildbach (Laßnitz), formerly called the Hohe Laßnitz, in West Styria
- Lassnitz (Kainach), in the district of Voitsberg in West Styria
- Lassnitzbach (Mur), in the district of Murau in the Styria and a boundary river of the district of Sankt Veit an der Glan in Carinthia
- Laßnitz (Rabnitz), in East Styria
- Laßnitz (Sulm) (upper course of the Niedere Laßnitz), in West Styria
- Lasnitzen, in the municipality of Prägraten am Großvenediger in the district of Lienz in East Tyrol

See also

- Laznica, Lößnitz, Loznica (disambiguation)
