= Loznica (disambiguation) =

Loznica may refer to:

- Loznica, a city in Serbia
- Loznica (Višegrad), a village in the municipality of Višegrad in Bosnia and Herzegovina
- Loznica (Bratunac), a village in the municipality of Bratunac in Bosnia and Herzegovina
- Loznitsa, a town in Bulgaria
- Loznica, Montenegro
- Łoźnica, West Pomeranian Voivodeship, a village in Poland
- Ložnica, a river in Slovenia
