= Klammljoch =

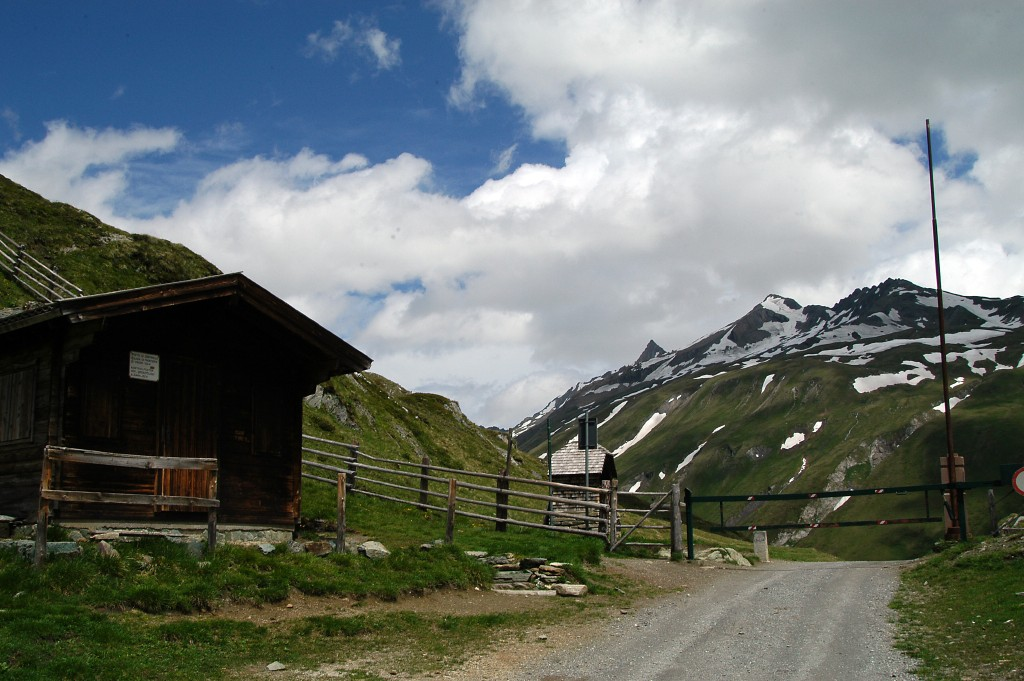
- Border crossing at the pass

- Location within Alps
- Elevation: 2,288 metres (7,507 ft)

Third Approach
- Location: Austria–Italy border
- Range: Alps
- Coordinates: 46°59′N 12°7′E

Klammljoch (el. 2288 m.) is a high mountain pass in the Alps on the border between Austria and Italy.

It connects the Austrian state of Tyrol with the Italian province of South Tyrol, being located between Sankt Jakob in Defereggen and Sand in Taufers. The steep gravel road over the pass is closed to motorized vehicles, but it can be traversed by bicycle.

== See also ==
- List of highest paved roads in Europe
- List of mountain passes
