= Hoher Eichham =

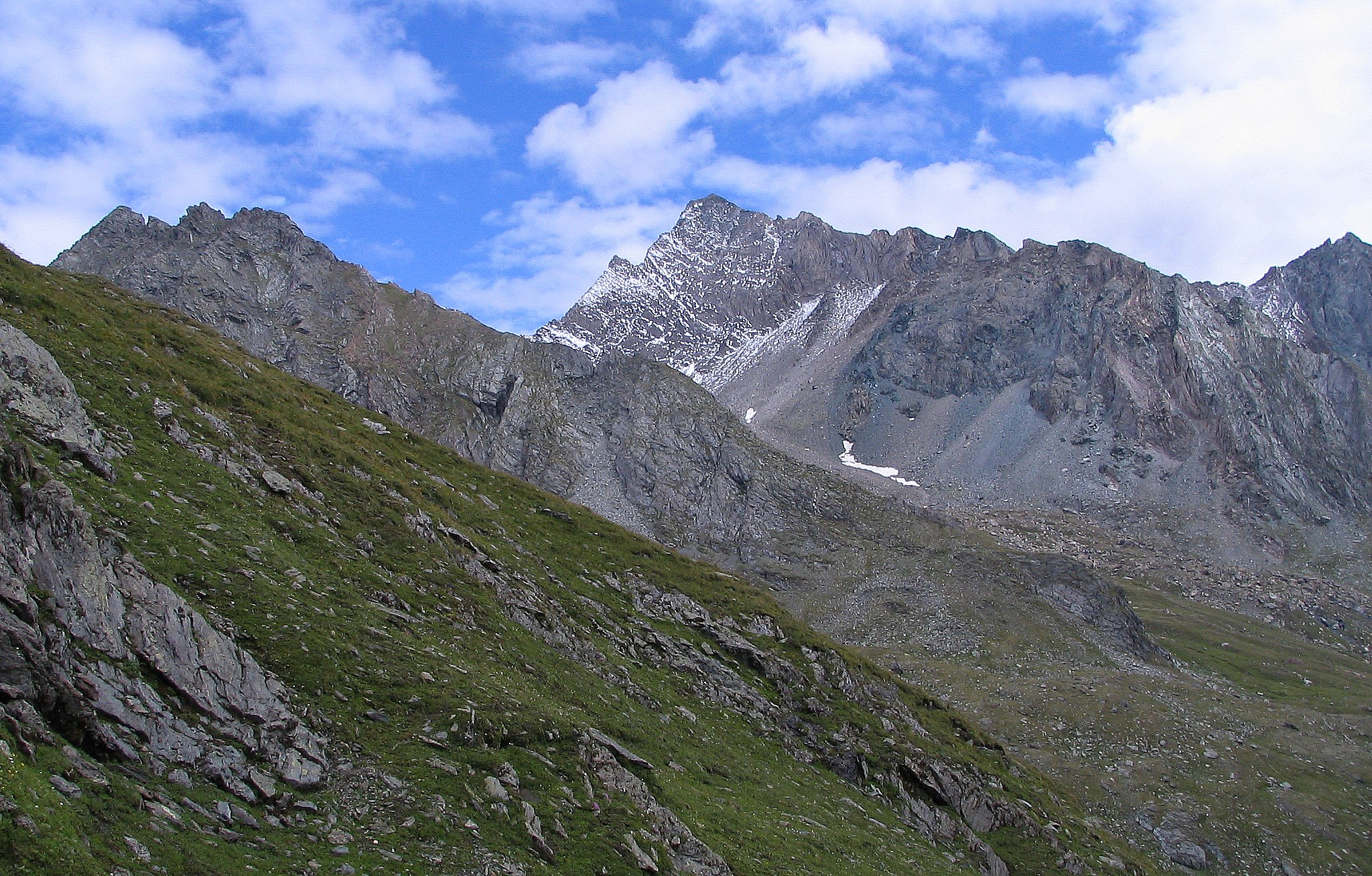
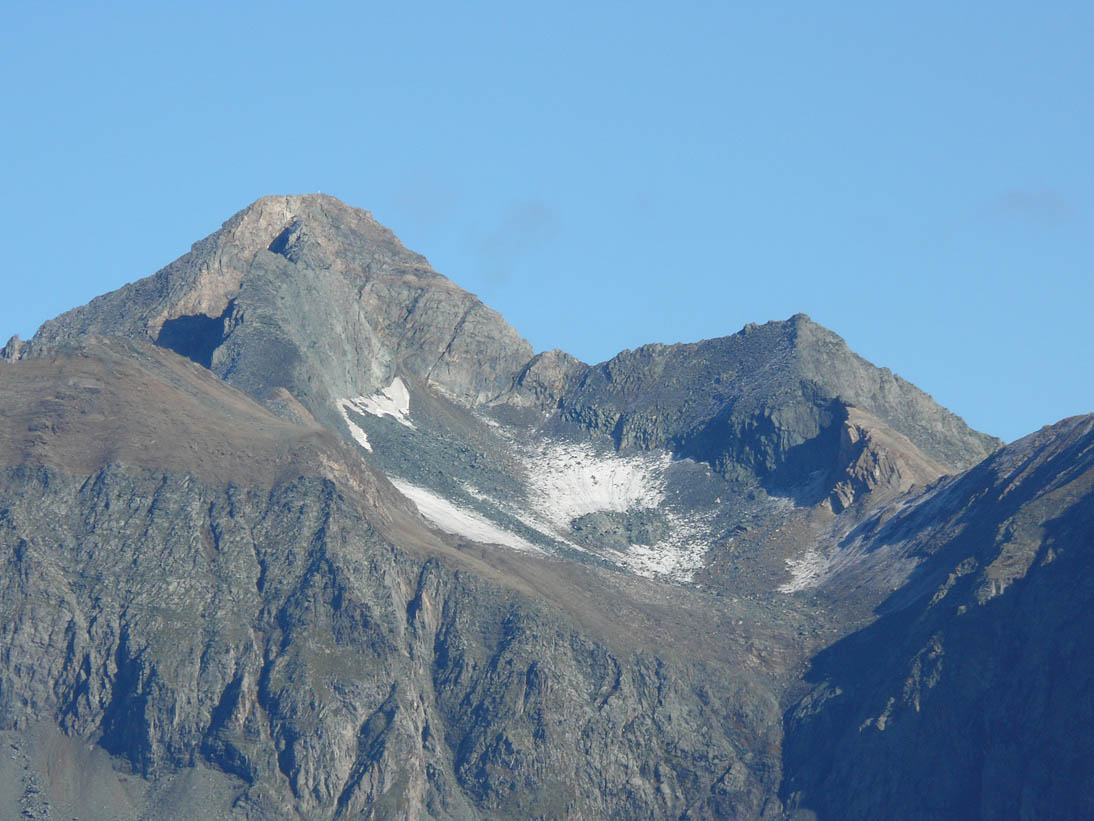
- The Hoher Eicham from the west (Timmeltal) The Hoher Eichham and Nilkees from the south. Right: the Niederer Eichham

Highest point
- Elevation: 3,371 m (AA) (11,060 ft)
- Prominence: 3,371-3,042 m ↓ Seekopfscharte
- Isolation: 5.0 km → Hoher Zaun
- Listing: Alpine mountains above 3000 m
- Coordinates: 47°03′13″N 12°24′23″E

Geography
- Location within Austria
- Location: Tyrol, Austria
- Parent range: Venediger Group

Climbing
- First ascent: 16 July 1887 by Carl Benzien and Hermann Meynow, guided by Hans Hörhager (as tourists)
- Normal route: South Arête (grade UIAA II)

The Hoher Eichham (also Hocheichham), at 3,371 m (AA), is the most dominant mountain in the southeastern part of the Venediger Group in the High Tauern in Austria. Four arêtes radiate from its summit towards the north, east, south and southwest. To the southeast is the glacier of Nilkees and, to the northeast, is the Hexenkees. The Großer Eichhamkees to the northwest and the Kleiner Eichhamkees to the southwest have shrunk to insignificant slabs of ice. On the North Arête is a rock tower, the Eichhamturm (3,255 m above sea level (AA)). Along the continuation of the arête lies the Großer Hexenkopf (3,313 m above sea level (AA)), which is roughly 600 metres as the crow flies from the Hoher Eichham. On the East Arête is the Niederer Eichham ("Lower Eichham", 3,247 m above sea level (AA)). From this subpeak a ridge branches southeast linking it with the Sailkopf; the lowest notch on this arête being the Sailscharte (3,080 m above sea level (AA)). The Hoher Eichham may have first been climbed during a military survey using triangulation in the 1850s. The first visit to the summit by tourists was on 16 July 1887 by Berlin alpinists, Carl Benzien and Hermann Meynow using the South Arête. They were led by the Zillertal mountain guide, Hans Hörhager, from Dornauberg.

== Ascent ==
The mountain is usually ascended from the Bonn-Matreier Hut. Here, the climber initially heads for the Sailkopf using its normal route, then drops about 130 metres of height along its northwest arête to the Sailscharte. Next the Nilkees is crossed, heading westwards to the Eichhamscharte notch(3,125 m above sea level (AA)). Alternatively one can start at the Nilljoch Hut (1,990 m above sea level (AA)) heading straight up the Niltal valley to the Nilkees glacier and the Eichhamscharte. From the Eichhamscharte the route now climbs the southern flank up to about 3,200 metres. The climbing route that now follows involves a short, steep section of rock face and a descent into a notch just before the summit block (grade II). The route is very exposed but may be secured by climbing bolts. From the Bonn-Matreier Hut to the top takes about 3½ hours. In crossing the Nilkees, the risk from crevasses is quite low, however, depending on the conditions, crampons and an ice axe may be useful.

== Literature and maps ==
- Georg Zlöbl: Die Dreitausender Osttirols im Nationalpark Hohe Tauern. Verlag Grafik Zloebl, Lienz-Tristach, 2005, ISBN 3-200-00428-2
- Willi End: Alpine Club Guide Venedigergruppe, Bergverlag Rother, Munich, 2006, ISBN 3-7633-1242-0
- Alpenvereinskarte 1:25.000, Sheet 36, Venedigergruppe, ISBN 3-928777-49-1
