= Frauental an der Laßnitz =

- Municipality
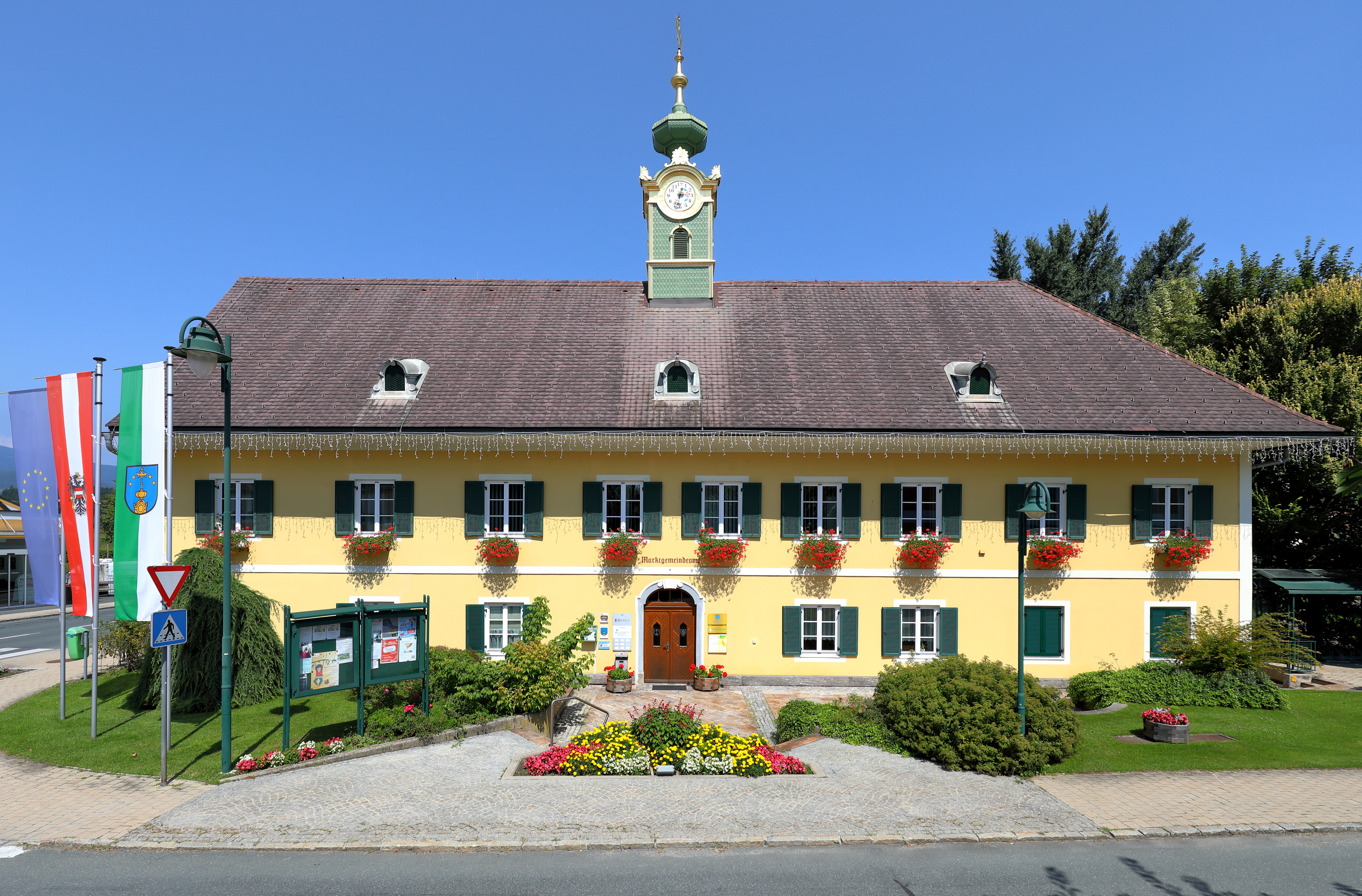
- Frauental town hall

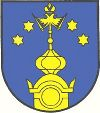
- Coat of arms

- Location within Austria
- Coordinates: 46°49′34″N 15°15′20″E
- Country: Austria
- State: Styria
- District: Deutschlandsberg

Government
  - Mayor: Bernd Hermann (SPÖ)

Area
  - Total: 15.55 km^{2} (6.00 sq mi)
- Elevation: 332 m (1,089 ft)

Population (2018-01-01)
  - Total: 2,894
  - Density: 186.1/km^{2} (482.0/sq mi)
- Time zone: UTC+1 (CET)
  - Summer (DST): UTC+2 (CEST)
- Postal code: 8523
- Area code: 03462
- Vehicle registration: DL
- Website: www.frauental-lassnitz.steiermark.at

Frauental an der Laßnitz is a municipality in the district of Deutschlandsberg in the Austrian state of Styria. On its territory lies the eastern entrance of the Koralmtunnel, a 33 km long railway tunnel currently under construction.

== Population ==
Historical population
Year	Pop.	±%
1869	1,211	—
1880	1,216	+0.4%
1890	1,258	+3.5%
1900	1,428	+13.5%
1910	1,399	−2.0%
1923	1,468	+4.9%
1934	1,816	+23.7%
1939	1,866	+2.8%
1951	2,166	+16.1%
1961	2,489	+14.9%
1971	2,847	+14.4%
1981	2,893	+1.6%
1991	2,949	+1.9%
2001	2,997	+1.6%
2011	2,925	−2.4%
