= Defereggen Valley =

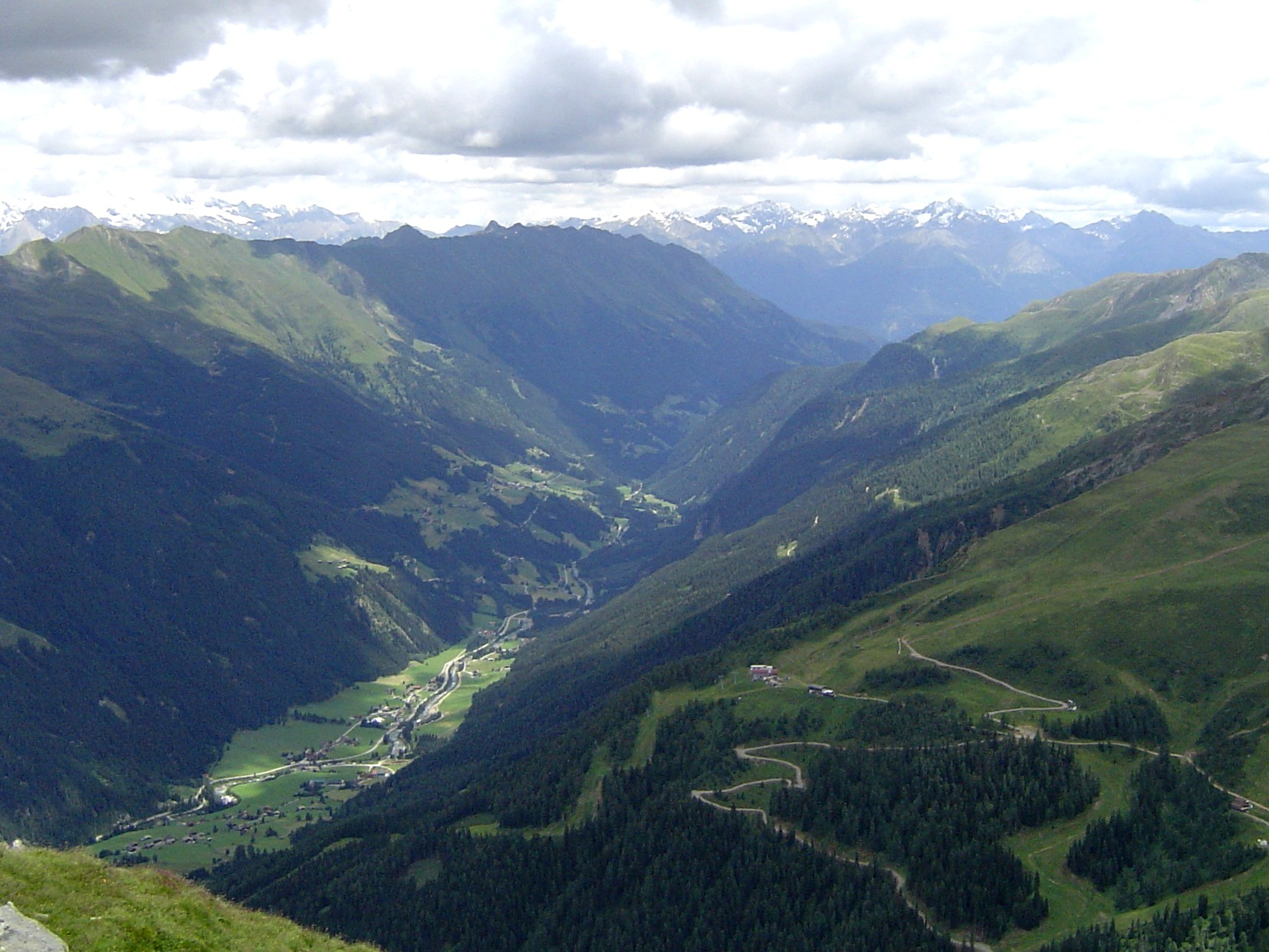
View from the Wetterkreuz in St. Jakob over the Defereggen Valley looking toward Austria’s highest mountain, Großglockner

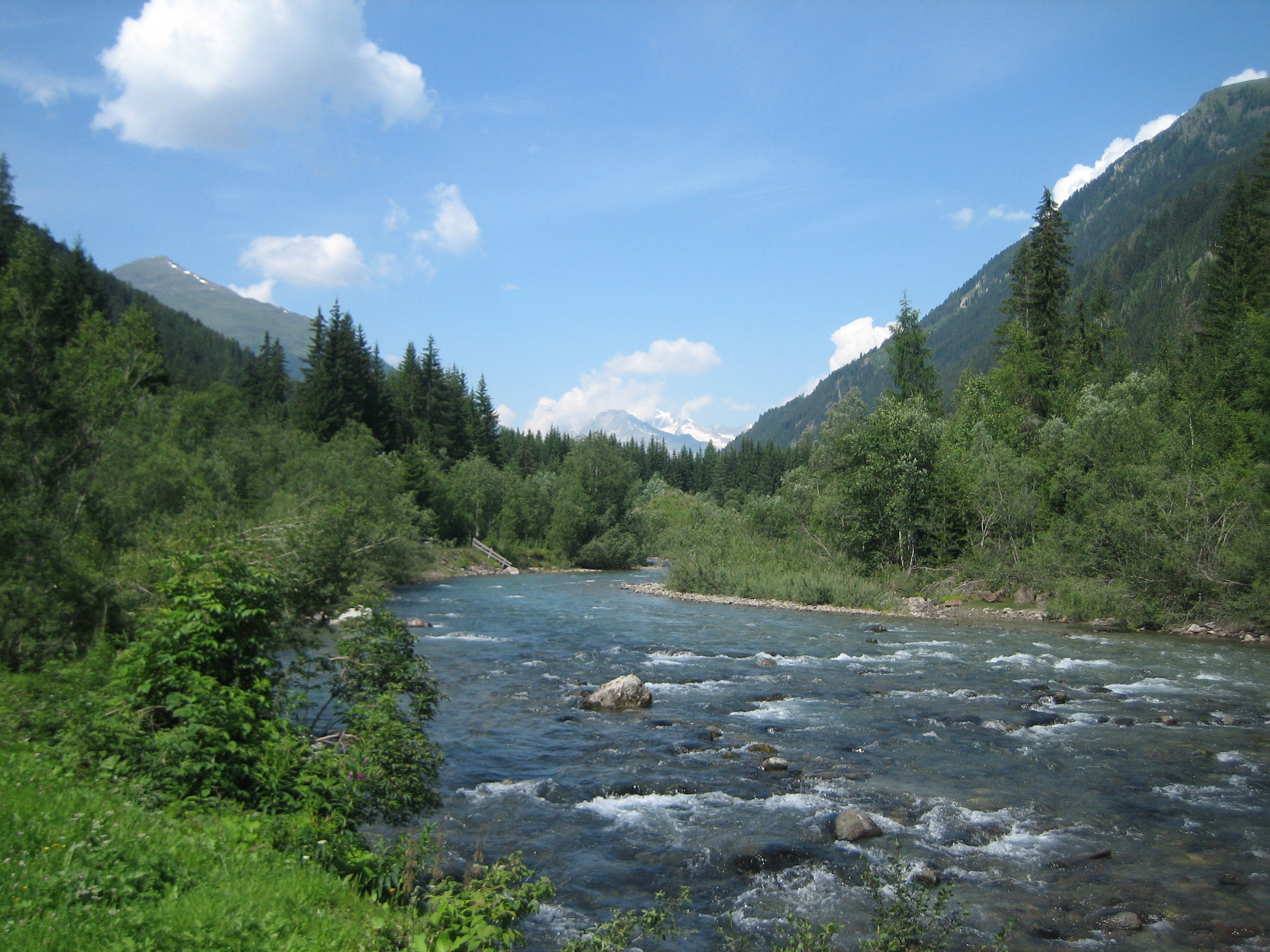
Near St. Veit

The Defereggen Valley (German: Defereggental), or simply Defereggen (German pronunciation: [ˈdɛfəʁɛɡn̩]), is the middle of the three East Tyrolean high mountain valleys running from east to west. Its parallel-running neighbours are the Puster Valley and the Virgen Valley. The Defereggen Valley is linked by a road called the Defereggentalstraße. Its name is derived from the Celtic word dubar (black, dark) or from the Slavic dober (good).

It lies in the High Tauern National Park and is surrounded by the peaks of the Defereggen range, the Rieserferner Group, the Lasörling Group and the Schober Group. The Schwarzach river flows through the valley. There are three municipalities in the valley: Hopfgarten in Defereggen, St. Veit in Defereggen and St. Jakob in Defereggen.

The Defereggen Valley has been settled since the 7th century by settlers who entered it over the Staller Saddle and the Klammljoch, both crossings into the present day South Tyrol. Even today the South Tyrolese have grazing rights in the upper Defereggen Valley. The main village of St. Jakob im Defereggental is the oldest settlement in East Tyrol. On the other side of the Staller Saddle is the Antholz valley.

In the 17th century about half the population of the Defereggen Valley left the Roman Catholic church and became Protestants. After they refused the Archbishop of Salzburg’s direction to return, in 1684 they were forced to leave the valley. They had to leave their children behind and to sell their property. These emigrants settled mainly in the area of the present-day German states of Bavaria and Baden-Württemberg.

The Defereggen Valley is protected within the Hohe Tauern National Park, and counts as one of the most unspoiled mountain valleys of the Alps. It is c. 60km long, and thus one of the longest as well as least populated valleys of the Austrian Alps.

== Panorama ==
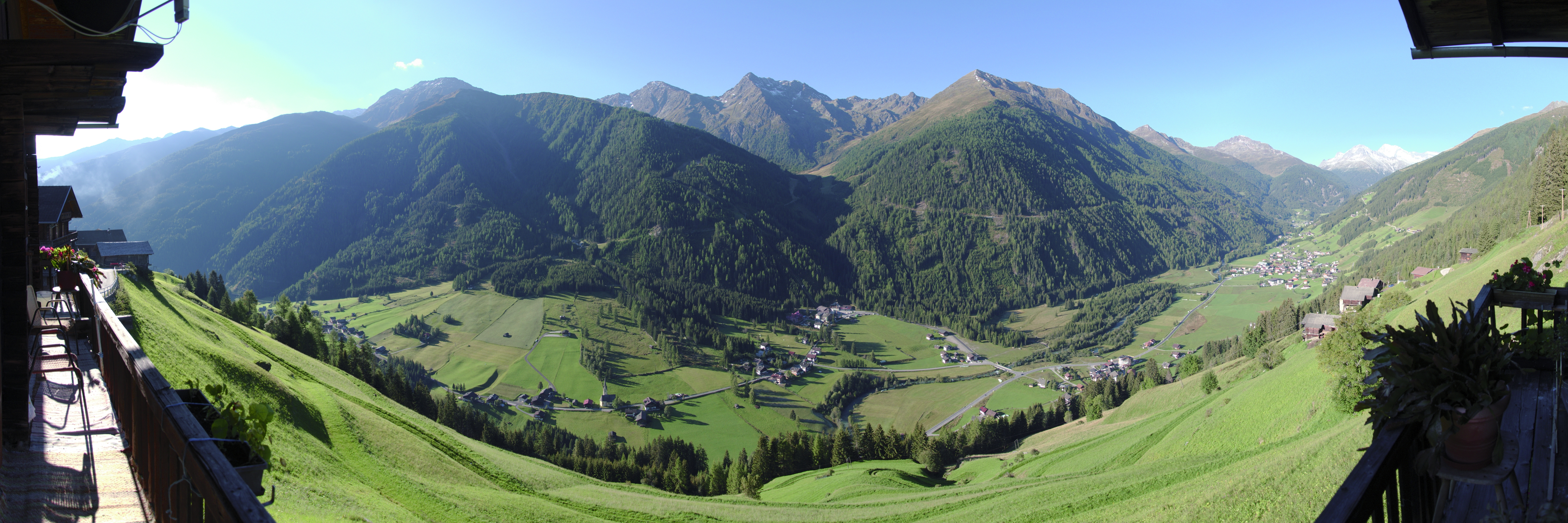
The Defereggen Valley with a view of the Villgraten Mountains and, right, St. Jakob in Defereggen
