= Sankt Veit in Defereggen =

St. Veit in Defereggen
- Municipality
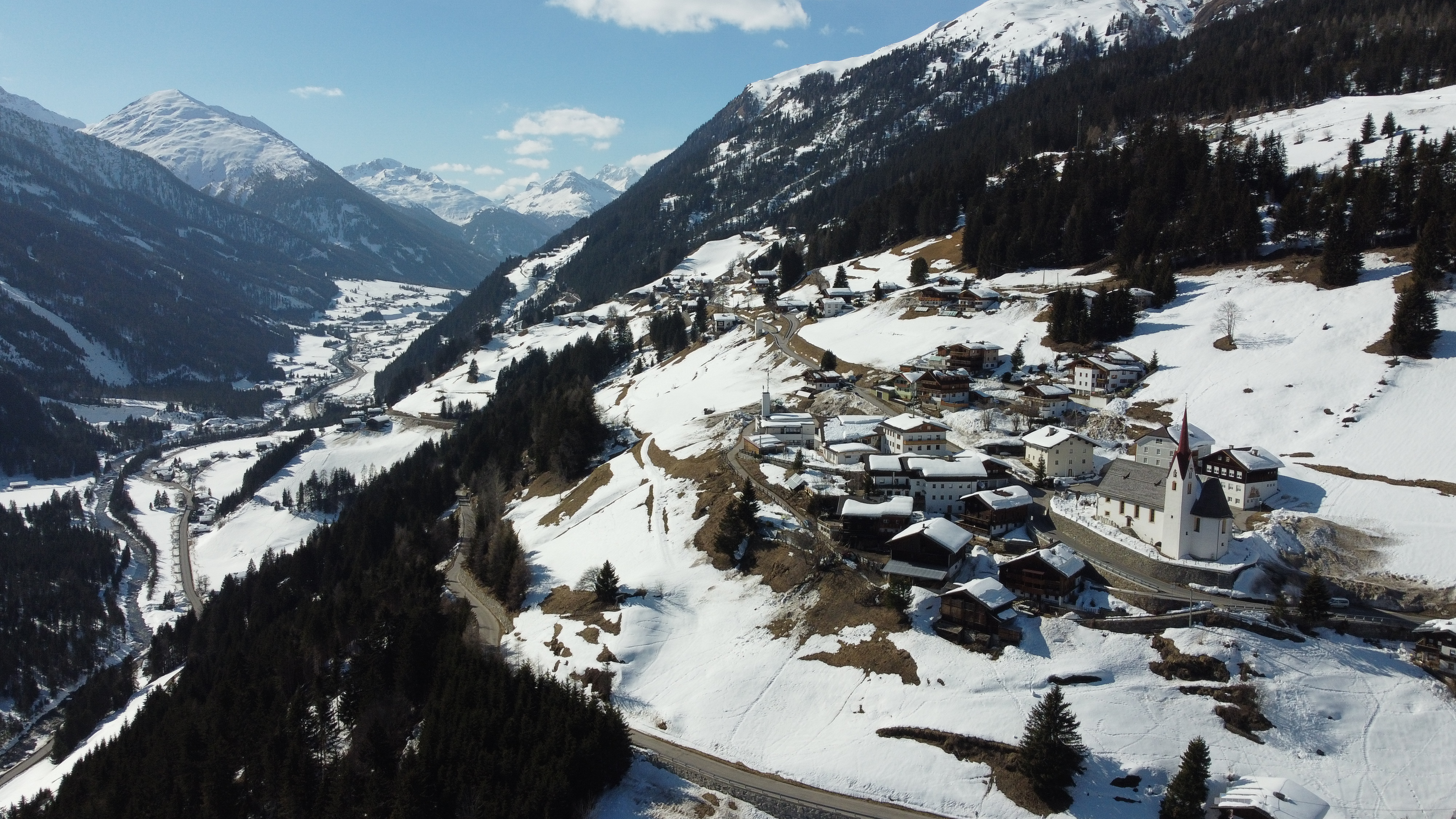
- St. Veit with Defereggen Valley in the background

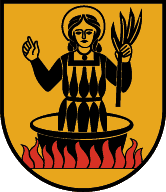
- Coat of arms

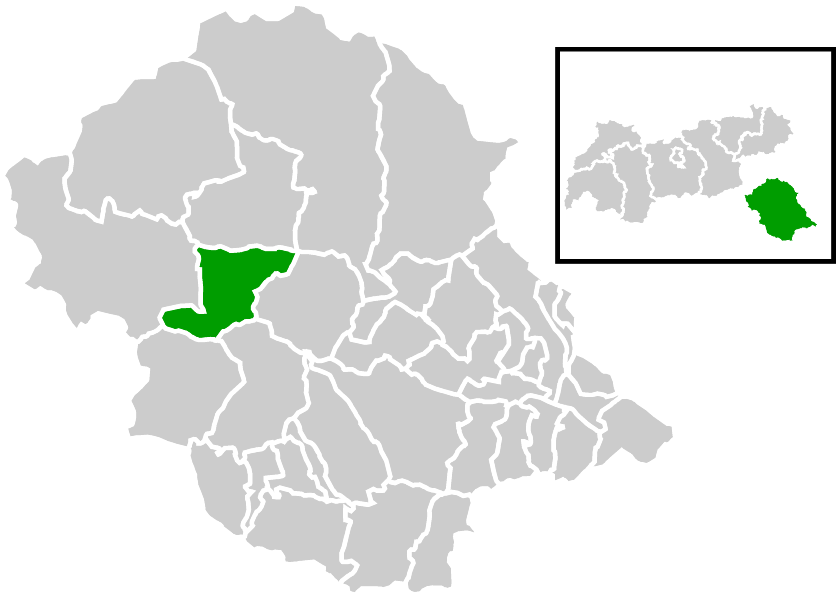
- Location within Lienz district

- Location within Austria
- Coordinates: 46°55′32″N 12°25′33″E
- Country: Austria
- State: Tyrol
- District: Lienz

Government
  - Mayor: Vitus Monitzer

Area
  - Total: 61.49 km^{2} (23.74 sq mi)
- Elevation: 1,495 m (4,905 ft)

Population (2021)
  - Total: 636
  - Density: 10.3/km^{2} (26.8/sq mi)
- Time zone: UTC+1 (CET)
  - Summer (DST): UTC+2 (CEST)
- Postal code: 9962
- Area code: 04879
- Vehicle registration: LZ
- Website: Homepage of the municipality

Sankt Veit in Defereggen ("Saint Vitus in the Defereggen Valley"; Southern Bavarian: St. Veit in Dejfreggin) is a municipality in the district of Lienz in the Austrian state of Tyrol.

== Geography ==
Sankt Veit lies in the central Defereggen Valley and is the municipality in Eastern Tyrol with the highest elevation. It lies on the sunny side of the valley, and in the past grain and potatoes were raised there. However, there can be snowfall even in the summer months.
