= Federal Office of Metrology and Surveying =

The Federal Office of Metrology and Surveying of Austria (German: Bundesamt für Eich- und Vermessungswesen, BEV) is the body responsible for official surveying, geo-information and weights and measures (metrology) in Austria. It belongs to the Bundesministerium für Wirtschaftsstandort und Digitalisierung (Federal Ministry of the Economy Location and Digitization). Its headquarters is in Vienna and it has 67 branches spread across all the Austrian federal states.

== List of Surveying offices (in German) ==
- Amstetten
- Baden
- Bludenz
- Braunau am Inn
- Bregenz
- Bruck an der Mur
- Eisenstadt
- Feldbach
- Freistadt
- Gänserndorf
- Gmünd
- Gmunden
- Graz
- Imst
- Innsbruck
- Judenburg
- Klagenfurt
- Korneuburg
- Krems an der Donau
- Kufstein
- Leibnitz
- Lienz
- Neusiedl am See
- Oberwart
- Ried im Innkreis
- Rohrbach
- Salzburg
- Spittal an der Drau
- St. Johann im Pongau
- St. Pölten
- Steyr
- Villach
- Vöcklabruck
- Vöklermarkt
- Weiz
- Wels
- Wien
- Wiener Neustadt
- Zell am See

== List of Calibration offices (in German) ==
- Wien
- Krems
- Eisenstadt
- Graz
- Klagenfurt
- Linz
- Salzburg
- Innsbruck
- Bregenz

== See also ==
- (List of) national mapping agencies
