= Hopfgarten in Defereggen =

- Municipality
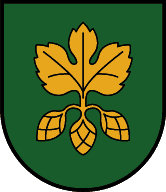
- Coat of arms

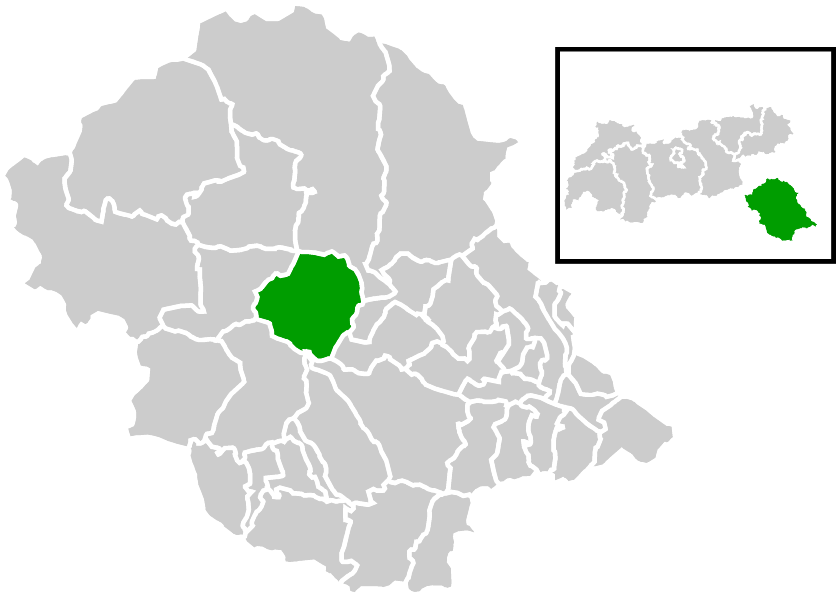
- Location within Lienz district

- Location within Austria
- Coordinates: 46°55′16″N 12°31′09″E
- Country: Austria
- State: Tyrol
- District: Lienz

Government
  - Mayor: Markus Tönig

Area
  - Total: 73.17 km^{2} (28.25 sq mi)
- Elevation: 1,107 m (3,632 ft)

Population (2021)
  - Total: 686
  - Density: 9.38/km^{2} (24.3/sq mi)
- Time zone: UTC+1 (CET)
  - Summer (DST): UTC+2 (CEST)
- Postal code: 9961
- Area code: 04872
- Vehicle registration: LZ

Hopfgarten in Defereggen is a municipality in the district of Lienz in the Austrian state of Tyrol.

== Population ==
Historical population
Year	Pop.	±%
1869	840	—
1880	801	−4.6%
1890	709	−11.5%
1900	734	+3.5%
1910	714	−2.7%
1923	653	−8.5%
1934	707	+8.3%
1939	729	+3.1%
1951	816	+11.9%
1961	889	+8.9%
1971	1,011	+13.7%
1981	1,005	−0.6%
1991	890	−11.4%
2001	839	−5.7%
2011	765	−8.8%
