= Sankt Jakob in Defereggen =

St. Jakob in Defereggen St. Jakoub in Dejfreggin
- Municipality
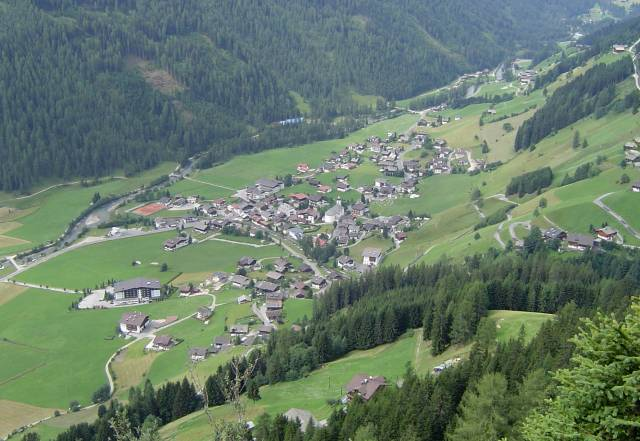
- St Jakob in Defereggen

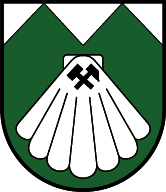
- Coat of arms

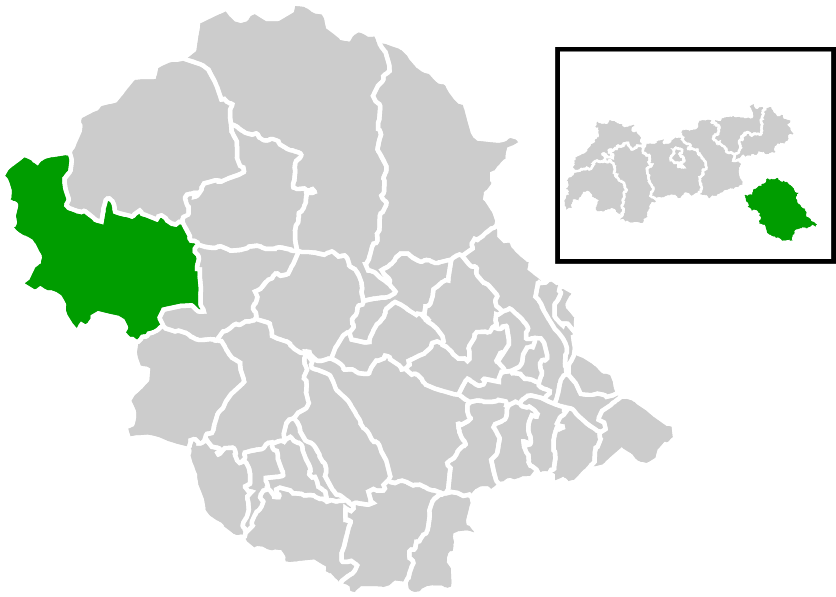
- Location within Lienz district

- Location within Austria
- Coordinates: 46°55′00″N 12°19′00″E
- Country: Austria
- State: Tyrol
- District: Lienz

Government
  - Mayor: Ingo Hafele

Area
  - Total: 186.1 km^{2} (71.9 sq mi)
- Elevation: 1,389 m (4,557 ft)

Population (2021)
  - Total: 829
  - Density: 4.45/km^{2} (11.5/sq mi)
- Time zone: UTC+1 (CET)
  - Summer (DST): UTC+2 (CEST)
- Postal code: 9963
- Area code: 04873
- Vehicle registration: LZ
- Website: www.stjakob.at

Sankt Jakob in Defereggen (Southern Bavarian: St. Jakoub in Dejfreggin) is a municipality in the district of Lienz in the Austrian state of Tyrol.

== Population ==
Historical population
Year	Pop.	±%
1869	1,063	—
1880	1,042	−2.0%
1890	946	−9.2%
1900	976	+3.2%
1910	804	−17.6%
1923	765	−4.9%
1934	821	+7.3%
1939	840	+2.3%
1951	914	+8.8%
1961	889	−2.7%
1971	1,020	+14.7%
1981	1,026	+0.6%
1991	1,005	−2.0%
2001	1,009	+0.4%

== Climate ==
Climate data for Sankt Jakob in Defereggen: 1383m (1991−2020 normals)
Month	Jan	Feb	Mar	Apr	May	Jun	Jul	Aug	Sep	Oct	Nov	Dec	Year
Record high °C (°F)	13.7 (56.7)	14.3 (57.7)	17.9 (64.2)	22.0 (71.6)	26.6 (79.9)	31.8 (89.2)	30.5 (86.9)	30.7 (87.3)	27.0 (80.6)	21.4 (70.5)	19.6 (67.3)	14.3 (57.7)	31.8 (89.2)
Mean daily maximum °C (°F)	−1.4 (29.5)	2.3 (36.1)	6.6 (43.9)	10.8 (51.4)	14.7 (58.5)	19.2 (66.6)	20.3 (68.5)	19.6 (67.3)	15.7 (60.3)	10.4 (50.7)	4.1 (39.4)	−1.5 (29.3)	10.1 (50.1)
Daily mean °C (°F)	−6.5 (20.3)	−4.0 (24.8)	0.7 (33.3)	4.8 (40.6)	9.0 (48.2)	12.5 (54.5)	14.3 (57.7)	14.0 (57.2)	9.9 (49.8)	5.5 (41.9)	−0.2 (31.6)	−5.7 (21.7)	4.5 (40.1)
Mean daily minimum °C (°F)	−11.5 (11.3)	−11.2 (11.8)	−5.4 (22.3)	−1.6 (29.1)	2.4 (36.3)	5.8 (42.4)	7.3 (45.1)	7.2 (45.0)	3.8 (38.8)	−0.1 (31.8)	−4.8 (23.4)	−10.0 (14.0)	−1.5 (29.3)
Record low °C (°F)	−25.1 (−13.2)	−25.0 (−13.0)	−25.6 (−14.1)	−14.5 (5.9)	−6.8 (19.8)	−2.8 (27.0)	−1.3 (29.7)	−2.0 (28.4)	−6.3 (20.7)	−14.4 (6.1)	−19.4 (−2.9)	−27.1 (−16.8)	−27.1 (−16.8)
Average precipitation mm (inches)	33.7 (1.33)	27.5 (1.08)	41.7 (1.64)	56.3 (2.22)	94.0 (3.70)	133.4 (5.25)	149.2 (5.87)	149.1 (5.87)	94.7 (3.73)	91.0 (3.58)	82.6 (3.25)	51.4 (2.02)	1,004.6 (39.54)
Average snowfall cm (inches)	46.1 (18.1)	45.0 (17.7)	47.1 (18.5)	26.0 (10.2)	3.2 (1.3)	0.0 (0.0)	0.0 (0.0)	0.0 (0.0)	2.0 (0.8)	13.1 (5.2)	46.1 (18.1)	61.9 (24.4)	290.5 (114.3)
Source: Central Institute for Meteorology and Geodynamics

== Personalities ==
- Mario Scheiber, skier
