= Weissensee, Austria =

Weissensee Weißensee
- Municipality
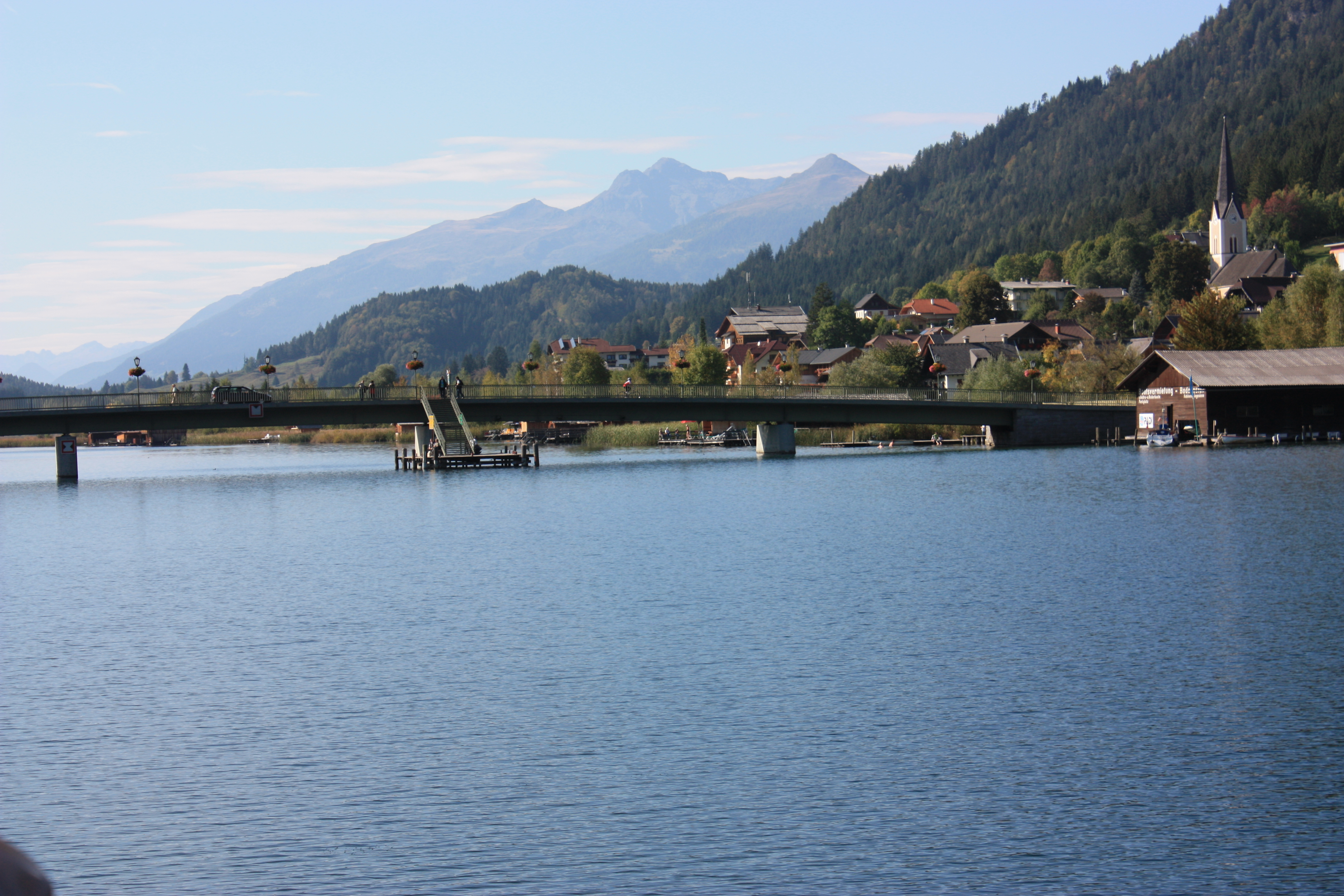
- Techendorf and Weissensee Bridge

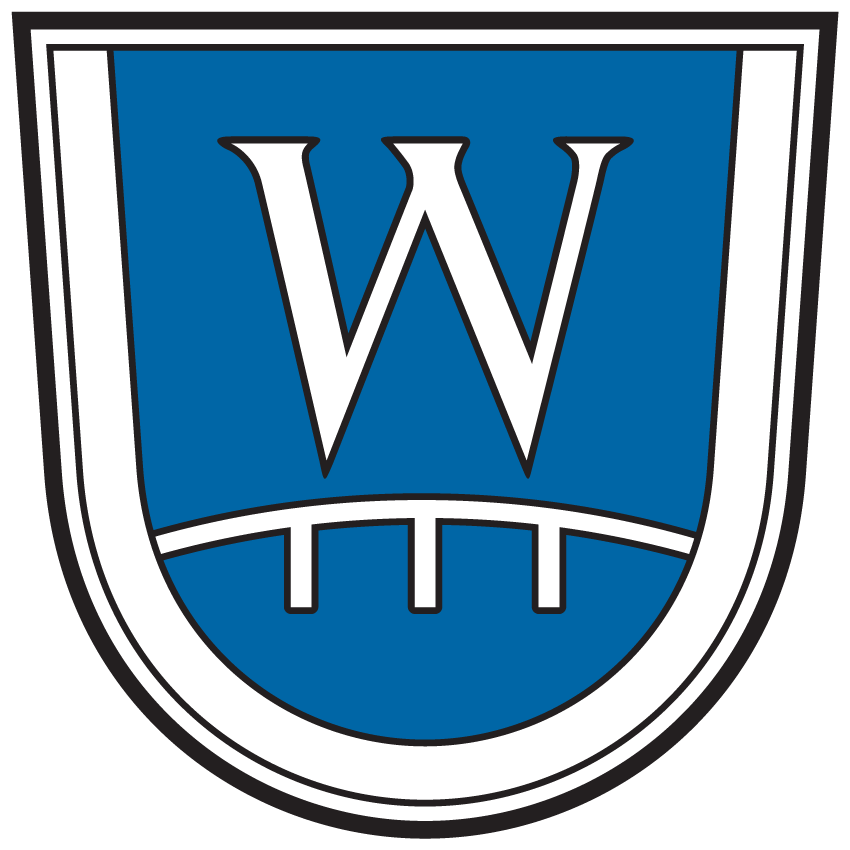
- Coat of arms

- Location within Austria
- Coordinates: 46°44′N 13°18′E
- Country: Austria
- State: Carinthia
- District: Spittal an der Drau

Government
  - Mayor: Karoline Turnschek (ÖVP)

Area
  - Total: 78.11 km^{2} (30.16 sq mi)
- Elevation: 945 m (3,100 ft)

Population (2018-01-01)
  - Total: 759
  - Density: 9.72/km^{2} (25.2/sq mi)
- Time zone: UTC+1 (CET)
  - Summer (DST): UTC+2 (CEST)
- Postal code: 9762
- Area code: 04713
- Vehicle registration: SP
- Website: gemeinde-weissensee.at

Weissensee (German: Weißensee [ˈvaɪsn̩ˌzeː]) is a municipality in the district of Spittal an der Drau in Carinthia, Austria.

== Geography ==
The lakeside resort is situated on the shore of the Weissensee within the Gailtal Alps mountain range. It can be reached via the Weissensee Road (B 87) leading from Greifenburg in the Drava Valley across the Kreuzberg Saddle to Gitschtal and Hermagor in the Gail Valley.

The municipal area comprises the cadastral community of Techendorf.

== History ==
In the centre of the town is a bridge across the lake, first mentioned in a 1348 deed. It was replaced by a reinforced concrete construction in 1967.

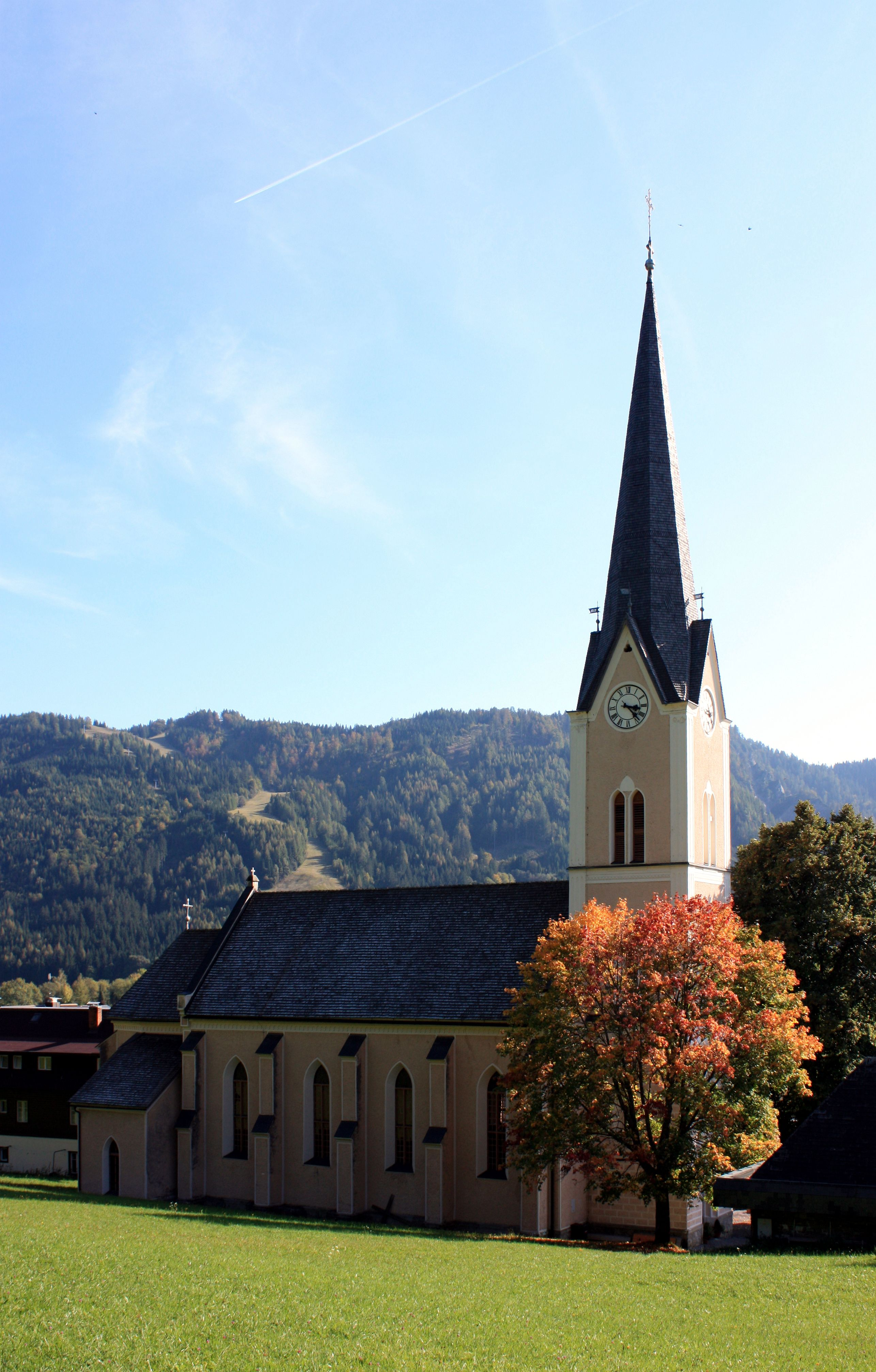
Protestant church

The Catholic church in the village of Gatschach was first documented in 1485. Nevertheless, Weissensee is one of the few municipalities in Austria with a Protestant majority (73.6% as of 2001). Not until the 1781 Patent of Toleration issued by the Habsburg emperor Joseph II could they confess themselves and be allowed to worship in a Bethaus (i.e. "pray house" – explicitly not a church). The present-day Neo-Gothic church in Techendorf was erected from 1900 to 1903.

The commune of Techendorf was established in 1850; the name was changed in 1968 for tourist reasons. Summer tourism around the lake is the main component of the local economy. Since 1989, an Alternative Elfstedentocht is organized there by the SWS (Stichting Winter Sporten) on the natural ice rink in winter.

In 1986, the ice chase scenes for James Bond movie The Living Daylights were shot in the town and vicinity.

== Politics ==
The municipal council (Gemeinderat) consists of eleven members. Since the 2021 local elections, it is made up of the following parties:

- Austrian People's Party (ÖVP): 6 seats
- Citizen's List Weißensee (BWL): 2 seats
- Social Democratic Party of Austria (SPÖ): 2 seats
- Freedom Party of Austria (FPÖ): 1 seat

The mayor of the municipality, Karoline Turnschek (ÖVP), was elected in 2021.
