= Farchtensee =

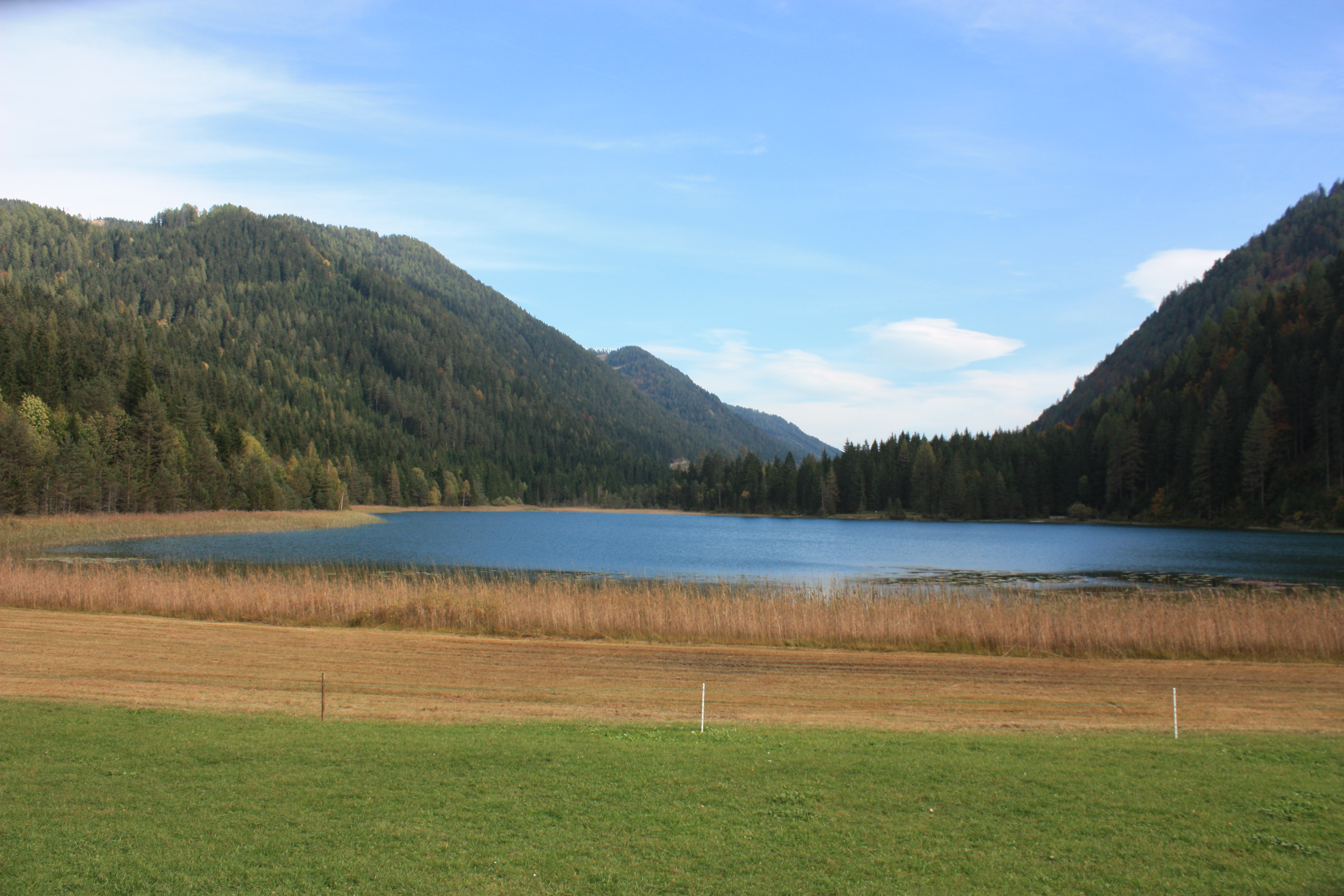

- Location within Austria
- Location: Carinthia, Austria
- Coordinates: 46.683°N 13.467°E
- Type: lake

Farchtensee is a lake of Carinthia, Austria. It is among the Gailtal Alps, near Weissensee (Carinthia).
