= Torkofel =

Mountain in Carinthia, Austria

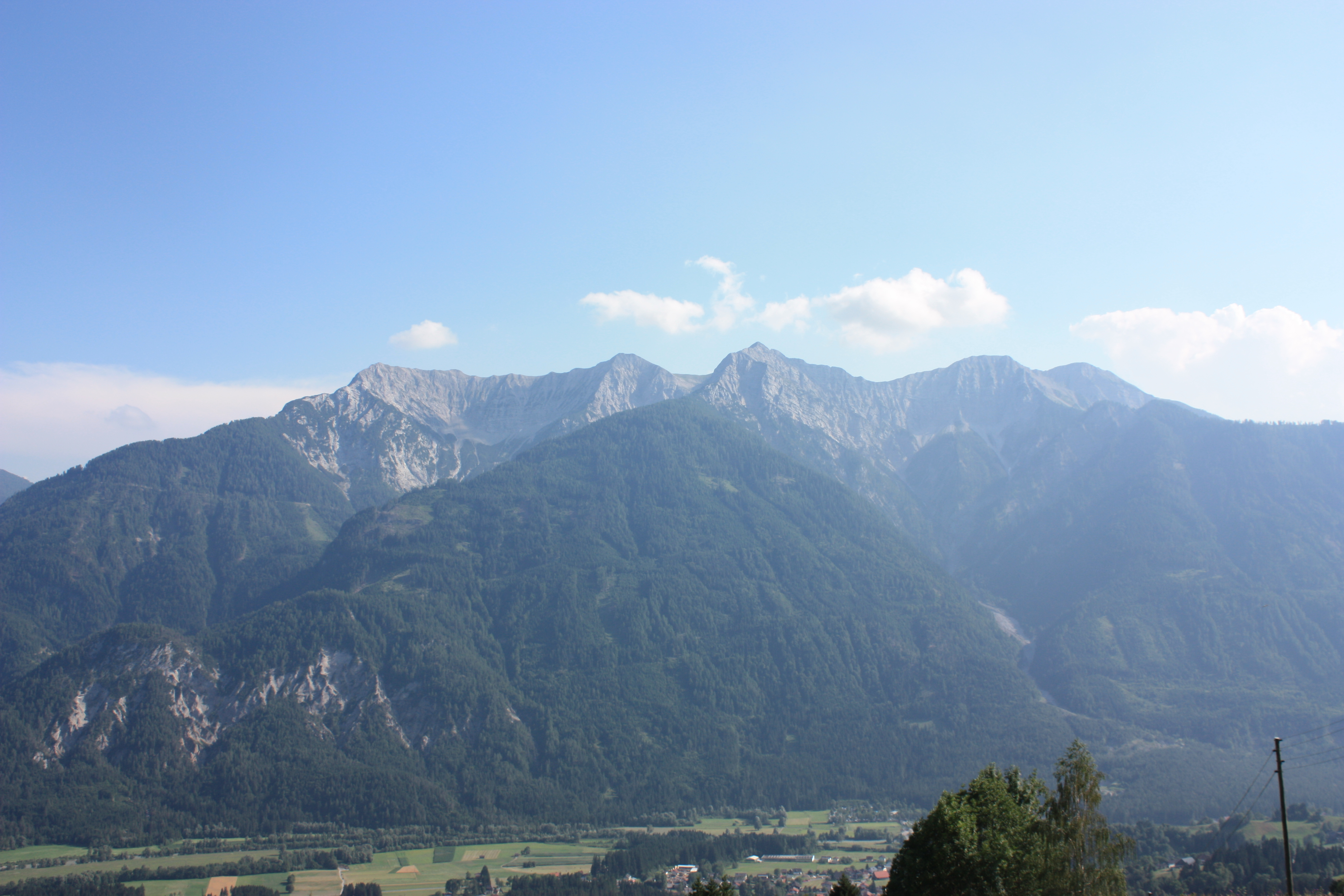
- Torkofel (centre) as part of the Jauken Massif.

Highest point
- Elevation: 2,276 m (7,467 ft)
- Prominence: 661 m (2,169 ft)
- Coordinates: 46°42′N 13°05′E

Geography
- Location within Alps
- Location: Carinthia, Austria
- Parent range: Gailtal Alps

Climbing
- First ascent: 1853

Torkofel (2,276 m) is a mountain of the Gailtal Alps in Carinthia, Austria. It is the highest summit of the Jauken Group, a small limestone massif west of Reißkofel. It lies between the Drava valley to the north and the Gail valley in the south. It was first climbed in 1853 by the Johann Festin von Wald and Paul Grohmann.
