= Latschur =

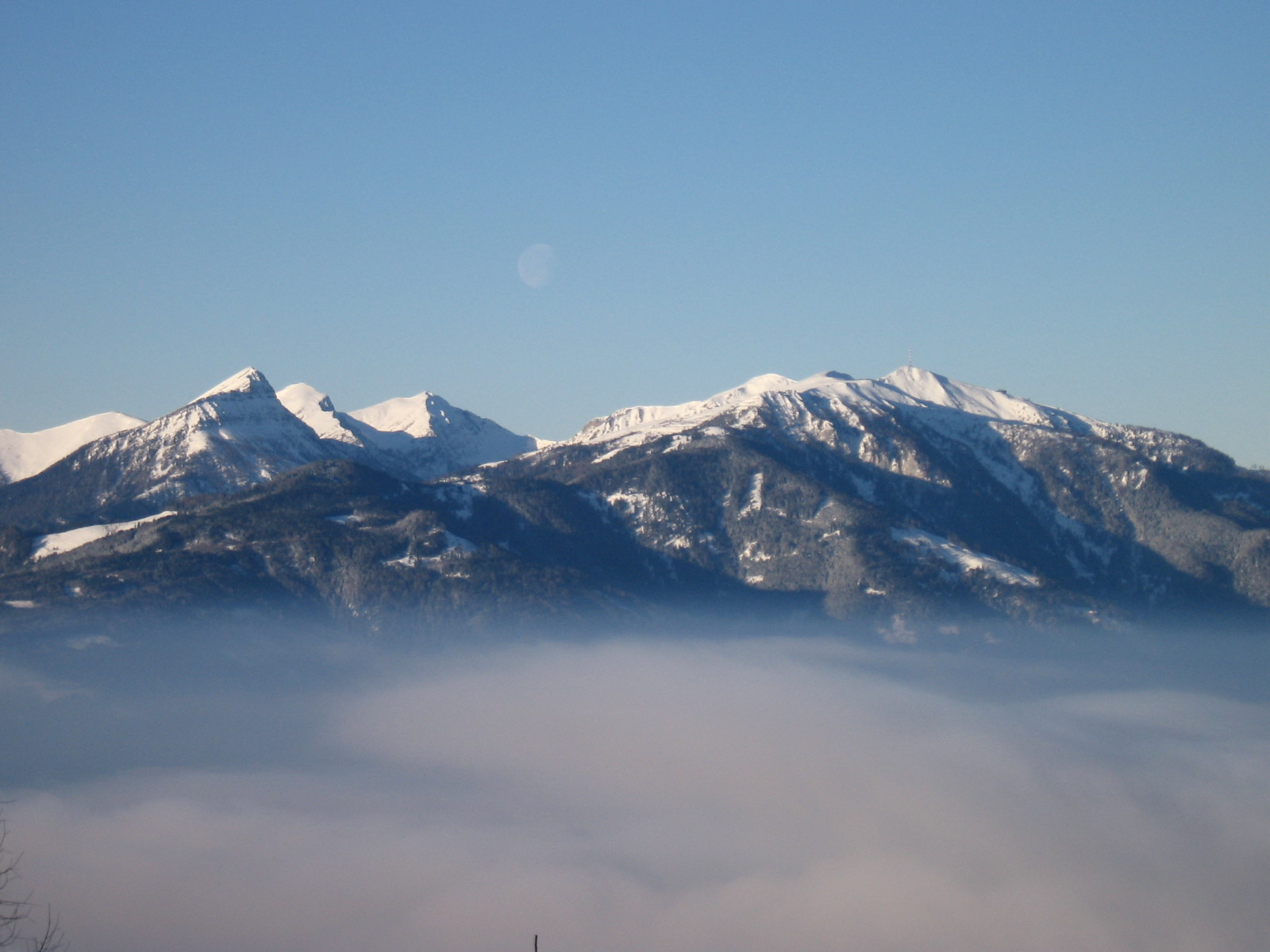
- View from the Nock Mountains

Highest point
- Elevation: 2,236 m (7,336 ft)
- Prominence: 1,268 m (4,160 ft)
- Coordinates: 46°44′N 13°24′E

Geography
- Location within Alps
- Location: Carinthia, Austria
- Parent range: Gailtal Alps

Latschur, at 2,236 m (7,336 ft), is the highest mountain of the Latschur Group in the Gailtal Alps range, in the Austrian state of Carinthia.

== Geography ==
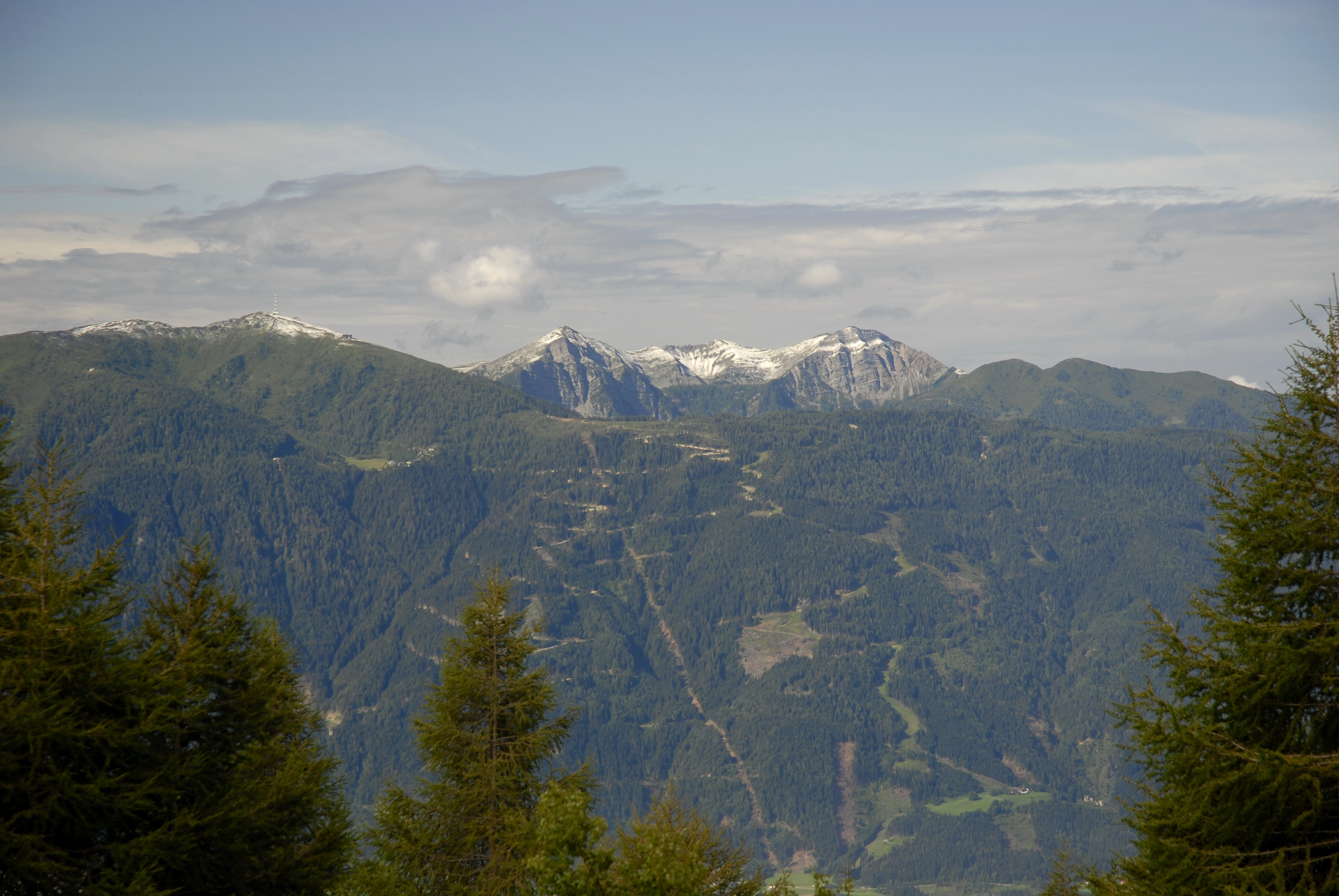
Goldeck and Latschur summits, view from northeast

The Latschur group stretches south and east of the Drava valley, from Weissensee lake to the river bend at Sachsenburg and the Goldeck peak near Spittal an der Drau. It is the geological continuation of the Kreuzeck group in the Hohe Tauern range north of the Drava, made up of crystalline primary rocks unlike the neighbouring ranges of the Southern Limestone Alps.

Mt. Latschur itself is a very prominent peak and a large, rounded grass mountain fairly easy to climb, although it can get crowded in the summer due to its popularity with hikers. The densely forested environment is home to endangered animal species like the griffon vulture and even brown bears have been sighted. Ski touring is a popular pastime during the winter.
