= Oberdrauburg =

- Municipality
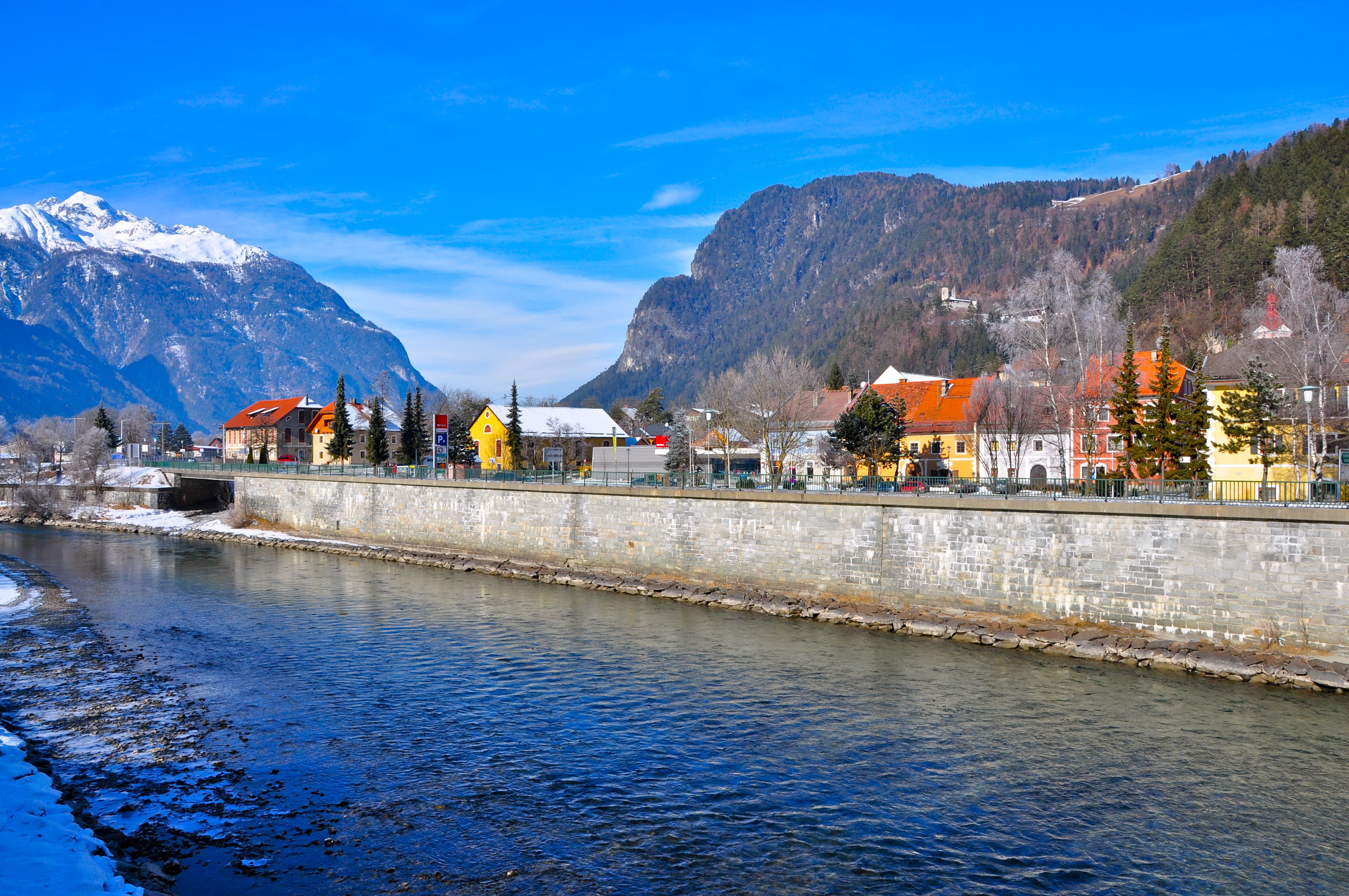
- Riverside and Carinthian Gate

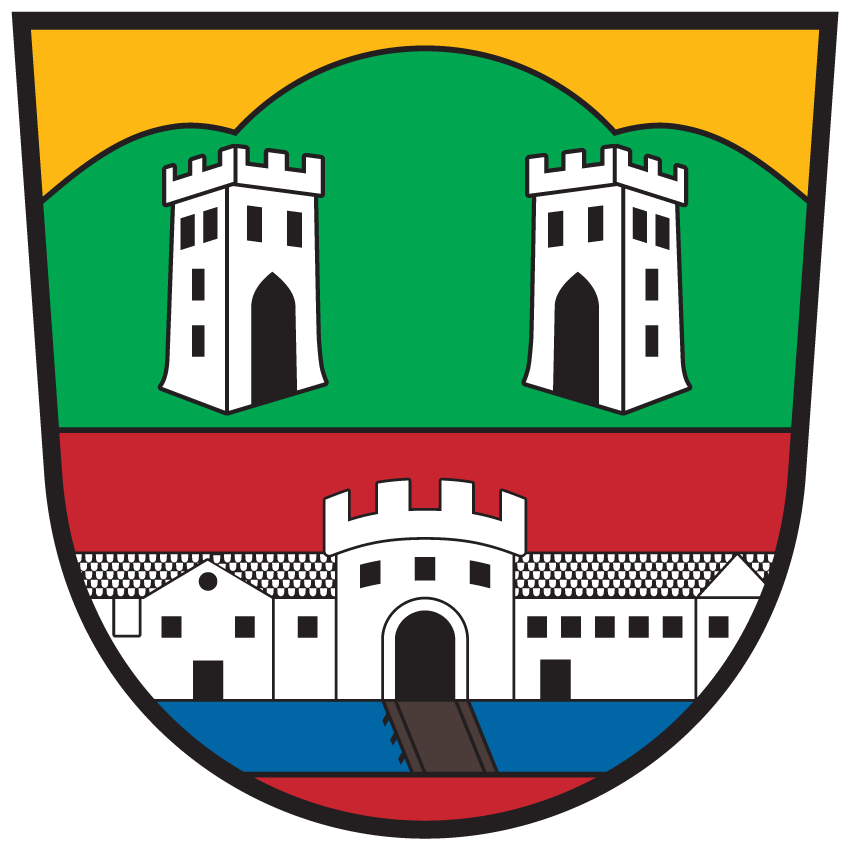
- Coat of arms

- Location within Austria
- Coordinates: 46°44′N 12°58′E
- Country: Austria
- State: Carinthia
- District: Spittal an der Drau

Government
  - Mayor: Stefan Brandstätter (ÖVP)

Area
  - Total: 69.93 km^{2} (27.00 sq mi)
- Elevation: 632 m (2,073 ft)

Population (2018-01-01)
  - Total: 1,172
  - Density: 16.76/km^{2} (43.41/sq mi)
- Time zone: UTC+1 (CET)
  - Summer (DST): UTC+2 (CEST)
- Postal code: 9781
- Area code: 04710
- Website: www.oberdrauburg.at

Oberdrauburg is a market town in the district of Spittal an der Drau at the western rim of the Austrian state of Carinthia.

== Geography ==
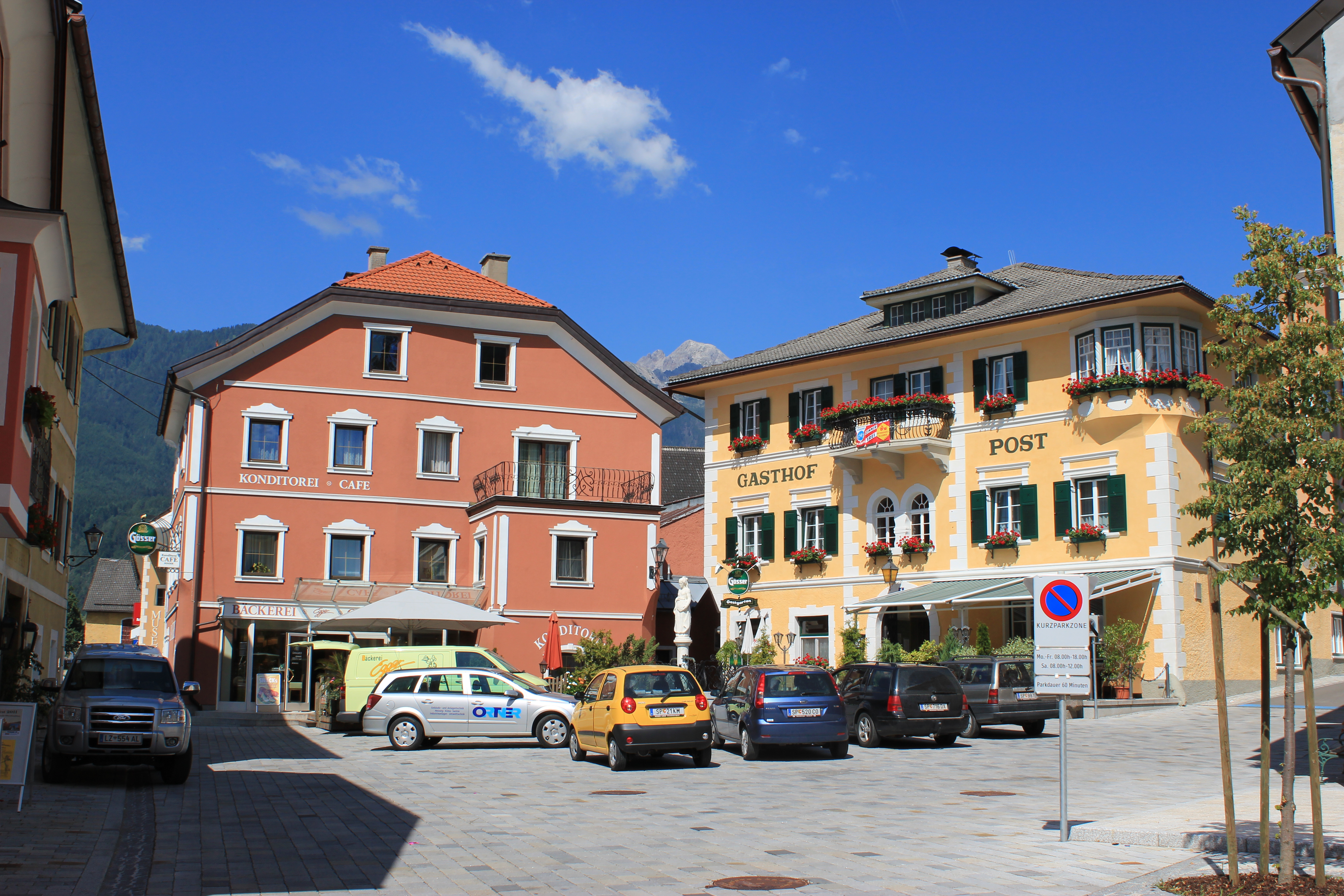
Market square

Oberdrauburg is near the Kärntner Tor (Carinthian Gate), a narrow place in the Drava Valley between the Gailtal Alps in the south and the Kreuzeck group of the Hohe Tauern range in the north, where the river crosses the border from East Tyrol to Carinthia. The town is about 20 km (12 mi) east of Lienz; in the west it shares a border with the Tyrolian municipality of Nikolsdorf. The municipal area includes the cadastral communities of Flaschberg and Zwickenberg.

Oberdrauburg is on the Drautal-Straße highway (Bundesstraße B 100) running from Spittal an der Drau to Lienz. Here the Plöckenpass-Straße B 110 highway branches off, leading via the Gailberg Saddle mountain pass to Kötschach-Mauthen in the Gail Valley. Rail transport is available at the Oberdrauburg Station of the Drautalbahn (Drava Valley Railway) line.

The name of the town corresponds with the town of Dravograd (Unterdrauburg) in Slovenia, where the Drava crosses the border from Carinthia to the historic Styria region.

== History ==
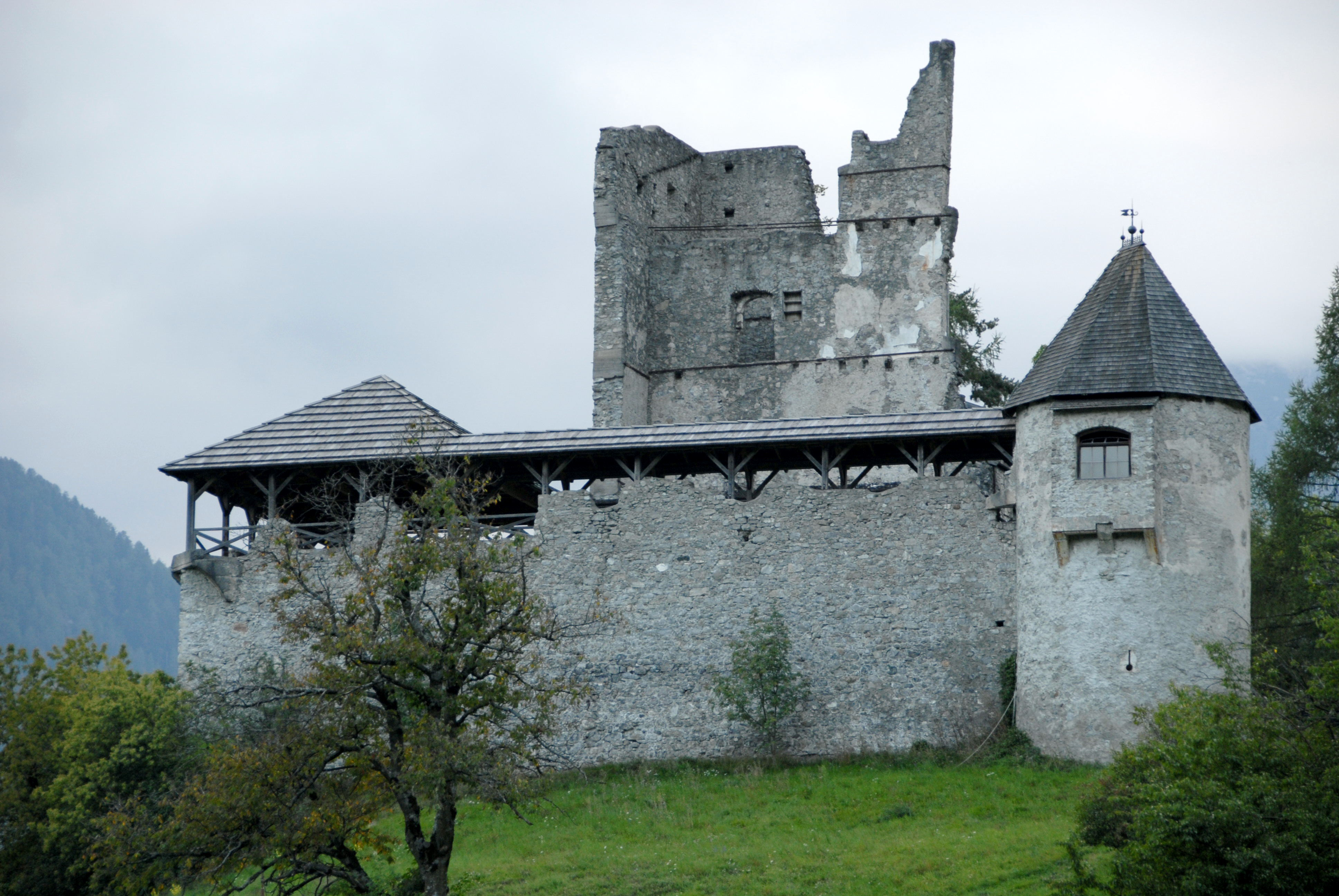
Hohenburg Castle

Archaeological findings indicate a continuous settlement of the area throughout Celtic and Roman times. Oberdrauburg Castle was first mentioned in a 1240 as a possession of the Carinthian duke Bernhard von Spanheim. During the 13th century a settlement arose beneath the castle near the branch-off of the Gailberg Saddle road.

In 1292 Oberdrauburg was held by the Meinhardiner House of Gorizia at Lienz. In 1308 it appears as a fief of the Archbishopric of Salzburg. It received market rights in 1325 and further benefited from its convenient location at the crossroads. From 1385 it was held by the Counts of Ortenburg and, with the Ortenburg possessions, it was inherited by Count Hermann II of Celje in 1418. Upon the death of Hermann's grandson Count Ulrich II of Celje in 1456, it passed to the Austrian House of Habsburg. Archduke Ferdinand I of Austria granted the estates to his treasurer Gabriel von Salamanca in 1524.

== Politics ==
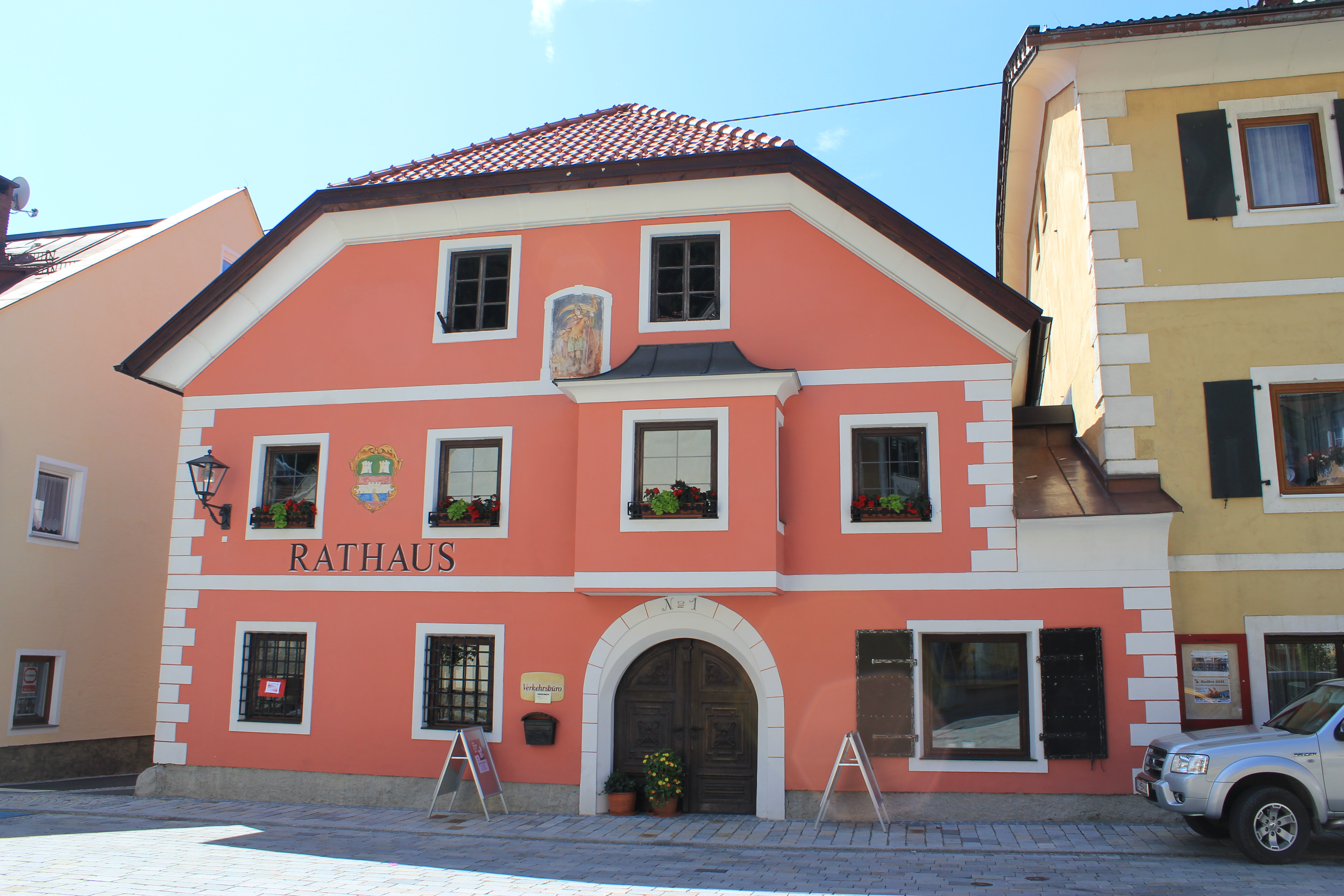
Town hall

Seats in the municipal assembly (Gemeinderat) as of 2015 local elections:

- Austrian People's Party (ÖVP): 7
- Social Democratic Party of Austria (SPÖ): 4
- Initiative Aufschwung Oberdrauburg (Independent): 4

== Twin towns ==
Oberdrauburg is twinned with:

- Türkenfeld, Germany since 1990
- Signa, Italy since 1996
- Paluzza, Italy

== Notable people ==
Notable people that were born or lived in Oberdrauburg include:

- Friedrich Marx (1830-1905), Austrian writer and officer
- Franz Jochum (born 1944), politician
- Hellmuth Marx (1915–2002), sculptor
- Roland Schwarzl (born 1980), olympic track and field athlete
