= Hellmuth Marx =

Austrian sculptor (1915–2002)

Hellmuth Marx (17 June 1915 – 1 January 2002) was an Austrian sculptor.

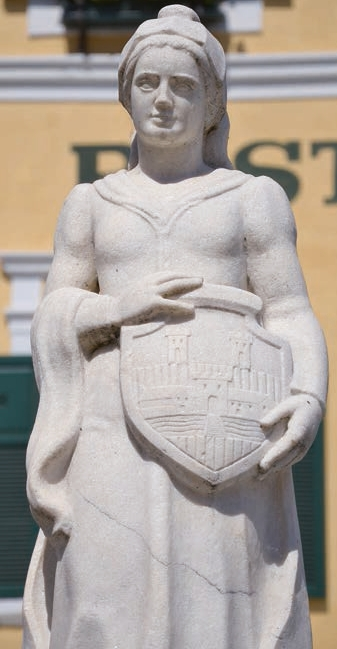
Fountain figure of Oberdrauburg by Hellmuth Marx

== Life ==
Marx was born in Linz, Austria as the last of five children. Sisters: Modesta, Maria, Melitta and Marzella. Pets: Harras (dog) and Hella (horse). His father, Viktor Marx (1870–1928), an officer in the army of the Austro-Hungarian Empire, came from Graz. His mother, Clara Marx née Pichler (1876–1948), came from Oberdrauburg in Carinthia where her family ran a restaurant, "Gasthof Post". Marx attended the Marieninstitut in Graz from 1926 to 1933. This private school was run by Catholic clerics, who were open-minded regarding sports and arts.

1933 Hellmuth Marx took up his studies at the Graz University of Technology. He studied architecture for three and a half years. At the same time he enrolled at the Styrian school of arts with Daniel Pauluzzi, Alfred Wickenburg and Fritz Silberbauer as professors. It is likely that he also attended the master class for wood and stone sculpting run by Wilhelm Gösser, son of the sculptor Hans Brandstetter and creator of several monuments in the city of Graz.

1938/39 Marx was drafted for military service in Klagenfurt and, consequently, sent to the front at the Norwegian Sea. The turmoils of war brought him to Lapland (former province of Finland), Finland and Norway, as far as Narvik. He interrupted his military service from May 1939 to January 1940 to be able to take the entrance exam for the sculptors' school at the Academy of Fine Arts Vienna. He passed and got permission to take a sabbatical for his studies during the winter of 1941/42. According to his nature, Marx largely suppressed the bad impression of the war. But he treasured the beauty of the Nordic landscape and the charm of the girls there and their traditional costumes. As presents to his mother and to his aunt he fabricated small wooden figures such as a madonna with the help of hardly anything else but a pocket knife (1942).

After World War II, he returned to Vienna in 1946/47 and continued his studies at the Academy of Fine Arts Vienna, at the master class for sculpting with Josef Müllner. In 1948 he moved to Heiligenblut/Carinthia to live with his mother and two of his sisters. From 1948 on Hellmuth Marx started to work as a freelancer. After years of commuting he moved to Oberdrauburg permanently. He lived and worked in his family's house, the "Stainernhaus" in the town square. Marx was known as a rather introverted, modest and always polite man. His work seems to mirror his personality rather than call for deserved credit. Maybe he was not duly valued as an artist by his surroundings but rather seen as a craftsman, albeit a very skilled one, who was always willing to help out when asked to repair objects of any material. His contributions to the aesthetics of the town of Oberdrauburg as well as to that of many homes and sacred buildings may speak for themselves. He died on 1 January 2002 in Lienz/East Tyrol.

== Oeuvre ==
Hellmuth Marx created mainly sculptures but also paintings with the human body as a dominating subject. Throughout his career, he continued to draw and paint, work that had been part of his formation as a sculptor. Many watercolour and oil paintings - the latter mostly worked on fibreboard, but also on canvas - are conserved. Later on he also took to photography. The negative images of his photographs, including many portraits, have been lost. Research is going on concerning a heretofore unknown marble sculpture, the so-called "Geiger-Statue", which has surfaced in January 2016 near downtown Lienz. There are no documents in the archives concerning this remarkable white marble sculpture of St. Florian.

Regarding his style, Marx was oriented towards the neoclassical tendencies of the 1920s and 1930s. He remained true to his style even against the notion of the upcoming Avantgarde. He created several sculptures for the market town of Oberdrauburg, e. g. the fountain figure depicting a young citizen woman wearing the traditional costume of the region and holding the crest of the town. Hellmuth Marx created his sculptures mainly from marble, clay, granite, sandstone and plaster. However, his preferred material was wood. When the huge lime tree that characterized the view of Oberdrauburg's main square had to be cut down it became the material of numerous carvings and wooden sculptures.

Marx took part in exhibitions of the Künstlerhaus Klagenfurt. His sculpture "Mutter und Kind" (Mother and Child) has been incorporated in the 21er Haus, museum of contemporary arts of the Belvedere, Vienna.

The restoration of sacral buildings was an important part of Marx' work.

== Gallery ==
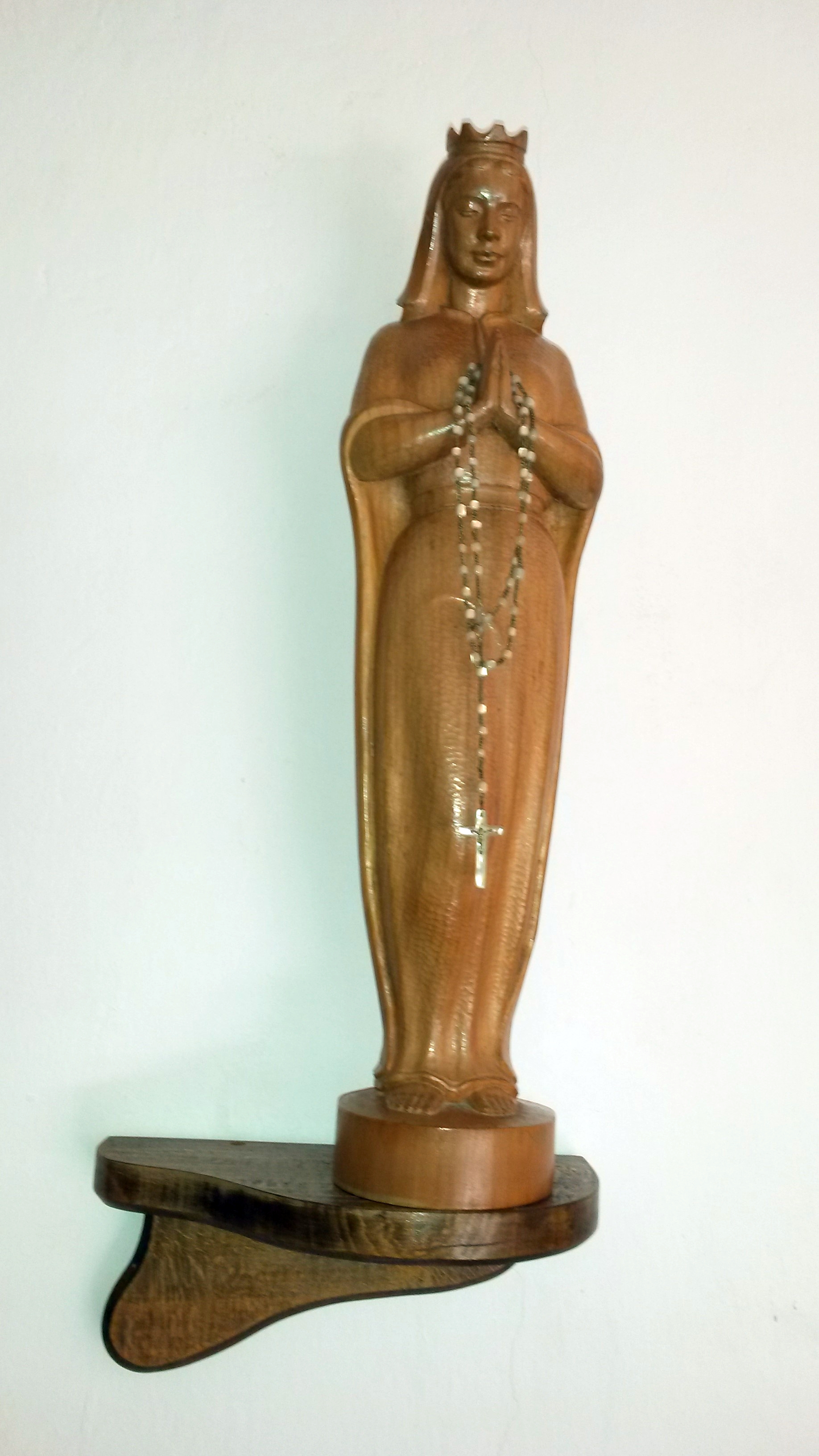

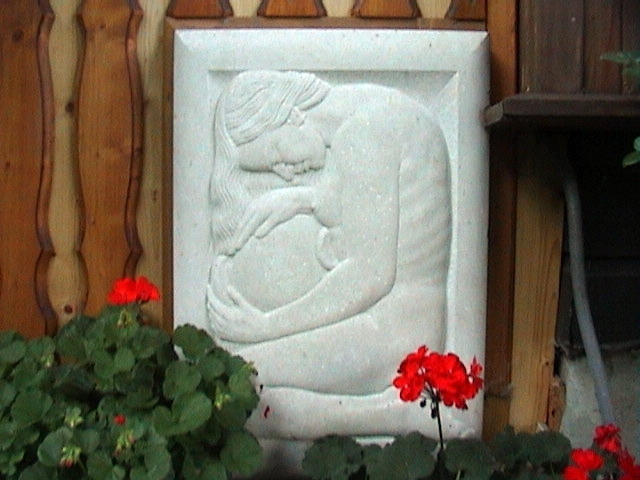
