= Underwater ice hockey =

Freediving variant of ice hockey played upside-down under the ice

Underwater ice hockey (also called sub-aqua ice hockey) is a minor extreme sport that is a variant of ice hockey. It is played upside-down underneath frozen pools or ponds. Participants wear diving masks, fins, and wetsuits and use the underside of the frozen surface as the playing area or rink for a floating puck. Competitors do not use any breathing apparatus but instead surface for air every 30 seconds or so.

It is not to be confused with underwater hockey, in which the floor of a swimming pool and a sinking puck are used.

== History ==
Underwater ice hockey is an extreme sport that requires a considerable amount of breath-holding skills, training, and patience in order to finish unscathed. The sport, UIC, originated in Austria in 2005 when an apnea diver, also known as breath-hold diving, skin diving, or freediving, named Christian Redl from Austria came up with the sport. The idea behind the sport was to take the enjoyment of hockey and turn it into an extreme sport that most divers would be fond of. The first world championship game took place in Weissensee, Austria, in 2007, where teams competed below 12 inches of ice in 35.6 °F or 2 °C water. Water freezes at 32 °F, or 0 °C. At these temperatures, the ice will be thick enough to support the weight of spectators, equipment, and tents to keep people warm while also providing a safe under-ice rink for competitors. This means that finding a location for the matches proved difficult because officials and organizers are required to find an area of ice that was thick enough to hold the weight of all the spectators, and safety officials for the free divers were needed.

This 2007 match was the first recorded Underwater Ice Hockey World Championship game; however, this was not the first ever match to be played. There were two matches before this, one in 2005 and one in 2006, where founder and organizer Christian Redl mobilized teams from around Europe to participate. The first match in 2005 was between Austria and Germany, which ended in an 8–8 tie. The second match in 2006 was between Austria and Slovakia, which ended in a 9–8 victory for Austria. Since then, one other world championship game was held in 2013, also at Weissensee, Austria. Both of these matches were organized by founder Christian Redl in hopes of furthering the sport, and over the last 12 years, Redl has been successful in bringing this minor extreme sport to the world; however, due to the nature of the activity, it is still limited to extreme sport enthusiasts and apnea divers. Historically, the aspect of the game that has drawn a lot of apnea divers, especially apnea divers under ice, is the conditions in which the sport is played. It involves a lot of skills that come with free diving, such as holding breath for a prolonged period of time, the ability to disorient between up and down, and the sheer excitement of playing a high-risk sport.

=== Founder ===
The sport was created by free diver Christian Redl with help from his friend and training partner, Jaromir Foukal. Redl started his career in apnea diving after watching the movie The Big Blue, released in 1988, starring Jean-Marc Barr, Jean Reno, and Rosanna Arquette and directed by Luc Besson. This movie inspired Redl to take his love for diving to another level, and later that year, in 1996, he attended the first world apnea diving championships in Nice, France. In 1998, Redl formed his own team to take part in the second world championships in free diving. In 2003, Christian Redl set his first freediving world record, but this was not the end of his record-breaking career. Over the next decade, Redl would go on to break multiple world records, paving the way for others to follow in his footsteps and set new ones. Some of his world records include line diving under ice with a distance of 200 meters, which he achieved in 2016, and deep dives under ice with a depth of 61 meters and a weight lasting 1 minute and 51 seconds, which he achieved in 2011.

After his experience in apnea diving, Redl took his love for underwater sports to the next level by creating underwater ice hockey while also starting a school to teach people how to properly free dive. Organizer Christian Redl said, "After diving a lot under ice, I wondered which sports had the potential to be played underneath ice, and that's when the hockey game was born. The matches are very fast-paced, so the amount of time that divers are under the water is not that long - plus the water is extremely cold and you can get disoriented very easily." Furthermore, Christian Redl has seen some success in television and film by being a stuntman in television broadcasts like Medicopter 117 and Coast Guard and appearing on the TV total late-night show with Stefan Raab in 1999. Redl's activities in apnea diving and underwater ice hockey have put him in a good position to be a stuntman. Another thing he has done in his film career was a little-known music video called "On My Way" by DJ Friction, which involves underwater ice diving. Also, in 2002, Redl went to Roatan Island to film an advertising film for Seimens Medical, which also involved diving. On top of his film career, Redl has also written some books about his life, projects, and free diving. A couple of these books are called "Free Diving - My World in Pictures" in 2006 and "Mastering Boundaries through Mental Strength - Safe Diving" in 2010. One of the last achievements that sets Redl out from the crowd is that he does not confine himself to one location or hemisphere to do what he loves. He takes his love all over the world, from the North Pole (Greenland and Iceland) to Antarctica, where he continues to push the limits of the human body. 67

== Competition ==
The first Underwater Ice Hockey World Cup was held at Weissensee, Austria, in February 2007. Finland finished first, followed by Austria and Slovakia. The other playing nations were the Czech Republic, Germany, the Netherlands, Poland, and Slovenia. The second Underwater Ice Hockey World Cup was held in February 2013 at Weissensee, Austria, with Austria winning the championship.

The first match took place in 2005 and consisted of two teams. The first teams were Austria; founders Christian Redl and Jaromir Foukal, versus the German team of Philipp Von Heydebreck and Knut Stender. This match resulted in an 8–8 tie.

The second match took place in 2006 and also consisted of two teams. The first team was again the Austrian team, consisting of Christian Redl and Jaromir Foukal, and the Slovak team of Erik Toček and Juraj Karpiš. The game ended in a 9:8 victory for Austria.

The next match took place in 2007 and was the first world championship. This game consisted of eight teams: Austria, Germany, Finland, Holland, Slovenia, the Czech Republic, Slovakia, and Poland. The winner of the match was Finland, and the runner-up was Austria.

In 2013, the second Underwater Ice Hockey World Championships took place. This game consisted of two men's teams (Austria and Germany) and two mixed teams (Austria B and Germany B). The winner of the tournament was Austria, and the runner-up was Germany. Austria B finished third. The title decider ended in a 9:6 redemption victory for Austria.

== Rules ==
=== Rink ===
Underwater ice hockey is played upside down underneath a 6-meter-wide by 8-meter-long rink in a frozen lake, pond, or swimming pool. Most rinks are 3 × 6 meters, each side fronted by a goal that is fastened to the ice underneath the surface. Some rinks are 6 × 8 meters. The air temperature is generally around −5 °C (23 °F). The water is around 2 °C (36 °F). As long as the ice is frozen, whether natural or unnatural, it is okay for the players to play.

The rink is completed with side hoardings as well, including sponsor names, much like any typical sport, to support the funding for the event. The hoardings are long enough that the puck generally will not go out of bounds. The depth of the water varies, but it is at least over 3 meters, much like a regular pool.

=== Air holes ===
Safety precautions are a big part of underwater hockey. Before each game starts, one of the rescue divers uses a chainsaw to cut holes in the rink so the players can get in and get out. Because divers can easily get disoriented during a game, in case one of them is too exhausted to reach the hole or can’t find it, four divers equipped with oxygen tanks supervise every match. Several large holes, 2 x 1 meters, are cut in the ice next to the rink so that players can easily rise to the surface for air. Each hole is marked with a big national flag to avoid confusion. The holes are located perpendicular to the nets (on the long side of the rink where a bench would be located in any sport), where players in hockey would typically sub in and out. The holes are large enough to fit the divers and support divers who could quickly dive in and get to anybody who needs help. Some rinks even have holes in the ice located within the nets in case a diver is not able to swim over to the side of the rink.

The players should have good breath-holding skills. Players typically stay underwater for 30–60 seconds before swapping with a teammate, much like they do in hockey when switching from offense to defense. With each breath, a player swaps with a teammate. Players do not typically come up for air, then go back down. Instead, they swap with their teammate every 30 to 60 seconds to allow them to recover. Both teams will generally swap players at the same time in order to keep the game competitive. A well-trained team would know when their teammate needs to switch out. Determining the optimum stick-switching interval is quite tricky. A shorter interval assures the player enough air for a power play, on the one hand, but on the other hand, it increases the time during which both players are under ice, since the stick shift is done during play and, in extreme cases, far away from the breathing hole.

They are not allowed to play with any kind of breathing apparatus during competitive play. However, some practice with scuba tanks. The majority of the players, who are called apnea divers, freedive often and have prepared accordingly.

=== Equipment ===
Participants wear diving masks, fins, and wetsuits and use the underside of the frozen surface as the playing area for a floating puck they guide with hockey sticks. They wear the masks to see underwater and have them as tight as they can keep them so they will not get knocked off during play. The fins help propel them to move quicker through the water. The wetsuits help keep them warm in almost freezing temperatures.

The hockey sticks are like normal ice hockey sticks. They float in the water in case a player drops them with contact. The puck is usually a 10-inch Styrofoam puck. Because it is Styrofoam, it floats underneath the surface of the ice, so players are playing hockey upside down. There have even been instances of the puck being made of light wood as well. As long as the puck floats, they are able to play.

=== Gameplay ===
With a start signal from the referee you would instantly turn belly up under the ice and zoom towards the centre of the field, seeking the advantage accruing to the first to reach the puck. Underwater ice hockey is played one-on-one with teams of two. Both men and women play together and against each other. However, there are four teams that play during each event.

Considering matches can get pretty physical, players need to surface about every 30 seconds for a breath of fresh air. Underwater ice hockey periods last 10 minutes, and players are allowed 10-minute breaks to warm up. Just like in ice hockey, they guide a puck into the opposing team’s goal while diving underwater.

There are four referees that are equipped with scuba gear and watch over the game, monitoring aggression levels and ensuring that the players are safe. The game is played like regular hockey, except with fewer players. The game can get aggressive as players constantly have to surface for air.

== Risks ==
While there have been no serious injuries documented in underwater ice hockey, the game does pose serious health risks. Medical teams are prepared on the surface to treat apnea divers the minute they surface in case of any serious problem or emergency. Ideally, in case of an emergency, the apnea diver would swim back to the entrance in the ice they came from, or the closest one available. If the diver cannot make it to the surface of the water in time, people equipped with oxygen tanks who supervise the game can make sure they make it above water. The rescue/safety squad from there can give medical attention to the player. Players of underwater ice hockey are expected to understand the risks and know how to act accordingly to the given situation. Although there are expert divers and safety divers available to monitor the sport throughout the entire match. Apnea divers are also trained on safety procedures to minimize incidents. Since the game is slower in comparison to underwater hockey or ice hockey, there is a lower risk of puck- and hockey stick-related injuries. In underwater hockey, there is a higher risk of breaking fingers due to a fast-moving puck because players are lower to the ground and, therefore, physically closer to the puck. Underwater ice hockey, however, is played with ice hockey sticks and moves at a much slower pace than both games. Given the freezing temperatures, apnea divers in the sport are at high risk for:

Hypothermia: While usual symptoms are obvious, such as shivering and fast breathing, support divers have to look out for less obvious signs such as dizziness and lack of coordination. Particular dangers of serious hypothermia must be watched out for in the signs so they can make it in time to pull the player out of the water, as signs of severe hypothermia cannot be seen underwater. Slurred speech, confusion, no concern for the condition from the player, a weak pulse, and shallow breathing must be closely monitored and treated immediately.

Asphyxiation: Underwater ice hockey is typically played without breathing apparatus. Only supervising divers wear oxygen tanks while playing; apnea divers wear diving masks for visibility. To prevent loss of consciousness due to lack of oxygen, players are switched every thirty to sixty seconds. Supervising safety divers can assist an apnea diver if they are unable to reach the surface before losing consciousness. So far, the safety teams have been able to retrieve everyone.

Frostbite: With the frozen temperatures, medical teams must be on alert for any signs of frostbite. While there have been no recorded incidents, the risk of frostbite is very high. Most are not fully aware of the signs of frostbite, as they could come off as typical discomforts. Frost-nip is the earliest of frostbite, where skin may get irritated and turn red. Other signs include itchiness or a burning feeling in the afflicted area. Affected skin may turn shiny or hard before going into the final stages of frostbite. Most are unaware of when they are at risk for frostbite because the affected area eventually loses feeling, and people suffering from frostbite may feel warm even though their skin is cold to the touch. Medical teams must be wary of early signs of frostbite before the final stage, where skin turns blue and nerve damage occurs. Treatment for frostbite is to immediately choose means that increase blood flow in those areas to minimize damage. Dead skin must be removed, and the subject must be warmed. Pain medication is typically administered for nerve pain that can occur during the warming process. For minor frostbitten conditions, ibuprofen pain relievers may be used to reduce inflammation. Blood thinners may also be taken to help prevent damage to nerves. The first response to treatment for frostbite is to dry the skin off and take the patient indoors to warm up.

Most risks are preventable with the use of exposure suits. Wetsuits are typically pre-warmed with warm water in order to keep divers warm throughout a frozen competition. Three-finger mitts are usually recommended. Smaller body parts such as fingers, toes, ears, and the nose are at the highest risk for frostbite and are the most vital to keep covered and warmed. Divers are also warned against heavy exercise after resurfacing from the ice. Decompression sickness has not been studied enough for the extreme cold, and any measures taken to prevent it is recommended.

== Sponsors ==
Sponsors, such as Omega, sponsored the tournament in Austria at Weissensee in 2007; furthermore, any organization, company, or individual may sponsor the matches or a championship game. However, unlike in ice hockey, where sponsor banners are plastered on the walls of the rink, in underwater ice hockey, banners are attached under the ice on either side of the goal posts so that they may be seen while the game is recorded underwater.

== Spectators ==
Because the game is not played in an arena where spectators can see apnea divers through a monitor that is set on top of the ice, the spectators have to sit on top of the surface of the ice to watch the game being played underwater. This is done by a cameraman that follows the game underwater, recording the action while apnea divers compete under the ice, making it possible for others to watch the game above the ice. Unlike most professional games, the monitor watched is not a large screen that is visible to a large audience. Instead, it is an average-sized monitor (about 27 inches diagonally), which is then protected from the elements with a tarp. Resurfaced players are also able to view the game on the monitor before switching out with their teammate.

Spectators should dress appropriately for the conditions. The safety teams are there for the benefit of spectators and players alike.
