= Kreuzberg Saddle =

Mountain pass of the Gailtal Alps, in Carinthia, Austria

Kreuzberg Saddle (Kreuzbergsattel)
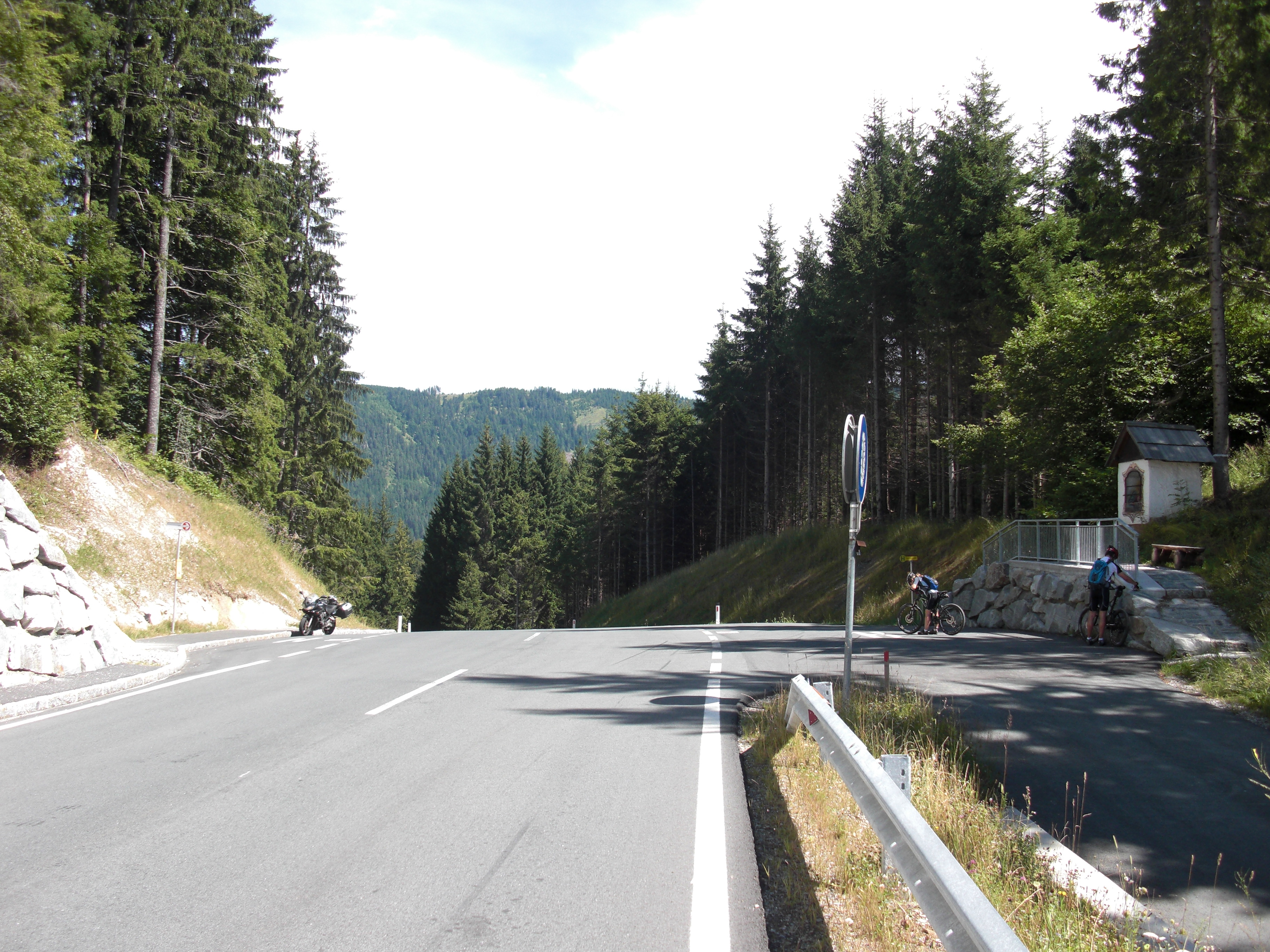
- Top of the pass

- Location within Alps
- Elevation: 1,074 metres (3,524 ft)

Third Approach
- Location: Austria
- Range: Alps
- Coordinates: 46°45′N 13°11′E

Kreuzberg Saddle (German: Kreuzbergsattel) is a high mountain pass across the Gailtal Alps in the Austrian state of Carinthia.

The 1,074 m (3,524 ft) high pass is part of the B 87 Weißensee Straße highway connecting the market town of Greifenburg in the Drava valley with Gitschtal and the district capital Hermagor on the Gail river. The road runs beneath the Reißkofel massif in the west; to the east, a branch-off leads to Lake Weissensee.

== See also ==
- List of highest paved roads in Europe
- List of mountain passes
