= Reißkofel =

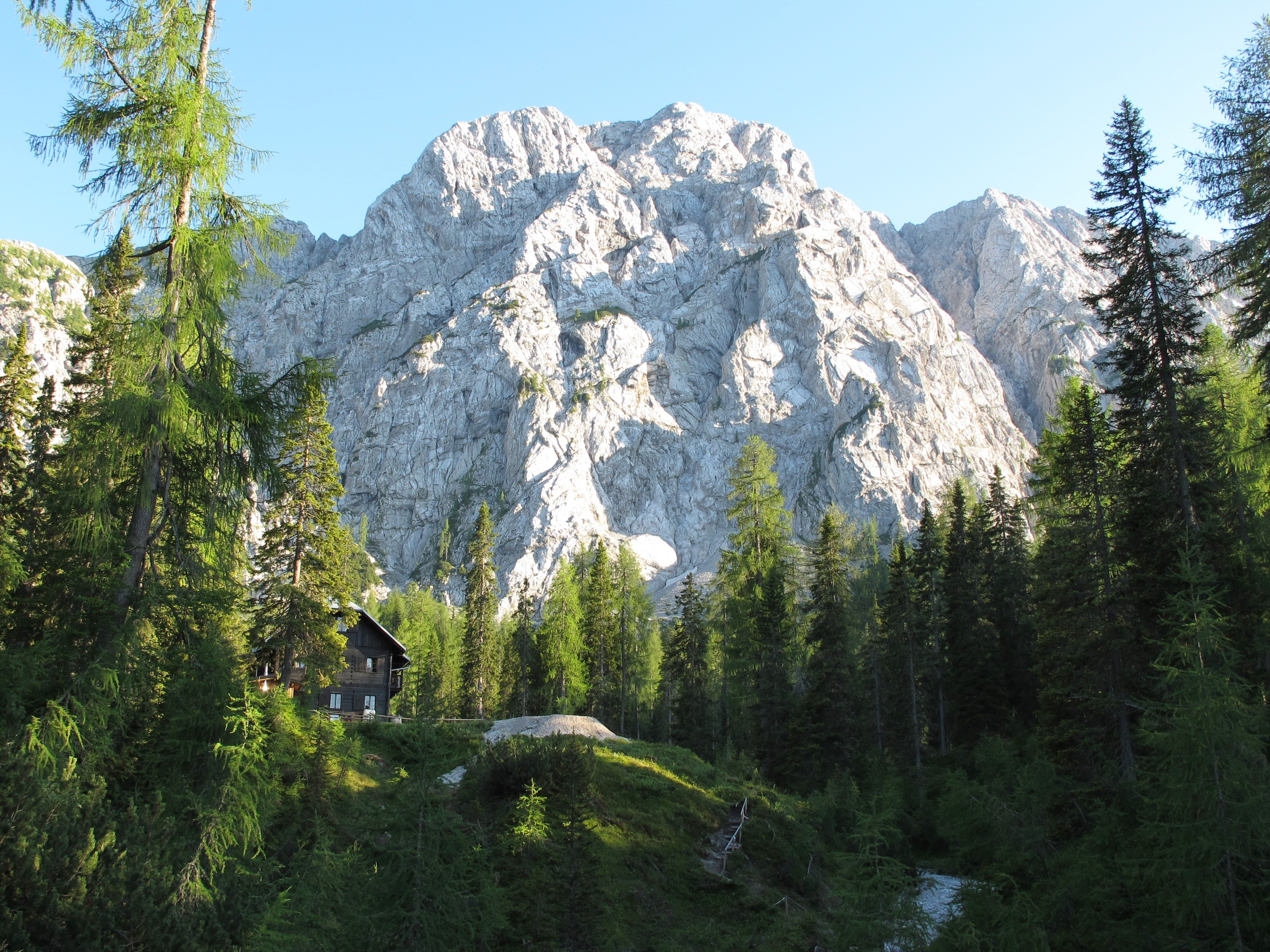
- Reißkofel with Compton Hut

Highest point
- Elevation: 2,371 m (7,779 ft)
- Prominence: 1,390 m (4,560 ft)
- Coordinates: 46°41′N 13°09′E

Geography
- Location within Alps
- Location: Carinthia, Austria
- Parent range: Gailtal Alps

Climbing
- First ascent: 1848

The Reißkofel is, at 2,371 metres above the Adriatic (7,779 ft), the highest mountain of the Gailtal Alps east of the Lienz Dolomites. It is situated in the centre of the Gailtal range, part of the Southern Limestone Alps, in the Austrian state of Carinthia.

The steep massif is mainly composed of Corallian Limestone and Dolomite. It is a dominant peak, having a prominence of some 1,390 m (4,560 ft), as it is situated amongst much lower peaks. It lies between the Drava valley in the north, near the town of Greifenburg, and the Gail valley to the south, both of which it dominates, towering over the valleys some 1,700 m (5,600 ft) below it. The mountain is the culminating point of a long ridge, and is steep and rocky on both its northern and southern faces. It was first climbed in 1848 by Johann Festin von Wald.

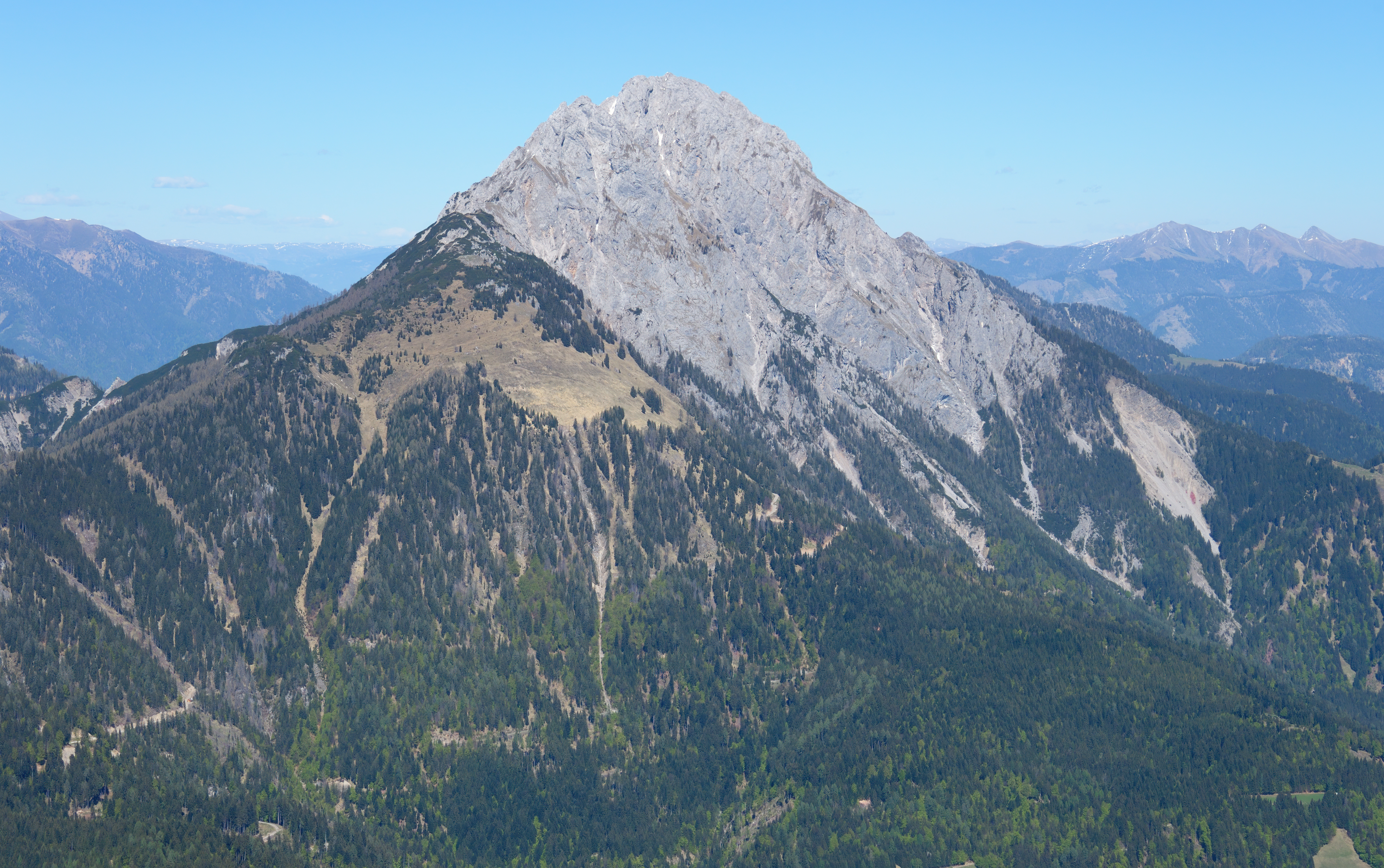
Aerial view of Reißkofel
