= Gailtal Alps =

Austrian mountain chain

- German: Gailtaler Alpen, Drauzug
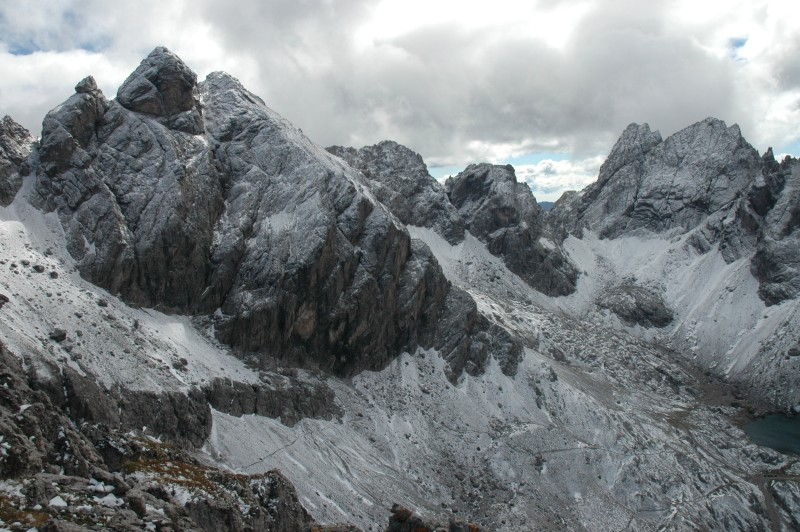
- Große Sandspitze, the highest peak in the range

Highest point
- Peak: Große Sandspitze
- Elevation: 2,770 m (9,090 ft)
- Coordinates: 46°46′0″N 12°48′42″E

Dimensions
- Length: 100 km (62 mi)

Geography
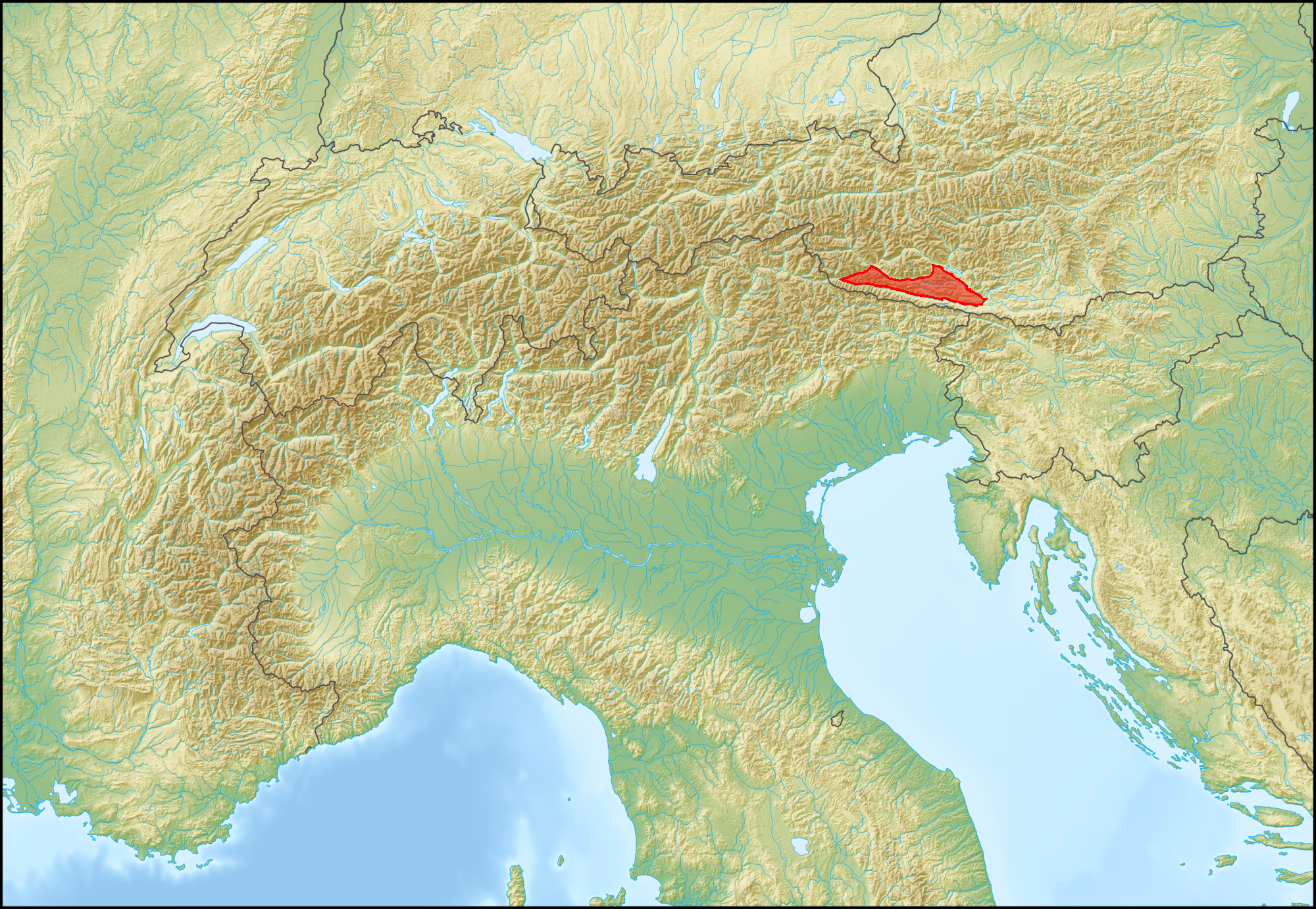
- The Gailtal Alps (in red) within the Alps. The borders of the range according to Alpine Club classification of the Eastern Alps
- Country: Austria
- States: Carinthia and Tyrol (East Tyrol)
- Parent range: Southern Limestone Alps; Carnic and Gailtal Alps and Alps

Geology
- Orogeny: Alpine orogeny
- Rock type: Limestone

The Gailtal Alps (German: Gailtaler Alpen or Drauzug), is a mountain range of the Southern Limestone Alps in Austria. It rises between the River Drava (Drau) and the Gail valley (in southwestern Carinthia) and through the southern part of East Tyrol. Its western group called "Lienz Dolomites" (Lienzer Dolomiten), is sometimes counted as part of this range and sometimes seen as separate.

== Name ==
The mountain range was described as the Gailthal Alps (Gailthaler Alpen) with its present-day extent as early as 1845 by Adolf Schaubach in his standard work, Die Deutschen Alpen. The name Lienz Dolomites (Lienzer Dolomiten) for the part west of the Gailberg Saddle is more recent and was introduced in 1885 by the Lienz branch of the German and Austrian Alpine Club but quickly caught on.

== Classification ==
According to the Alpine Club classification of the Eastern Alps (AVE) the Gailtal Alps (No. 56) are subdivided into the Drauzug proper and Lienz Dolomites subgroups, while in common parlance the umbrella term Drauzug conversely applies to the whole Limestone Alps range between the Drava and Gail rivers, including the Gailtal Alps and the Lienz Dolomites. In traditional geography according to Eduard Suess and Leopold Kober, Drauzug or Drau-Save-Zug denoted all Southern Limestone Alps ranges stretching along the Drava River, from the Lienz Dolomites in the west to the Karawanks in the east.

Located south of the broad Drava Valley, the Gailtal Alps orographically count as part of the Southern Limestone Alps. However, they rise north of the Periadriatic Seam and therefore geologically do not rank among the Southern Alps ranges. In regard to their orogenesis, they represent the remnants of the limestone nappes which had been moved northwards across the Central Eastern Alps to form the Northern Limestone Alps.

Despite their name, the Lienz Dolomites are not made up of dolomite, though the steep rugged karst topography resembles the South Alpine Dolomite rock formations. The northern Latschur group with Mt. Goldeck near Spittal an der Drau does not consist of limestone rocks, but is a crystalline basement massif.

== Geography ==
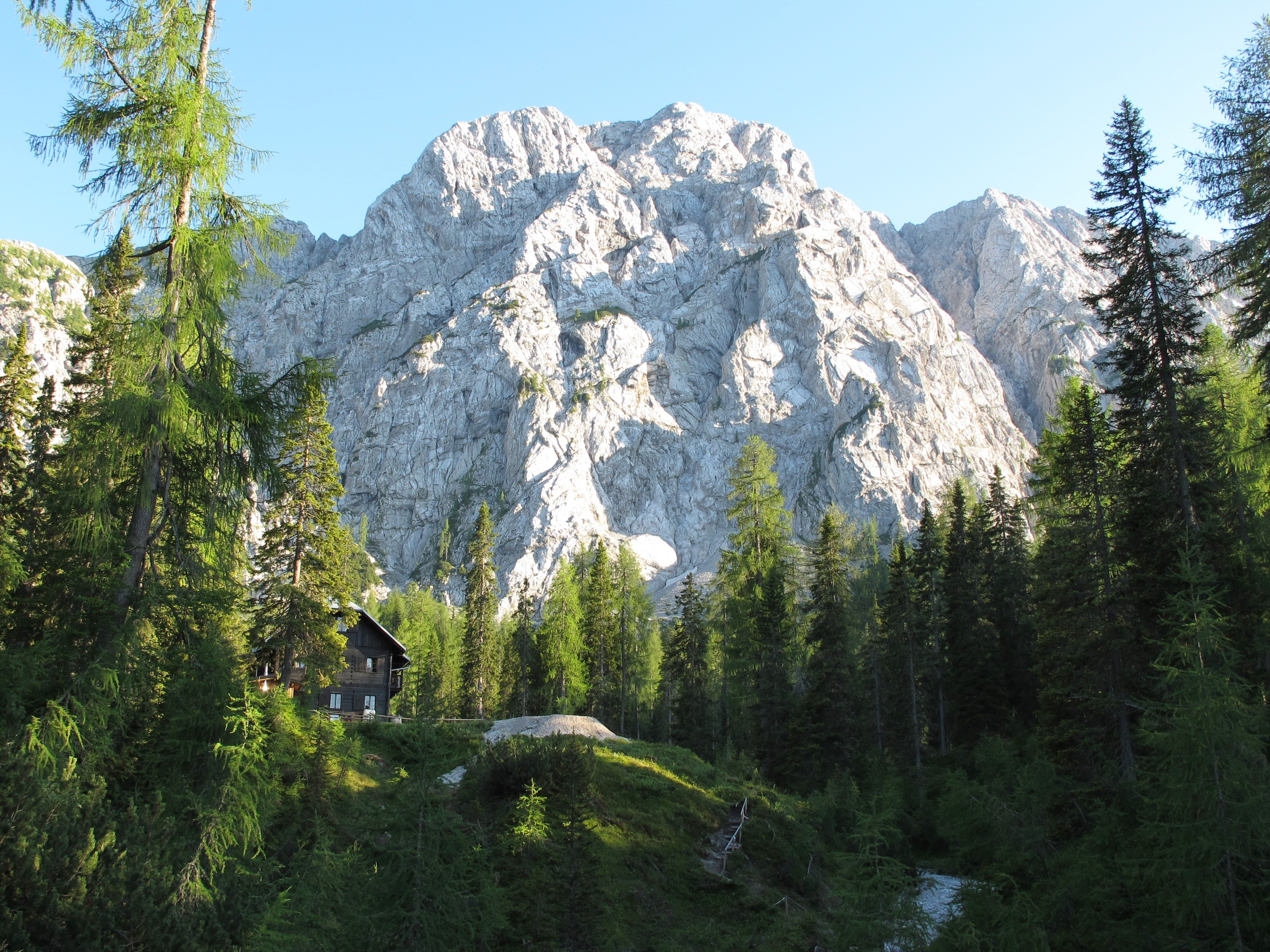
Mt Reißkofel

The 100 km long range, which narrows in the west, stretches between the Gail in the south and the Drava in the north. In a trough between the Gailtal Alps and the Goldeck lies the Weißensee at 930 metres (3,050 ft), the highest lake for bathing in Austria. The Drava range is divided in a west-east direction into five ridges separated by transverse valleys and a longitudinal valley.

=== Neighbouring ranges ===
Based on the AVE classification, the adjacent ranges are:

- To the north: Ankogel Group, Kreuzeck Group and Schober Group of the Hohe Tauern, part of the Central Eastern Alps
- To the northwest: Villgraten Mountains, part of the Hohe Tauern
- To the south: Carnic Alps and Karawanks, part of the Southern Limestone Alps
- To the east: Gurktal Alps, part of the Central Eastern Alps

=== Subdivisions ===
The Gailtal Alps can be divided into five massifs in east–west direction, separated by draws and the Weissensee longitudinal valley:

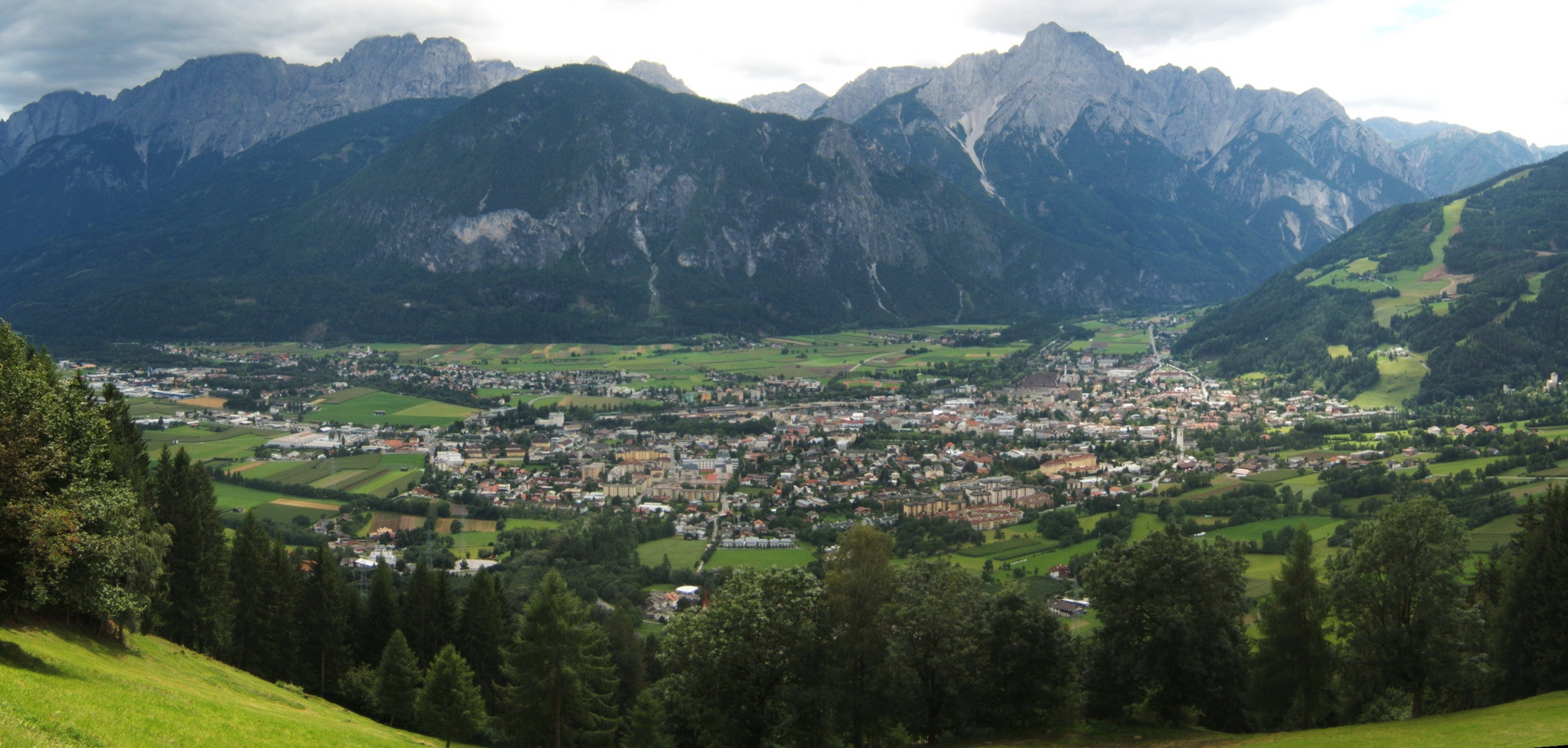
Lienz Dolomites and Lienz

- Lienz Dolomites, stretching about 40 km (25 mi) from the Kartitsch Saddle mountain pass (east of Sillian) to Gailberg Saddle near Oberdrauburg (highest summits: Große Sandspitze, 2,770 m (9,090 ft), Spitzkofel, 2,718 m (8,917 ft), both south of Lienz, Gamswiesenspitze, 2,486 m (8,156 ft), and Lumkofel, 2,287 m (7,503 ft))
- Drauzug or Gailtal Alps proper, stretching about 65 km (40 mi) from the Gailberg Saddle to the confluence of Drava and Gail near Villach:
  - Reißkofel Group, between Gailberg and the Kreuzberg Saddle south of Greifenburg (Reißkofel, 2,371 m (7,779 ft), The Jauken massif, 2,275 m (7,464 ft) with the highest peak Torkofel, the Spitzkofel, 2,223 m (7,293 ft), and Sattelnock, 2,033 m (6,670 ft))
  - Latschur Group, between Weissensee and the Drava bend near Sachsenburg (Latschur, 2,236 m (7,336 ft))
  - The Spitzegel Group, southeast of the Weißensee between Kreuzberg Saddle and the Bleiberg Graben (Spitzegel, 2,119 m (6,952 ft))
  - Dobratsch or Villach Alp, 2,166 m (7,106 ft), the easternmost foothills of the Gailtal Alps with the Schütt nature reserve.

== Literature ==
- Hubert Peterka, Willi End: Alpenvereinsführer Lienzer Dolomiten, Bergverlag Rother. Munich, 1984, ISBN 3-7633-1243-9
