= Gailberg Saddle =

Mountain pass in Austria connecting Oberdrauburg and Kötschach-Mauthen

Gailberg Saddle (Gailbergsattel)
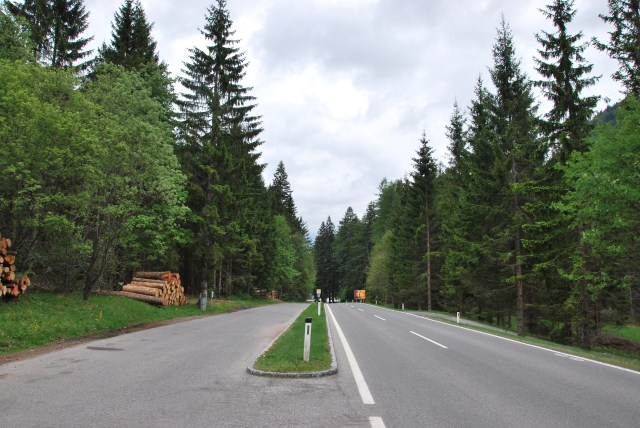
- Pass summit

- Location within Alps
- Elevation: 981 metres (3,219 ft)
- Traversed by: B 110

Third Approach
- Location: Austria
- Range: Alps
- Coordinates: 46°42′50″N 12°58′05″E

The Gailberg Saddle (el. 981 metres [3,219 ft]) is a high mountain pass in the Austrian Alps in the Bundesland of Kärnten (or Carinthia).

It connects Oberdrauburg in the north with Kötschach-Mauthen in the south. It leads to the Dolomites in the south.

Its name, "Gailberg", derives from the German word "Gail," which is in reference of the Gail River, and "Berg," meaning mountain or hill (compound noun). Gailbergsattel (also German) is a closely related term one might find in local cartography. It is also an important passage in relation to trade and military, and is chiefly recognized today for the "Gailberg Pass" road used by cyclists and motorists.

== See also ==
- List of highest paved roads in Europe
- List of mountain passes
