= Weissensee (Carinthia) =

Lake in Carinthia, Austria

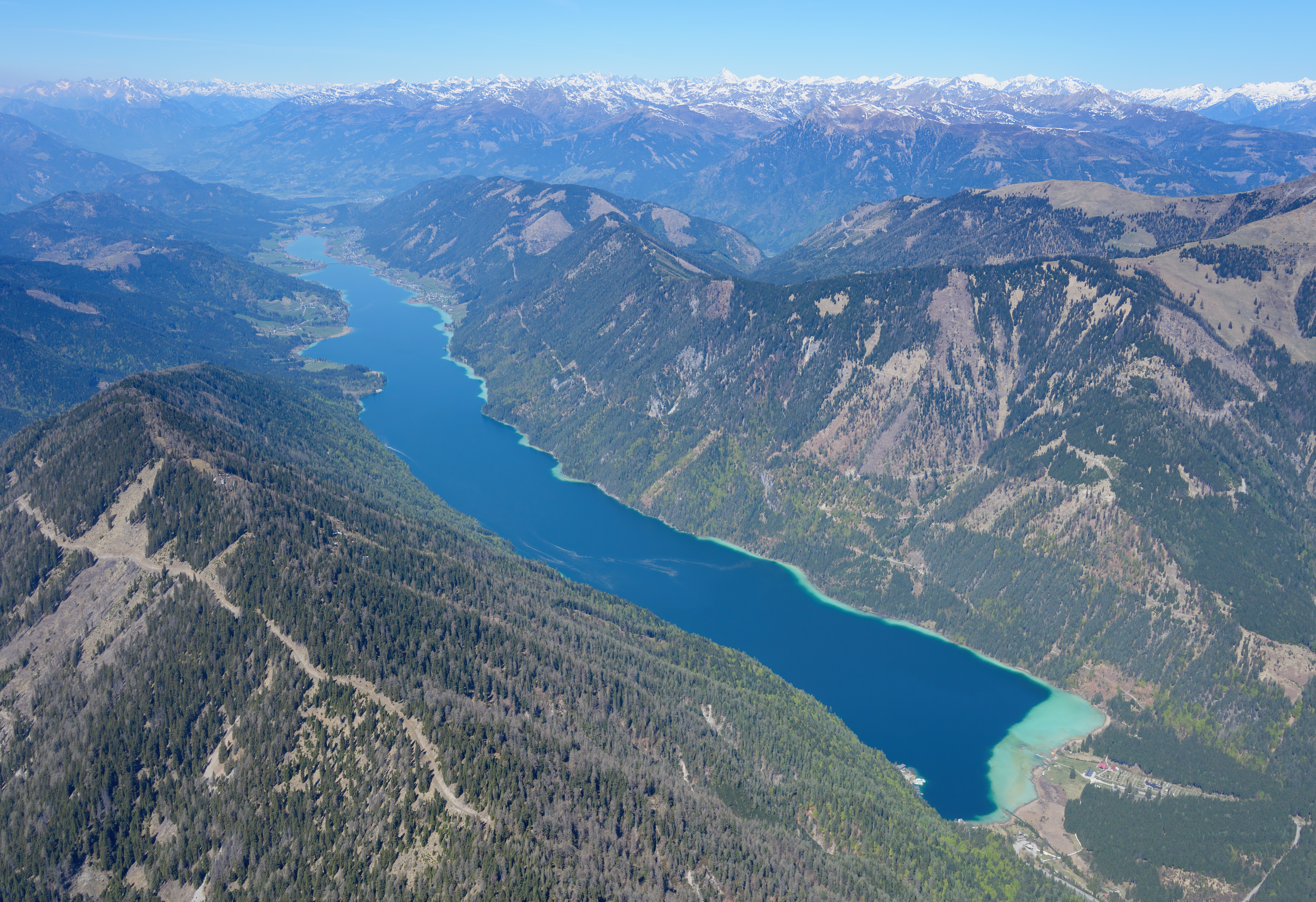
- Weissensee aerial view

- Location within Austria

- Location: Carinthia
- Coordinates: 46°42′24″N 13°20′28″E
- Type: glacial lake
- Primary outflows: Weissenbach to Drava River
- Basin countries: Austria
- Max. length: 11.6 km (7.2 mi)
- Max. width: 0.9 km (0.56 mi)
- Surface area: 6.5 km^{2} (2.5 sq mi)
- Max. depth: 97 m (318 ft)
- Residence time: 9.2 years
- Surface elevation: 930 m (3,050 ft)
- Settlements: Techendorf, Neusach, Gatschach, Oberdorf, Naggl

The Weissensee (German spelling: Weißensee [ˈvaɪsn̩ˌzeː], lit. 'white lake') is a lake in the Austrian state of Carinthia within the Gailtal Alps mountain range. The highest situated Carinthian bathing lake shares its name with the municipality of Weissensee on the northern and southern shore.

== Geography ==
The western shore of the glacial lake is located near the Kreuzberg Saddle mountain pass of the Bundesstraße road from Greifenburg to Hermagor. A smaller mountain road runs from the Drava valley via Stockenboi to the eastern end. Despite its elevation of 930 mAA (3051 ft), the lake surface can reach 24 degrees Celsius in the summer months, while in winter the water freezes over completely and allows skaters to move freely on the ice.

Due to its steep shore, the eastern part is almost uninhabited, with only a narrow path leading to the eastern end, where the area of the Stockenboi municipality reaches the lake. Here the Weißenbach creek runs down to the Drava Valley. Along the shore are banks of chalk originating from the surrounding mountains of the Southern Limestone Alps, which give the waters its characteristic colour and the Weissensee ("White Lake") its name.

About two thirds of the lake's surface are part of a protected area. Ship transport on the lake is provided by four vessels and a speed boat. Except for public transport, the operation of motor boats is prohibited. The waters of the lake reach drinking water quality. The area has much wildlife. It contains many different types of fish, especially trout, common carp, perch and northern pike. Also, there are many different birds, ranging from ducks to geese and herons.

== Population ==
According to a 2001 survey, the Weissensee district had 788 inhabitants of which 97.2% had Austrian citizenship. 73.6% of those surveyed claimed to be members of the evangelical church, 22% claimed to be members of the Roman-Catholic church, and 1% were of Islamic faith. 3.4% claimed not to belong to a religious denomination.

== Activities ==
Since 1989, in winter the lake is the site of the Dutch Alternatieve Elfstedentocht speed skating competition. Beside skating, ice stock sport and cross-country skiing around the Weissensee is quite popular. A smaller alpine skiing area is situated at the southern shore. In February 2007 the first underwater ice hockey world championship was held at the lake. In January 2011, an Austrian mountain aviator association landed about 30 small aircraft on the frozen surface.

A prominent mountain spur at the northern shore, Ronacherfels, is named after a local peasant who died in the winter of 1916 while steering a sleigh on the frozen lake. Taking a shortcut home, he sledged over a thin patch of ice, fell through and died. His body was never found. In honour of his memory, the spur and a nearby inn were named after him.

Parts of the 1987 James Bond film The Living Daylights were shot at frozen Weissensee.

== Gallery ==
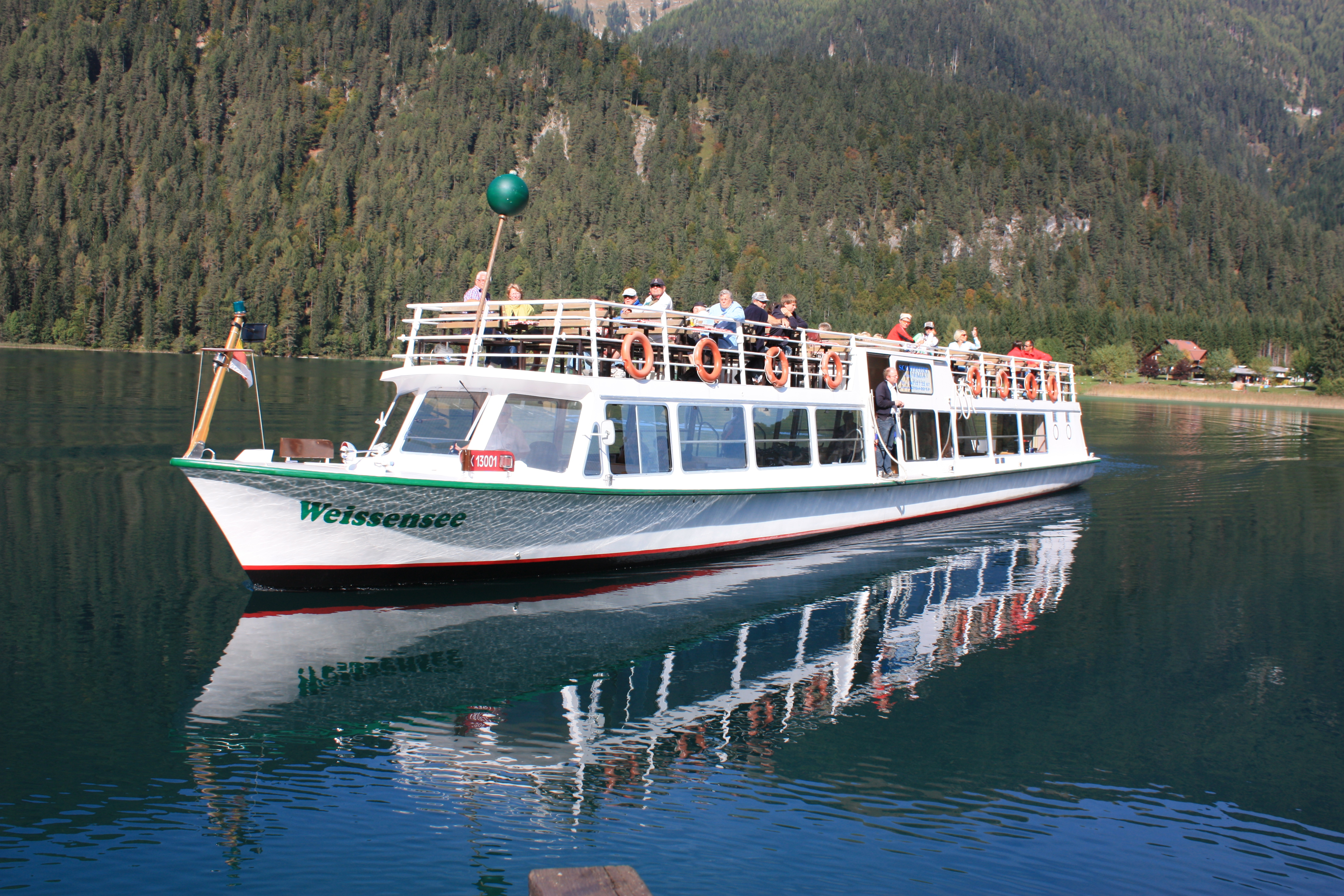
Passenger ship

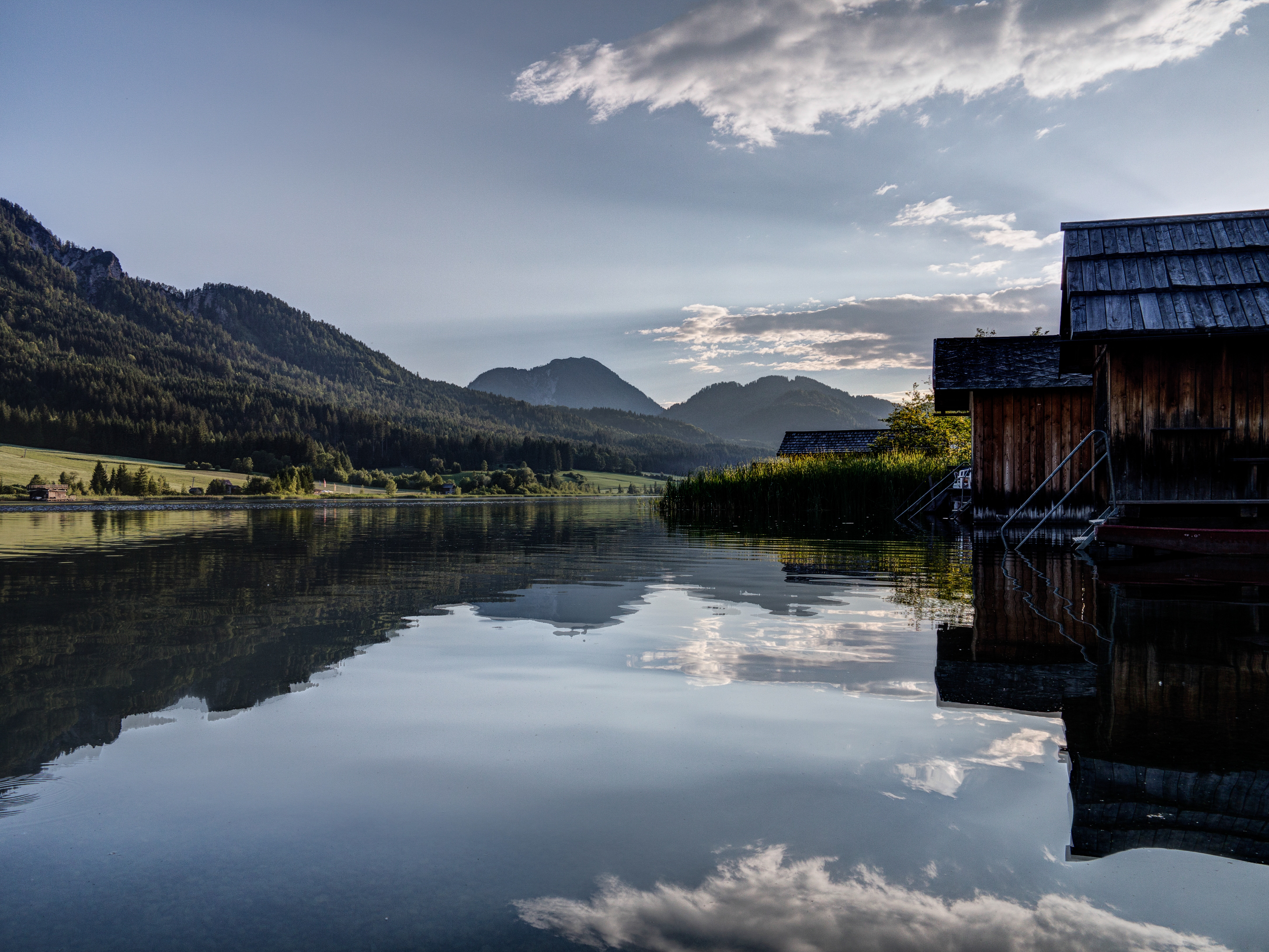
Western shore at Techendorf

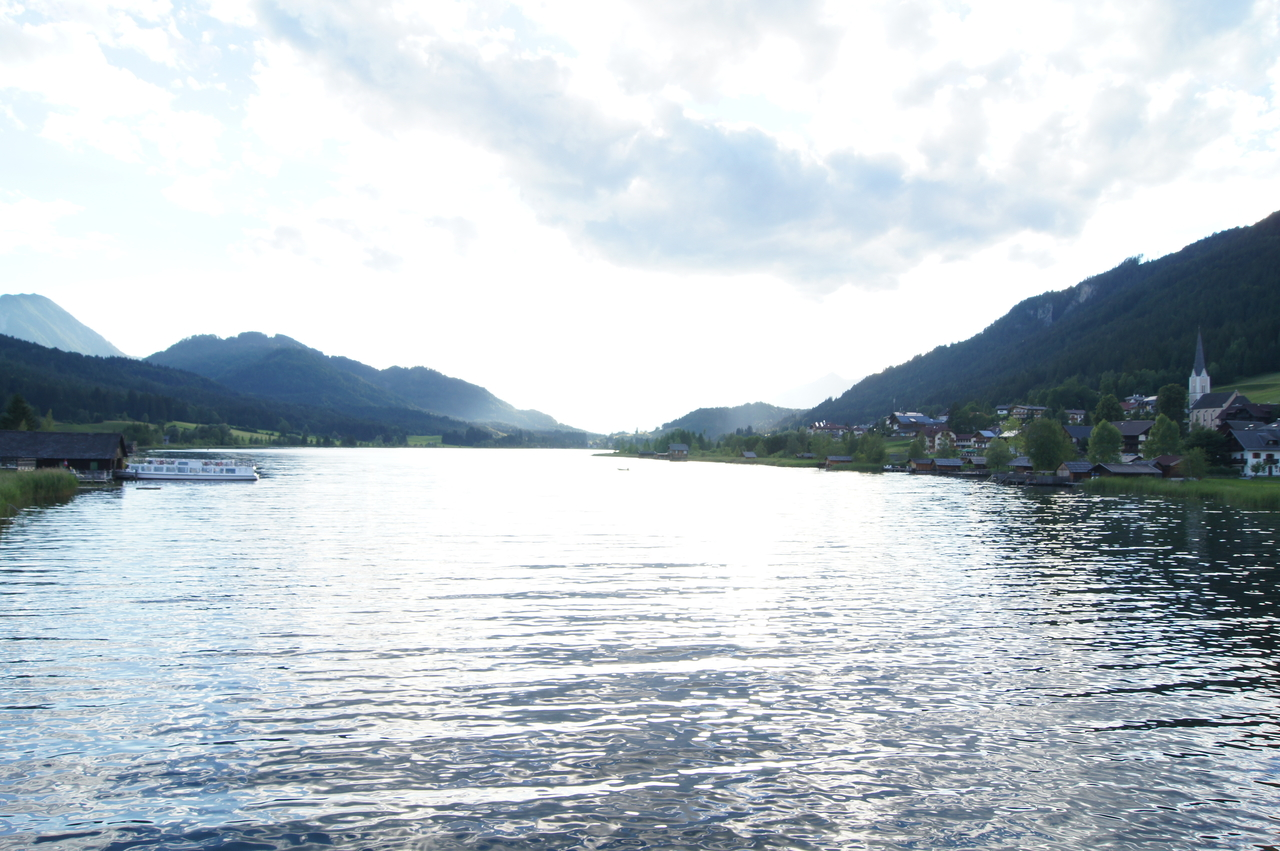
Weissensee western view from Techendorf bridge

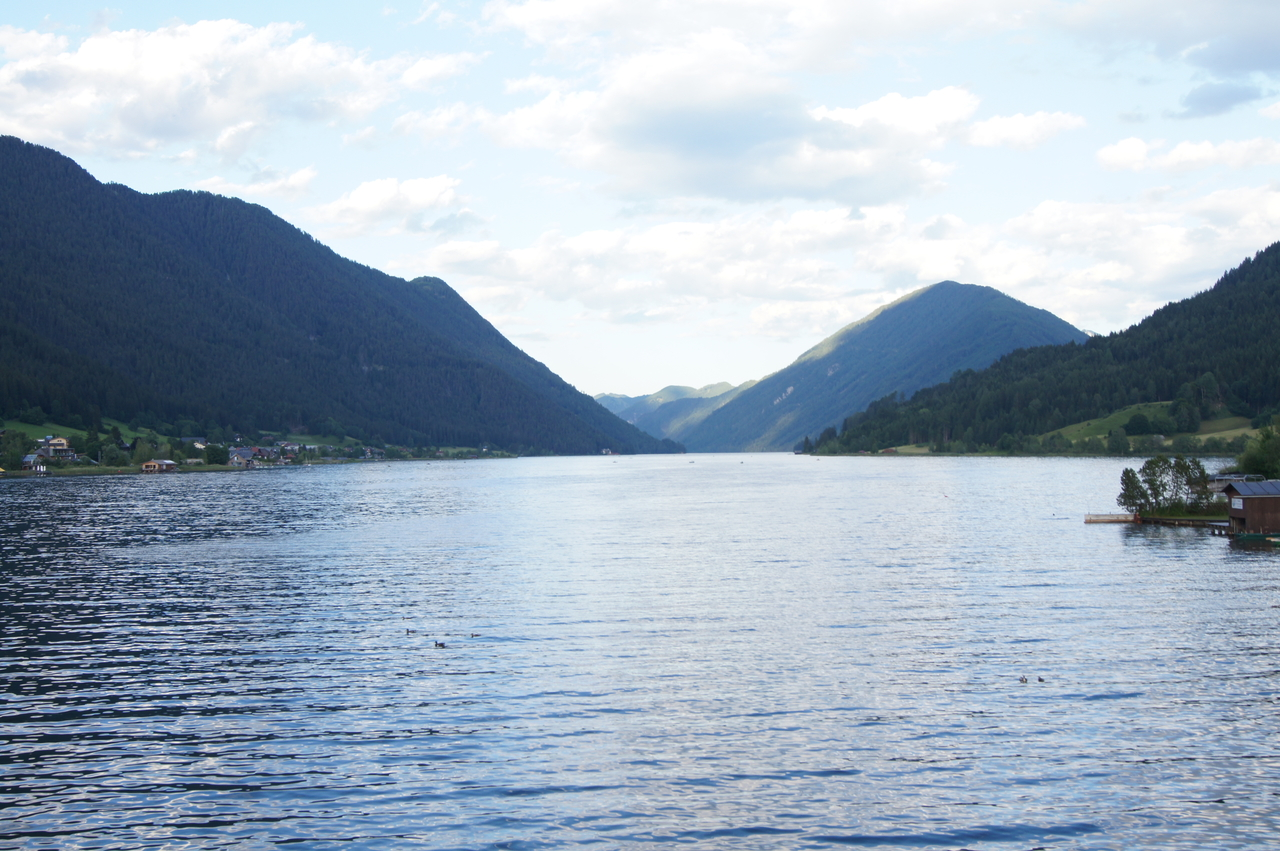
Weissensee eastern view from Techendorf bridge

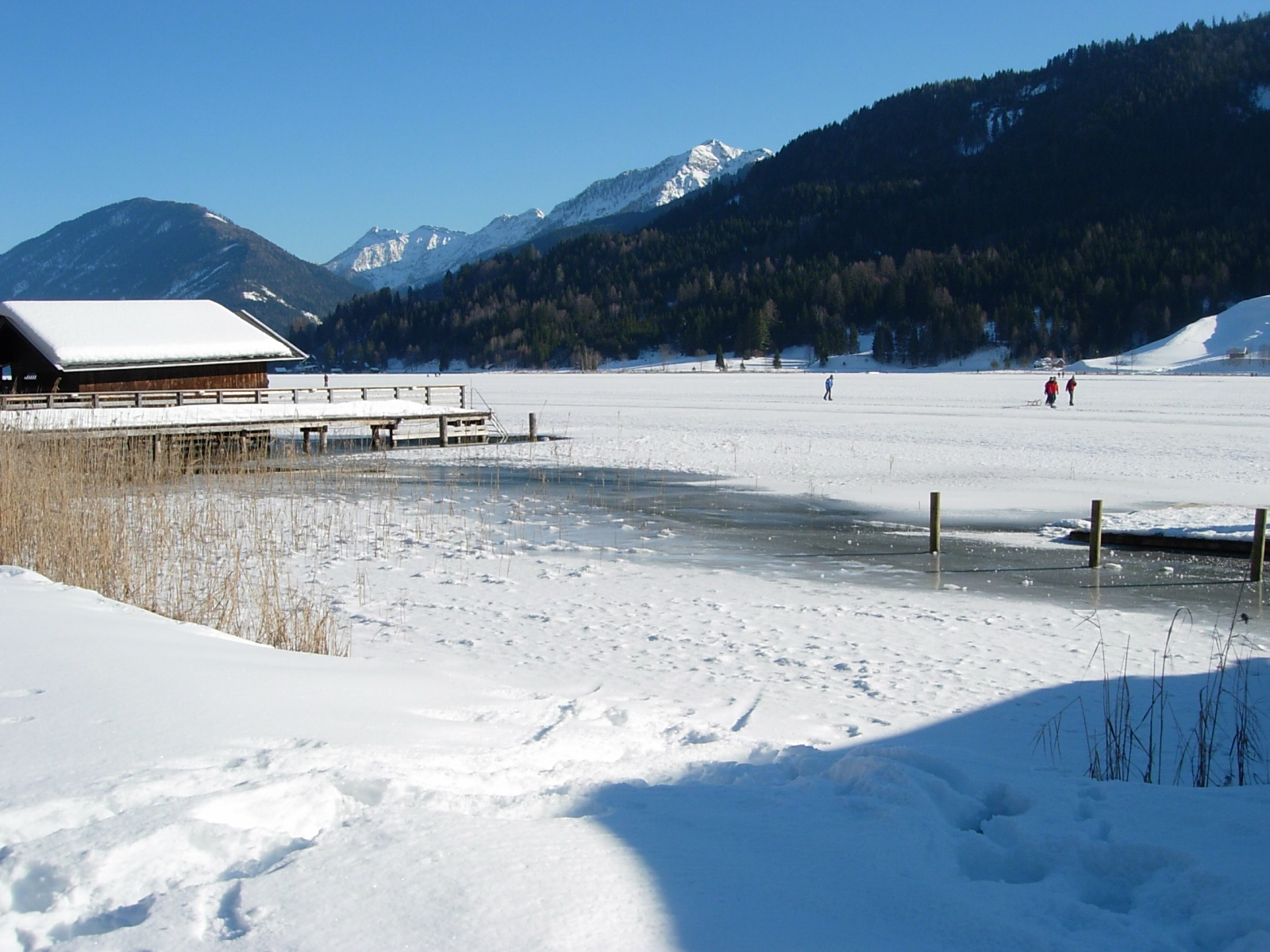
Weissensee in winter

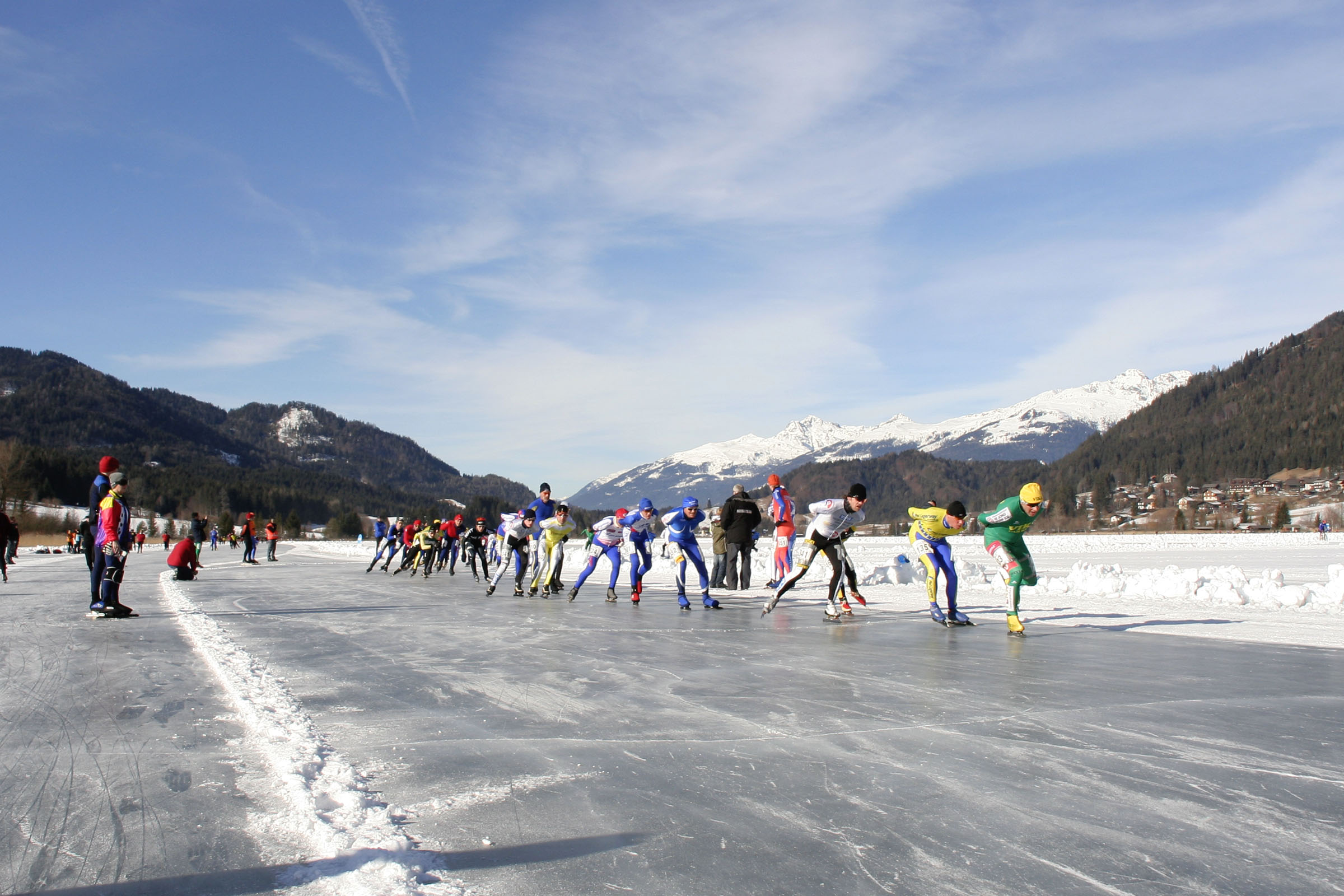
Skaters

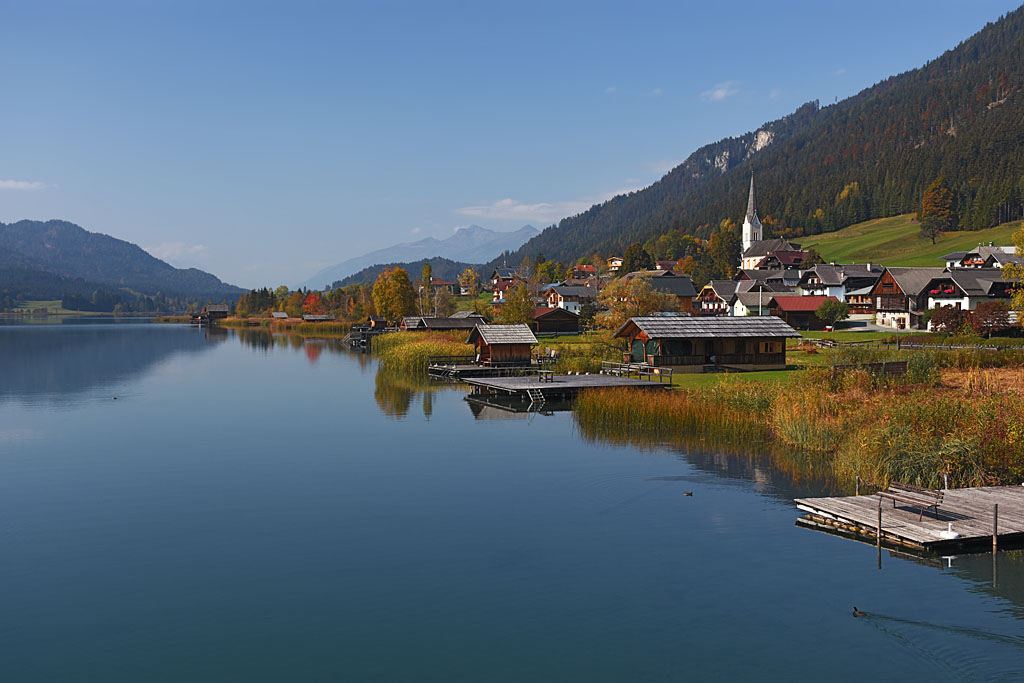
Techendorf at Weissensee

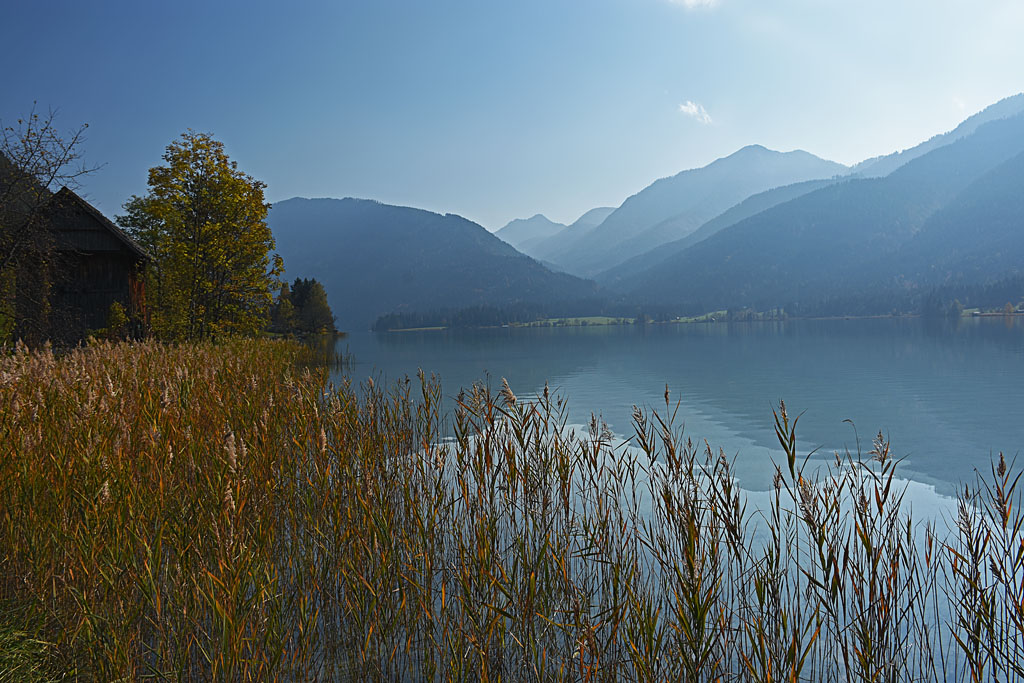
Weissensee, northern shore
