= Greifenburg =

- Municipality
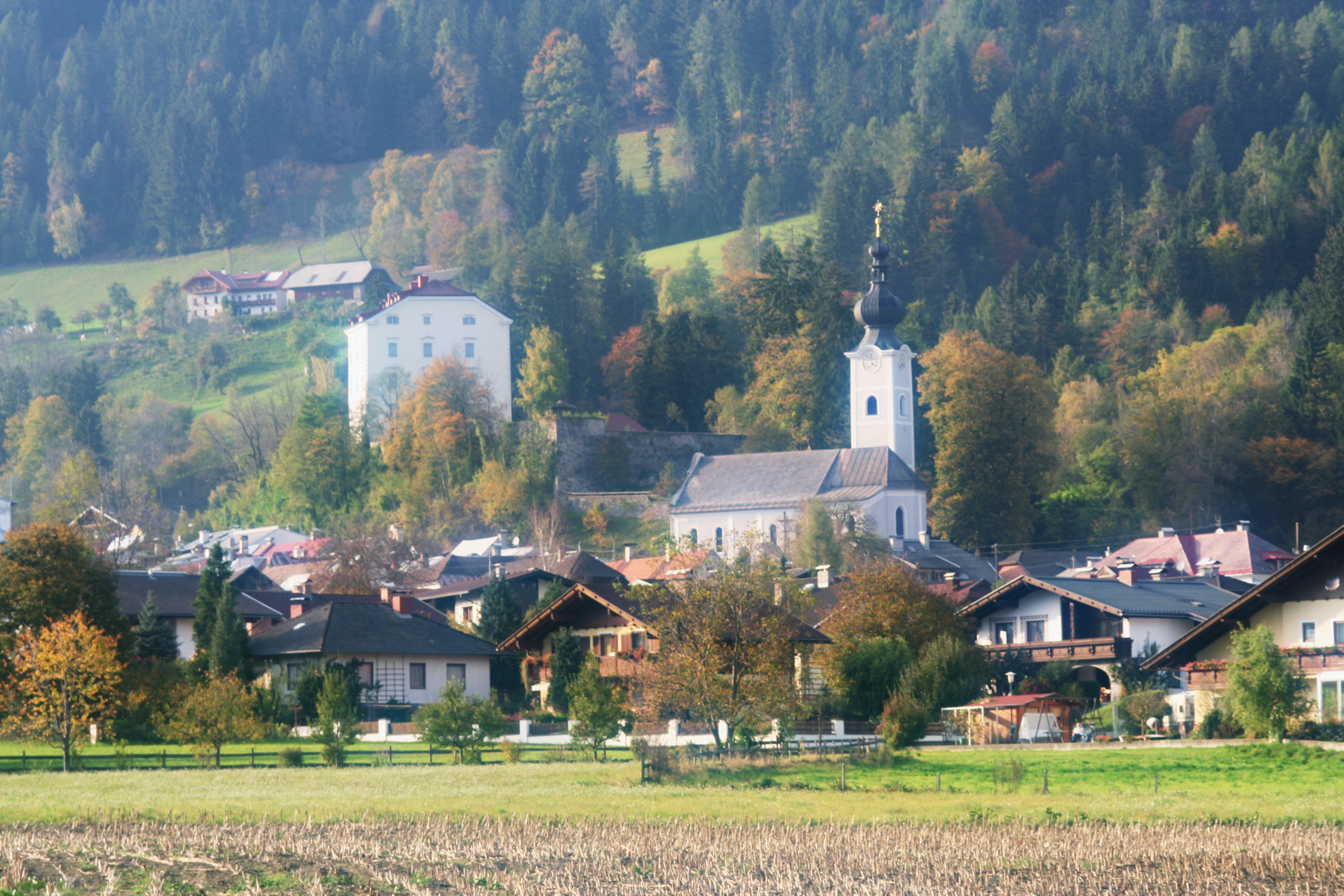

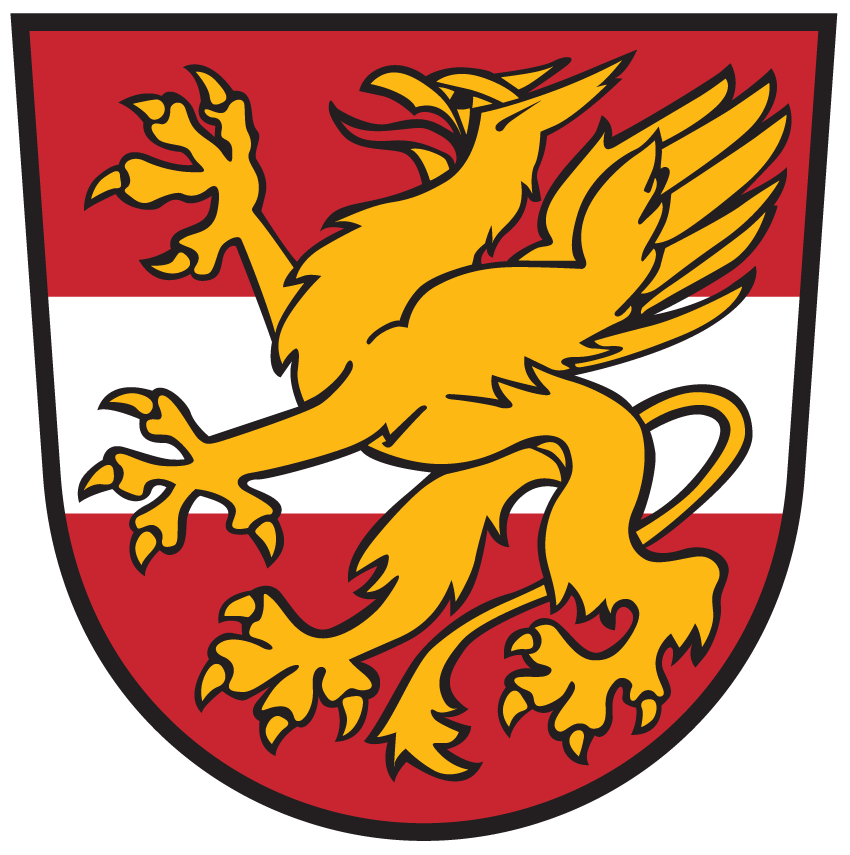
- Coat of arms

- Location within Austria
- Coordinates: 46°45′N 13°11′E
- Country: Austria
- State: Carinthia
- District: Spittal an der Drau

Government
  - Mayor: Josef Brandner (ÖVP)

Area
  - Total: 76.28 km^{2} (29.45 sq mi)
- Elevation: 644 m (2,113 ft)

Population (2018-01-01)
  - Total: 1,736
  - Density: 22.76/km^{2} (58.94/sq mi)
- Time zone: UTC+1 (CET)
  - Summer (DST): UTC+2 (CEST)
- Postal code: 9761
- Area code: 04712
- Website: www.greifenburg.com

Greifenburg is a market town in the district of Spittal an der Drau in the Austrian state of Carinthia.

== Geography ==
The settlement stretches in the upper Drava Valley (Drautal) between the Kreuzeck mountain range in the north, part of the High Tauern, and the Gailtal Alps in the south. From Greifenburg, a mountain road leads southwards up to the Weissensee lake and Kreuzberg Saddle pass.

The municipal area comprises the cadastral communities of Bruggen, Greifenburg proper, and Kerschbaum.

== History ==
The present-day settlement may have arisen from a mansio called Bilachium on the Roman road from Sanctium (Villach) along the Drava River up to Littamum (Innichen), at the strategically important branch-off to Kreuzberg Pass.

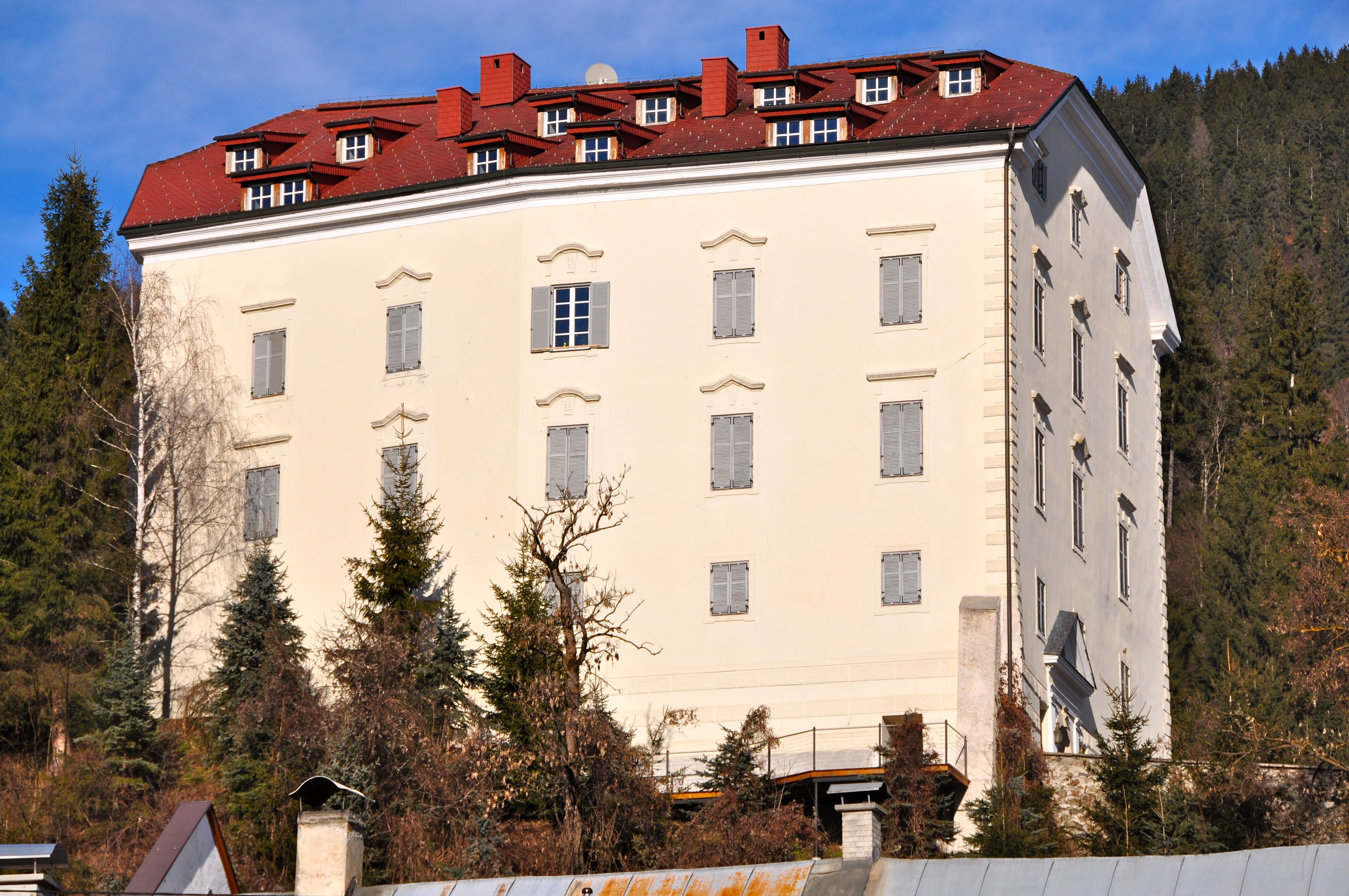
Greifenburg Castle

Greifenburg Castle was first mentioned in an 1166 deed, then located within the lands held by the House of Gorizia (Meinhardiner); it was acquired by the Carinthian duke Bernhard von Spanheim about 1230. Duke Bernhard maintained Greifenburg, defeating the united troops of Count Meinhard I of Görz and his father-in-law Count Albert IV of Tyrol with the support from his son Archbishop Philip of Salzburg in 1252. Vested with market rights in 1267, Greifenburg nevertheless fell to the Meinhardiner dynasty, when upon the extinction of the Sponheim dynasty the Habsburg king Rudolph I of Germany enfeoffed Count Meinhard's son, Meinhard II, with the Carinthian duchy in 1286. Duke Meinhard II died at Greifenburg Castle in 1295.

Upon the death of Meinhard's heir Duke Henry in 1335, Greifenburg, with the Carinthian lands, passed to the Austrian House of Habsburg in 1335. In 1460, Count John II of Görz officially relinquished all claims to the town in favour of Emperor Frederick III. In 1537 the Habsburgs enfeoffed their treasurer Count Gabriel von Salamanca-Ortenburg with the estates; his heirs held Greifenburg Castle until 1626.

== Politics ==
Seats in the municipal assembly (Gemeinderat) as of 2015 local elections:

- Austrian People's Party (ÖVP): 7
- Social Democratic Party of Austria (SPÖ): 4
- Freedom Party of Austria (FPÖ): 4

=== Twin towns — sister cities ===
Greifenburg is twinned with:

- Schiffweiler, Germany

== Notable people ==
- Baldur Preiml (born 1939), ski jumper.
