= Bad Kleinkirchheim =

- Municipality
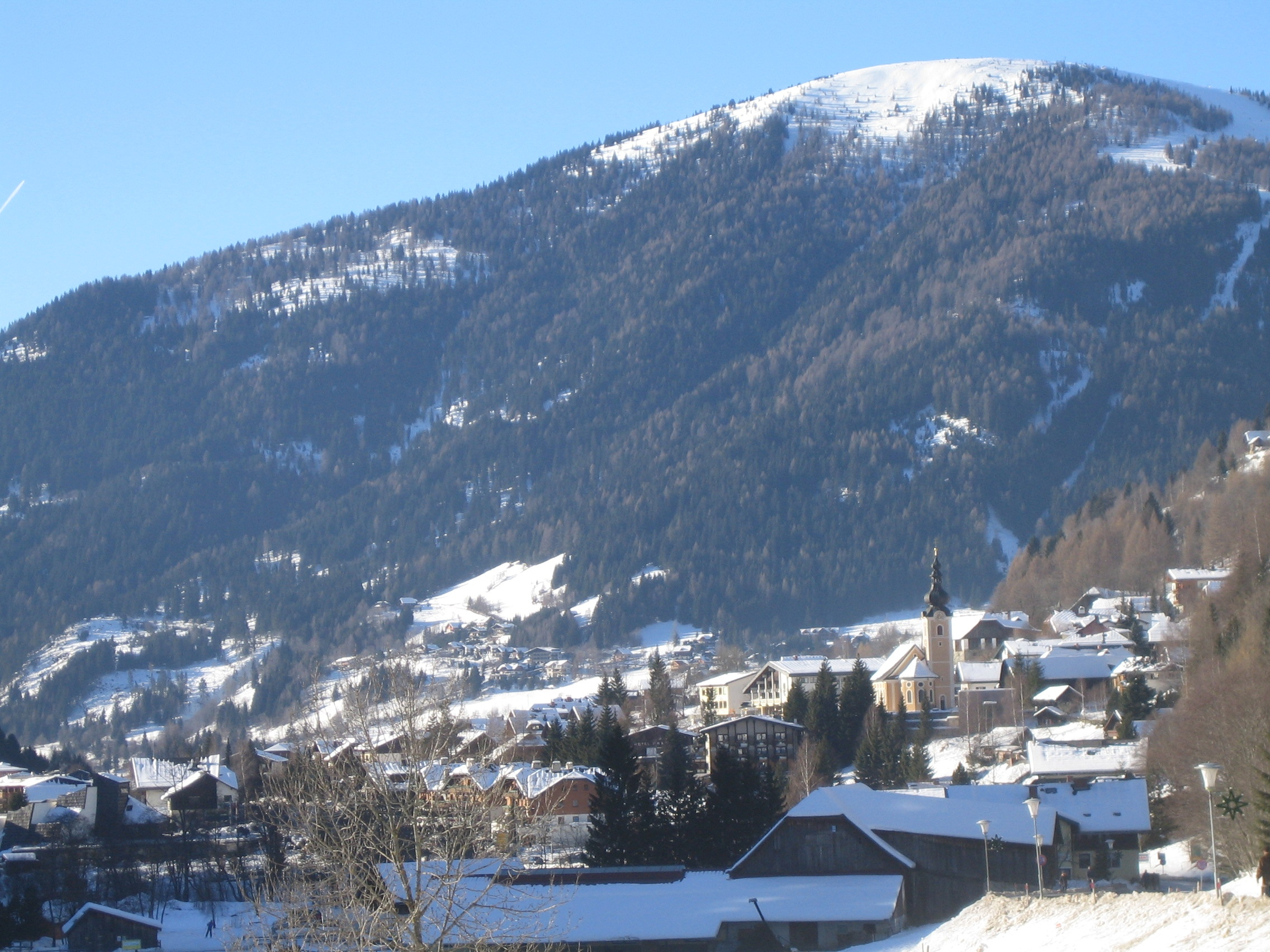
- Bad Kleinkirchheim in December 2005

- Coat of arms

- Location within Austria
- Coordinates: 46°48′47.48″N 13°47′33.86″E
- Country: Austria
- State: Carinthia
- District: Spittal an der Drau

Government
  - Mayor: Matthias Krenn (Independent)

Area
  - Total: 74.05 km^{2} (28.59 sq mi)
- Elevation: 1,087 m (3,566 ft)

Population (2018-01-01)
  - Total: 1,723
  - Density: 23.27/km^{2} (60.26/sq mi)
- Time zone: UTC+1 (CET)
  - Summer (DST): UTC+2 (CEST)
- Postal code: 9546
- Area code: 04240
- Vehicle registration: SP
- Website: bad-kleinkirchheim.gv.at

Bad Kleinkirchheim is a municipality and spa town in the district of Spittal an der Drau, in Carinthia, Austria.

Until the middle of the 20th century, agriculture was the dominant focus, but it is now a renowned spa and ski resort. Although records show people appreciating the area as a recreation area as early as the 11th century, and the first bathing guests arriving in the 17th century, it was only in the last few decades that Bad Kleinkirchheim began to move away from agriculture and focus on its potential for tourism.

== Geography ==
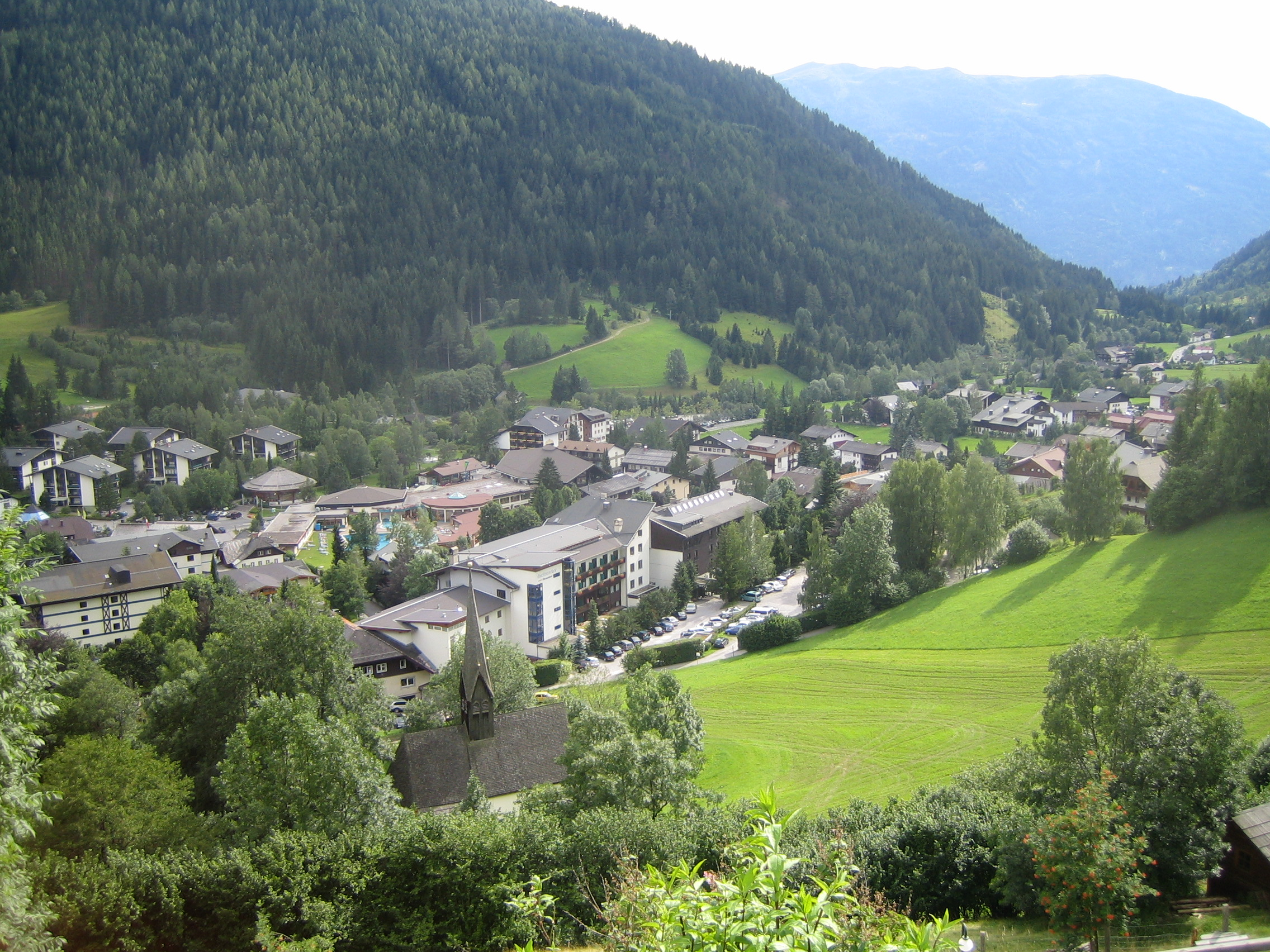
Kleinkircheim Valley

Bad Kleinkirchheim is at an average elevation of 1,087 m (3,566 ft) in a 5 km (3 mi) stretch of a glacial trough valley in the Gurktal Alps (Nock Mountains), between the Millstätter See and the upper Gurk River. The populated section lies between 980 m (3,215 ft) and 1,380 m (4,528 ft), and the highest point in the area is the peak of the Klomnock, at 2,331 m (7,648 ft). North of Kleinkirchheim and St. Oswald, part of the Nockberge National Park is within the area’s boundaries.

To the north and south of the valley, the hills rise relatively steeply to an elevation of about 2,000 m (6,600 ft), so that the only way in and out is by the B88 road which links the area to Radenthein in the west and Reichenau in the east. Bad Kleinkirchheim also borders Krems in the northwest and Feld am See to the southwest.

=== Municipal subdivisions ===
Bad Kleinkirchheim can be divided into 3 catastral municipalities (Katastralgemeinden): (Population as of 2025)

- Kleinkirchheim (945)
- St. Oswald (306)
- Zirkitzen (406)

Alternatively, Bad Kleinkirchheim can also be divided into 9 localities (Ortschaften): (Population as of 2025)

- Aigen (41)
- Bach (267)
- Kleinkirchheim (372)
- Obertschern (131)
- Rottenstein (66)
- St. Oswald (151)
- Staudach (160)
- Untertschern (136)
- Zirkitzen (333)

== History ==
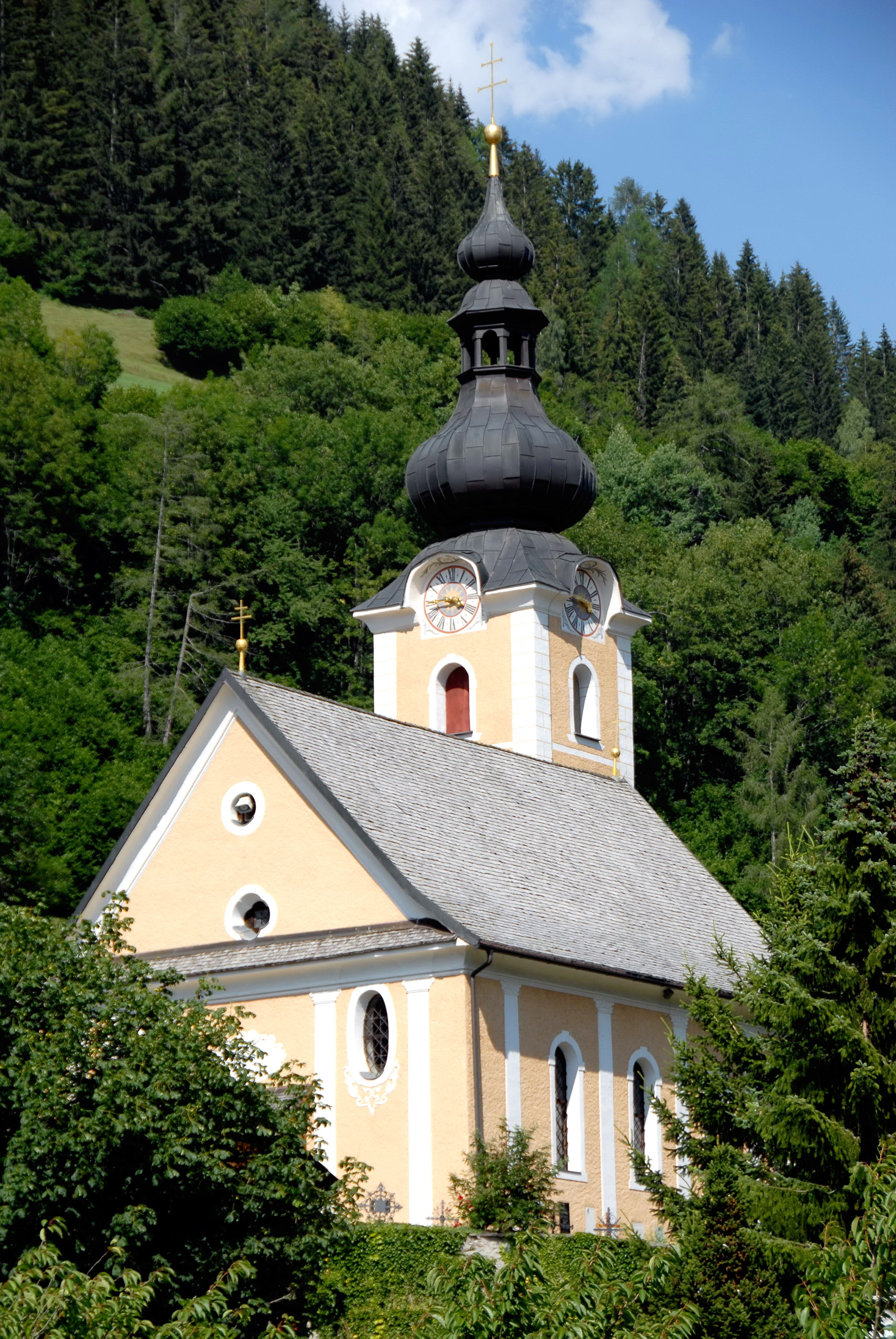
St Ulrich parish church

The remote and densely forested valley apparently was not settled in Roman times, when the area became part of the Noricum province in 15 BC. From about 600, Alpine Slavs migrated up the Drava and its tributary valleys, followed by Bavarian settlers from the mid 8th century onwards. In the early 9th century, the region passed under Carolingian suzerainty. Part of the Imperial Duchy of Carinthia from 976, the Kleinkirchheim estates were held by the Bavarian Aribonid dynasty.

In a document dated 5 July 1166, in which Archbishop Conrad II of Salzburg confirms the donation of a chapel in the area to nearby Millstatt Abbey, there is mention of Chirchem as well as of a priest called Pabo. This is considered the first mention of Bad Kleinkirchheim. The settlement is also mentioned in a 1177 deed issued by Pope Alexander III. The Benedictine monks had the forests cleared and the valley colonized by smallholder peasants. The settlement was later called Kleinkirchheim in order to distinguish it from Großkirchheim in the Carinthian Möll Valley.

In 1469 Millstatt Abbey was dissolved and its estates passed to the Knightly Order of Saint George, established by Emperor Frederick III to protect the area against the Ottoman forces who after the Fall of Constantinople already campaigned the Balkans and the Duchy of Carniola in the south. Turkish troops broke into the region in September 1473, robbing the town and plundering the valleys. On 25 June 1478 a group of about 600 farmers tried unsuccessfully to drive them out. By 1480 the Turks left, possibly as a result of an invasion by Hungarians under King Matthias Corvinus.

During the Protestant Reformation, many farmers in the area turned Lutheran and by the late 16th century freedom of religion had been bestowed on the residents. However, when the Habsburg archduke Ferdinand II rose to power, he ceded the Millstatt estates with Kleinkirchheim to the Jesuits and made Roman Catholicism the official religion. Nevertheless, Crypto-Protestants still managed to smuggle books and hold secret meetings during the Counter-Reformation, and according to the 1781 Patent of Toleration issued by Emperor Joseph II, a Protestant or a Jew would have nearly all the rights of a Catholic.

Bad Kleinkirchheim was shortly ruled within the French Illyrian Provinces during the Napoleonic Wars, but returned to the Austrian Empire in 1816. The Revolutions of 1848 also affected the area, as farmers (which then made up most of the town's population) got more rights.

Finally, in 1973, Bad Kleinkirchheim officially had the "Bad" (bath, spa) attached to its name, Kleinkirchheim, a reference to the popular hot spring.

== Demographics ==
Historical population
Year	Pop.	±%
1869	915	—
1880	968	+5.8%
1890	970	+0.2%
1900	968	−0.2%
1910	1,062	+9.7%
1923	944	−11.1%
1934	1,055	+11.8%
1939	1,043	−1.1%
1951	1,268	+21.6%
1961	1,352	+6.6%
1971	1,731	+28.0%
1981	1,783	+3.0%
1991	1,889	+5.9%
2001	1,863	−1.4%
2011	1,839	−1.3%
2021	1,678	−8.8%
2026	1,625	−3.2%

=== 2001 census results ===
93.4% of the inhabitants of Bad Kleinkirchheim are Austrian by nationality. The largest portion of the foreign population comes from South-East Europe (Yugoslavia 1.7%, Croatia 1.0%, Bosnia and Herzegovina 0.5%) as well as from Germany (1.4%). 95.2% of the population speak German, 1.8% Serbian and 1.0% Croatian. 62.3% of the population admit themselves to Roman Catholicism, 30.8% are Protestants and 2.0% Orthodox, 0.8% are Muslims, 3.5% are without religious confession.

== Politics ==
The municipal council (Gemeinderat) consists of 13 members. Following the 2021 Carinthian Local Elections, the seat distribution is as follows:

- Independent Bad Kleinkirchheim' List (BKK): 8 seats
- Austrian People's Party (ÖVP): 3 seats
- Social Democratic Party of Austria (SPÖ): 2 seats

The mayor of Bad Kleinkirchheim, Matthias Krenn (BKK), was re-elected in 2021.

== Infrastructure ==
=== Notable buildings ===
This town is most famous for its church, built circa 1492. There are also many farms and mills.

=== Sports ===
The town is known for its ski resorts, offering skiable slopes of 185 km, as well as 16 km of tracks for cross-country skiing. The Alpine Skiing World Cup is also held here often. The local ski club, the Ski Club Kleinkirchheim, was established in 1947 and has about 2,000 members, a population larger than the town itself.

Besides skiing, other less popular sports include football, golf, and tennis. The town also has a chess club.
