= Rangersdorf =

- Municipality
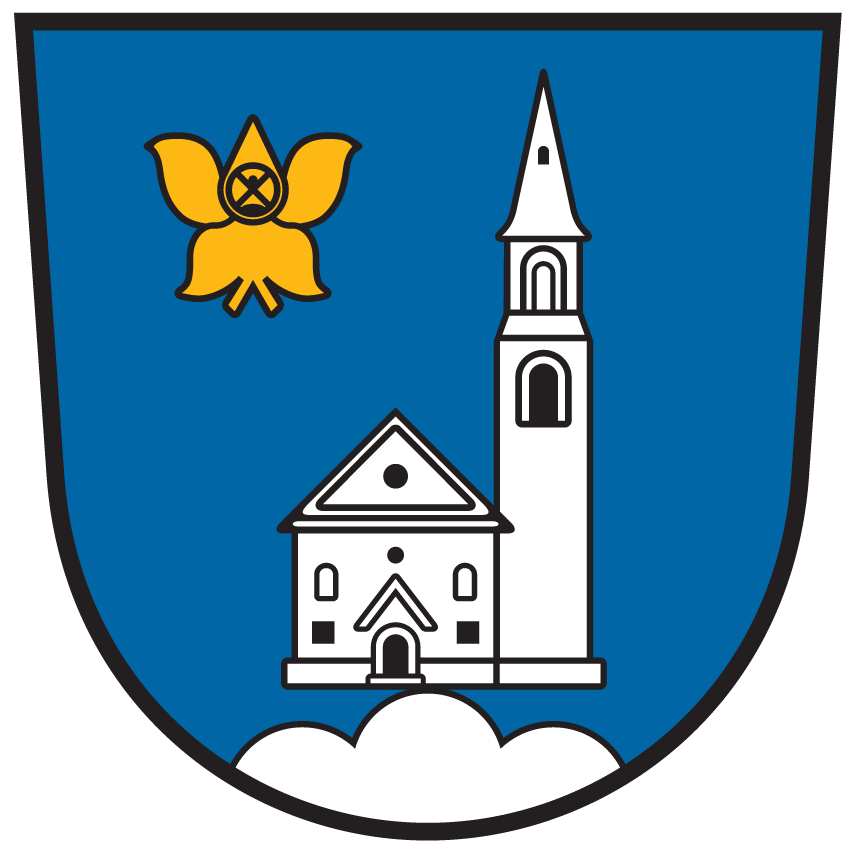
- Coat of arms

- Location within Austria
- Coordinates: 46°52′N 12°58′E
- Country: Austria
- State: Carinthia
- District: Spittal an der Drau

Government
  - Mayor: Franz Zlöbl

Area
  - Total: 84.27 km^{2} (32.54 sq mi)
- Elevation: 864 m (2,835 ft)

Population (2018-01-01)
  - Total: 1,736
  - Density: 20.60/km^{2} (53.35/sq mi)
- Time zone: UTC+1 (CET)
  - Summer (DST): UTC+2 (CEST)
- Postal code: 9833
- Area code: 04823
- Website: www.rangersdorf.at

Rangersdorf is a town in the district of Spittal an der Drau in Carinthia, Austria.

== Geography ==
Rangersdorf lies in the Möll valley (German: Mölltal) between the Goldberg Group of mountains to the north and the Kreuzeck Group to the south.

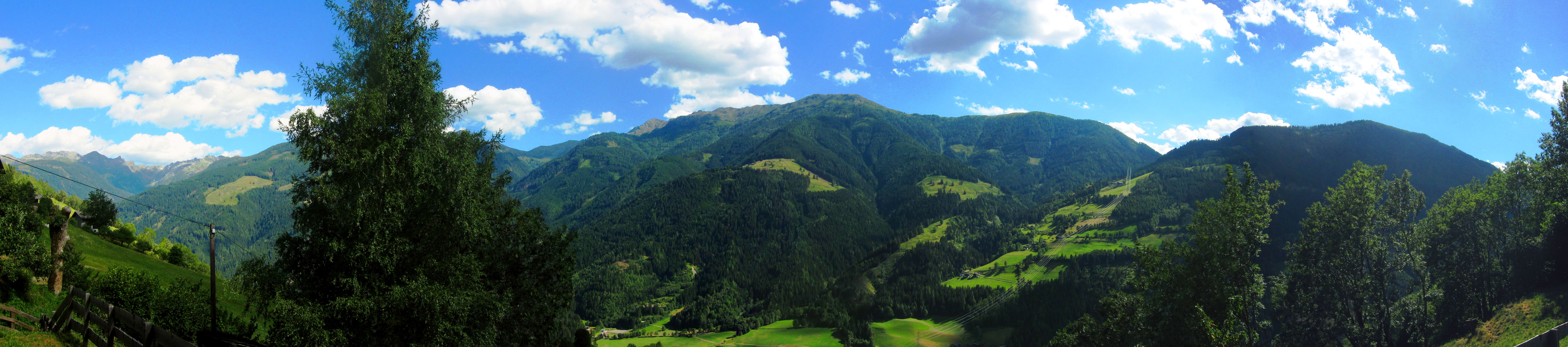
Looking across the Möll Valley from Rangersdorf
