= Berg im Drautal =

- Municipality
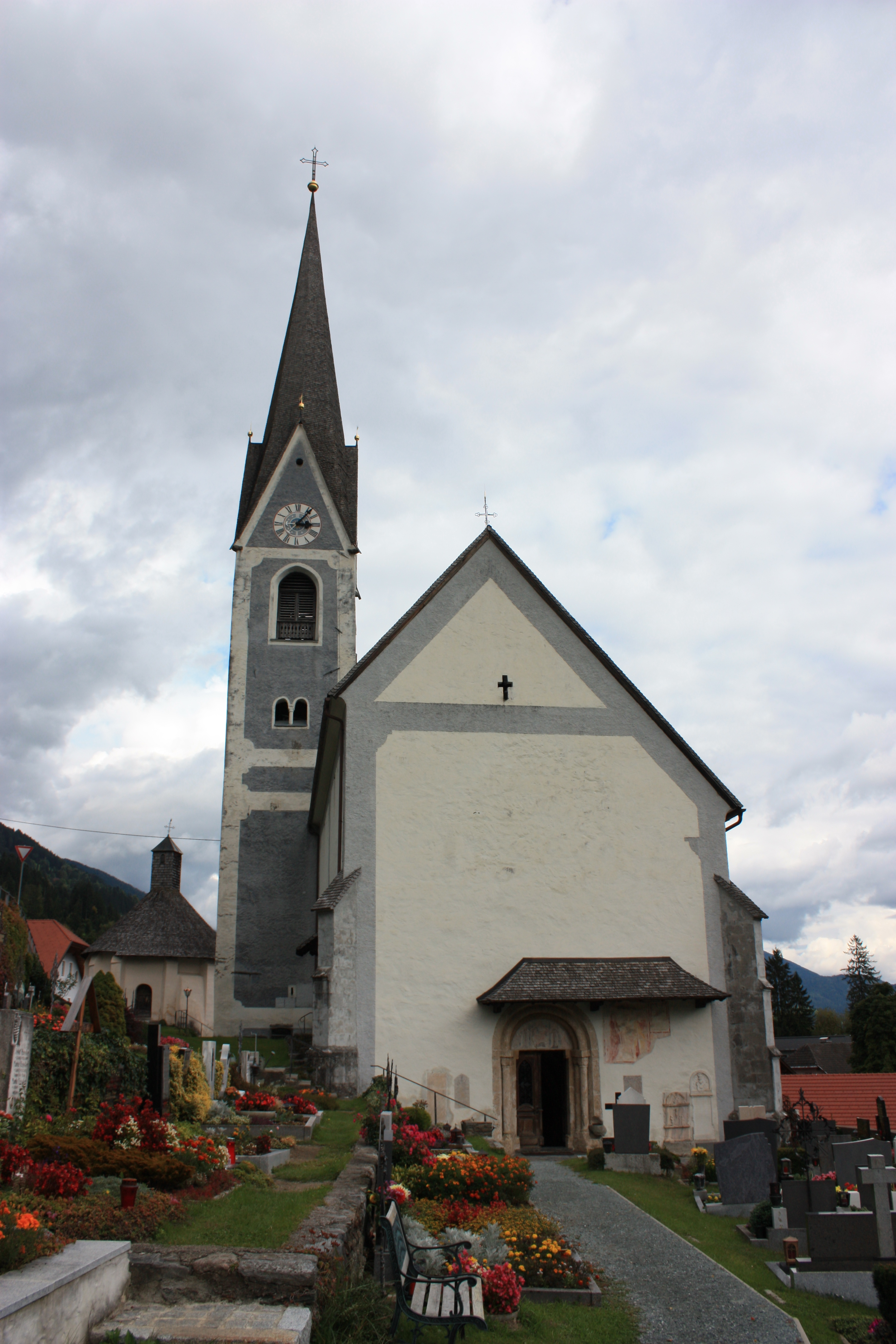

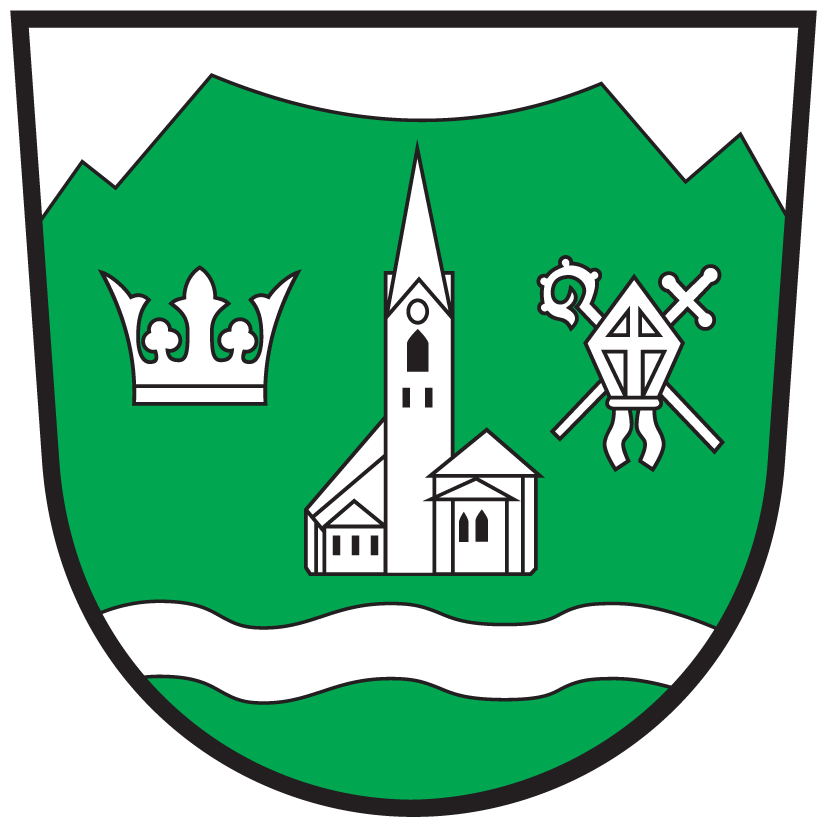
- Coat of arms

- Location within Austria
- Coordinates: 46°45′N 13°8′E
- Country: Austria
- State: Carinthia
- District: Spittal an der Drau

Government
  - Mayor: Ferdinand Hueter

Area
  - Total: 54.27 km^{2} (20.95 sq mi)
- Elevation: 692 m (2,270 ft)

Population (2018-01-01)
  - Total: 1,278
  - Density: 23.55/km^{2} (60.99/sq mi)
- Time zone: UTC+1 (CET)
  - Summer (DST): UTC+2 (CEST)
- Postal code: 9771
- Area code: 04712
- Website: www.bergimdrautal.at

Berg im Drautal is a village and municipality in the district of Spittal an der Drau in the Austrian state of Carinthia.

== Geography ==
It is situated in Drava Valley, forty kilometers west from Spittal. The municipality is situated between the Gailtaler Alpen in the south and the Kreuzeck group in the north.

The field of community lies on the Drautal Straße (B 100) road, which connects Berg with Spittal an der Drau (c. 40 km towards east) and Lienz in Osttirol (c. 35 km westerly).

== Tourism ==
The berg im drautal also features the popular restaurant and holiday resort Glocknerhof. Note that Glocknerhof is a resort centred around Radio-controlled aircraft and also features a RC-aircraft airport.
