= Steinfeld, Austria =

Steinfeld
- Municipality
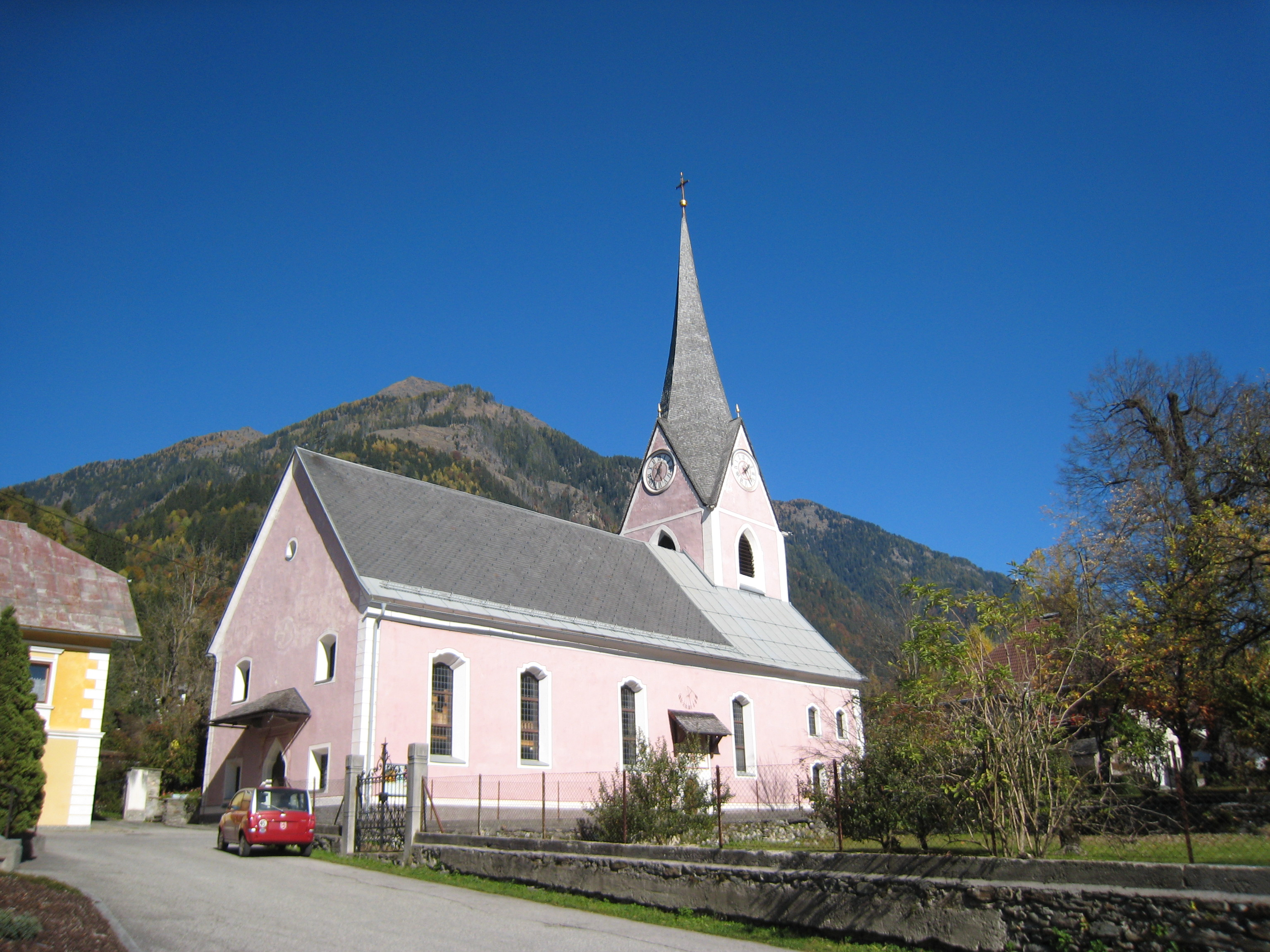
- Steinfeld parish church

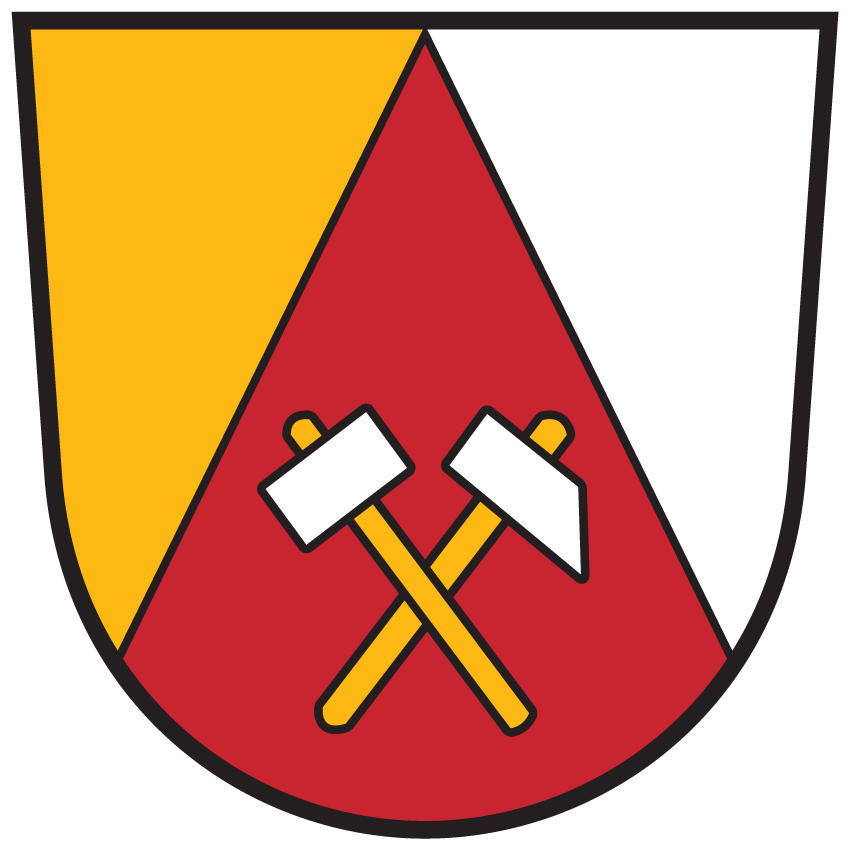
- Coat of arms

- Location within Austria
- Coordinates: 46°45′N 13°15′E
- Country: Austria
- State: Carinthia
- District: Spittal an der Drau

Government
  - Mayor: Ewald Tschabitscher

Area
  - Total: 81.37 km^{2} (31.42 sq mi)
- Elevation: 617 m (2,024 ft)

Population (2018-01-01)
  - Total: 2,051
  - Density: 25.21/km^{2} (65.28/sq mi)
- Time zone: UTC+1 (CET)
  - Summer (DST): UTC+2 (CEST)
- Postal code: 9754
- Area code: 04717
- Website: www.steinfeld.at

Steinfeld (German pronunciation: [ˈʃtaɪnˌfɛlt]; Slovene: Kamen) is a town in the district of Spittal an der Drau in Carinthia in Austria.

== Geography ==
Steinfeld is located at an average altitude of 617 m above sea level in the Upper Drautal, at the foot of the Kreuzeck group mountain range.

The municipality is divided into five cadastral communities: Fellbach, Gerlamoos, Radlach, Rottenstein, and Steinfeld.

=== Districts ===
The municipal area comprises the following twelve localities (population in brackets as of 1 January 2024):

- Althaus (6)
- Fellbach (76)
- Fellberg (7)
- Flattachberg (23)
- Gajach (114)
- Gerlamoos (141)
- Mitterberg (46)
- Oberallach (49)
- Radlach (180)
- Raggnitz (0)
- Rottenstein (67)
- Steinfeld (1307)

== History ==
The parish church in Radlach and the name of the current main town of the municipality were first mentioned in the ducal land register in 1267/68. This property register also shows the relatively low agricultural usability of the current municipal area. Steinfeld was also at a disadvantage in terms of traffic and thus trade compared to the neighbouring traffic hubs of Greifenburg and Sachsenburg.

From the 15th century onwards, the mining industry – initially mining gold and precious metals, later also iron processing – was a key factor in Steinfeld's economic development. From the late Middle Ages onwards, mining led to the settlement of tradesmen, whose buildings still shape the appearance of the market today (Singerhof, Neustein Castle, the Porcia family's administrator's house on the main street). However, mining activity suffered setbacks as early as 1600. As a result, the town lost its market infrastructure over the centuries and declined back into a village. At the time of the First World War, mining finally ceased completely.

In 1924, a cooperative from Steinfeld and four other communities built the Steinfeld am Grabach power plant. This was destroyed by a landslide in 1935, and a replacement was built in 1936.

The construction of the railway (Drava Valley Railway) from the late 19th century and the associated establishment of wood processing companies brought a new boom to the community, which culminated in the AVE furniture factory, which existed from 1932 to 1986 and employed up to 270 people. In the 20th century, summer tourism and gastronomy also developed into important economic sectors in the community.

The current municipality was formed in 1850. Apart from the transfer of smaller areas to Greifenburg in 1973, its size has not changed since then. Steinfeld was granted fair privileges as early as 1680 and was officially elevated to market town status in 1930.

== Population ==
According to the 2001 census, Steinfeld has 2,291 inhabitants, of whom 95.6% have Austrian citizenship and 2.6% have Turkish citizenship. 88.3% of the population are Roman Catholic, 4.5% are Protestant and 3.9% are of Islamic faith. 2.4% have no religious affiliation.

== Sights ==
- Raggnitz Castle
- Rottenstein Castle Ruins
- Renaissance castle Neustein
- Catholic Parish Church Steinfeld-Radlach St. John the Baptist in Steinfeld
- Catholic branch church Gerlamoos with frescoes by Thomas von Villach
- Catholic Filial Church Radlach St. Martin
- Gerlamooser Gorge with waterfall

== Economy ==
=== Economic sectors ===
Of the 120 agricultural holdings in 2010, 31 were full-time and 73 part-time farms; two were run by partnerships and 14 by legal entities. These 14 farmed over thirty per cent of the land, while full-time farmers farmed over forty per cent. Although the number of farms in the production sector increased from 2001 to 2011, the number of employees decreased. This mainly affected the manufacturing segment. The largest employers in the service sector were the social and public services and the trade sectors.

=== Commuters ===
Of the approximately 860 employed people who lived in Steinfeld in 2011, one-third worked in the municipality, and two-thirds commuted. 160 people came to work in Steinfeld from the bypass.

=== Traffic ===
The Drautal road (B 100) and the Drautalbahn Drava Valley Railway (station “Steinfeld im Drautal”) run through the municipality.

== Politics ==
=== Municipal council and mayor ===
The municipal council of Steinfeld has 19 members and has been composed as follows since the municipal election in 2015:

- 10 SPÖ
- 4 Team Aufwind
- 2 FPÖ
- 3 ÖVP

The directly elected mayor is Ewald Tschabitscher (SPÖ).

=== Coat of arms ===
The coat of arms shows "a shield divided by a rising red tip of gold and silver. The miners' emblems cross at the tip: a silver hammer over a silver iron with golden handles." The tinge is in the state colours of Carinthia, which are designed here as a shield split with a rising tip. The coat of arms and flag, the latter coloured white and red with an incorporated coat of arms, were awarded to Steinfeld on the occasion of the town's elevation to market town status on December 14, 1931.

== Culture ==
Alois Brandstetter describes the church in Gerlamoos with its frescoes in his novel Here the Innkeeper Cooks.

== Notable people ==
=== Honorary citizen ===
Honorary citizens of the municipality are:

- 1924: Johann Glantschnig, a teacher in Steinfeld and sculptor
- 1949: Heinrich Hopfgartner, Papal House Prelate and Cathedral Canon of Gurk
- 1959: Josef Fräß-Ehrfeld, entrepreneur and member of the state parliament
- 1968: Franz Pischelsberger, Mayor
- 2000: Fritz Strobl, ski racer
- 2006: Elfriede Stark-Petrasch, artist
- 2006: Karl Stark, artist

=== Sons and daughters of the community ===
- Josef Mayer (1806–1891), landowner, factory owner and politician
- Franz Feldner (1818–1879), Austrian notary, lawyer and politician
- Friedrich Marx (1830–1905, born in Steinfeld), writer and kuk officer, a street is named after him here
- Erich Stocker (* 1942), geographer

=== Personalities associated with the community ===
- Bernhard Egger (1866–1950), politician
- Fritz Leitner (1946–1991), politician (SPÖ)
- Franz Schwager (1945–2018), politician (TS, previously FPÖ)
- Fritz Strobl (* 1972), former ski racer and Olympic champion, grew up in Gerlamoos
