= Iselsberg Pass =

Mountain pass in the Austrian Alps

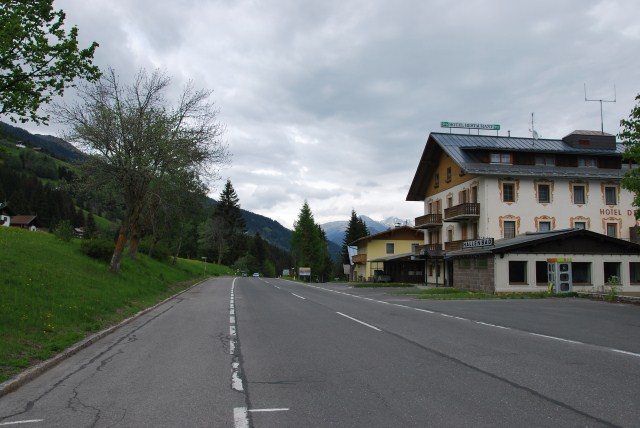
- Summit

- Location within Alps
- Elevation: 1,209 m (3,967 ft)

Third Approach
- Location: Austria
- Range: Alps
- Coordinates: 46°51′N 12°51′E

The Iselsberg Pass, at 1,209 m (3,967 ft), is a high mountain pass in the Austrian Alps between the states of Tyrol and Carinthia. (Qualdich shows a discrepancy with the pass elevation 1,204 m vs 1,209 m) It separates the mountains of the Kreuzeck group in the south from the Schober group in the north, both parts of the Hohe Tauern range.

The pass road connects Lienz in East Tyrol with Winklern in the Carinthian Möll valley. A bridle path across the Iselsberg was already built in Roman times, to reach the mines in the Möll valley from Aguntum. The village of Iselsberg is located about 1 kilometre (0.62 mi) southwest of the summit.

== See also ==
- List of highest paved roads in Europe
- List of mountain passes
