= Spittal an der Drau District =

Coordinates: 46.833°N 13.306°E

Spittal an der Drau District Bezirk Spittal an der Drau
- District
- Country: Austria
- State: Carinthia
- Number of municipalities: 33
- Administrative seat: Spittal an der Drau

Area
  - Total: 2,763.99 km^{2} (1,067.18 sq mi)

Population (2024)
  - Total: 75,803
  - Density: 27.425/km^{2} (71.031/sq mi)
- Time zone: UTC+01:00 (CET)
  - Summer (DST): UTC+02:00 (CEST)
- Telephone prefix: 42.../47.../48...
- Vehicle registration: SP
- NUTS code: AT212
- District code: 206

Bezirk Spittal an der Drau (Slovene: Okrožje Špital ob Dravi) is an administrative district (Bezirk) in the state of Carinthia, Austria.

== Geography ==
With an area of the district is 2,763.99 km², it is Austria's second largest district by area (after Liezen), even larger than the Austrian state of Vorarlberg, and by far the largest district in Carinthia. The administrative centre is Spittal an der Drau, other major settlements are Gmünd, Greifenburg, Millstatt, Obervellach, Radenthein, Seeboden, Steinfeld, and Winklern.

Together with the neighbouring districts of Hermagor and Feldkirchen, Spittal forms the Upper Carinthia (Oberkärnten) region according to the Nomenclature of Territorial Units for Statistics (NUTS). It borders on East Tyrol (Lienz District) in the west and the Austrian state of Salzburg in the north.

The mountainous area comprises the southern ranges of the High Tauern and the Möll valley, the western Gurktal Alps (Nock Mountains), as well as the broad Drava Valley and the northern slopes of the Gailtal Alps. The highest point is the peak of the Grossglockner, Austria's highest mountain at 3,798 metres (12,461 ft). The district also includes Millstätter See and Weissensee, two of the major Carinthian lakes.

== Administrative divisions ==
The district is divided into 33 municipalities, three of them are towns and ten of them are market towns.

=== Towns ===
1. Gmünd (Slovene: Sovodje; 2,520)
2. Radenthein (Slovene: Radenče; 5,777)
3. Spittal an der Drau (Slovene: Špital ob Dravi; 15,270)

=== Market towns ===
1. Greifenburg (1,737)
2. Lurnfeld (Slovene: Lurnsko polje; 2,661)
3. Millstatt (Slovene: Milje; 3,462)
4. Oberdrauburg (Slovene: Gornji Dravograd; 1,203)
5. Obervellach (Slovene: Zgornja Bela; 2,206)
6. Rennweg am Katschberg (1,705)
7. Sachsenburg (1,366)
8. Seeboden (Slovene: Jezernica; 6,645)
9. Steinfeld (Slovene: Kamen; 2,009)
10. Winklern (Slovene: Kotlje; 1,202)

=== Municipalities ===
1. Bad Kleinkirchheim (Slovene: Cirkniške Toplice; 1,682)
2. Baldramsdorf (1,848)
3. Berg im Drautal (Slovene: Gora v Dravski dolini; 1,373)
4. Dellach im Drautal (Slovene: Dole v Dravski dolini; 1,229)
5. Flattach (1,157)
6. Großkirchheim (Slovene: Veliko Cirkno; 1,321)
7. Heiligenblut(Slovene: Sveta Kri) (964)
8. Irschen (Slovene: Rženo; 1,966)
9. Kleblach-Lind (1,159)
10. Krems in Kärnten (1,683)
11. Lendorf (1,753)
12. Mallnitz (Slovene: Malnice; 766)
13. Malta (1,902)
14. Mörtschach (Slovene: Morče; 834)
15. Mühldorf (Slovene: Mlina Vas; 1,012)
16. Rangersdorf (1,690)
17. Reißeck (Slovene: Rajžek; 2,09q)
18. Stall (1,476)
19. Trebesing (Slovene: Trebežinče; 1,162)
20. Weißensee (Slovene: Belo jezero; 769)

(Population figures as of May 9, 2024)
