= Stall, Austria =

Stall
- Municipality
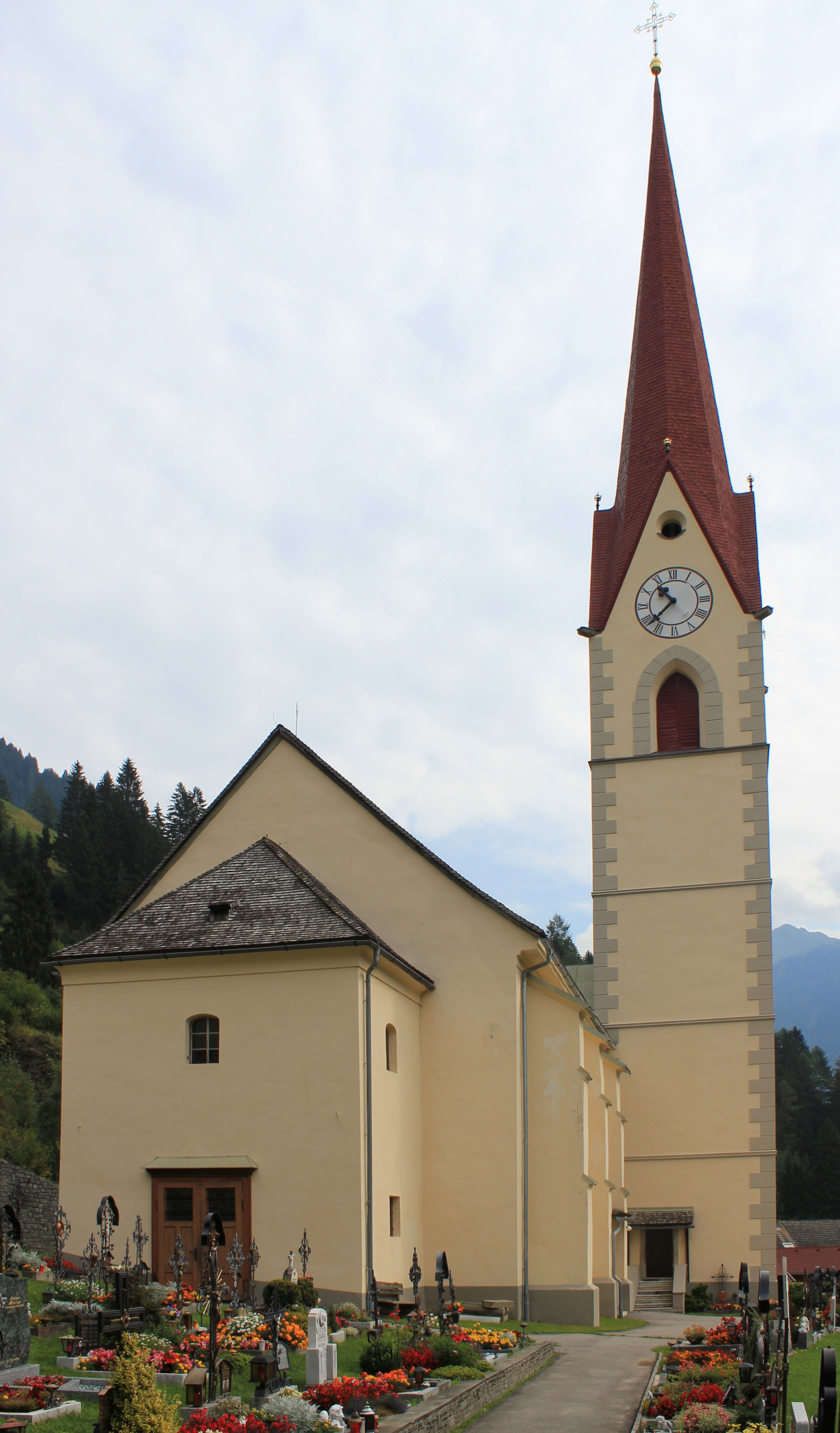
- Stall parish church

- Coat of arms

- Location within Austria
- Coordinates: 46°53′N 13°2′E
- Country: Austria
- State: Carinthia
- District: Spittal an der Drau

Government
  - Mayor: Peter Ebner

Area
  - Total: 96.4 km^{2} (37.2 sq mi)
- Elevation: 867 m (2,844 ft)

Population (2018-01-01)
  - Total: 1,575
  - Density: 16.3/km^{2} (42.3/sq mi)
- Time zone: UTC+1 (CET)
  - Summer (DST): UTC+2 (CEST)
- Postal code: 9832
- Area code: 04823
- Website: www.gemeinde-stall.at

Stall is a municipality in the district of Spittal an der Drau in the Austrian state of Carinthia.

== Geography ==
Stall lies in the central Möll Valley, between the Goldberg Group on the north and the Kreuzeck Group on the south.
