= Lendorf =

- Municipality
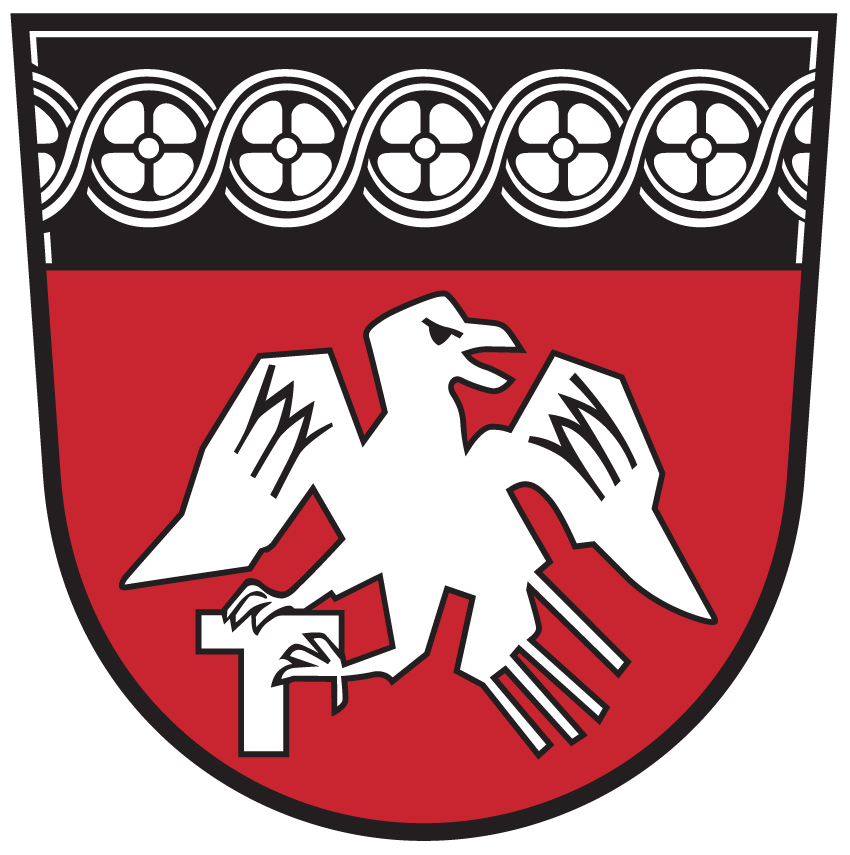
- Coat of arms

- Location within Austria
- Coordinates: 46°50′N 13°25′E
- Country: Austria
- State: Carinthia
- District: Spittal an der Drau

Government
  - Mayor: Gottfried Willegger (SPÖ)

Area
  - Total: 34.31 km^{2} (13.25 sq mi)
- Elevation: 584 m (1,916 ft)

Population (2018-01-01)
  - Total: 1,712
  - Density: 49.90/km^{2} (129.2/sq mi)
- Time zone: UTC+1 (CET)
  - Summer (DST): UTC+2 (CEST)
- Postal code: 9811
- Area code: 04762
- Website: www.lendorf.at

Lendorf is a municipality in the district of Spittal an der Drau in the Austrian state of Carinthia.

== Geography ==
It consists of the Katastralgemeinden Lendorf and Hühnersberg.

== History ==
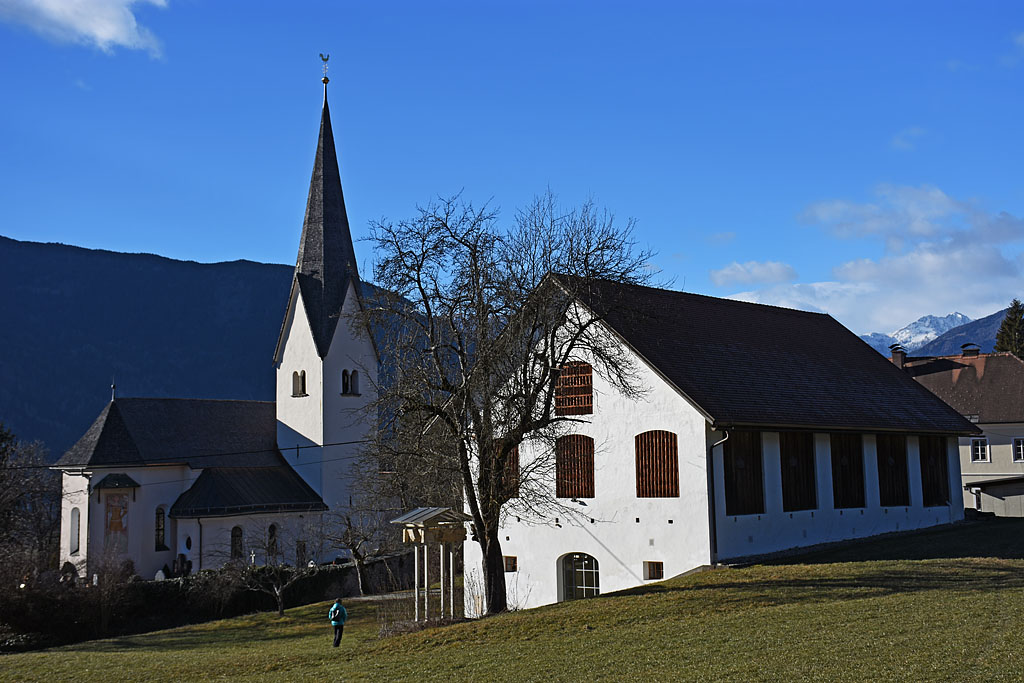
St. Peter in Holz, church and museum of Teurnia.

Situated in the Drava valley west of Spittal an der Drau, Lendorf is the site of an ancient town with about 30,000 inhabitants called Teurnia (later Tiburnia), that arose about 50 and in the 5th century became the capital of the Roman province Noricum mediterraneum. The remains of the town including a Forum, a basilica, capitol, thermae and a temple dedicated to the Celtic god Grannus can be seen on a hill near the village of Sankt Peter in Holz. Until its downfall during the Slavic settlement about 600 Teurnia was a centre of Early Christianity, being the seat of a bishop as mentioned by Eugippius in his biography of Saint Severinus, the "Apostle to Noricum". Tiburnia still is a titular see of the Roman Catholic Church.

== Transportation ==
Lendorf can be reached via the A10 Tauern Autobahn at the Spittal/Millstättersee interchange and the B100 Drautal Straße federal highway from Spittal to Lienz. It also has access to the Drautalbahn from Villach to Innichen at Lendorf station.
