= Mörtschach =

- Municipality
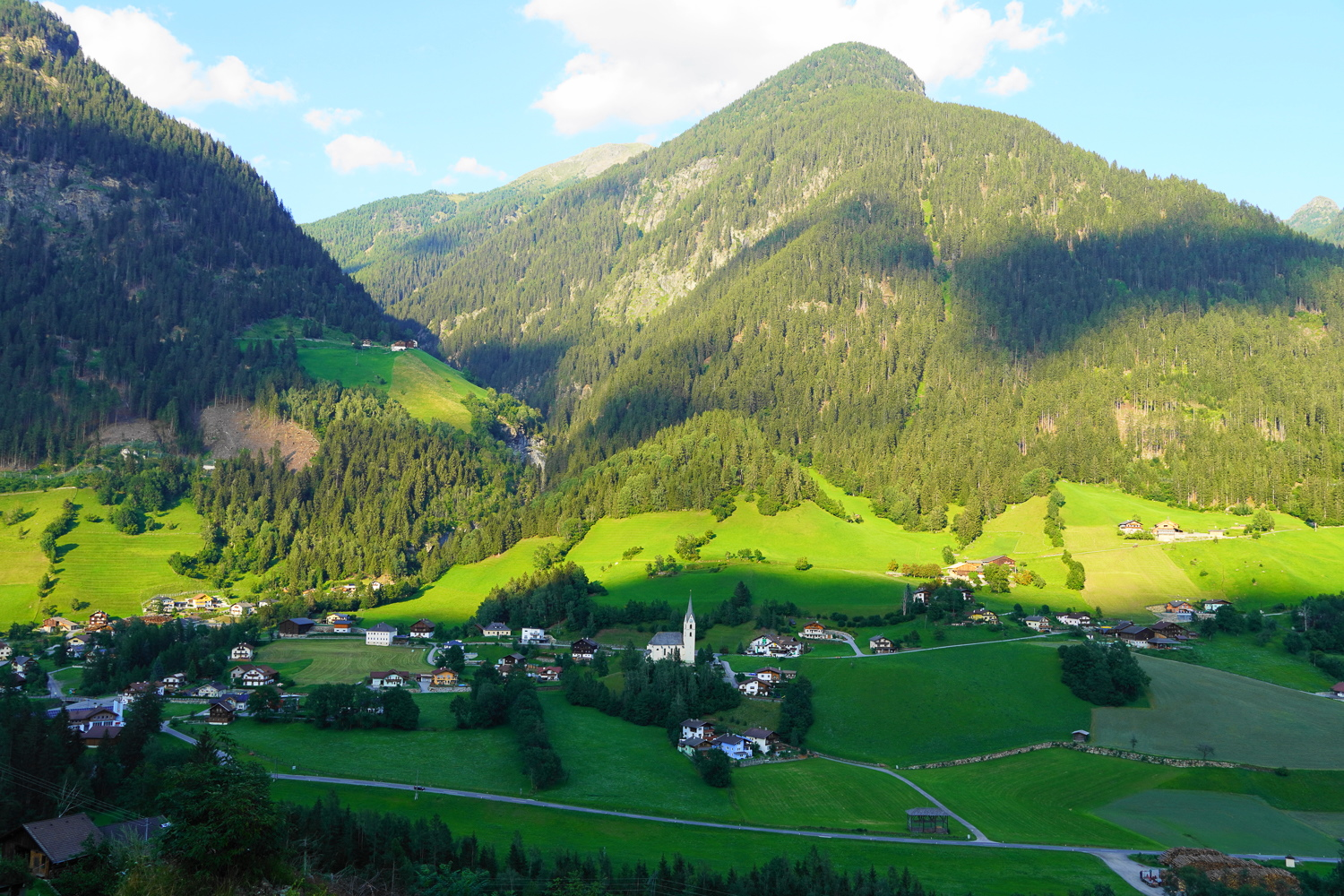

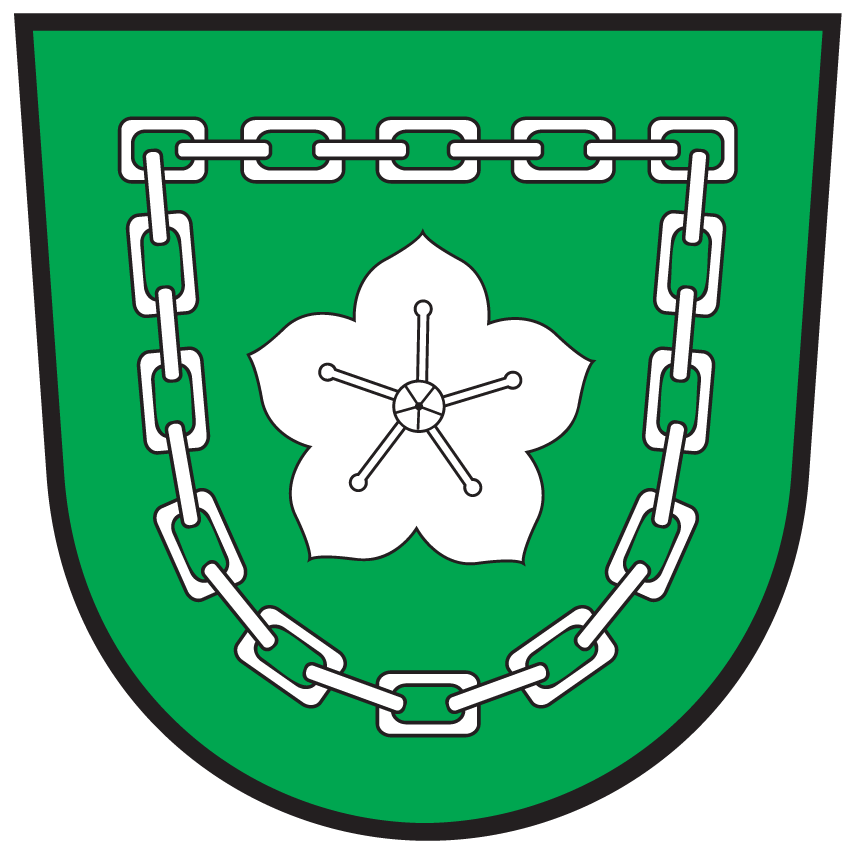
- Coat of arms

- Location within Austria
- Coordinates: 46°55′N 12°55′E
- Country: Austria
- State: Carinthia
- District: Spittal an der Drau

Government
  - Mayor: Horst Plössnig

Area
  - Total: 74.85 km^{2} (28.90 sq mi)
- Elevation: 934 m (3,064 ft)

Population (2018-01-01)
  - Total: 816
  - Density: 10.9/km^{2} (28.2/sq mi)
- Time zone: UTC+1 (CET)
  - Summer (DST): UTC+2 (CEST)
- Postal code: 9842
- Area code: 04826
- Website: www.nationalparkgemeinde-moertschach.at

Mörtschach is a town in the district of Spittal an der Drau in Carinthia in Austria.

== Geography ==
Mörtschach is located between the Großglockner massif, the Lienz Dolomites, and the Schober and Kreuzeck peaks.
