= Trebesing =

- Municipality
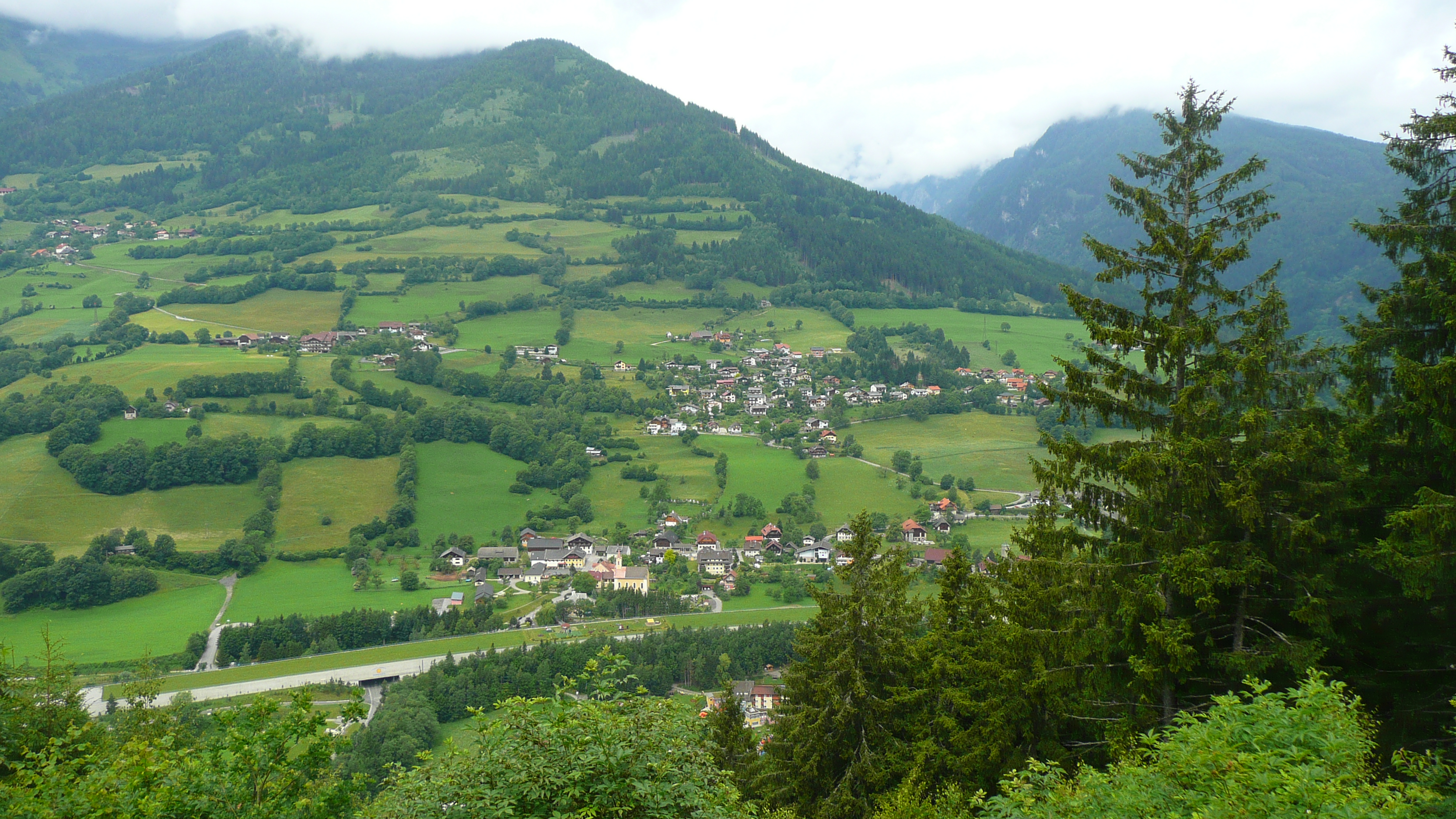
- View of Trebesing

- Coat of arms

- Location within Austria
- Coordinates: 46°53′N 13°31′E
- Country: Austria
- State: Carinthia
- District: Spittal an der Drau

Government
  - Mayor: Dipl.-Ing. Christian Genshofer

Area
  - Total: 73.76 km^{2} (28.48 sq mi)
- Elevation: 735 m (2,411 ft)

Population (2018-01-01)
  - Total: 1,158
  - Density: 15.70/km^{2} (40.66/sq mi)
- Time zone: UTC+1 (CET)
  - Summer (DST): UTC+2 (CEST)
- Postal code: 9852
- Area code: 04732
- Website: www.trebesing.at

Trebesing is a town in the district of Spittal an der Drau in the Austrian state of Carinthia.

== Geography ==
Trebesing lies within the valley of the Lieser river in upper Carinthia not far from the national park of the Hohe Tauern about 12 km north of Spittal an der Drau. The municipality stretches from the Lieser west to the foothills of the Hohe Tauern with the Reißeck (el. 2985 m) as its highest point.
