= Irschen =

- Municipality
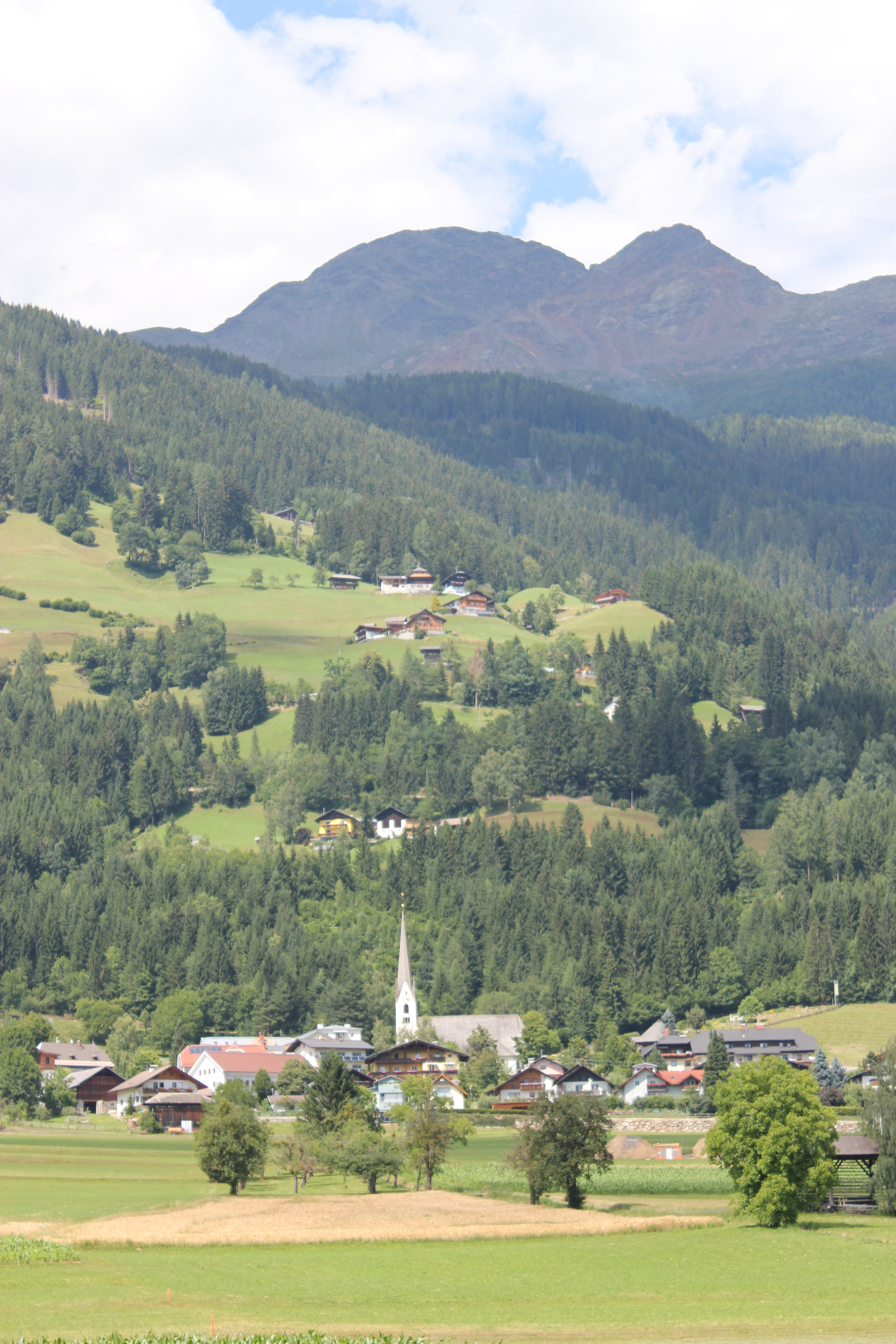

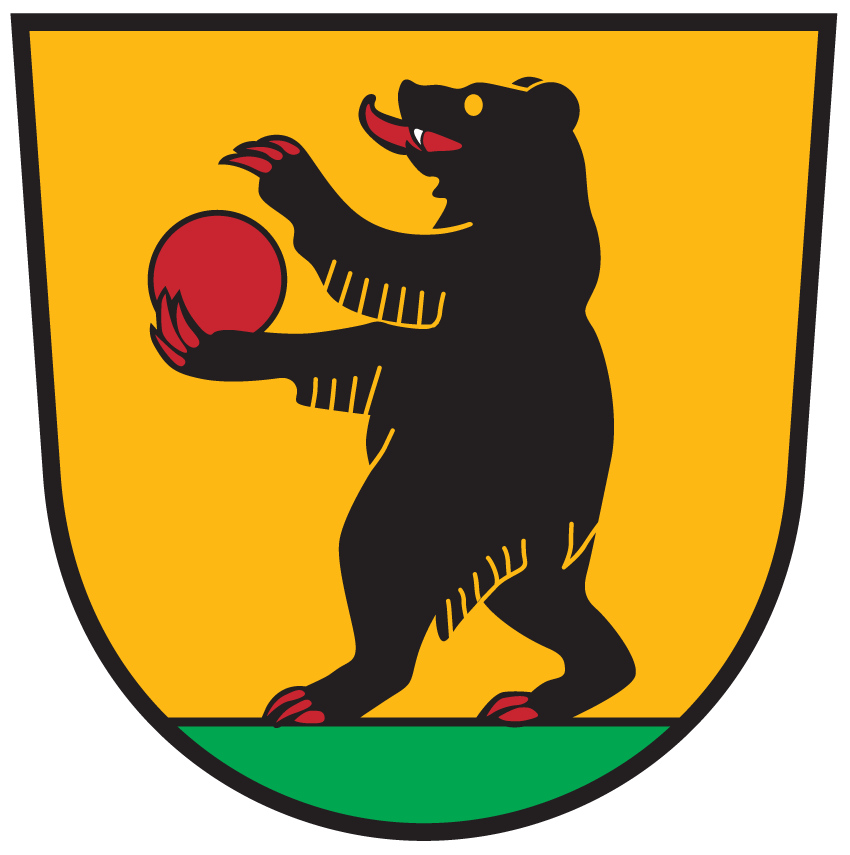
- Coat of arms

- Location within Austria
- Coordinates: 46°45′N 13°1′E
- Country: Austria
- State: Carinthia
- District: Spittal an der Drau

Government
  - Mayor: Gottfried Mandler

Area
  - Total: 33.35 km^{2} (12.88 sq mi)
- Elevation: 809 m (2,654 ft)

Population (2018-01-01)
  - Total: 2,022
  - Density: 60.63/km^{2} (157.0/sq mi)
- Time zone: UTC+1 (CET)
  - Summer (DST): UTC+2 (CEST)
- Postal code: 9773
- Area code: 04710
- Website: www.irschen.at

Irschen is a municipality in the district of Spittal an der Drau in the Austrian state of Carinthia.

== Geography ==
It consists of the Katastralgemeinden Irschen, Ritterdorf, and Simmerlach. It is situated on the northern slope of the Upper Drava Valley, near the B 100 Drautal Straße highway and the Drautalbahn railway line.

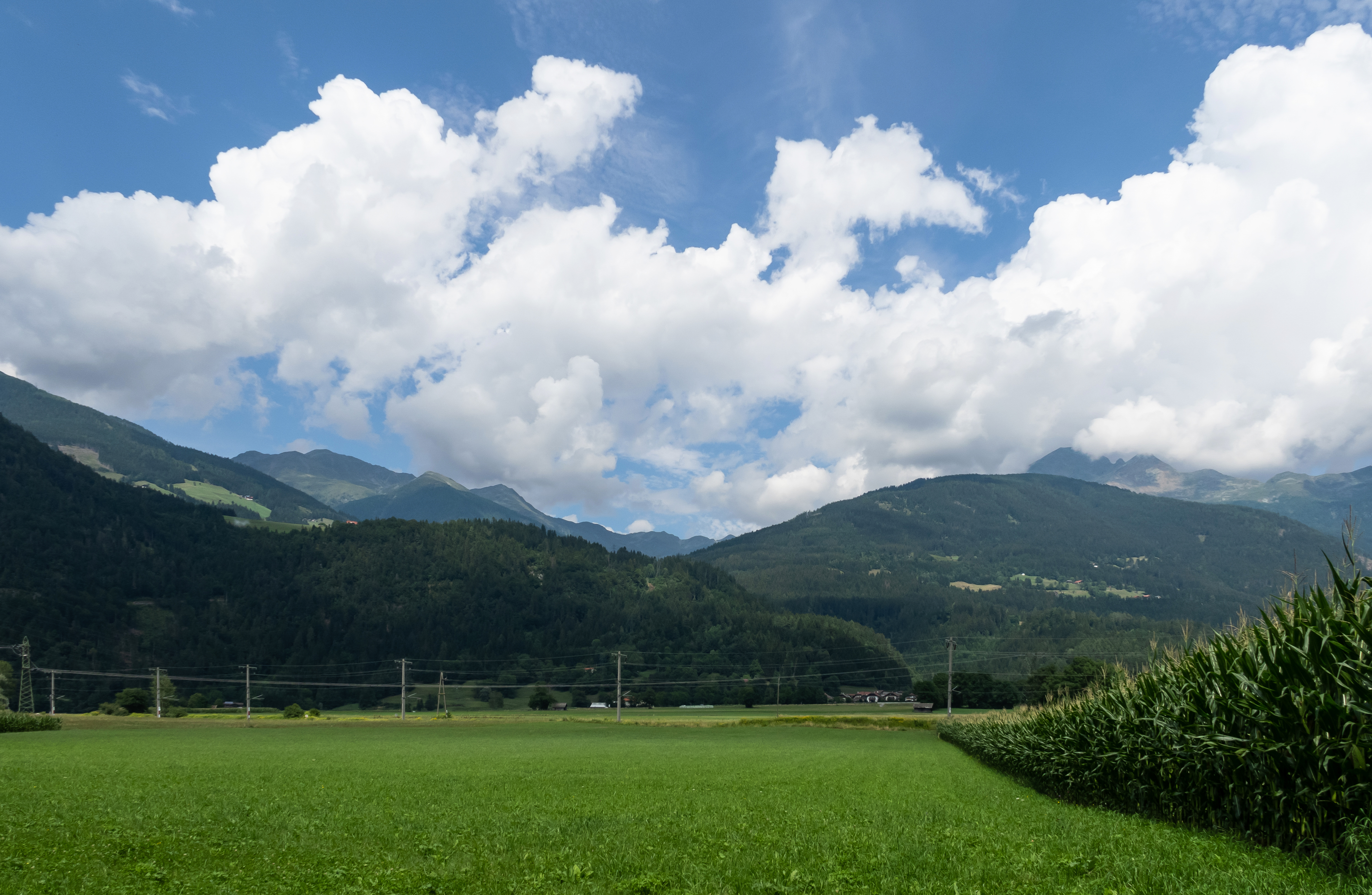
Panorama near Potschling, panorama

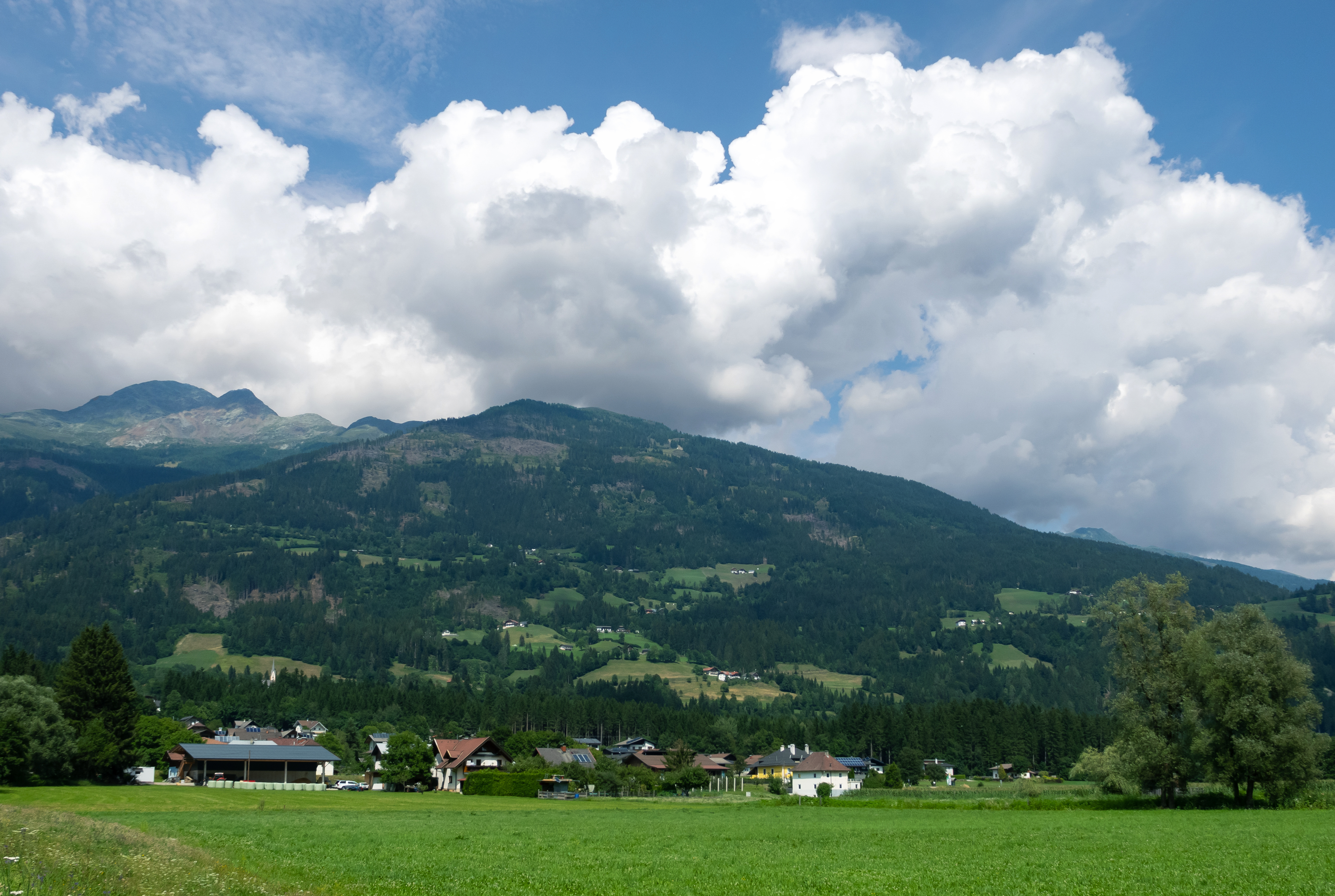
View to Gröfelhof

== History ==
A settlement area since the Early Iron Age (Hallstatt Culture), Irschen may be identical to the Idunum polis in the former Celtic kingdom of Noricum, as mentioned in Ptolemy's Geographia. In Roman times a mansio laid on the road leading over the Gailbergsattel mountain pass to Italia. Ursus I, Patriarch of Aquileia probably built the first church about 810 in the place then called Ursen, which was mentioned as Castrum Ursen in a 1086 deed. In medieval times Irschen was a mining area, especially for gold.

It was recently revealed that the English actress Billie Piper has a home in this region.
