= Kleblach-Lind =

- Municipality
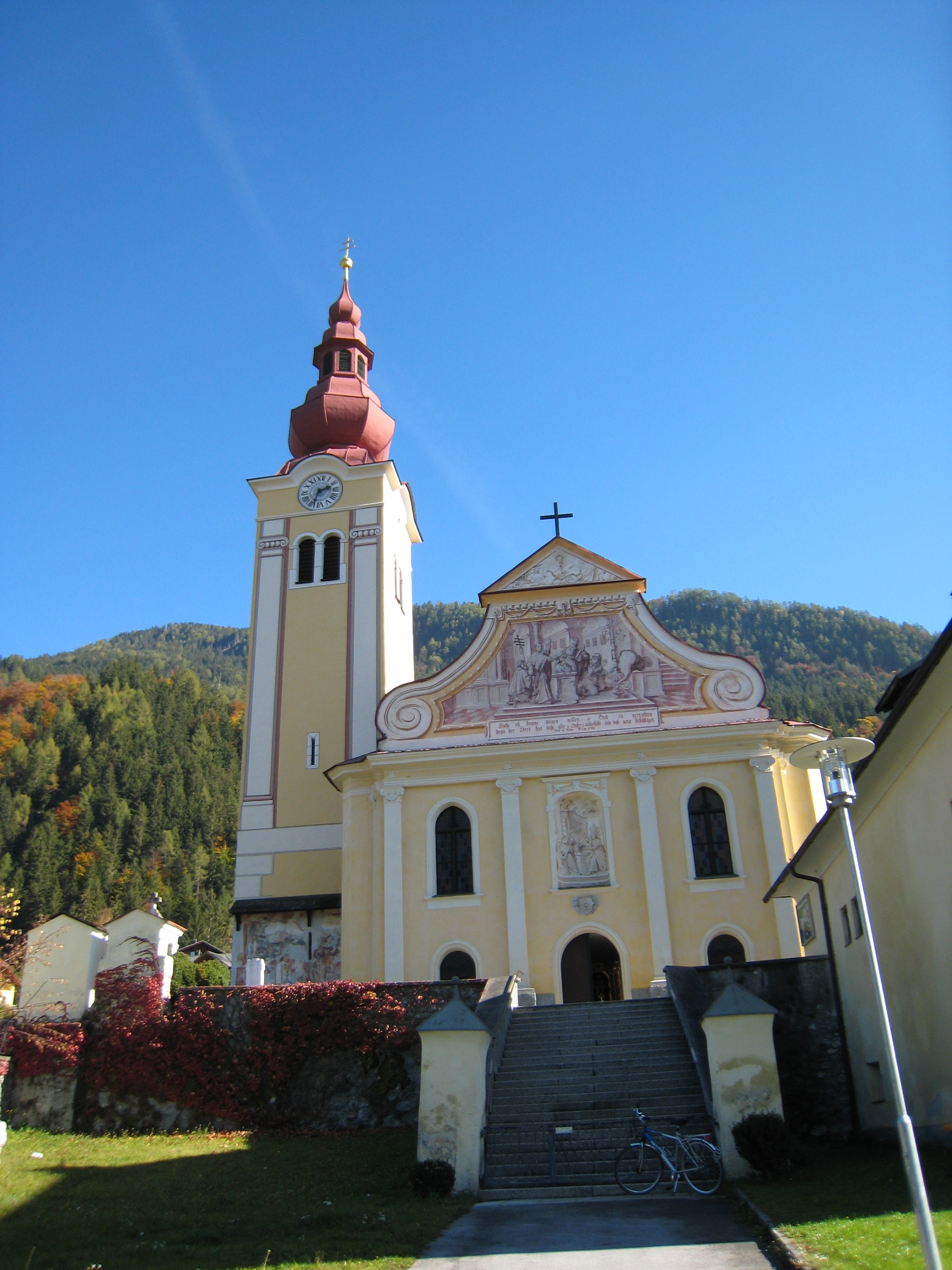
- Kleblach-Lind parish church

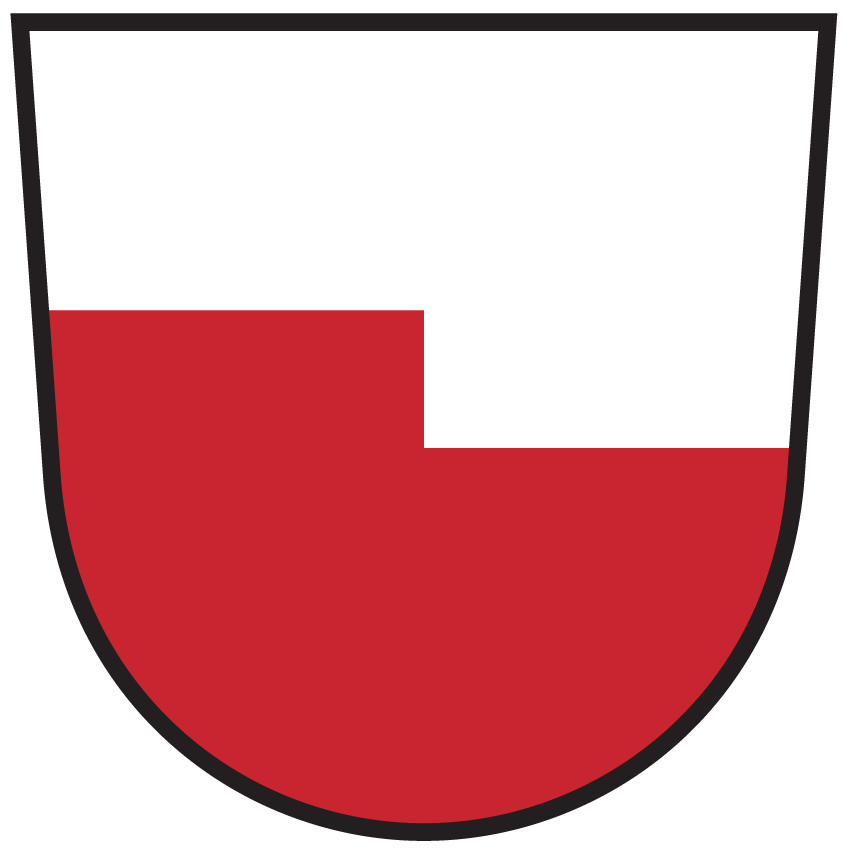
- Coat of arms

- Location within Austria
- Coordinates: 46°46′N 13°21′E
- Country: Austria
- State: Carinthia
- District: Spittal an der Drau

Government
  - Mayor: Peter Fleißner

Area
  - Total: 62.99 km^{2} (24.32 sq mi)
- Elevation: 589 m (1,932 ft)

Population (2018-01-01)
  - Total: 1,174
  - Density: 18.64/km^{2} (48.27/sq mi)
- Time zone: UTC+1 (CET)
  - Summer (DST): UTC+2 (CEST)
- Postal code: 9753
- Area code: 04768

Kleblach-Lind is a town in the district of Spittal an der Drau in the Austrian state of Carinthia.

== Geography ==
Kleblach-Lind lies on the east end of the upper Drau valley, about 10 km as the crow flies from Spittal an der Drau. The two towns are separated only by the Drau.
