= Dellach im Drautal =

Place in Carinthia, Austria

- Municipality
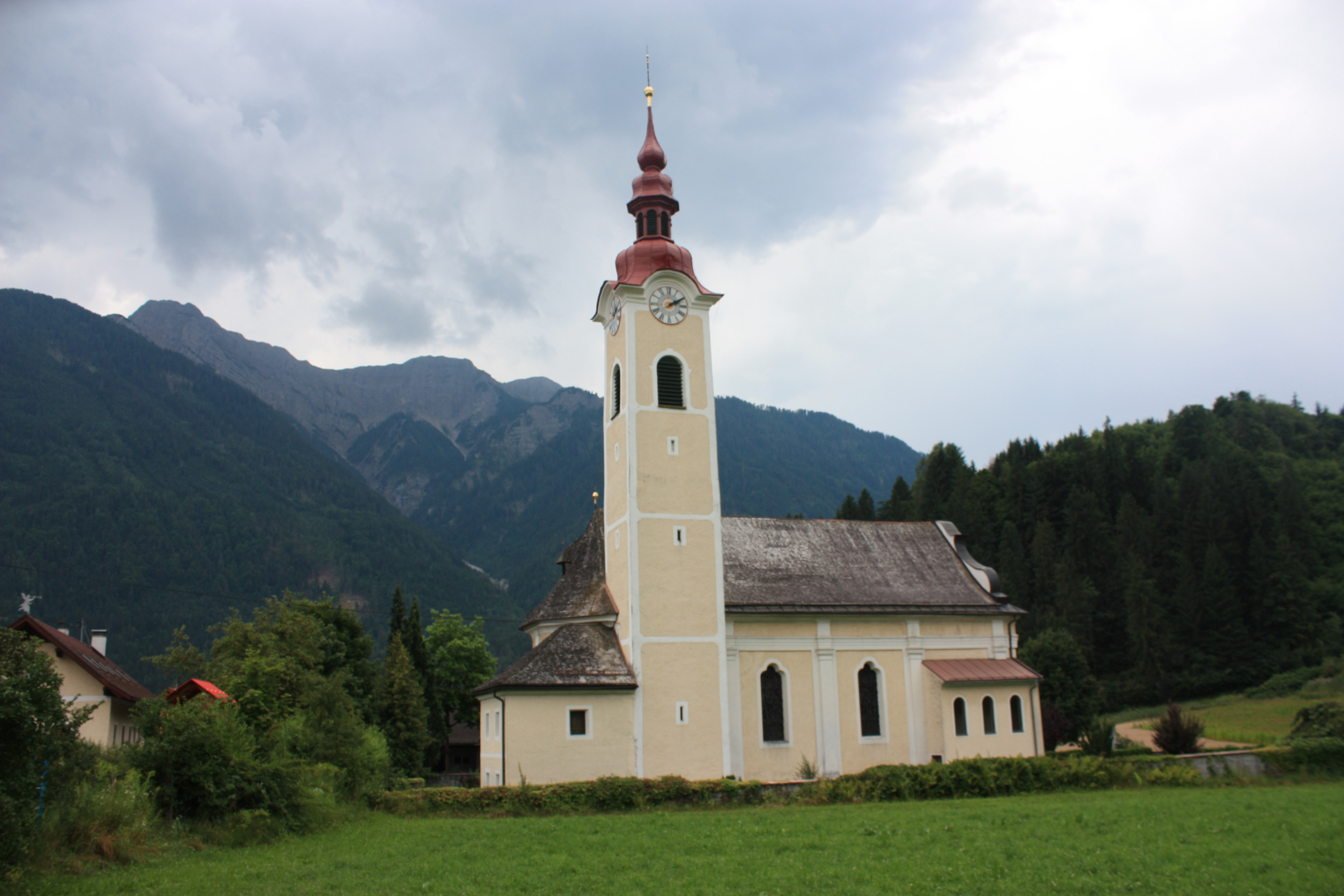
- Dellach im Drautal parish church

- Coat of arms

- Location within Austria
- Coordinates: 46°44′N 13°5′E
- Country: Austria
- State: Carinthia
- District: Spittal an der Drau

Government
  - Mayor: Johannes Pirker

Area
  - Total: 76.12 km^{2} (29.39 sq mi)
- Elevation: 614 m (2,014 ft)

Population (2018-01-01)
  - Total: 1,595
  - Density: 20.95/km^{2} (54.27/sq mi)
- Time zone: UTC+1 (CET)
  - Summer (DST): UTC+2 (CEST)
- Postal code: 9772
- Area code: 04714
- Website: www.dellach-drau.at

Dellach im Drautal is a town in the district of Spittal an der Drau in the Austrian state of Carinthia.

== Geography ==
Dellach im Drautal lies in the Drau valley about halfway between Lienz and Spittal, between the Gailtal Alps on the south and the Kreuzeck group of the Hohe Tauern on the north.

== Climate ==
Climate data for Dellach im Drautal, Austria
Month	Jan	Feb	Mar	Apr	May	Jun	Jul	Aug	Sep	Oct	Nov	Dec	Year
Mean daily maximum °C (°F)	1 (34)	7 (45)	12 (54)	16 (61)	22 (72)	23 (73)	26 (79)	25 (77)	20 (68)	15 (59)	6 (43)	1 (34)	15 (58)
Mean daily minimum °C (°F)	−6 (21)	−4 (25)	0 (32)	3 (37)	9 (48)	11 (52)	13 (55)	13 (55)	9 (48)	6 (43)	0 (32)	−5 (23)	4 (39)
Average precipitation mm (inches)	68 (2.7)	10 (0.4)	93 (3.7)	119 (4.7)	91 (3.6)	117 (4.6)	109 (4.3)	114 (4.5)	137 (5.4)	112 (4.4)	219 (8.6)	54 (2.1)	1,243 (49)
