= Winklern =

- Municipality
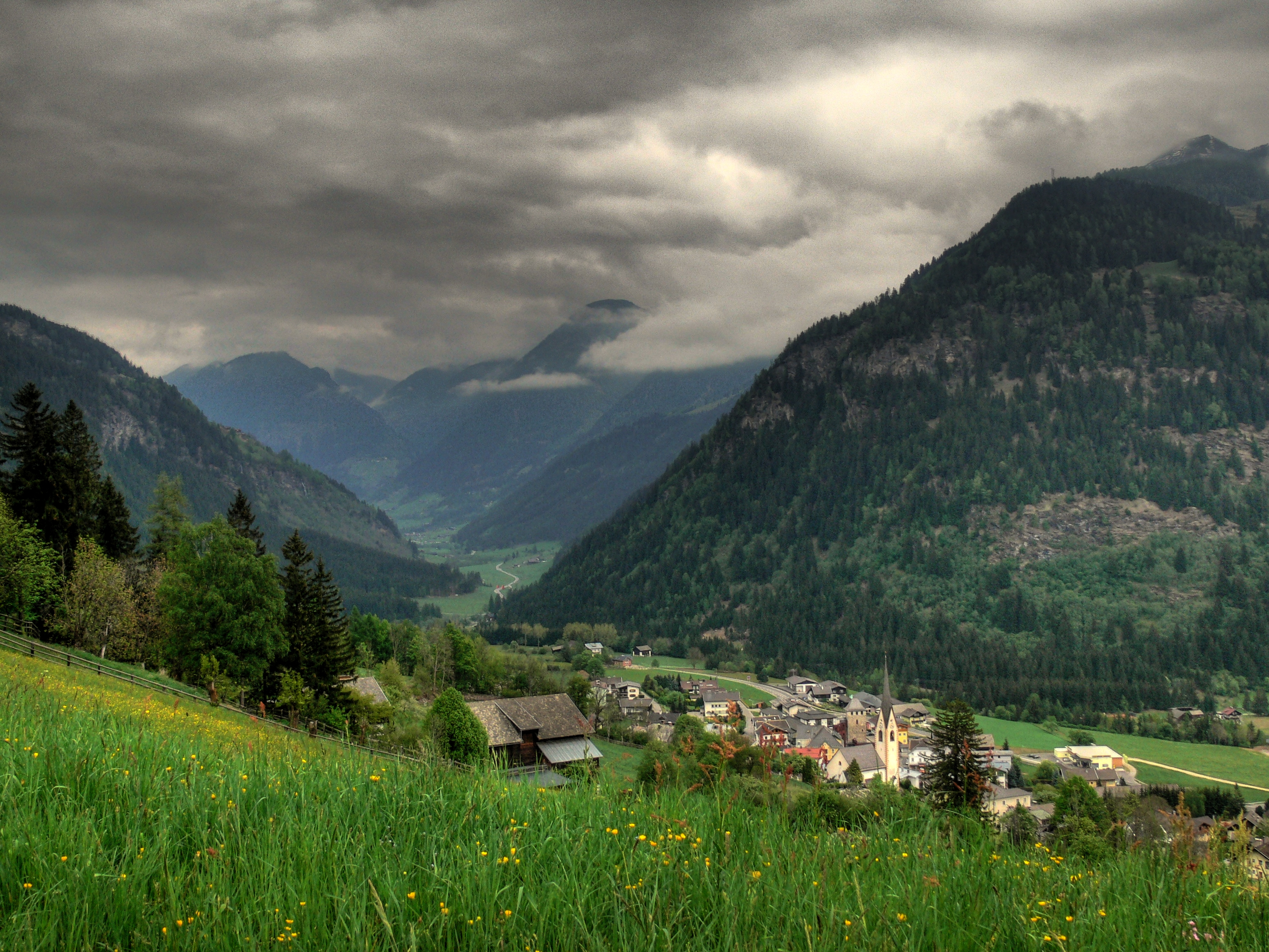
- Winklern seen from the southwest

- Coat of arms

- Location within Austria
- Coordinates: 46°52′N 12°53′E
- Country: Austria
- State: Carinthia
- District: Spittal an der Drau

Government
  - Mayor: Hermann Seebacher

Area
  - Total: 37.38 km^{2} (14.43 sq mi)
- Elevation: 966 m (3,169 ft)

Population (2018-01-01)
  - Total: 1,200
  - Density: 32/km^{2} (83/sq mi)
- Time zone: UTC+1 (CET)
  - Summer (DST): UTC+2 (CEST)
- Postal code: 9841
- Area code: 04822
- Website: www.winklern.at

Winklern is a town in the district of Spittal an der Drau in the Austrian state of Carinthia.

== Geography ==
The municipality lies at the foot of the Großglockner massif between the Schober, Goldberg, and Kreuzeck groups in the upper Möll valley.
