= Großkirchheim =

- Municipality
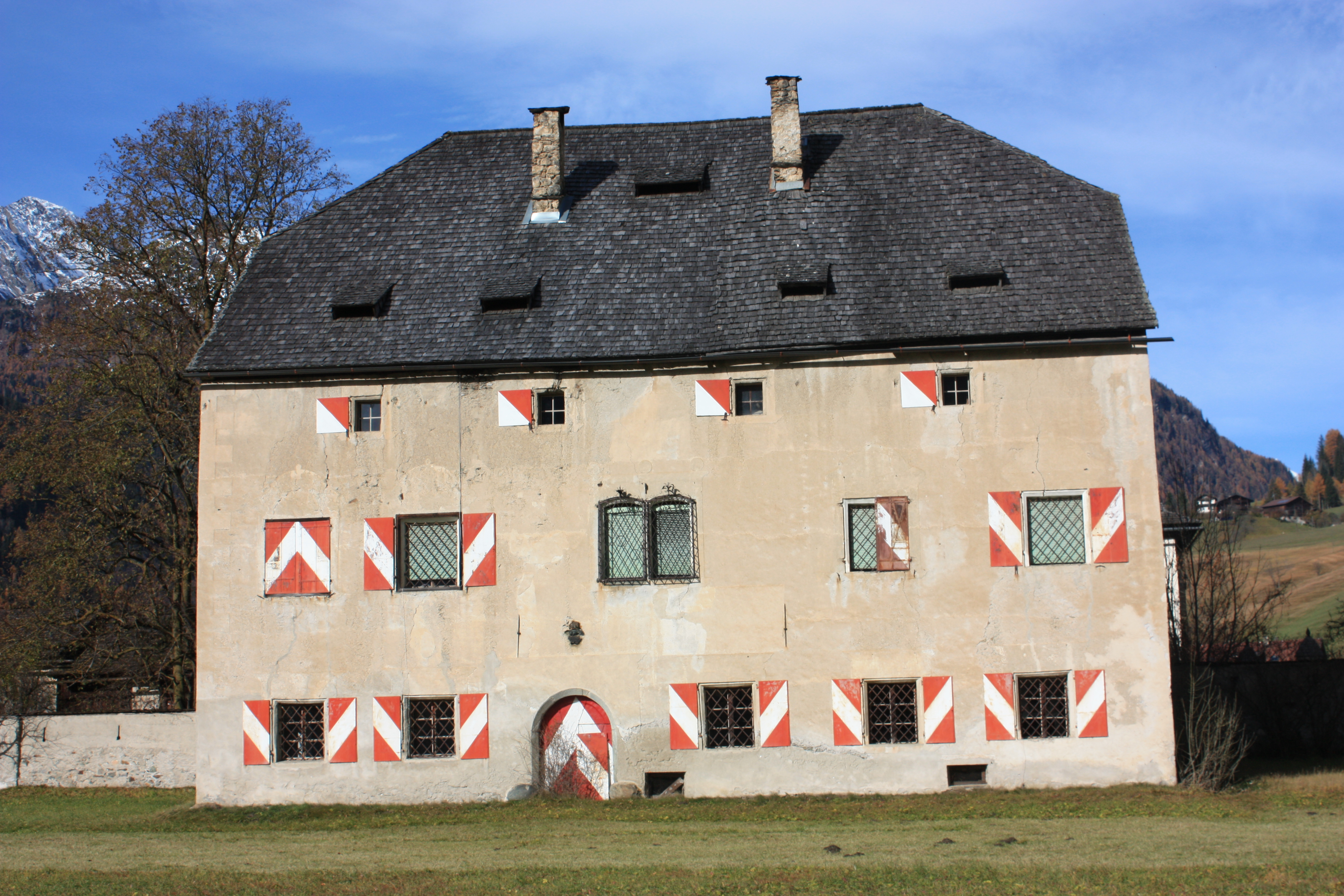
- Großkirchheim Castle

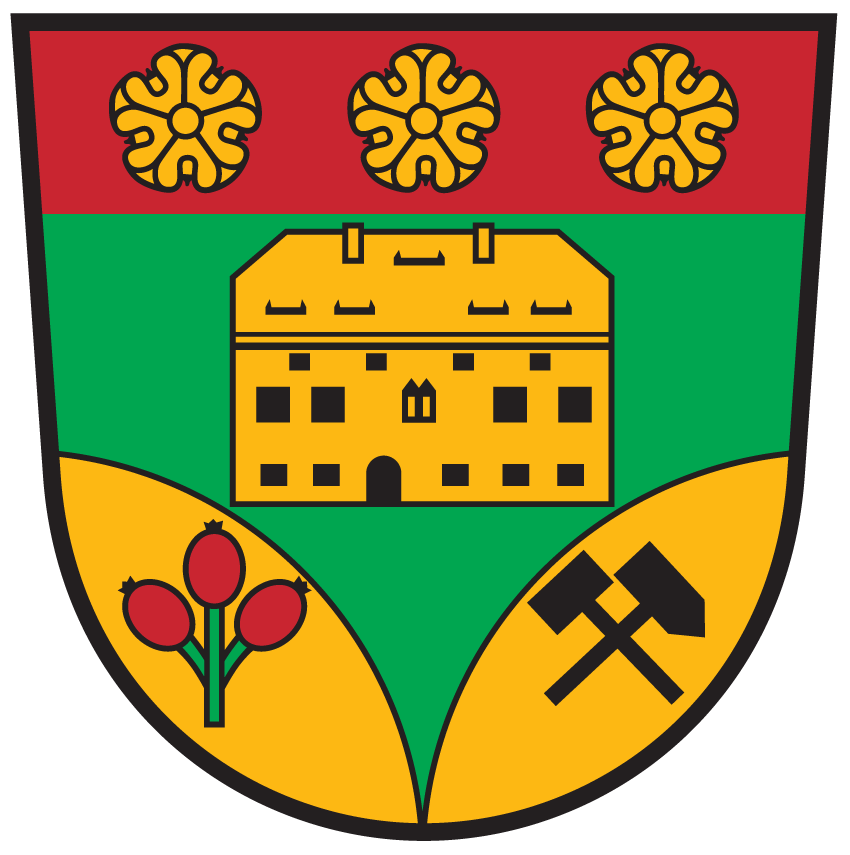
- Coat of arms

- Location within Austria
- Coordinates: 46°58′N 12°54′E
- Country: Austria
- State: Carinthia
- District: Spittal an der Drau

Government
  - Mayor: Peter Suntinger

Area
  - Total: 109.79 km^{2} (42.39 sq mi)
- Elevation: 1,024 m (3,360 ft)

Population (2018-01-01)
  - Total: 1,337
  - Density: 12.18/km^{2} (31.54/sq mi)
- Time zone: UTC+1 (CET)
  - Summer (DST): UTC+2 (CEST)
- Postal code: 9843
- Area code: 04825
- Website: www.grosskirchheim.gv.at

Großkirchheim is a town in the district of Spittal an der Drau in the Austrian state of Carinthia.

== Geography ==
Großkirchheim near the Großglockner of the Hohe Tauern. About 40 percent of the municipality lies in the national park Hohe Tauern.
