= Möll =

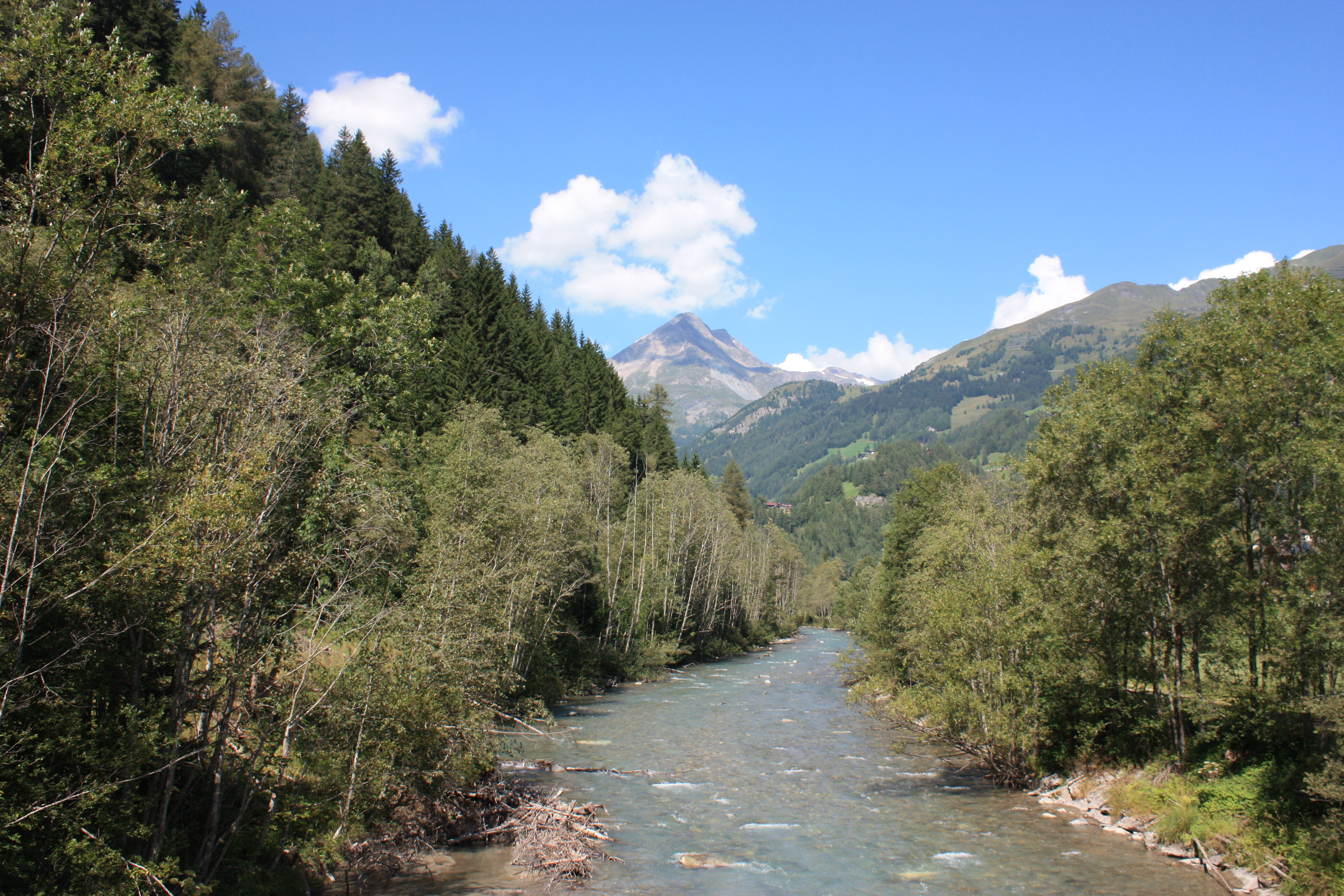
- Upper Möll near Heiligenblut

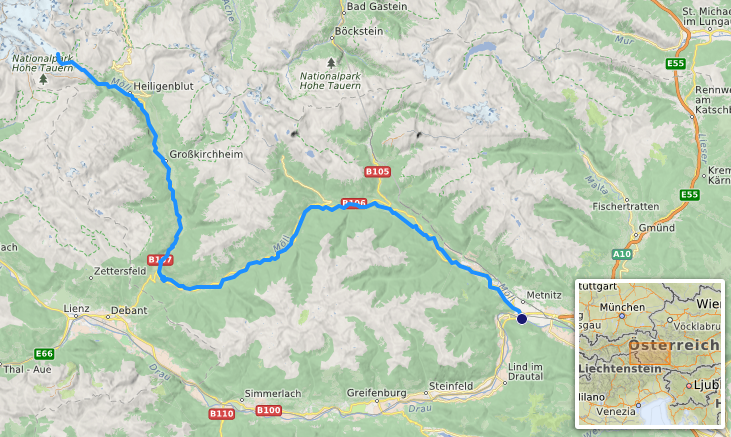

Location
- Country: Austria
- State: Carinthia

Physical characteristics
- Source
  - location: Pasterze Glacier, Grossglockner near Heiligenblut
  - coordinates: 47°4′39″N 12°44′4″E
  - elevation: 2,500 m (8,200 ft)
- Mouth
  - location: Drava near Möllbrücke
  - coordinates: 46°49′38″N 13°22′48″E
  - elevation: 549 m (1,801 ft)
- Length: 84.2 km (52.3 mi)
- Basin size: 1,100.8 km^{2} (425.0 mi^{2})
- Discharge
  - average: 24.9 m^{3}/s (880 cu ft/s)

Basin features
- Progression: Drava→ Danube→ Black Sea

The Möll (German pronunciation: [mœl]; presumably from Slovene: Mel, "rubble") is a river in northwestern Carinthia in Austria, a left tributary of the Drava. Its drainage basin is 1,100.8 km^{2} (425.0 sq mi).

== Course ==
The river rises in the High Tauern range of the Central Eastern Alps on the Pasterze Glacier at the foot of the Grossglockner, the highest mountain in Austria. It discharges after flowing for a little over 84 km (52 mi) near Möllbrücke into the Drava. At the beginning of its course, at the southeastern end of the Pasterze Glacier, it is impounded to form the Margaritze Reservoir, from where part of the water is diverted via pressure tunnels across the Alpine crest and Mt. Wiesbachhorn to the reservoirs of the Verbund hydroelectric power plant in Kaprun, Salzburg.

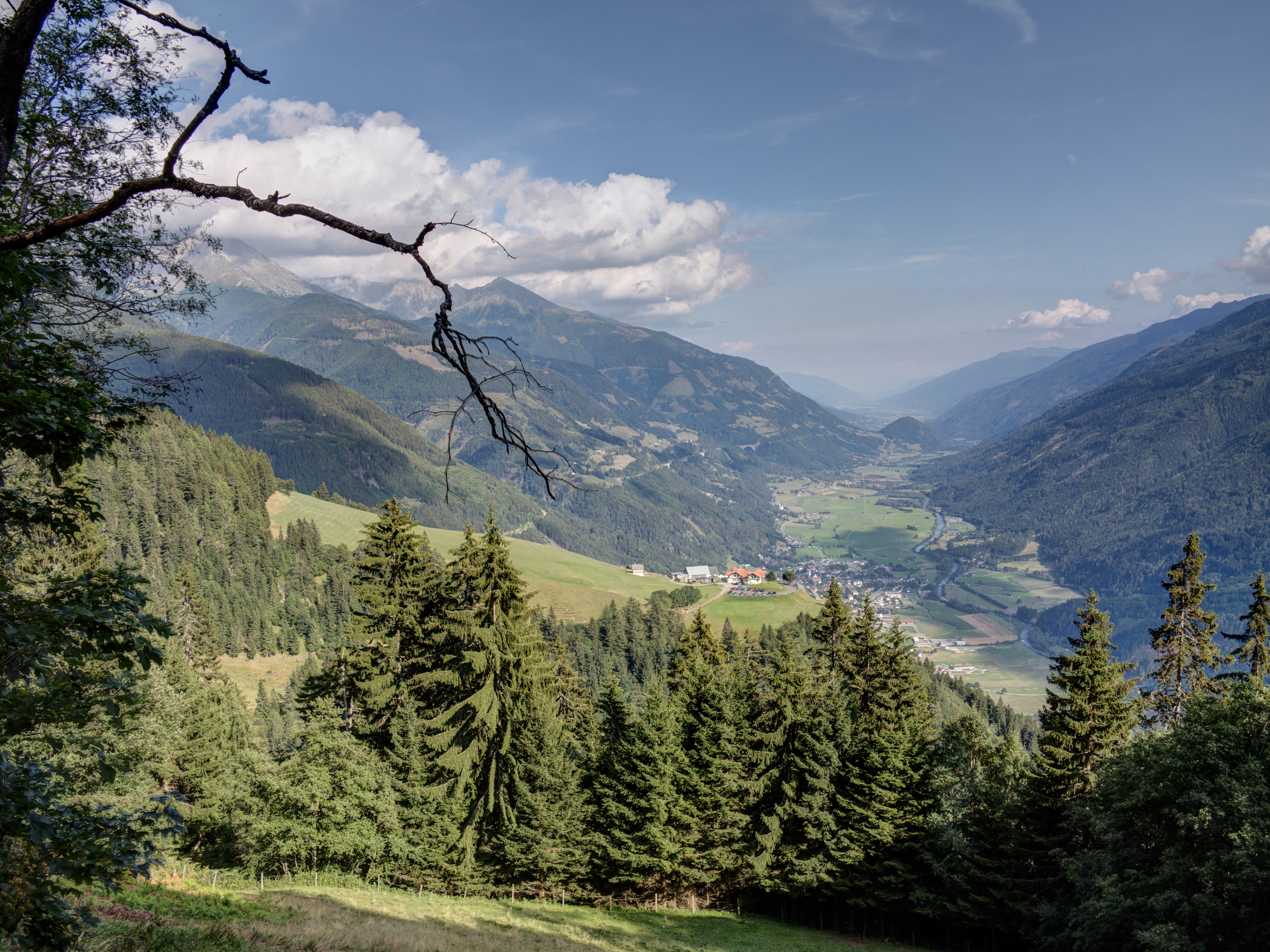
Möll valley near Obervellach

The Möll then runs down to Heiligenblut, parallel to the Grossglockner High Alpine Road, and further southwards, separating the mountains of the Schober Group in the west from the Goldberg Group in the east. In the municipality of Winklern, near the border with Tyrol (East Tyrol) at Iselsberg Pass, it turns eastwards, running through the broad lower part of the Möll Valley (German: Mölltal) along the northern rim of the Kreuzeck Group.

Downstream near Stall, the Möll waters are again impounded into the Gößnitz Reservoir. At Obervellach the river course is joined by the parallel Tauern Railway line descending from Mallnitz and the southern Tauern Tunnel portal. Near Kolbnitz and its confluence with the Drava, the Möll is once again dammed up to create the Rottau equalizing basin. From here some of the water is diverted to the lower stage of the Malta-Reisseck Power Plant in Möllbrücke.

The Möll is a popular kayak white water river and one of the preferred rafting rivers in Carinthia.

== Gallery ==
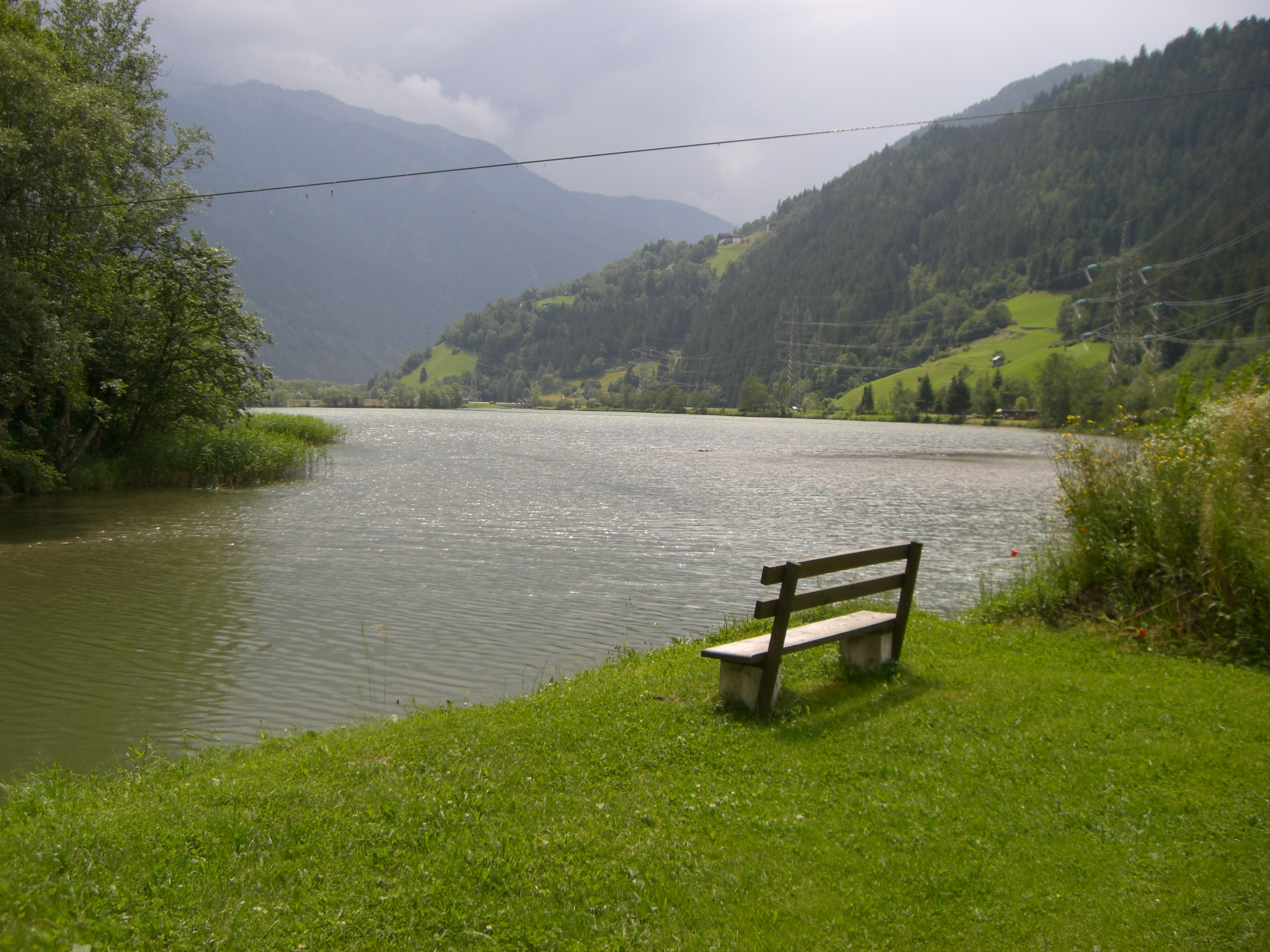
Gößnitz Reservoir

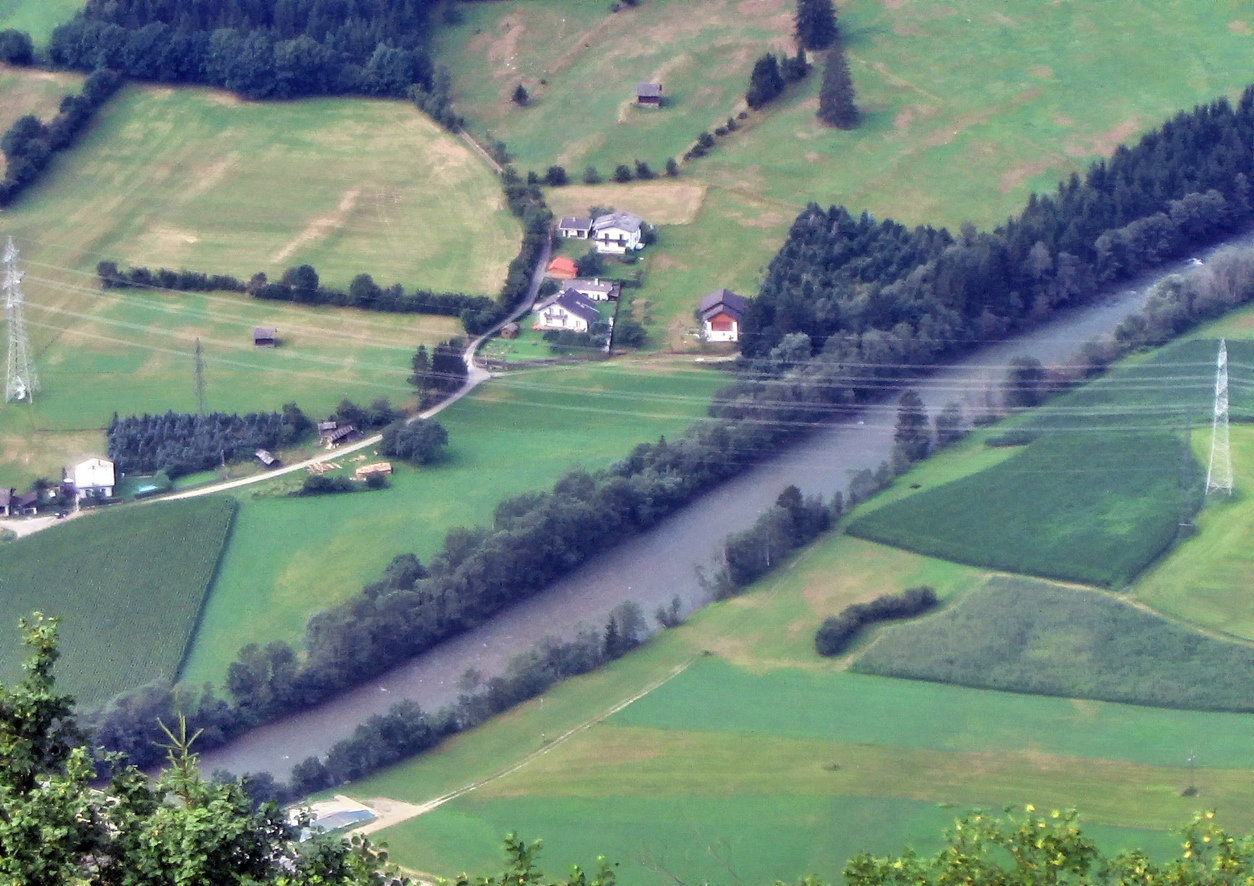
Möll near Penk, seen from the Zwenberg

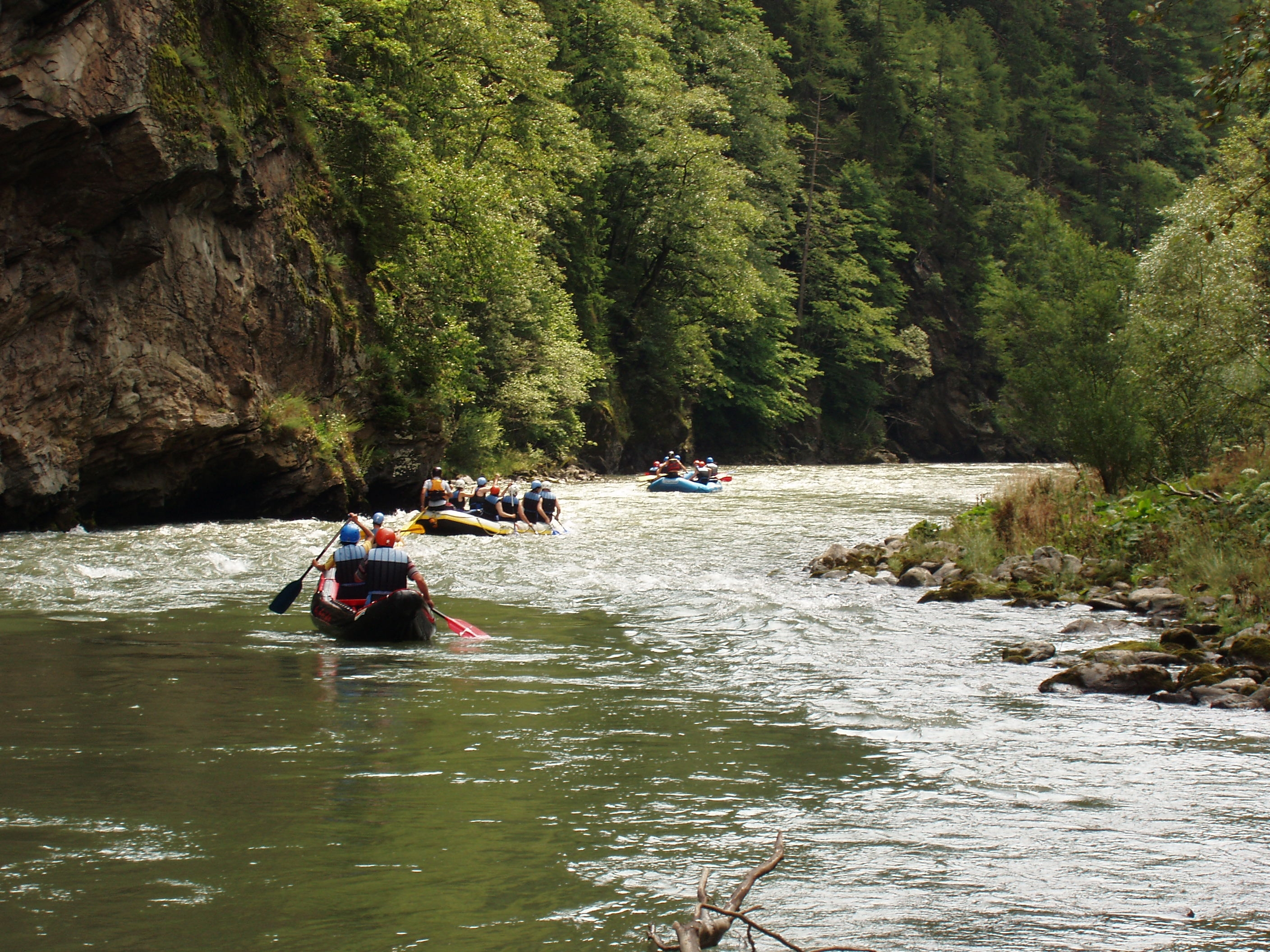
Rafting near Napplach

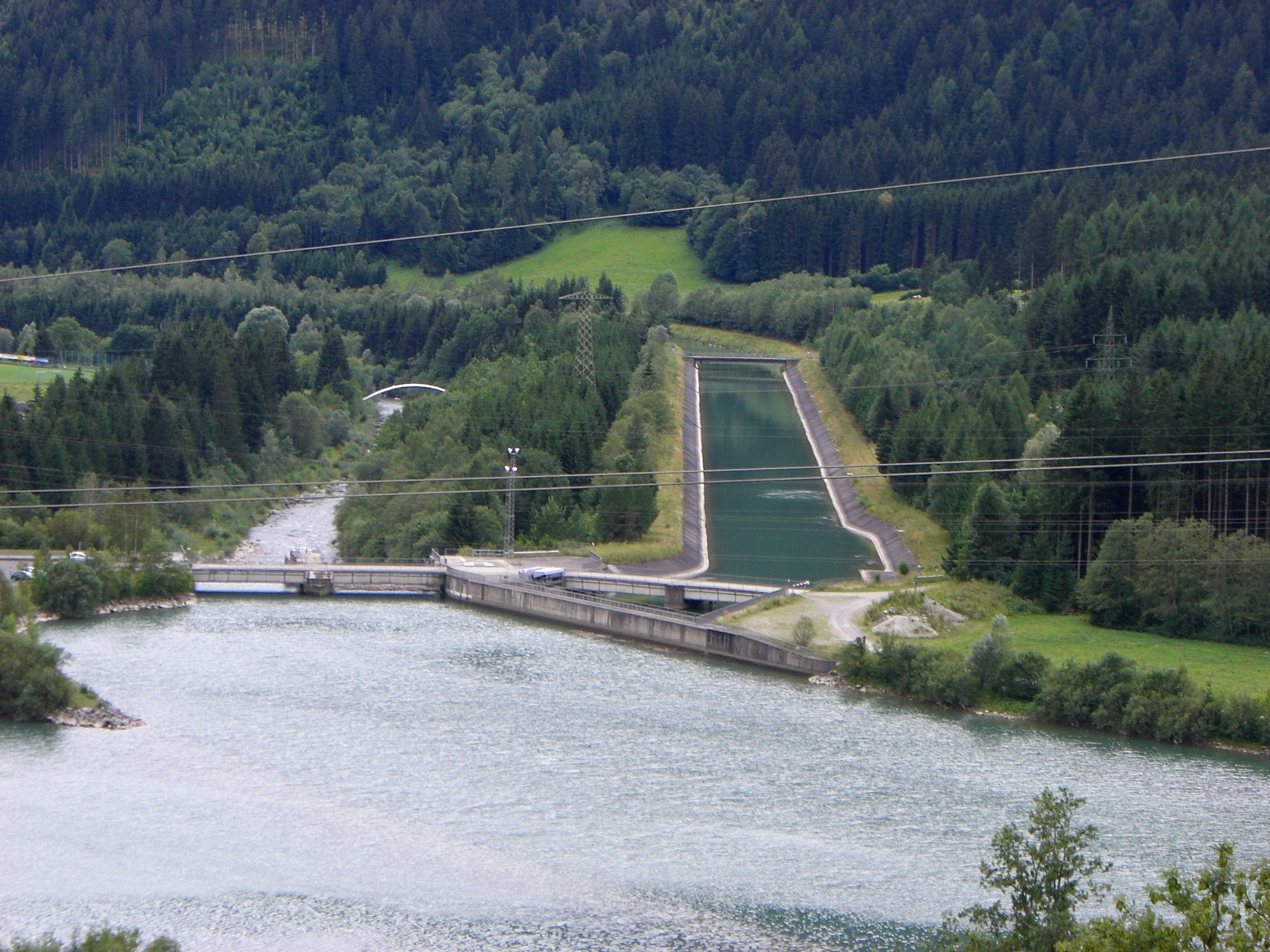
Rottau equalizing basin. Right: the Oberwasser channel, that leads to Möll Valley Power Station. Left: the natural river bed though which only a fraction of the water flows.

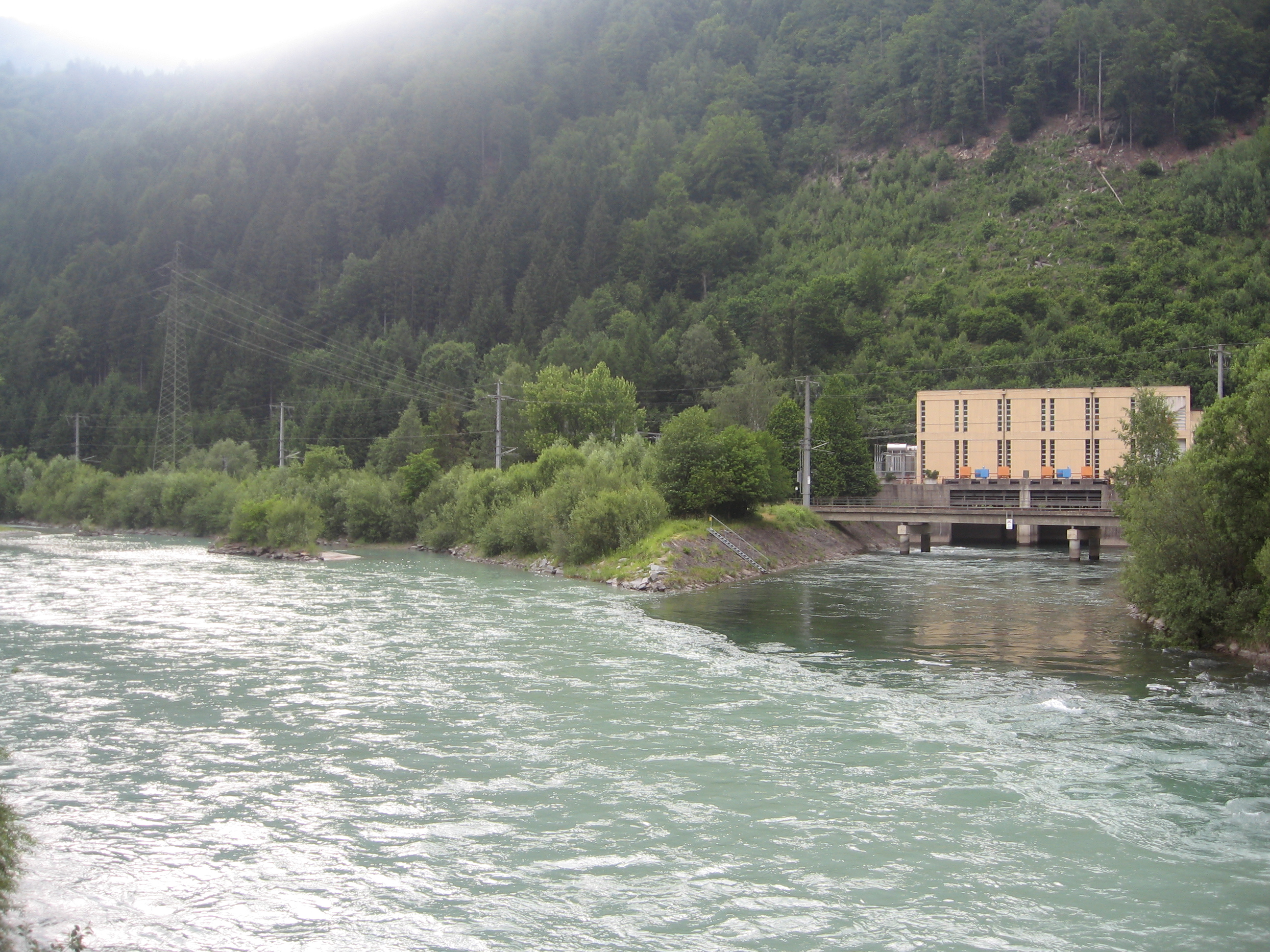
Möll Valley Power Station. The water now empties into the Drau before the actual mouth of the Möll (left).
