= Kreuzeck group =

Mountain range in Austria

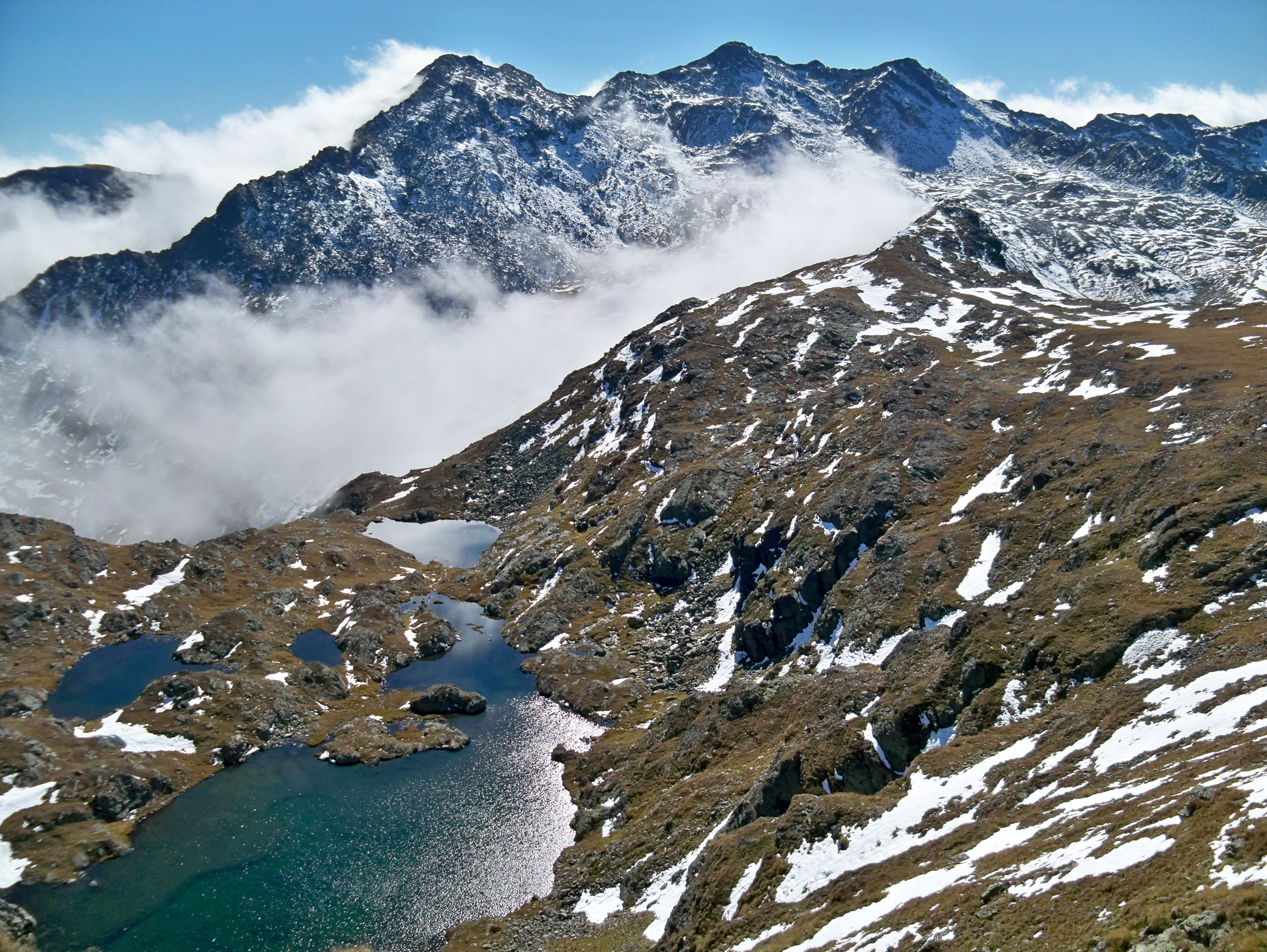
- Fourteen Lakes and Mt. Hochkreuz, 2,709 m (8,888 ft)

Highest point
- Peak: Mölltaler Polinik
- Elevation: 2,784 m (9,134 ft)
- Coordinates: 46°53′46″N 13°09′24″E

Geography
- Location within Austria
- Country: Austria
- State: Carinthia
- Parent range: Central Eastern Alps; Western Tauern Alps; High Tauern

Geology
- Rock type(s): Gneiss, schist

The Kreuzeck Group is a mountain range of the Central Eastern Alps. It may be considered either a separate range or part of the larger High Tauern chain. Administratively, the range belongs to the Austrian states of Carinthia and, in the westernmost part, Tyrol (i.e. East Tyrol).

== Geography ==
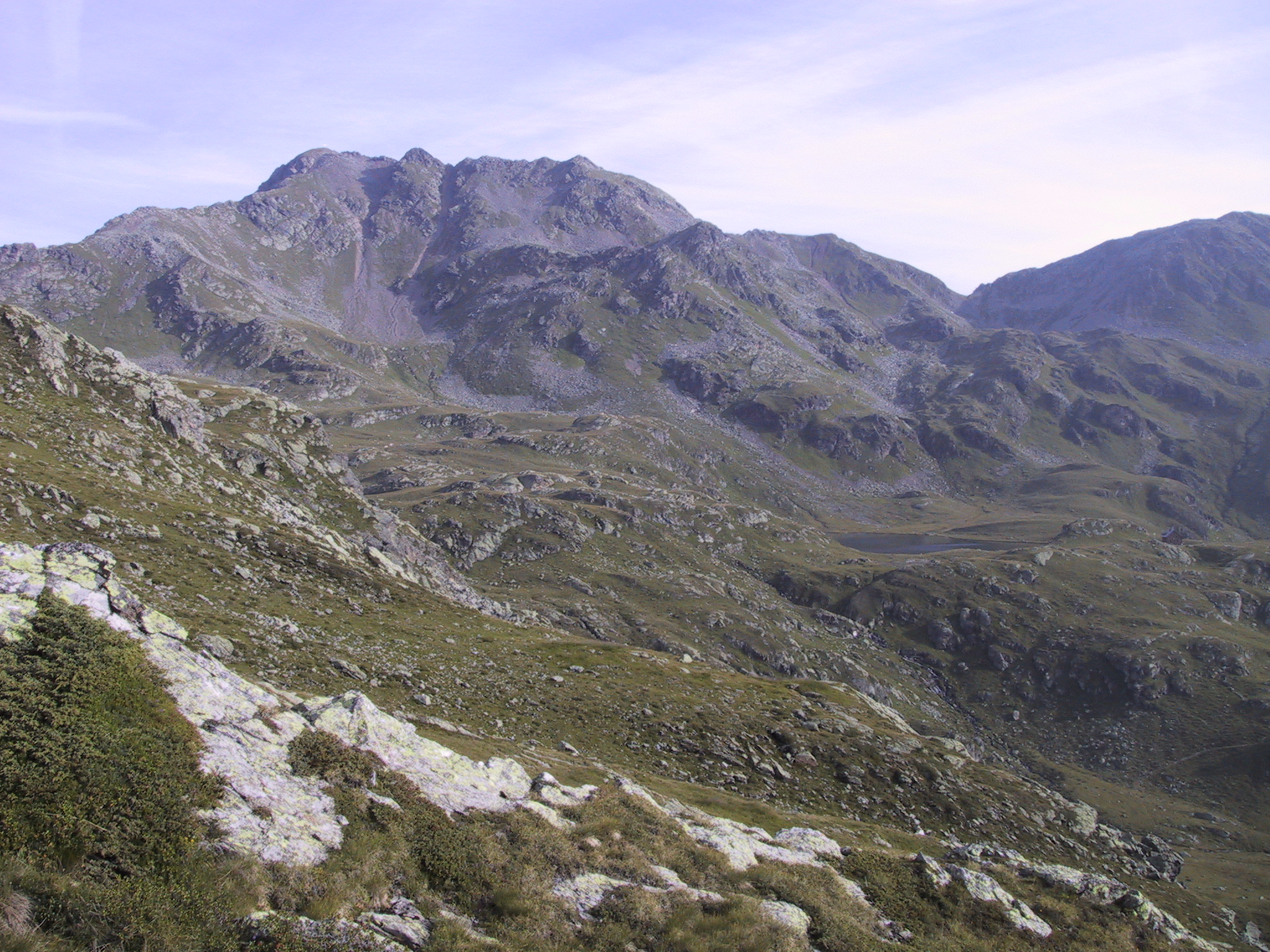
Kreuzeck summit

The Kreuzeck Group is geographically separated from the main chain of the High Tauern in the north by the Möll, a left tributary of the Drava, up to the confluence within the Lurnfeld basin in the east. In the south, the Drava forms the border with the Gailtal Alps, part of the Southern Limestone Alps. The Iselsberg Pass near Lienz, connecting the Drava and Möll valleys, marks the western end.

The range is mainly composed of gneiss and garnet-mica-schists. The mountainous area (approximately 450 km^{2}) is sparsely populated and used mainly for forestry and hunting. However, its tourism industry has improved in recent years. The area of the Reißeck municipality in the Möll valley is the site of the Reißeck-Kreuzeck hydroelectric power plant run by the Austrian Verbund company, whereby water is collected in several reservoirs in the Kreuzeck range.

Though named after Mt. Kreuzeck (2,701 m or 8,862 ft), the highest peaks of the range are the Mölltaler Polinik (2,784 m or 9,134 ft), Striedenkopf (2,749 m or 9,019 ft), and Hochkreuz (2,709 m or 8,888 ft).

== Classification ==
According to the Alpine Club classification of the Eastern Alps, the Kreuzeck group (AVE 43) together with the Rieserferner group, the Villgraten Mountains (Defereggen) and the Schober group forms the southern front of the High Tauern ranges, a section of the Alpine divide.

According to the 2005 SOIUSA (International Standardized Mountain Subdivision of the Alps) proposal, the Kreuzeck group (II/A-17.IV.) is a subsection of the Western Tauern Alps.

== Literature ==
- Manfred Posch: Reißeck, Kreuzeck. Die schönsten Touren, Klagenfurt 2000, Kärntner Druck- und Verlagsgesellschaft m.b.H., ISBN 3-85391-176-5
- Rudolf Gritsch : Kleiner Führer Kreuzeck-, Reißeck- und Sadniggruppe. Rother-Verlag, Munich, 1977, ISBN 978-3763332434
