= Obervellach =

Place in Carinthia, Austria

- Municipality
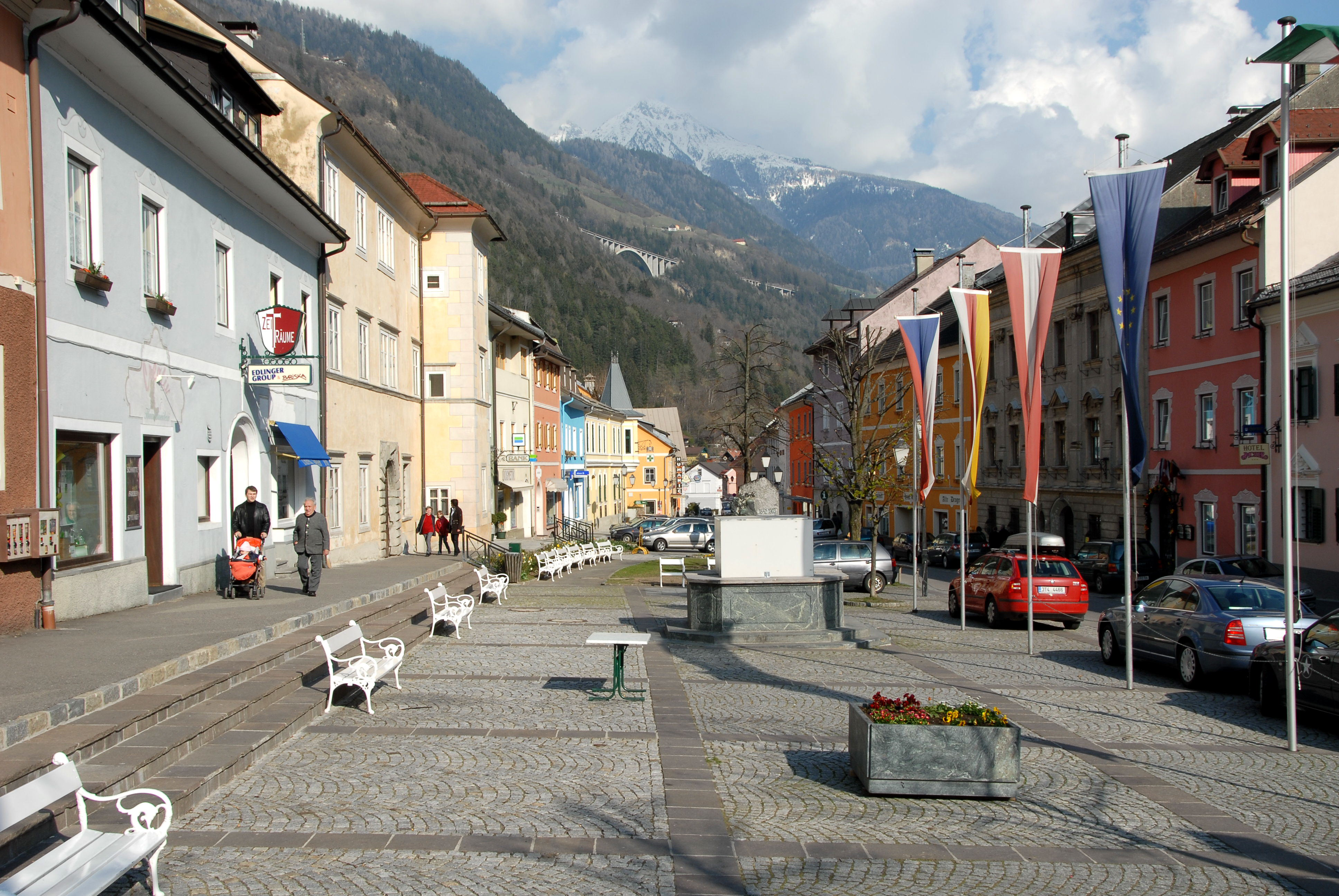
- Main square

- Coat of arms

- Location within Austria
- Coordinates: 46°55′N 13°12′E
- Country: Austria
- State: Carinthia
- District: Spittal an der Drau

Government
  - Mayor: Arnold Klammer (SPÖ)

Area
  - Total: 104.42 km^{2} (40.32 sq mi)
- Elevation: 690 m (2,260 ft)

Population (2018-01-01)
  - Total: 2,201
  - Density: 21.08/km^{2} (54.59/sq mi)
- Time zone: UTC+1 (CET)
  - Summer (DST): UTC+2 (CEST)
- Postal code: 9821
- Area code: 04782
- Website: www.obervellach.at

Obervellach is a market town in the district of Spittal an der Drau, in the Austrian state of Carinthia.

== Geography ==
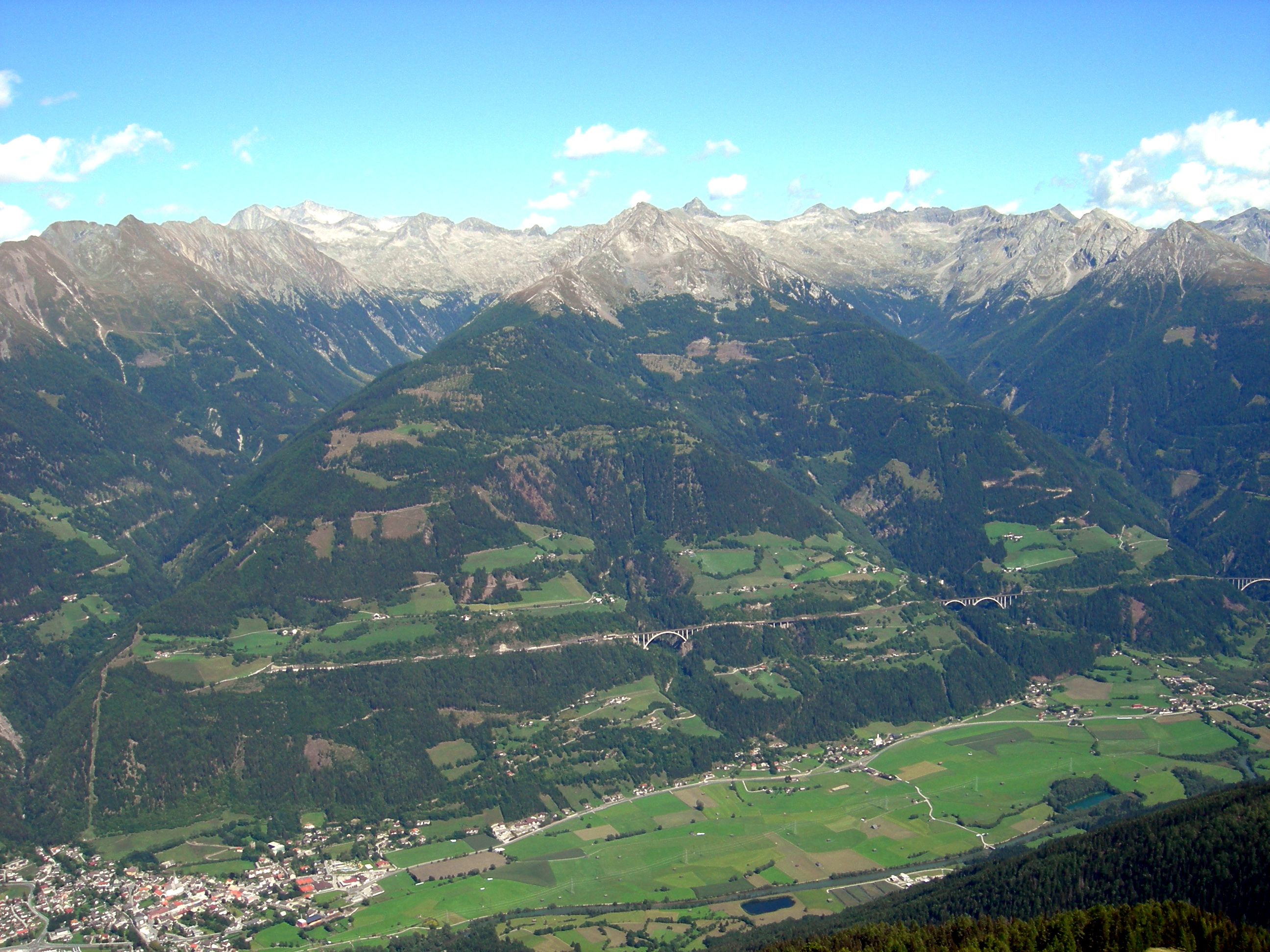
Möll Valley with Obervellach (left) and Tauern Railway line

The town is situated in the valley of the Möll river, on the southern slope of the High Tauern mountain range, where the Tauern Railway line descends from neighbouring Mallnitz and the southern Tauern Tunnel portal. The municipal area comprises the cadastral communities of Obervellach proper, Pfaffenberg, Lassach, and Söbriach.

== History ==
The settlement of Velach was first mentioned in a 10th-century deed issued by the Bishop Abraham of Freising (d. 993/94), a Bavarian missionary among the East Alpine Slavs in the Duchy of Carinthia (former Carantania), known for the Slovene Freising manuscripts. The name is probably derived from Slavic bela ("white"). The local church was mentioned as 'Freising basilica' in 1072, it later became the seat of a deanery of the Salzburg archbishops.

The traditional gold and silver mining area from the 12th century onwards was a possession of the comital House of Gorizia (Görz); in 1164 their ministeriales took their residence at Falkenstein Castle high above the valley. The Counts of Gorizia also held nearby Groppenstein Castle, first mentioned in 1254. Obervellach market rights were attested in 1256. After an armed conflict over the inheritance of late Count Ulrich II of Celje, in which the Count Leonhard of Gorizia and his brother John II were defeated by the forces of Emperor Frederick III, the area of Obervellach in 1460 finally was incorporated into the Inner Austrian possessions of the ruling House of Habsburg.

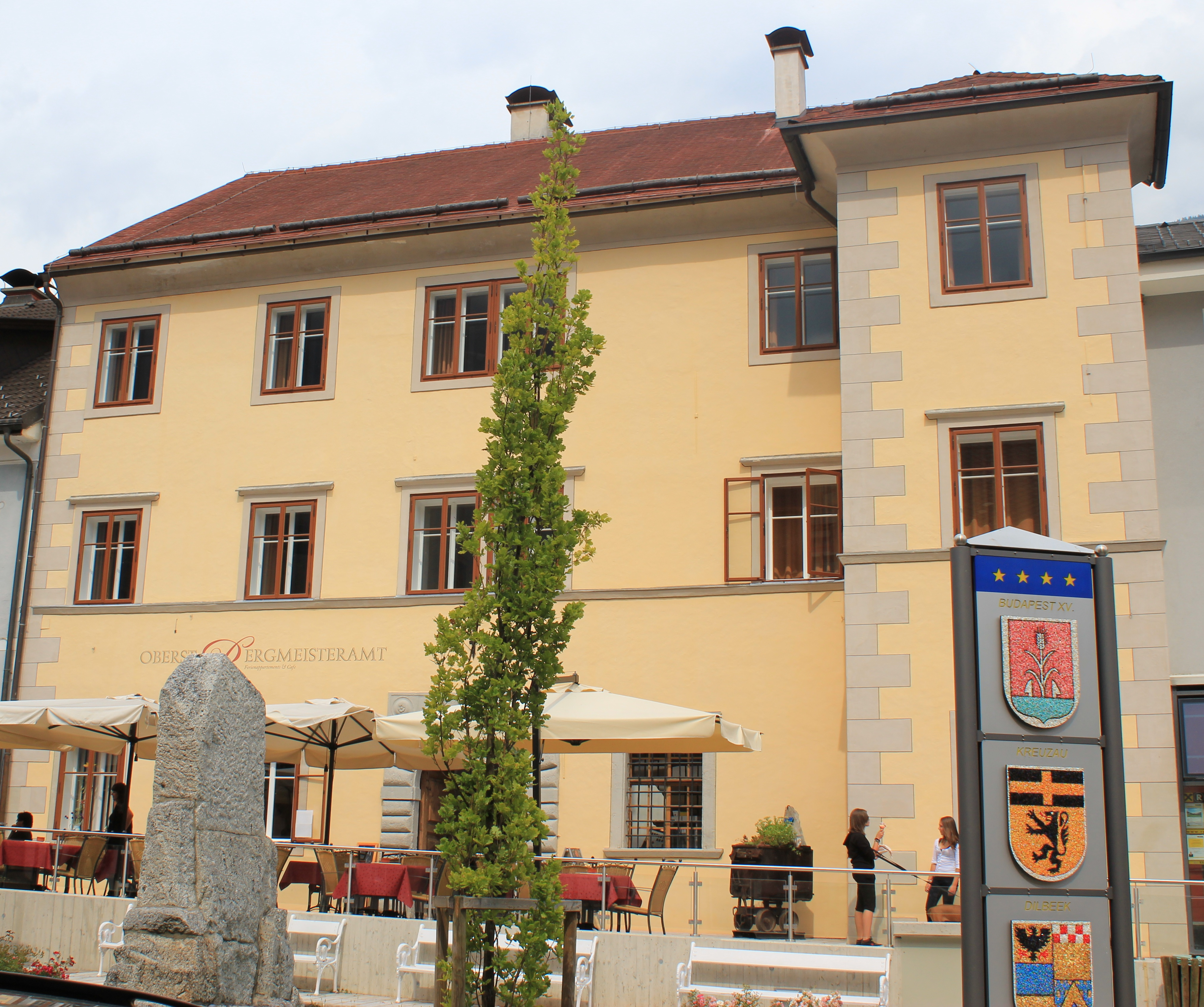
Mining authority building

The town remained an important mining area; the Habsburg emperor Maximilian I himself confirmed the market rights and in 1509 decided on Obervellach as the seat of the Inner Austrian mining authority (Oberbergmeisteramt). The present-day Late Gothic church building was built around 1500, it was consecrated by Bishop Berthold of Chiemsee. A notable Renaissance altar was installed about 1520 at the behest of the Imperial captain Christoph Frankopan (Frangipani), brother-in-law of the Salzburg prince-archbishop Matthäus Lang von Wellenburg; it includes several pieces by the Dutch painter Jan van Scorel (1495–1562).

In the 17th century, gold and silver deposits were progressively depleted, they were replaced by new copper mines. When the travel writer Joseph Kyselak toured the region in 1825, he found Obervellach a still prosperous town. The Obervellach municipality was established in 1849, it then also comprised neighbouring Mallnitz, Flattach, and the cadastral community of Penk (part of the Reißeck municipality since 1973), which all became independent in 1896.

The Tauern Railway line was inaugurated in 1909, with a station near the village of Kaponig high above the Obervellach centre, which was accessible by a cable car until 1975. The station was finally closed in 1999, today trains stop at the Tauernschleuse car shuttle station in Mallnitz (Mallnitz-Obervellach).

== Landmarks ==
- Parish church St. Martin with the Frangipani-altar
- pilgrimagechurch Maria Tax in Stallhofen with Stampfer-Kapelle
- Trabuschgen castle
- former courthouse (Oberstbergmeisteramt, Mainsquare Nr. 58)
- Groppenstein castle
- Groppensteinravine
- castle ruins Oberfalkenstein
- Falkenstein castle

== Politics ==
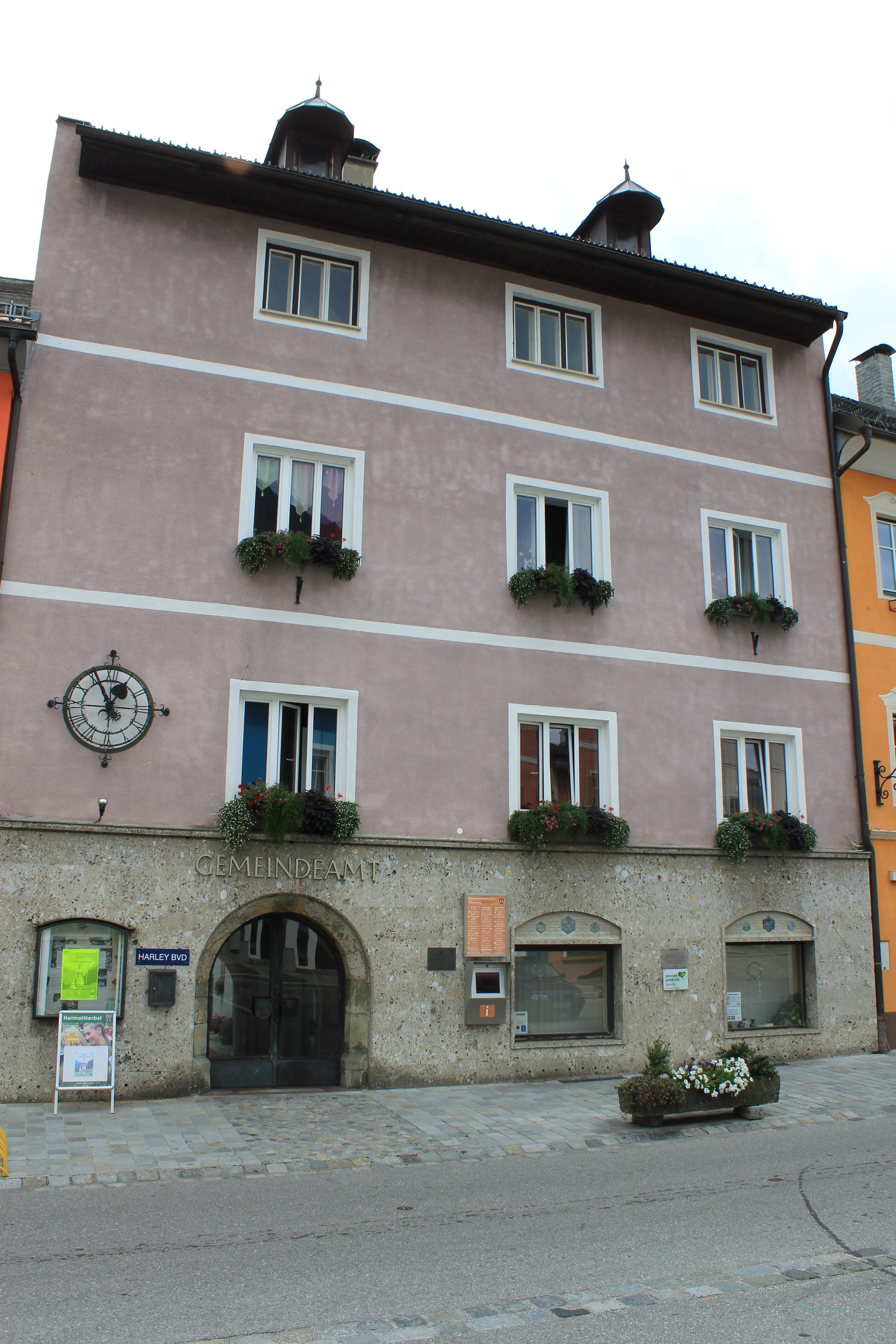
Town hall

Seats in the municipal assembly (Gemeinderat) as of 2015 local elections:

- Austrian People's Party (ÖVP): 7
- Mut für Obervellach (independent): 7
- Social Democratic Party of Austria (SPÖ): 3
- Freedom Party of Austria (FPÖ): 2

== Twin towns ==
Obervellach is twinned with:

- Freising, Germany, since 1963
- Dilbeek, Belgium, since 1973
- Seltz, France, since 1979
- Muggia, Italy, since 1984
- Hemer, Germany, since 1985
- Kreuzau, Germany, since 1987
- 15th district of Budapest, Hungary, since 1997
- Škofja Loka, Slovenia, since 1997
