= Mallnitz =

- Municipality
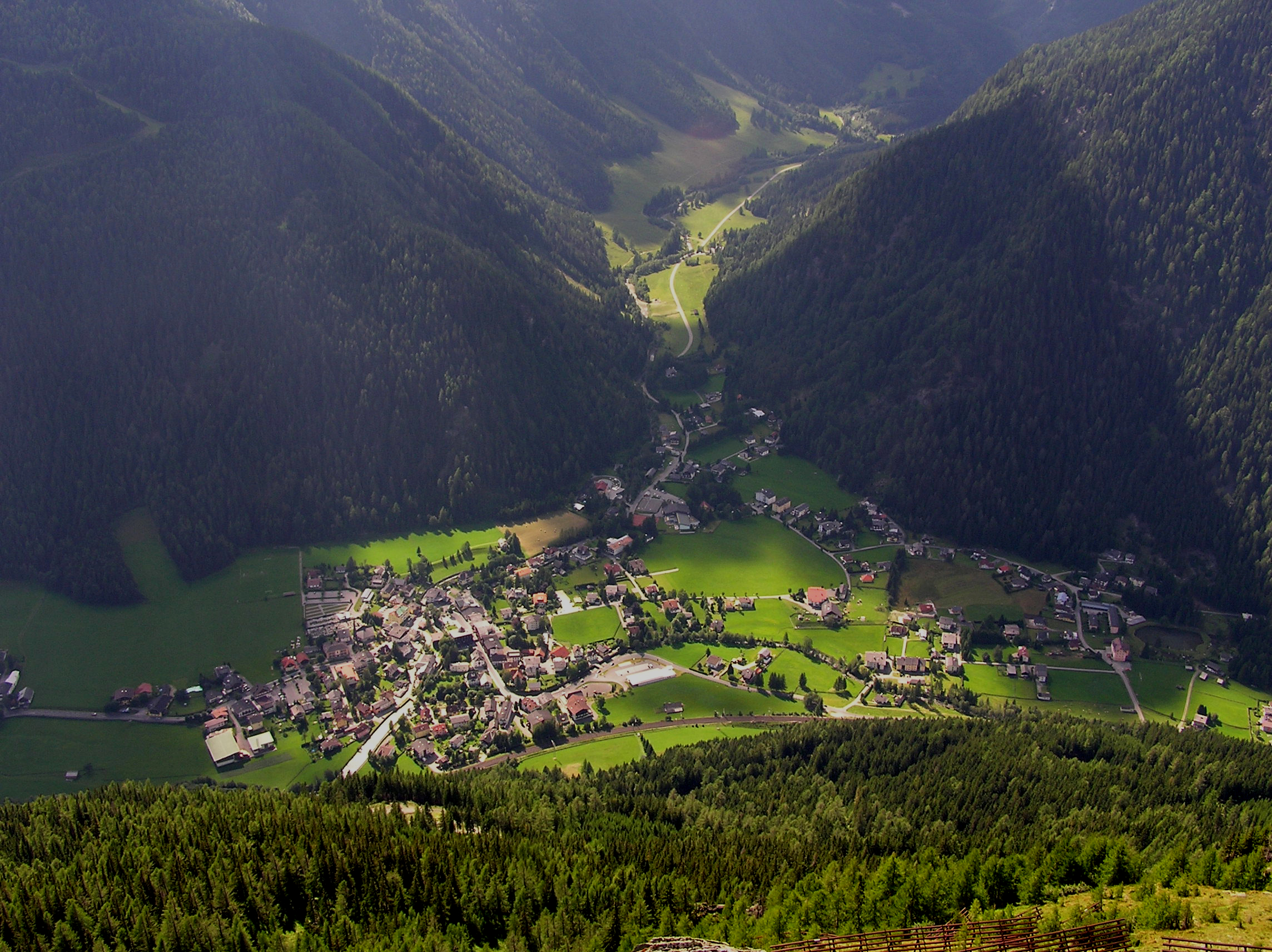
- Mallnitz Valley

- Coat of arms

- Location within Austria
- Coordinates: 46°59′N 13°10′E
- Country: Austria
- State: Carinthia
- District: Spittal an der Drau

Government
  - Mayor: Günther Novak (SPÖ)

Area
  - Total: 111.91 km^{2} (43.21 sq mi)
- Elevation: 1,191 m (3,907 ft)

Population (2018-01-01)
  - Total: 786
  - Density: 7.02/km^{2} (18.2/sq mi)
- Time zone: UTC+1 (CET)
  - Summer (DST): UTC+2 (CEST)
- Postal code: 9822
- Area code: 04784
- Website: www.mallnitz.gv.at

Mallnitz is a municipality in the Spittal an der Drau District in Carinthia, Austria.

== Geography ==
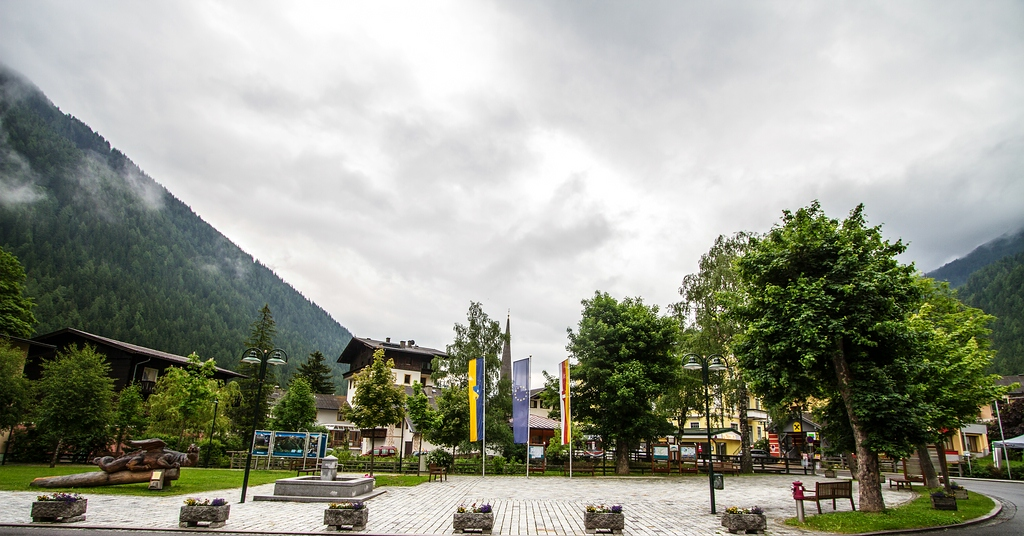
Main square

It is situated in a high valley of the Hohe Tauern mountain range stretching southwards down to Obervellach on the Möll river and separating the Ankogel Group in the east from the Goldberg Group in the west. In the north the Alpine crest marks the border with the Austrian state of Salzburg. At Mallnitz the Tauern Railway enters into the south portal of the Tauern Tunnel.

The municipal area consists of the cadastral communities of Mallnitz proper and Dösen. The northern parts belong to the High Tauern National Park territory.

== History ==
A trade route across the mountain passes to the Gastein Valley in the north may already existed in the Bronze Age. It was used by the Celts from about 400 BC, and when the area was incorporated into the Roman Noricum province about 15 BC, these bridle paths were rebuilt as a Roman road. A first settlement on the ancient route was probably established during the Slavic settlement of the Eastern Alps from about 600 onwards; the locality of Malinica, however, was not mentioned before 1299. The surrounding estates around Falkenstein Castle then were held by the Imperial Counts of Görz residing at Lienz.

Throughout the Middle Ages, Mallnitz was a strategically-important outpost on the trade route to Salzburg, especially for the transport of salt and gold mined in the Hohe Tauern ranges. The present-day municipality was split from Obervellach in 1895. The local economy was decisively promoted by the building of the Tauern Tunnel from 1901 to 1907 and the inauguration of the Tauern Railway line in 1909. Car shuttle trains have passed through the tunnel to Mallnitz–Obervellach station since 1920.

== Politics ==
Seats in the municipal assembly (Gemeinderat) as of 2015 local elections:

- Gemeinsam für Mallnitz (Independent): 6
- Social Democratic Party of Austria (SPÖ): 5

== Twin town ==
Mallnitz is twinned with:

- Witten, Germany, since 1979
