= Falkenstein Castle (Niederfalkenstein) =

Castle in Carinthia, Austria

Coordinates: 46°55′20″N 13°14′25″E

Niederfalkenstein Castle Burg Niederfalkenstein
- Obervellach, Carinthia, Austria
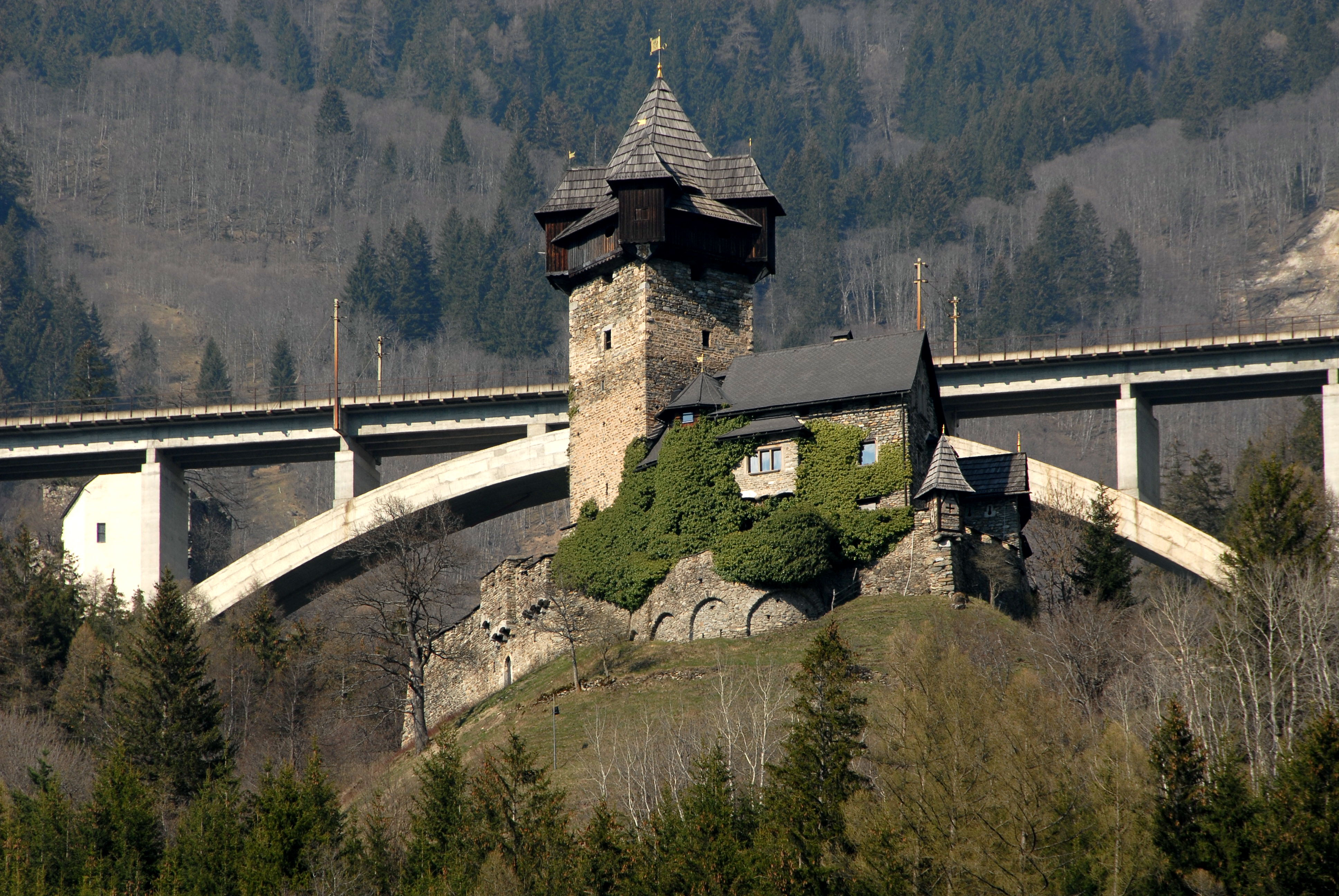
- Niederfalkenstein Castle and Falkenstein Bridge

Site information
- Type: Spur castle
- Owner: Private
- Open to the public: Yes
- Condition: Preserved

Site history
- Built: 12th century
- Built by: Lords of Falkenstein

Niederfalkenstein Castle is a medieval castle near Obervellach in Carinthia, Austria. It is part of the larger Falkenstein fortification complex; while the main fortress of Oberfalkenstein today is a ruin, the lower barbican of Niederfalkenstein is largely preserved.

== Location ==
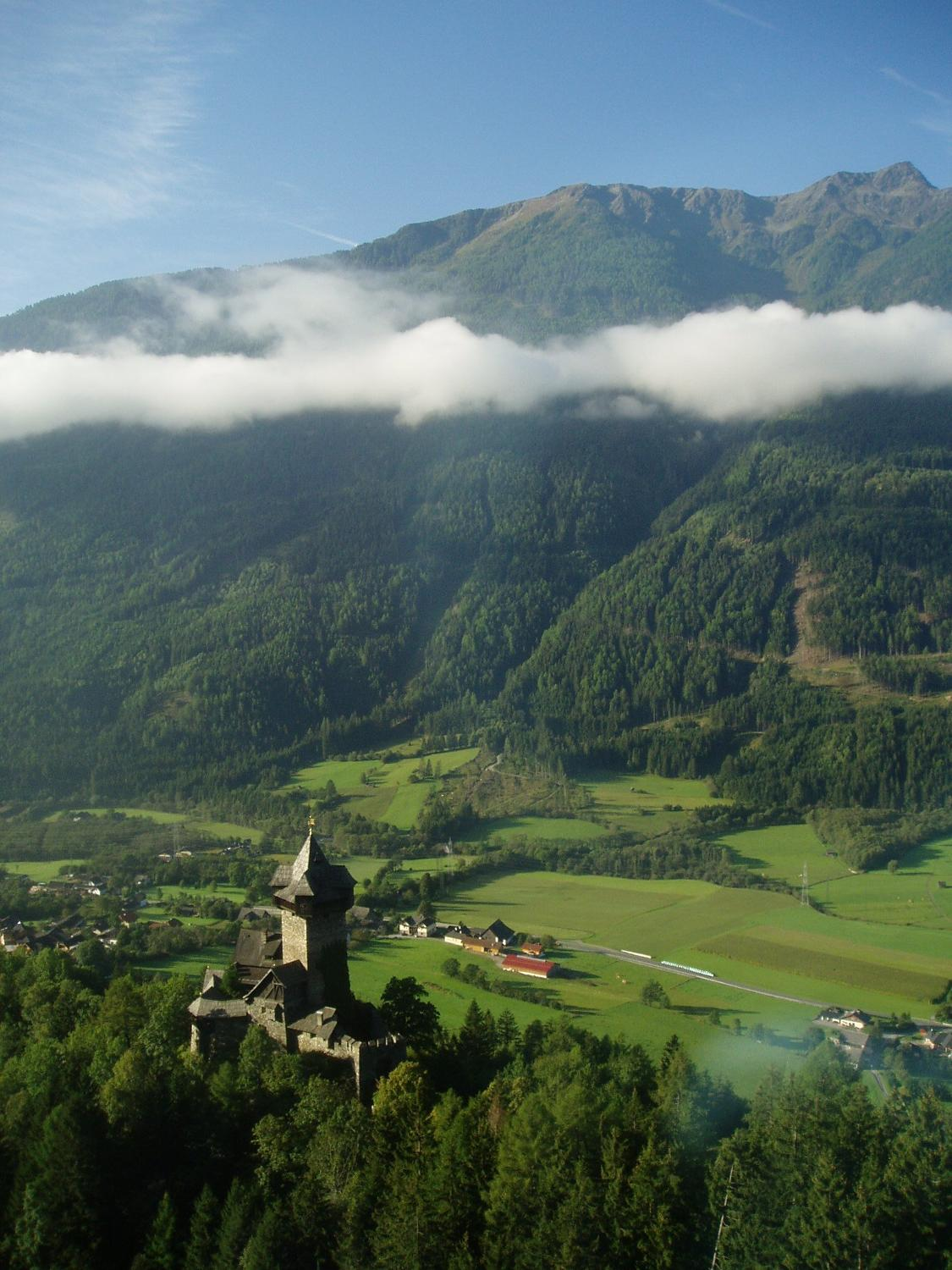
View from Tauern Railway line over Möll valley

The fortification was erected on a rocky promontory on the southwestern slopes of the Reisseck Group in the Hohe Tauern mountain range, overlooking the Möll valley east of Obervellach. Niederfalkenstein is 843 metres (2,766 ft) above sea level.

The Tauern Railway line, opened in 1909, initially passed under the rock in a 67-metre (220 ft) long tunnel. In the course of the double-tracked expansion carried out from 1971 to 1973, the rail tunnel was replaced by a wide arch bridge, the present-day Falkenstein Bridge passing between Ober- and Niederfalkenstein, with 396 metres (1,299 ft) the longest of the line and one of the longest in Austria.

The ruins of Oberfalkenstein comprise a Bergfried keep with surrounding moats and the foundations of a Romanesque palas. A chapel dedicated to John the Baptist was first mentioned in 1246, significantly enlarged in a Baroque style in 1772 and is still in use.

== History ==
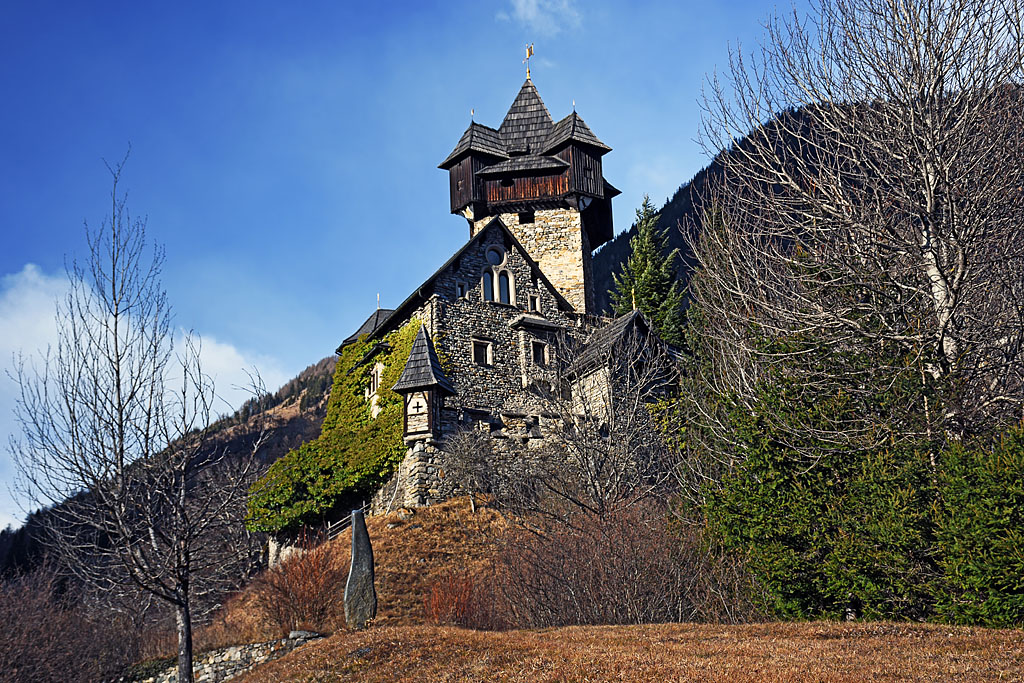
Niederfalkenstein

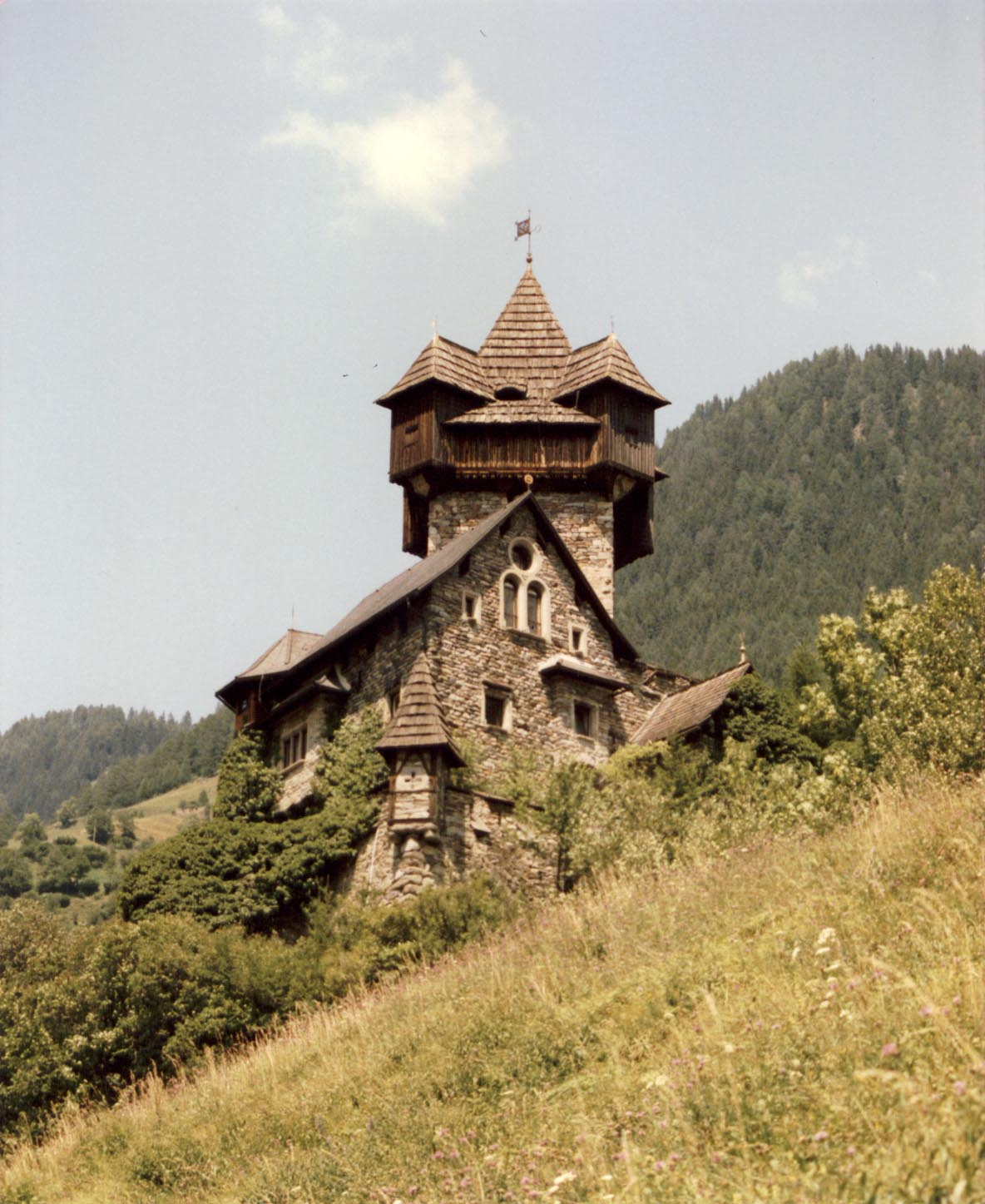
Niederfalkenstein Castle

The fortification was first mentioned as Valchenstain Castle in an 1164 deed. The name may be derived from Proto-Germanic walhaz (foreigner, stranger; Romance/Celtic-speaker) in terms of a Romance (Italian) settlement, referring to descendants of the former Roman city of Teurnia, who had migrated to the remote valley during the Slavic settlement of the Eastern Alps about 600.

The first documented ministerialis Gumpoldus de Valchenstein was a liensmen of Count Engelbert II of Gorizia (Görz), scion of the Meinhardiner dynasty. The Counts of Gorizia also held the office of a Vogt of the Benedictine Millstatt Abbey, and the Lord of Falkenstein established close ties to the monastery.

The Falkenstein dynasty became extinct about 1300, soon after two castles, 'Upper' and 'Lower' Falkenstein were mentioned, enfeoffed by the Counts of Gorizia to several local nobles. On 24 June 1394 Count Henry VI gave the upper castle in pawn to the Habsburg duke Albert III of Austria. It was finally seized by Albert's nephew Emperor Frederick III in 1460, after he had defeated Count John II of Gorizia in the conflict over the heritage of the extinct Counts of Celje. The lower castle was temporarily held by the Carinthian knight Andreas von Graben, who sold it in 1462.

In 1504 Frederick's son and successor Emperor Maximilian I again pawned the castle to Count Julian of Lodron, by his wife Apollonia brother-in-law of the Salzburg archbishop Matthäus Lang von Wellenburg. It was acquired by Apollonia's second husband Christoph Frankopan after Lodron's death in 1510. The countess donated an altarpiece by Jan van Scorel in the Obervellach parish church, depicting Saint Christopher, herself and her castle. At the same time, large funds had to be raised in order to restore the dilapidated premises. Afterwards, several nobles held the castle, among them the descendants of Gabriel von Salamanca-Ortenburg and the Khevenhüller dynasty, while the premises decayed. When the Austrian mountaineer Joseph Kyselak visited the site in 1825, it largely laid in ruins.

Rebuilt from 1905, the Unterfalkenstein palas burnt down after a burglary in 1969 and had to be restored again. Up to today the castle is a private property, but can be visited in summer.

== See also ==
- List of castles in Austria
