= ÖBB Class 1043 =

Austrian locomotive class

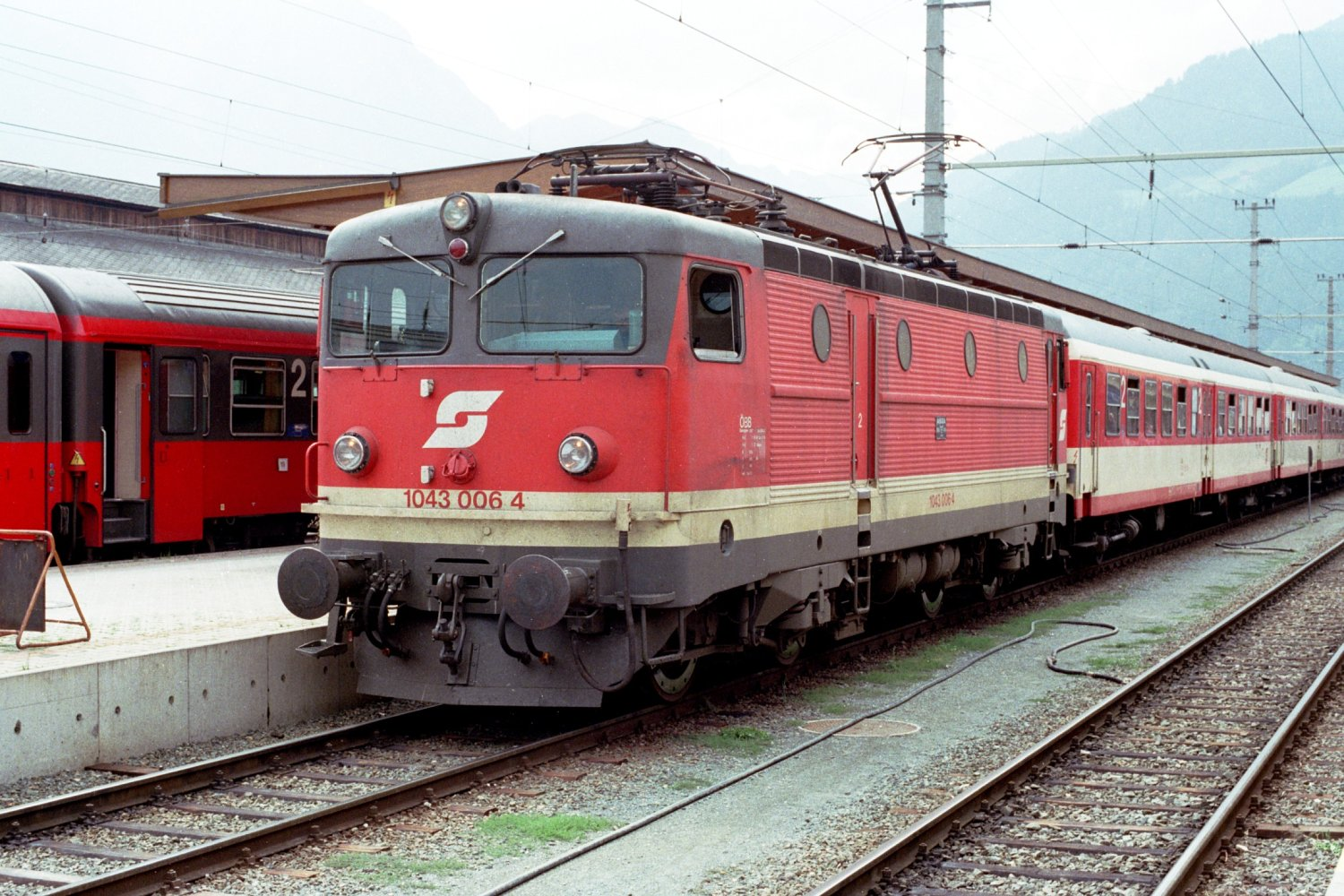
- ÖBB 1043.006 with a passenger train at Lienz, 1995.
Type and origin
- Power type: Electric
- Builder: ASEA
- Build date: 1971–1974
- Total produced: 10
Specifications
- Configuration
  - UIC: Bo′Bo′
- Gauge: 1,435 mm (4 ft 8 1/2 in)
- Length: 15,580 mm (51 ft 1 in)
- Loco weight: 1043.001–1043.003: 70 tonnes (154,300 lb); 1043.004–1043.010: 83 tonnes (183,000 lb)
- Electric system/s: 15 kV 16.7 Hz AC
- Current pickup(s): Overhead
Performance figures
- Maximum speed: 135 km/h (84 mph)
- Power output: 1043.001–1043.003: 3,600 kW (4,830 hp); 1043.004–1043.010: 4,000 kW (5,360 hp)
- Tractive effort: 1043.001–1043.003: 260 kN (58,450 lbf); 1043.004–1043.010: 274 kN (61,600 lbf)
Career
- Operators: ÖBB
- Numbers: 1043.001–010
- Locale: Austria

The ÖBB Class 1043 is a class of thyristor-controlled universal electric locomotives operated initially by ÖBB. The ten members of the class were derived from the Class Rc operated by the Swedish State Railways (SJ).

The locomotives were the first in Austria to use thyristors. After successful test runs on the Semmering and Tauern mountain railway lines, the first four members of the class built by ASEA entered service with the ÖBB in 1971 and in the beginning of 1972, and the remaining six followed after a short delay while other Rc2 were manufactured in 1973. The engines were used for passenger and freights services, mainly in the Austrian Alpine regions. One member of the class (1043.005) was subsequently withdrawn from service in 1999, due to irreparable accident damage.

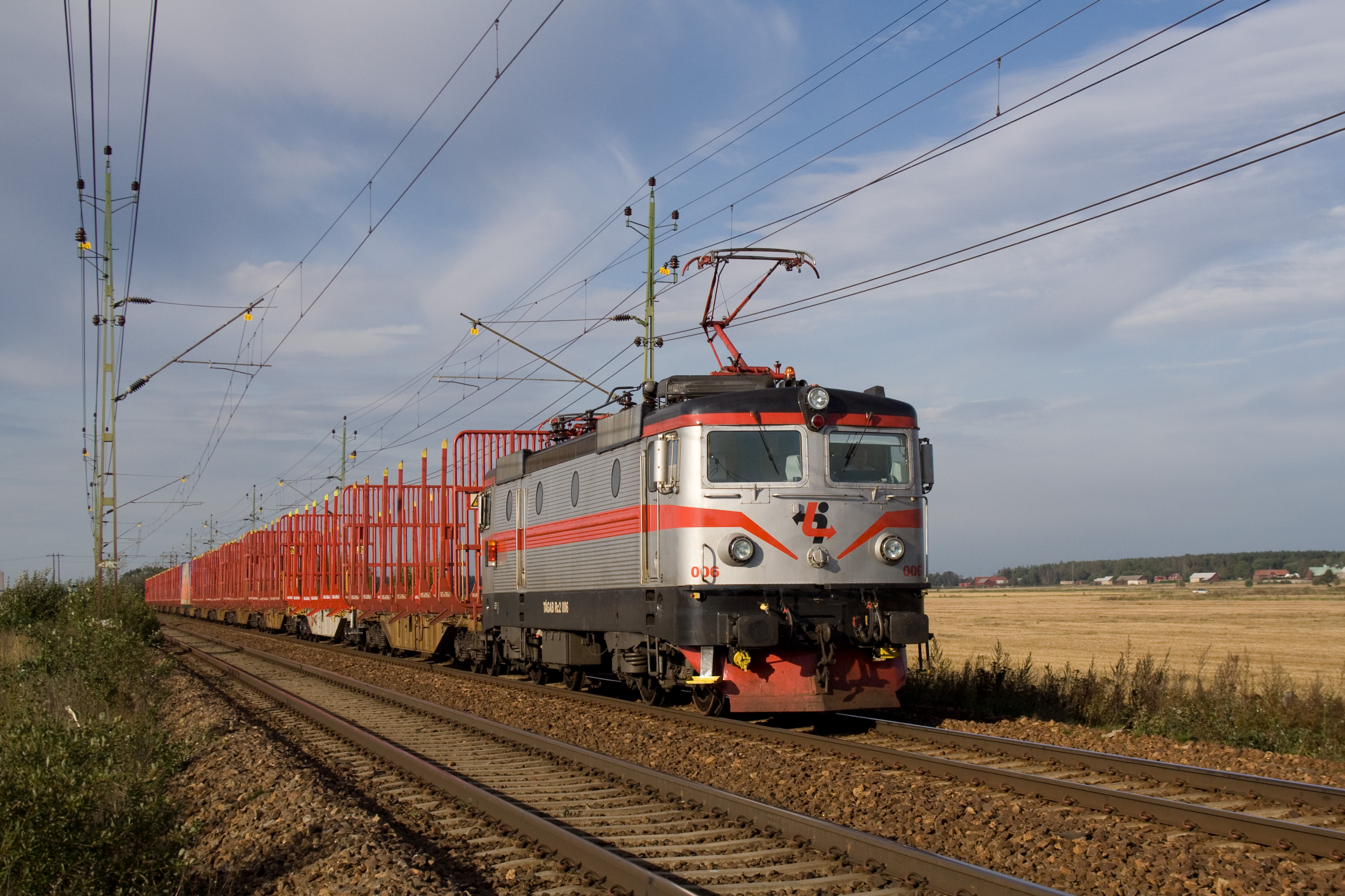
Tågab Rc2 006 freight train near Hallsberg, Sweden

The remaining nine units were sold in 2001 to TÅGAB and returned to Sweden as Tågab Rc2. The first three engines were purchased by the Swedish Rail Administration (Banverket ELL 0001R–0003R, today Infranord) by 2004; Tågab Rc2 004 was removed from service after a fire in 2008.

== See also ==
- Rail transport in Austria
