= Burgruine Falkenstein (Oberfalkenstein) =

Castle ruins in Austria

Coordinates: 46°55′20″N 13°14′25″E

Oberfalkenstein Castle
- Burg Oberfalkenstein
- Obervellach, Carinthia, Austria
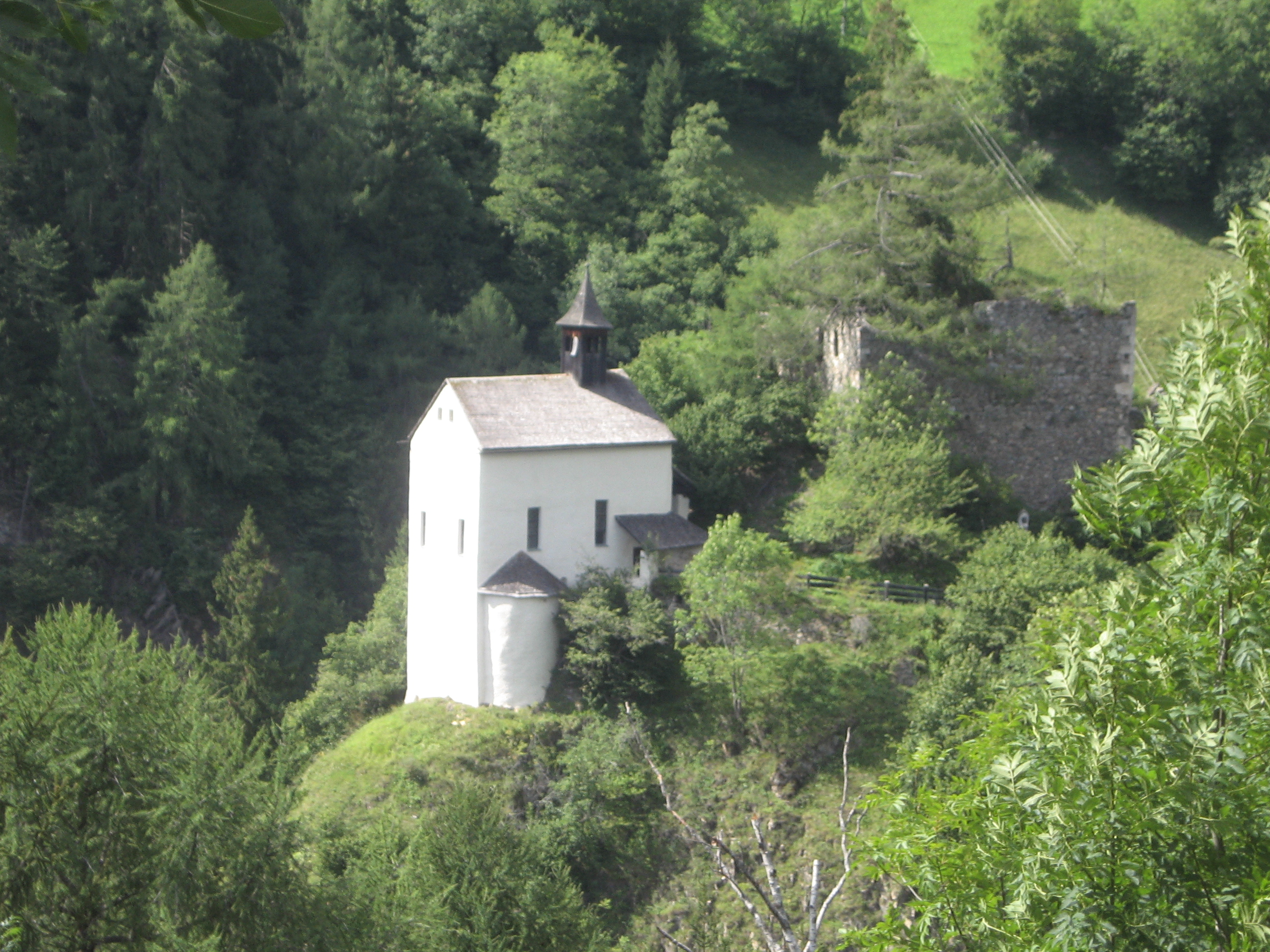
- Castle ruins with St John's chapel

Site information
- Type: Spur castle

Site history
- Built: 12th century

Falkenstein Castle (Oberfalkenstein) is a ruined medieval castle near Obervellach in Carinthia, Austria. It was built in the 12th century as part of a larger fortification complex comprising the preserved advanced work of Niederfalkenstein below.

== See also ==
- List of castles in Austria
