= Freising manuscripts =

Oldest document in Slovene

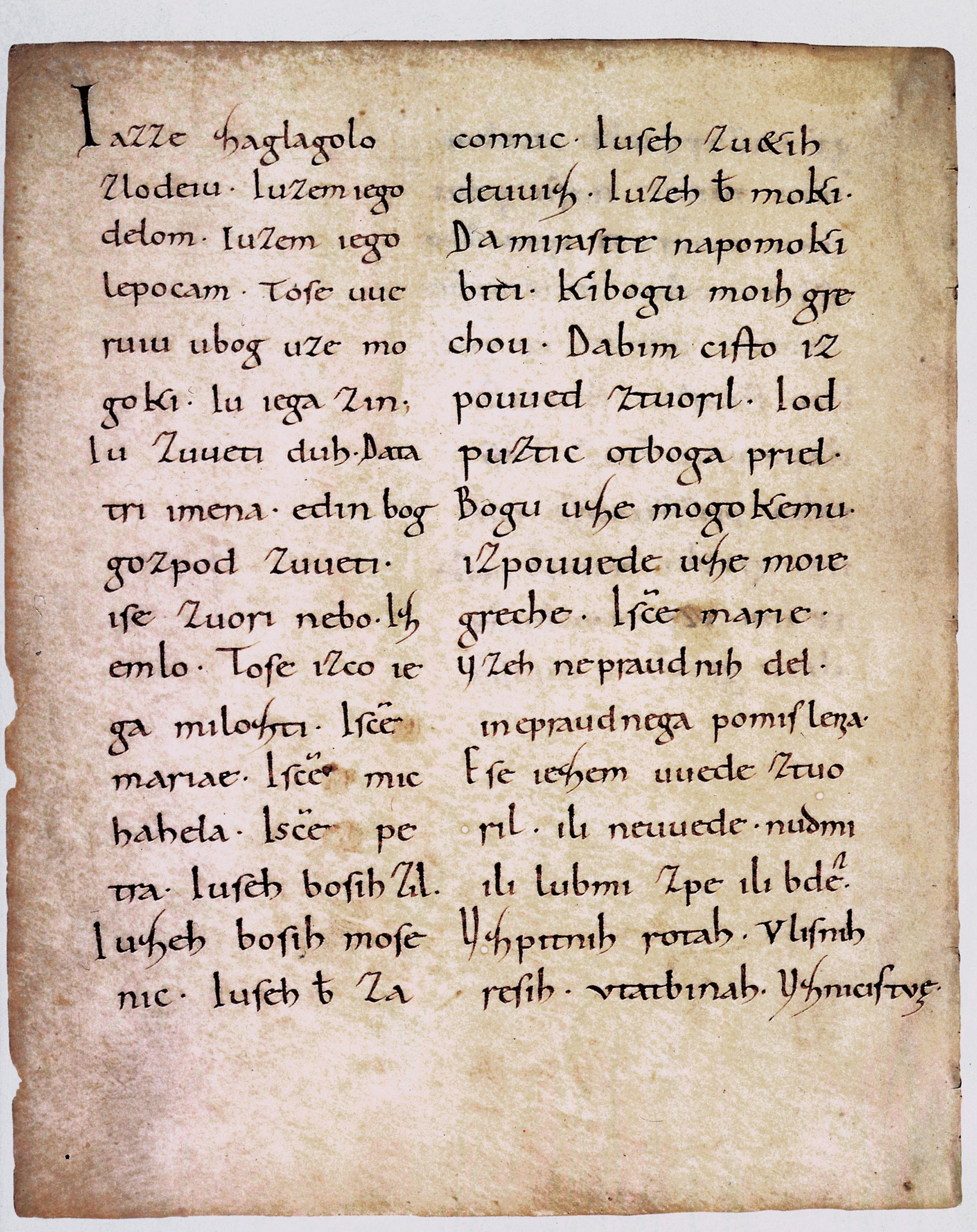
The beginning of the second Freising manuscript

The Freising manuscripts (Note: Also Freising folia, Freising fragments, or Freising monuments; German: Freisinger Denkmäler, Latin: Monumenta Frisingensia, Slovene: Brižinski spomeniki or Brižinski rokopisi.) are the first Latin-script continuous text in a Slavic language and the oldest document in Slovene.

== Description and origin ==
The manuscripts were found bound into a Latin codex (manuscript book). Four parchment leaves and a further quarter of a page have been preserved (i.e., folia 78, 158, 159, 160, and 161, comprising nine pages altogether). They consist of three texts in the oldest Slovene dialect. Linguistic, stylistic and contextual analyses reveal that these are church texts of careful composition and literary form.

The precise date of the origin of the Freising manuscripts cannot be exactly determined; the original text was probably written in the 9th century. In this liturgic and homiletic manuscript, three Slovene records were found and this miscellany was probably an episcopal manual (pontificals). The Freising manuscripts in it were created between 972 and 1039, most likely before 1000. The main support for this dating is the writing, which was used in the centuries after Charlemagne and is named Carolingian minuscule.

During the time of the writing of the two manuscripts (sermons on sin and repentance, a confessional form), Bishop Abraham was active (from 957 to 994) in Freising. It is believed that the manuscripts were written in the Möll Valley in Carinthia. For this reason some linguists (e.g. Jernej Kopitar and Rajko Nahtigal) linked Abraham closely to the origin of the Freising manuscripts and even attributed to him the authorship of one of the texts and suspected that he was of Slovene origin, although this was later disproven.

== Modern history ==
The manuscripts were discovered in Freising, Bavaria. The Slovene name Brižinski spomeniki (literally 'Brižinj Monuments') was coined by the Carinthian Slovene philologist Anton Janežič, who Slovenized the German name Freising to Brižinj in 1854. In 1803, the manuscript came to the Bavarian State Library in Munich and the Freising manuscripts were discovered there in 1807. The texts were translated into modern Slovene in 1854 by Anton Janežič. Before World War II, a facsimile of the Freising manuscripts was published by Silvester Škerl at Akademska založba (Academic Publisher) in Ljubljana.

== Exhibitions ==
The manuscripts are still kept at the Bavarian State Library in Munich and have left it only twice. In the 1970s, they were exhibited in the Vatican Museums. In May and June 2004, they were exhibited at the National and University Library in Ljubljana.

== See also ==
- Codex Suprasliensis

== Literature ==
- Richards, Ronald O. (2003). The Pannonian Slavic Dialect of the Common Slavic Proto-language: The View from Old Hungarian. Los Angeles: University of California. ISBN 9780974265308.
- Tóth, Imre H. (1996). "The Significance of the Freising Manuscripts (FM) for Slavic Studies in Hungary". Zbornik Brižinski spomeniki. Ljubljana: Slovenska akademija znanosti in umetnosti. pp. 443–448. ISBN 9788671311007.
