= Tauern Railway Tunnel =

Railway tunnel in Austria

Coordinates: 47°02′10″N 13°09′22″E

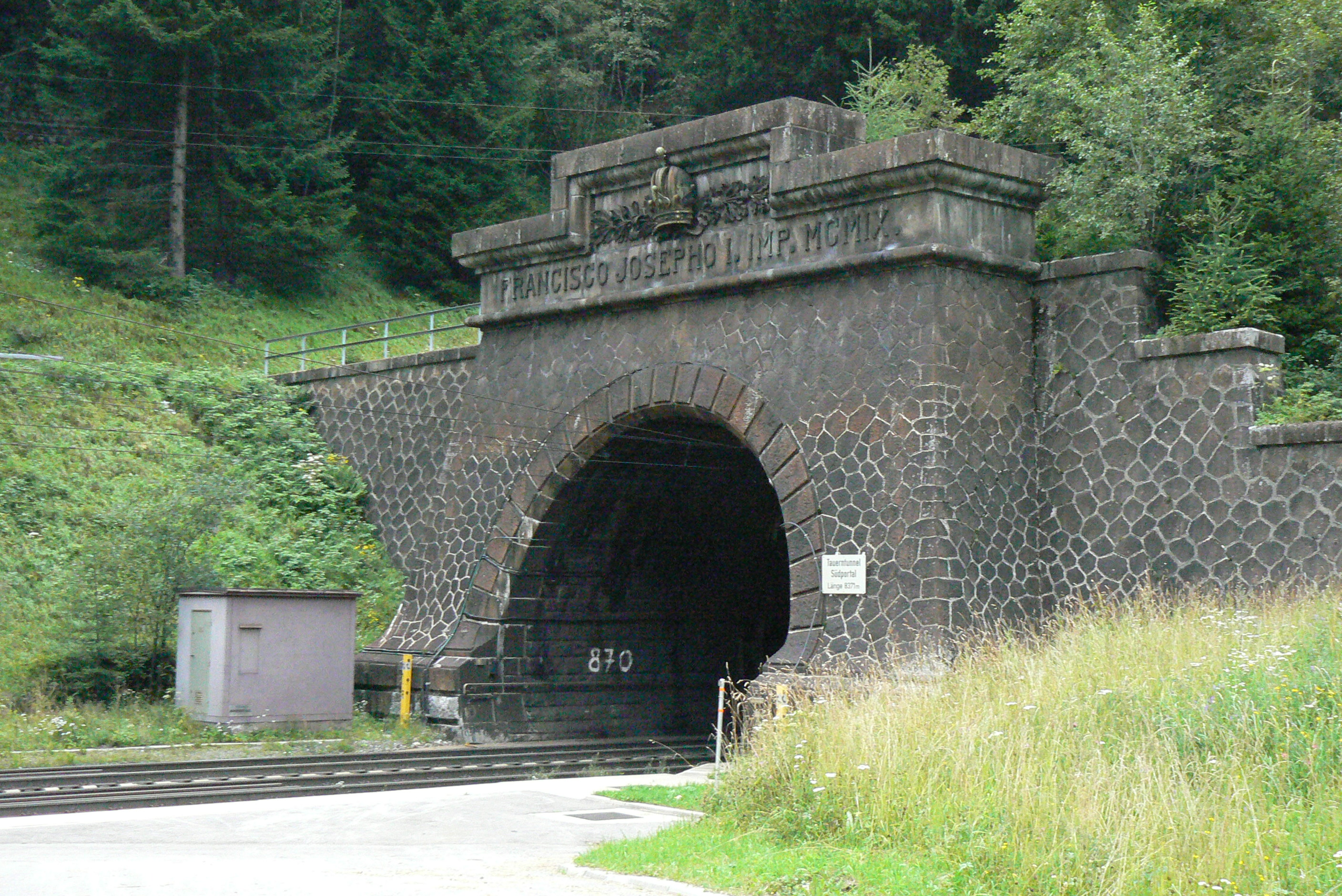
- South portal near Mallnitz
- Interactive map of Tauern Railway Tunnel

Overview
- Line: Tauern Railway
- Location: Hohe Tauern, Central Eastern Alps
- Start: Böckstein, Bad Gastein, Salzburg
- End: Mallnitz, Carinthia

Operation
- Work began: 1902
- Opened: 1909
- Operator: Austrian Federal Railways
- Traffic: Train

Technical
- Line length: 8,371 m (5.201 mi) (1909: 8,550 m (5.31 mi))
- No. of tracks: Double track
- Track gauge: 1,435 mm (4 ft 8 1/2 in) (standard gauge)
- Electrified: 15 kV/16.7 Hz AC Overhead line
- Max elevation: 1,226 m (4,022 ft)

The Tauern Railway Tunnel (German: Tauerntunnel) in Austria is the longest tunnel of the Tauern Railway crossing the main chain of the Alps. Currently, it has a length of 8.371 kilometres (5.201 mi). The highest point of the tunnel, which is also the highest point in all of the railway line, is at 1,226 metres (4,022 ft) above sea level. The tunnel's north entrance is at Böckstein in the valley of Bad Gastein in the state of Salzburg, while the south entrance is near Mallnitz in Carinthia.

The construction of the Tauern Railway Tunnel was first mooted during the late nineteenth century, although actual work on its construction was started in July 1902. The excavation was performed via a labour intensive process by a mostly Italian workforce overseen by the civil engineer Karl Wurmb. It was effectively finished during 1906, and formally opened three years later by Emperor Francis Joseph of Austria. While trains were initially operated by steam locomotives, the tunnel and wider line alike were electrified during the interwar period, after which it was almost exclusively operated by electric traction instead.

One particularly noteworthy service that has long used the Tauern Railway Tunnel was the Autoschleuse or Tauern Motorail car shuttle train service, launched amid the First World War, which carries motor vehicles between either side of the tunnel via specialised trains. Various road vehicles from buses and lorries to bikes can be carried upon cars designed to facilitate their rapid loading and unloading. On 12 August 1947, a bomb exploded under a British military train carrying 175 people from London to Villach in close proximity to the tunnel. Between 2000 and 2004, the Tauern tunnel underwent extensive renovation works, which included the shortening of the tunnel and the relocation of the northern entrance, the replacement of much of the rail infrastructure present, and new fire management systems being installed.

== Construction ==
Plans for the construction of an interconnection railway line between the terminus of the Austrian Western Railway at the city of Salzburg and Villach leading to the Southern Railway existed as early as the 1880s. The most challenging geographical obstruction to the envisioned line was the High Tauern mountain range, which would need to be traversed by a sizable tunnel of around five miles in length, roughly one-tenth of the overall mileage of the line. Furthermore, the local geology featured numerous hot springs. Despite this challenge, it was foreseen that such a railway would be especially important for the transportation of goods between the industrialised north of Austria-Hungary and Trieste, which was then host to the empire's principal seaport on the Adriatic Sea.

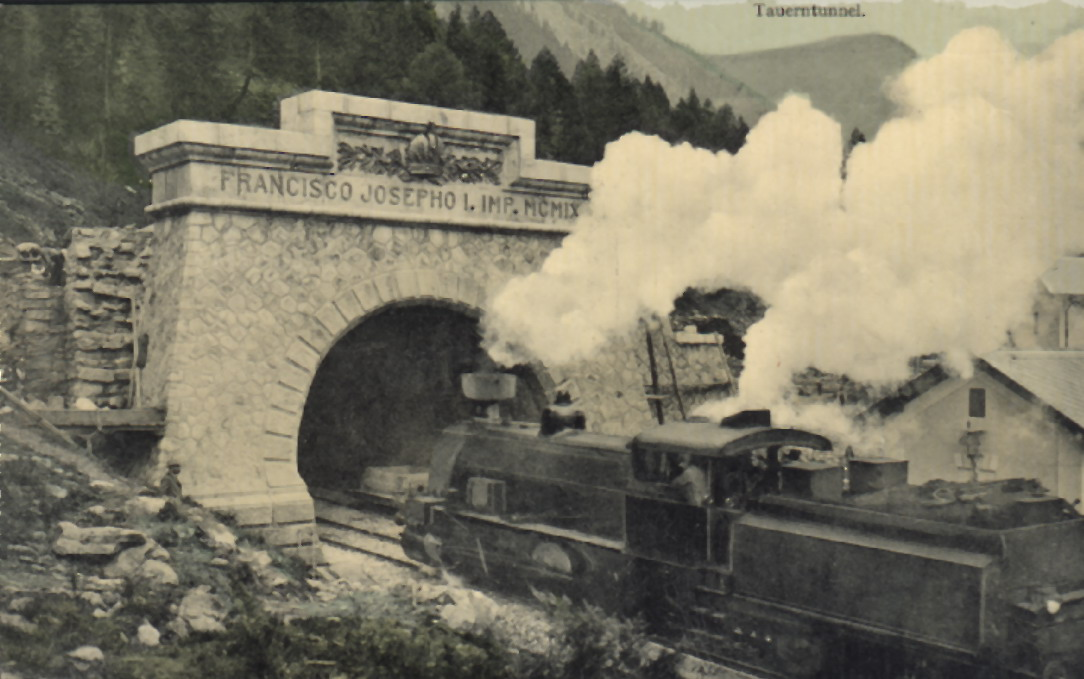
A steam-hauled train entering the southern portal, circa 1911. Note the lack of overhead electrification apparatus present

Pressure for Austria to proceed with such a venture had increased considerably after their Swiss neighbours had fulfilled the remarkable engineering achievement embodied by the completion of the lengthy Gotthard Tunnel on 1 July 1882. Accordingly, serious planning for the Tauern railway line and tunnel commenced in the early 1890s. During July 1902, excavation work on the tunnel commenced from the northern side; boring activity at the southern side started in October of that same year. The work was supervised by the noted civil engineer Karl Wurmb (1850-1907), whilst a mostly Italian workforce undertook most of the backbreaking labour involved.

Unlike the majority of tunnels along the line, Tauern Tunnel was equipped with the Saccardo system of ventilation.

Despite numerous difficulties encountered during its construction, the tunnel was effectively finished during 1906. On 5 July 1909, the official opening of the Tauern Railway line and tunnel alike occurred, the ceremony being attended by various dignitaries, including Emperor Francis Joseph. Although the majority of the line's sections were originally built as a single track, the tunnel was equipped with a pair of tracks throughout from the start of operations.

== Operational history ==
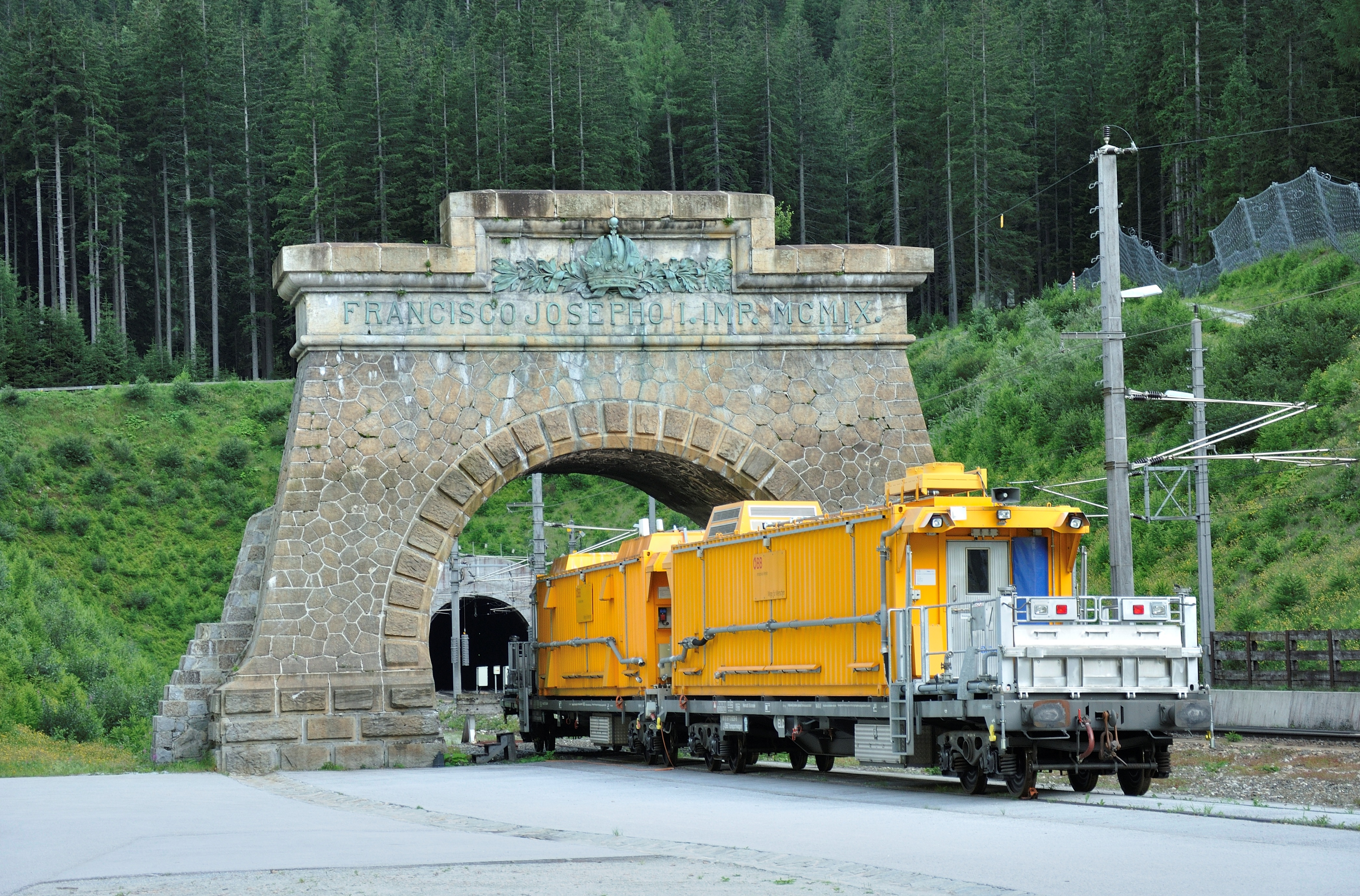
View of the old northern portal (foreground), and the active new northern tunnel portal (background), July 2012

Between 1925 and 1935, work was undertaken to electrify the tunnel along with the rest of the line. This scheme included the construction of a power station to produce the needed energy to the west of Mallnitz. Due to a high degree of pre-existing infrastructure, the cost of the whole line's electrification did not exceed £400,000; it reportedly reduced the journey times of passenger trains across the whole route by twenty-five per cent as well as freight trains by fifty per cent. As a natural consequence of this work, steam locomotives no longer traversed the tunnel, having been replaced by electric counterparts; as such, the air intakes that were formerly needed to supply the tunnel with additional fresh air were deemed to be surplus to requirements.

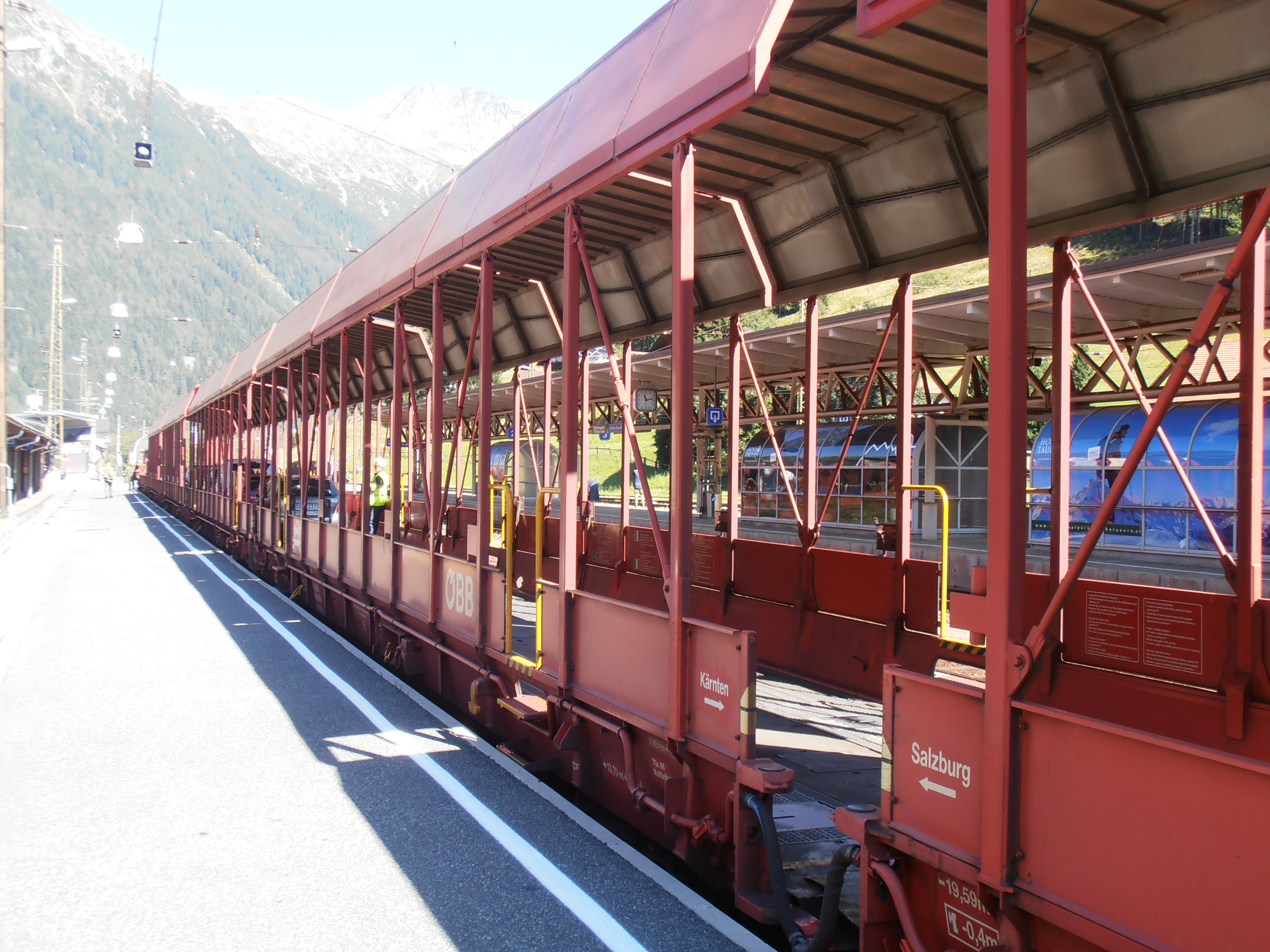
An Autoschleuse train in Mallnitz, September 2011

During the First World War, the Autoschleuse service, carrying motor vehicles between either side of the tunnel by trains, commenced. Also referred to as the Tauernschleuse service, or in English as Tauern Motorail, the service consists of a specially adapted car shuttle train, which have been designed to facilitate the rapid loading and unloading of large amounts of road vehicles, including larger types such as buses and lorries. While passengers used to originally stay within their vehicles throughout the journey, changes in safety legislation have led to the passengers being carried within several passenger carriages instead, as the road vehicles are required to be unoccupied while traversing the tunnel.

On 12 August 1947, a bomb exploded under a British military train carrying 175 people from London to Villach in close proximity to the tunnel. The bomb, which detonated underneath the baggage compartment, injured one soldier; a second bomb was present but failed to explode. It was apparently intended for the train to derail and fall over a steep cliff. The terrorist group Irgun was later implicated in the attack.

Between 2000 and 2004, the Tauern tunnel underwent extensive renovation works. During these works, the northern tunnel entrance was substantially altered as a means of rectifying a rather notorious curve near to this entrance which had caused numerous trains to derail over the years. As the first part of the tunnel was not particularly deep underground, it was permanently dug open, effectively moving the tunnel entrance southwards by 179 metres and shortening the tunnel's length from 8,550 to 8,371 metres. The edifice of old tunnel entrance was left intact in its original location, albeit with no operational purpose; it presently stands as a memorial arch. This period of renovation also saw the replacement of all the rails and power lines inside the tunnel, while damaged sections of tunnel wall were repaired, and fire detection systems were installed.

The tunnel was scheduled to close from 18 November 2024 for further modernisation. With the work completed, it reopened on 14 July 2025.

== Safety issues ==
Following a large number of serious accidents in other tunnels, such as Austria's Tauern Road Tunnel on 29 May 1999, as well as in other countries, (Mont Blanc Tunnel on 24 March 1999, and Gotthard Tunnel on 24 October 2001), the Austrian government undertook a comprehensive evaluation of safety conditions and requirements in respect to tunnels, both for road and railway traffic, to reduce such occurrences. In particular, concerns were drawn to the large amounts of dangerous goods that were regularly being transported via such tunnels. Accordingly, scheduled renovations in the decades following these events have seen the installation of extensive safety-related systems, including fire detection sensors, emergency reporting systems and escape route indications. Special fire extinguishing trains have also been positioned on stand-by at both ends of the tunnel. The Tauern Railway's car transport service also saw some changes to implement the new safety regulations issued around this time. Formerly, passengers using the Autoschleuse were allowed to stay in their cars during the eleven minute journey; nowadays, all passengers have to get into a passenger carriage directly behind the locomotive.
