= Abraham of Freising =

Bishop of Freising, Germany (died 993 or 994)

Abraham (died 7 June 993 or 994) was the bishop of Freising from 957 until his death. Little is known of his background or his life before he became bishop, but he was probably a scribe at the court of Otto I. As bishop, he was active in expanding the diocese's property, library holdings and spiritual jurisdiction, especially into Slavic territory. The Freising monuments attest his concern for the evangelization of the Slavs. He shared the regency of the Duchy of Bavaria during the minority of Duke Henry II and oversaw the education of Henry's son, the future King Henry II.

Full-page illustration of the crucifixion of Jesus from Abraham's sacramentary

== Ancestry ==
Abraham was probably born before 927, since the canonical age for a bishop was thirty. There are two main theories of his ancestry. Beginning with the Chronicon Carinthiacum of Jakob Unrest in the 15th century, it was commonly thought that Abraham was a Carantanian Slav. Unrest specifically made him a descendant of the counts of Gorizia. The argument for this was the presence of Slavonic texts, the so-called Freising monuments, in a manuscript once owned by Abraham, now Clm 6426.

Karl Meichelbeck in his Historiae Frisingensis of 1724 first cast doubt on the Slavic theory. Today it is widely believed that Abraham was a Bavarian from the Sundergau. This is largely based on the evidence of naming practices. The nobility of the Sundergau showed a marked preference for Old Testament names, highly unusual for the time. There is a record of a count named Abraham from 940.

== Early life ==
Little can be said of his life before he became a bishop. He has been identified with the notary named Abraham who was the scribe of a royal charter of 952. The same scribe, albeit unnamed, was responsible for another royal charter of 965, which would mean that Abraham continued to work as a notary and scribe for the court after becoming bishop. The same hand has been detected in the manuscript Clm 6388, where it added a copy of Liutprand of Cremona's Historia Ottonis sometime after 965. If the notary and bishop are one and the same, it is possible that Abraham worked not in the chancery of Otto I, but in his chapel.

Abraham was present as a witness at an exchange of land in Freising on 19 September 957. The deed of transaction, which refers to him as "afterwards bishop", was drawn up only after the death of his predecessor, Lantpert. The reason for his presence in Freising is unknown. He may have been living at the Weihenstephan collegiate church.

== Episcopate ==
Abraham was consecrated as bishop on 21 December 957. Duke Henry I of Bavaria had died the previous month and the guardianship of his young son, Duke Henry II, was entrusted to Abraham and the duke's widow, Judith. Writing half a century later, Thietmar of Merseburg reports that the bishop and the duchess were rumoured to have had an inappropriate relationship, rumours Abraham publicly denied in an oration at Judith's funeral in 985.

Modeling Freising on the royal court, Abraham created the office of archchaplain and chamberlain. He added a westwork to Freising Cathedral as a place for the royal family to attend Mass. He expanded the holdings of the Freising Cathedral Library. He borrowed manuscripts from Metz and Toul for copying. He commissioned an illuminated sacramentary, now Clm 6421. He had strong Italian connections. Clm 6426, which includes the Freising monuments, also includes some sermons by Bishop Rather of Verona copied by Rather himself. In Clm 6388, alongside Liutprand's Historia Ottonis is his Antapodosis, which was copied by Italian scribes. This manuscript also includes Regino of Prüm's Chronicon, the introduction of which may have been copied by Abraham.

Abraham greatly expanded Freising's landed possessions. There are 175 surviving records of property transactions from his episcopate. One of the most important of these was the gift of the lordship of Loka in the march of Carniola by Otto II on 30 June 973. The lordship was expanded and its borders precisely defined in November. Abraham also expanded his spiritual jurisdiction over the Slavs in this region.

In 974, following the failed rebellion of his former charge, Duke Henry II, Abraham was forced into semi-exile. This lasted until 983. The Annales Altahenses maiores indicate that he spent his exile in Corvey Abbey in another part of the kingdom. His time at Corvey as likely short. He was engaged in land transactions in Bavaria during this period. It is probable that he spent most of this time on an estate at Godego across the Alps, an estate that had been donated to him for private use by Innichen Abbey. The copying of the Freising monuments probably dates to this period.

Abraham was in charge of the education of Duke Henry II's son, the future King Henry II. He died on 7 June 993 or 994 in Freising.

== Works cited ==
- Becher, Kurt (1953). "Abraham". Neue Deutsche Biographie (in German). Vol. 1. Berlin: Duncker & Humblot. p. 21. (full text online).
- Lenssens, Anke (2024). "Abraham of Freising, a Legendary Bishop (957–994)". In E. Eržen Podlipnik; M. Ferle; H. Janežič; J. Šega (eds.). Škofja Loka 1050: Zbornik Prispevkov z Znanstvenega Posveta Škofja Loka 1050. Občina. pp. 59–81.
- Warner, David A. (2001). Ottonian Germany: The Chronicon of Thietmar of Merseburg. Manchester University Press.
