= Joseph Kyselak =

Austrian mountaineer (1799–1831)

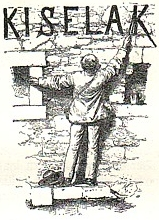
- Illustration to Joseph Victor von Scheffel's poem about Kyselak
- Born: Joseph Michael Kyselak; March 9, 1798; St. Ulrich, Vienna, Archduchy of Austria
- Died: September 17, 1831 (aged 33); Palais Strozzi, Vienna, Austrian Empire
- Other names: Josef Kyselak
- Education: Piarist High School
- Alma mater: University of Vienna
- Occupation: Assessor
- Years active: 1825 – 1831
- Era: Long nineteenth century
- Known for: Tagging his name across the Hapsburg Lands
- Movement: Romanticism
- Parents: Joseph Kyselack (father); Josepha née Seiffert (mother)

Tag
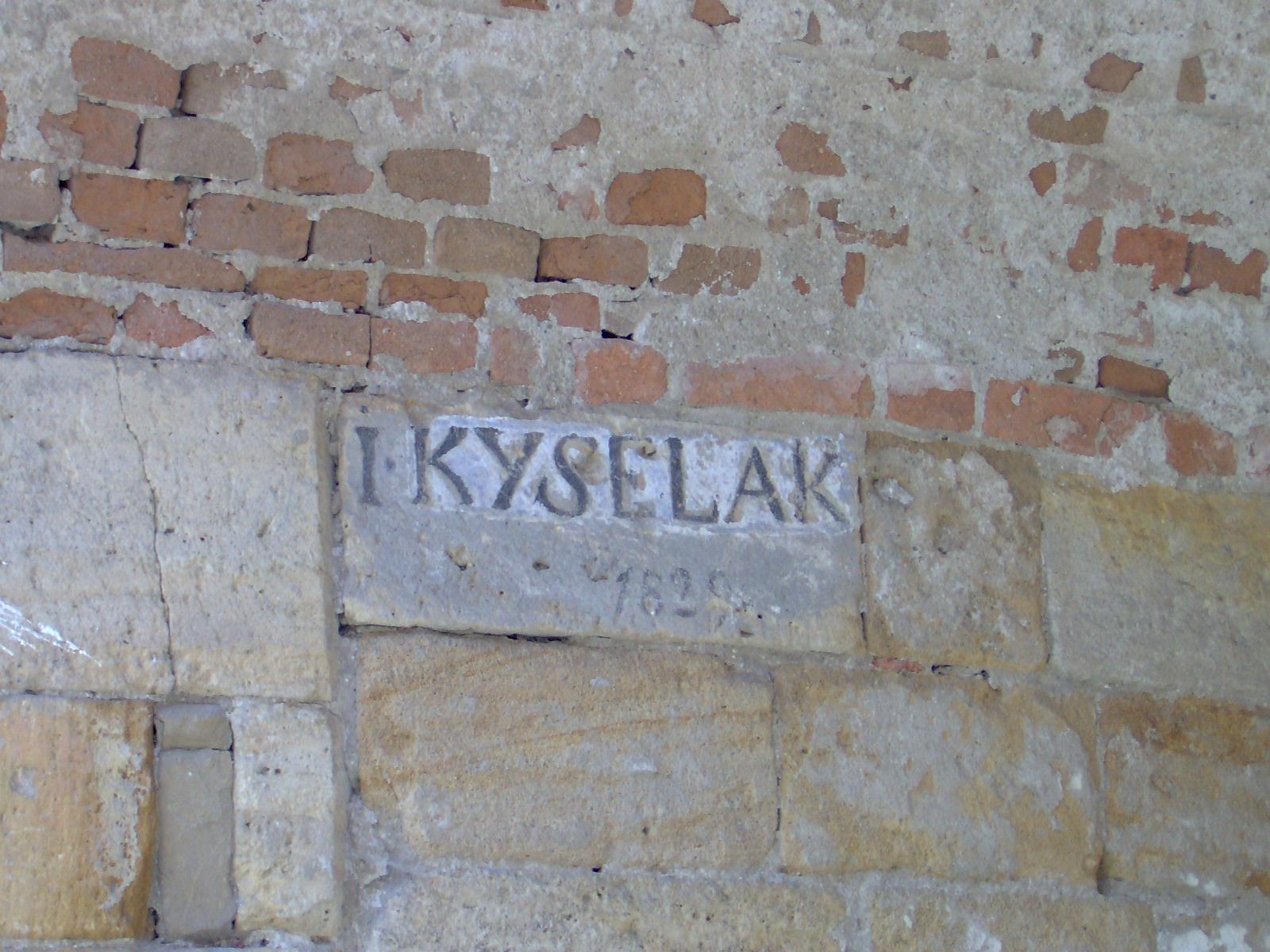

Joseph, also Josef Kyselak (9 March 1798 – 17 September 1831) was an Austrian civil servant, mountaineer and travel writer. He became famous for his habit to tag his name onto prominent places during his hikes across the Austrian Empire.

== Life ==
The son of a family of civil servants, Kyselak was born in Vienna, where he attended the Piarist Gymnasium in the Josefstadt district. After he took his Matura degree, he worked as a fiscal, from 1825 in the rank of an assessor.

Allegedly as a wager, Kyselak began to write his name onto numerous places in the Habsburg lands and beyond. In 1829 he published a comprehensive account of an 1825 travel through Austria, Styria, Carinthia, Berchtesgaden, Tyrol, and Bavaria to Vienna, describing the engraving on Oberkapfenberg Castle. According to legend, he became so well known that Emperor Francis I of Austria ordered him to stop tagging public buildings and Kyselak promised to comply. The emperor found Kyselak's name carved into his desk following the audience.

Kyselak is even said to have climbed the peak of Mt. Chimborazo in Ecuador, where Alexander von Humboldt found his graffito in 1837. In fact, Humboldt visited the mountain already in 1802. Kyselak died as a victim of an 1831 cholera epidemic in Vienna.

== Film ==
- mentary in cooperation with the Austrian Broadcasting Company ORF: Kyselak – The First Graffiti Tagger

== Legacy ==
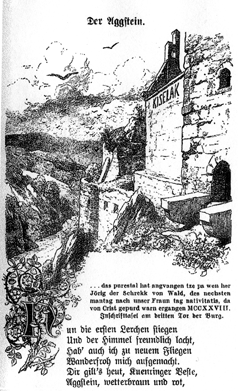
Der Aggstein, illustration by Anton von Werner, c. 1868

Kyselak has been regarded as a predecessor of contemporary tagging and popular culture expressions, such as Kilroy was here or Peter-Ernst Eiffe. Numerous Kyselak graffiti are preserved, however often imitations.

His habit earned him an entry in Constantin von Wurzbach's Biographisches Lexikon des Kaiserthums Oesterreich (Biographical dictionary of the Austrian Empire, 1856–91). Kyselak is also mentioned in Joseph Victor von Scheffel's poem Der Aggstein (1863).
