= Flattach =

- Municipality
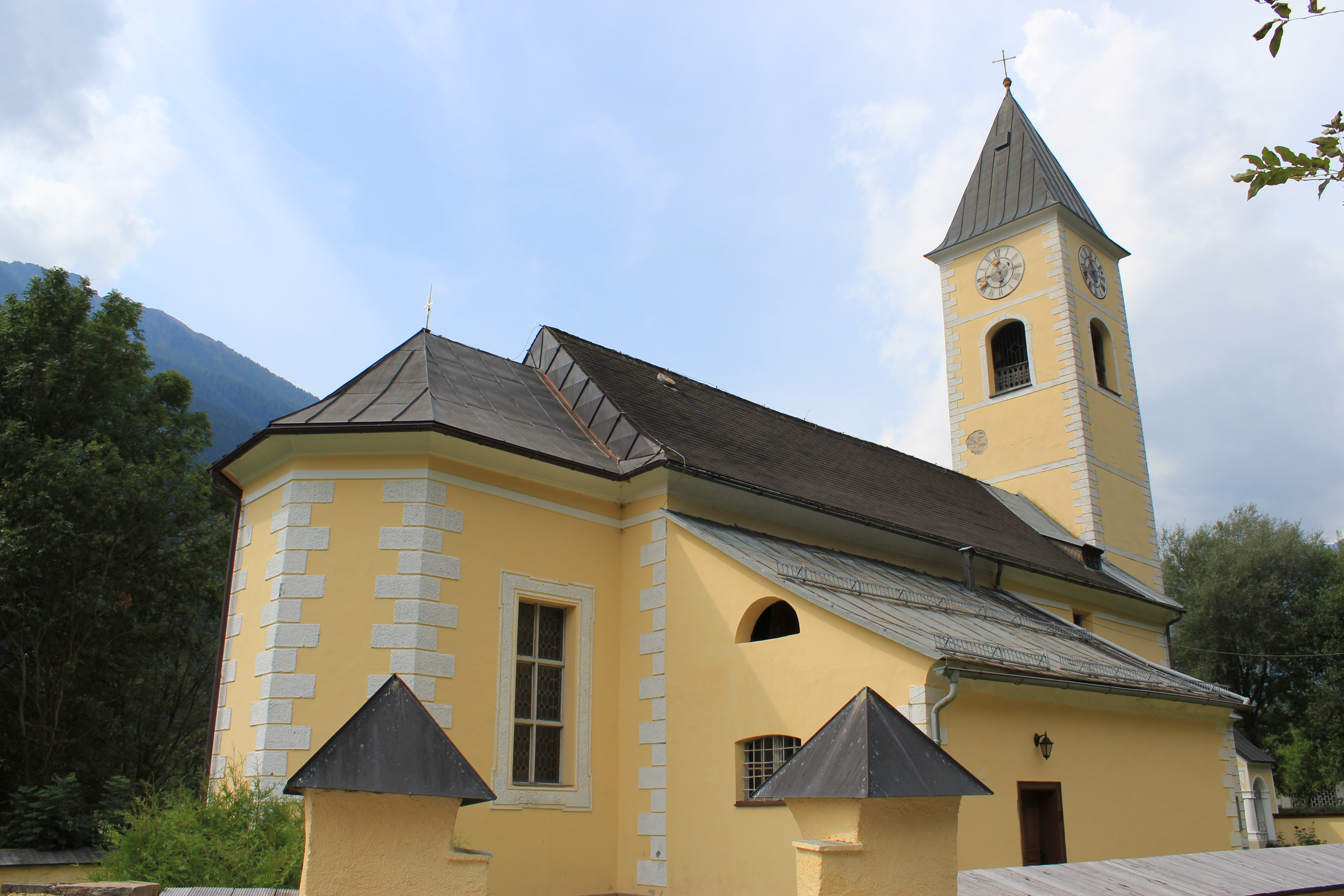
- Parish Church

- Coat of arms

- Location within Austria
- Coordinates: 46°56′06″N 13°07′48″E
- Country: Austria
- State: Carinthia
- District: Spittal an der Drau

Government
  - Mayor: Kurt Schober (ULF)

Area
  - Total: 98.69 km^{2} (38.10 sq mi)
- Elevation: 696 m (2,283 ft)

Population (2018-01-01)
  - Total: 1,200
  - Density: 12/km^{2} (31/sq mi)
- Time zone: UTC+1 (CET)
  - Summer (DST): UTC+2 (CEST)
- Postal code: 9831
- Area code: 04785
- Website: flattach.gv.at

Flattach (Slovene: Blato) is a municipality in Spittal an der Drau District in the Austrian state of Carinthia.

== Geography ==
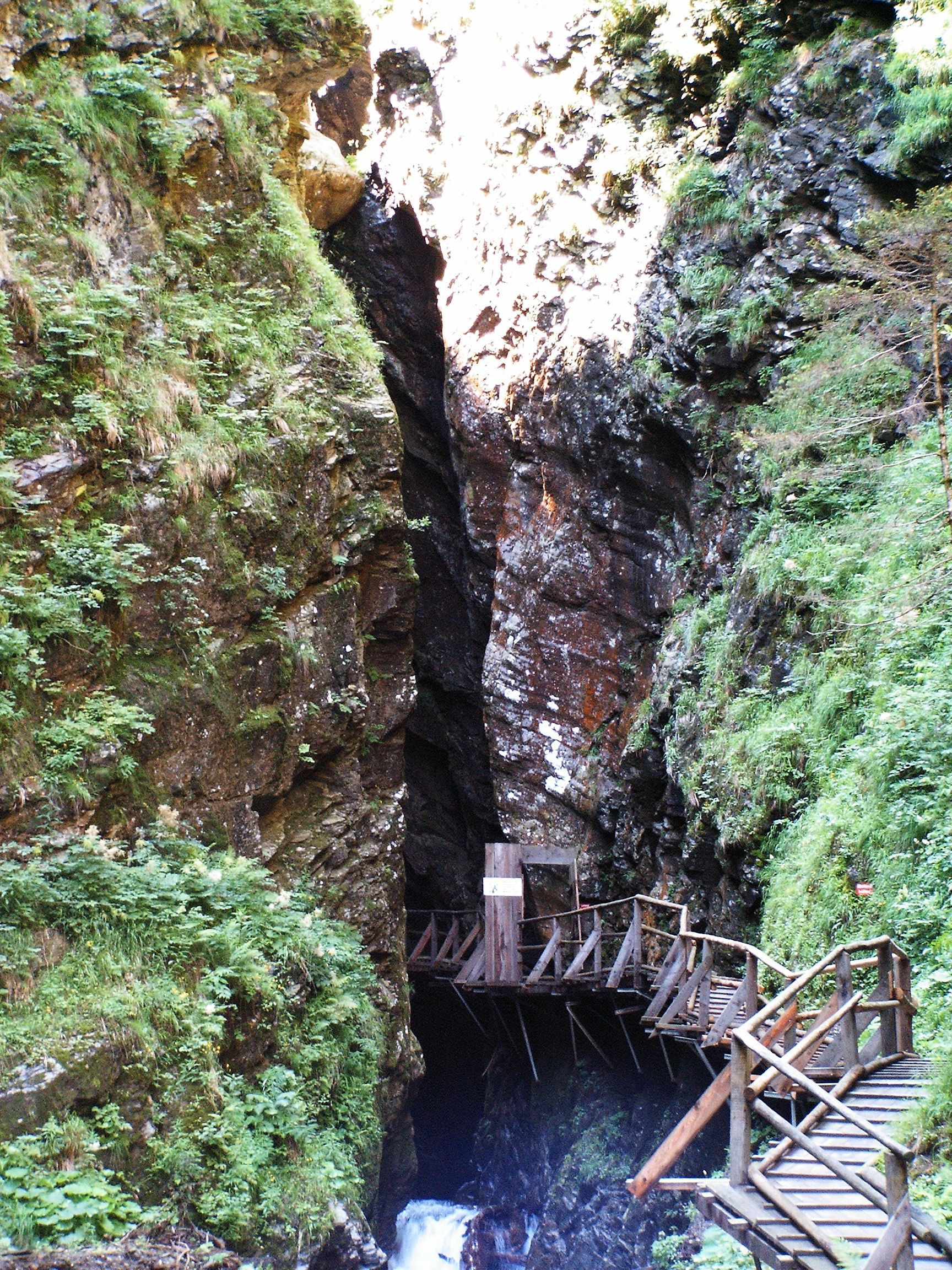
Ragga Gorge

It is located in the valley of the Möll, a left tributary to the Drava, between the Goldberg and the Kreuzeck groups of the Hohe Tauern mountain range. Flattach mainly depends on tourism, offering the nearby Mölltal Glacier ski area located on the Schareck and the Wurtenkees glacier and the Raggaschlucht, a narrow gorge within the southern Kreuzeck range with walls up to 200 m (650 ft) high and wooden walkways above the water. It is also the site of a group of hydroelectric power stations collecting water from several reservoirs in the northern Ankogel mountains with an installed capacity of 474 MW.

It can be reached via the B106 Mölltal Straße highway running from Lurnfeld in the Drava valley toward Winklern and the Grossglockner High Alpine Road. An old mule track over the Fragrant Tauern mountain pass in the north connects it with Rauris in the neighbouring state of Salzburg.

The municipal area consists of the cadastral communities Flattach and Fragrant.

== History ==
The name of the settlement is probably derived from Slovene blato, "swamp". The municipality did not emerge until 1895 from the market town of Obervellach in the east. For centuries it had been an agricultural (transhumance) and also a mining area, especially for iron and copper. The economic situation has undergone a fundamental change, since the Fragrant power plant group was erected from 1963 onwards and the first ski-lift was built in 1987.

== Politics ==
Seats in the municipal assembly (Gemeinderat) as of 2015 local elections:

- Unabhängige Liste Flattach (Independent): 8
- Team Alternative für Flattach (Independent): 4
- Social Democratic Party of Austria (SPÖ): 2
- Freedom Party of Austria (FPÖ): 1

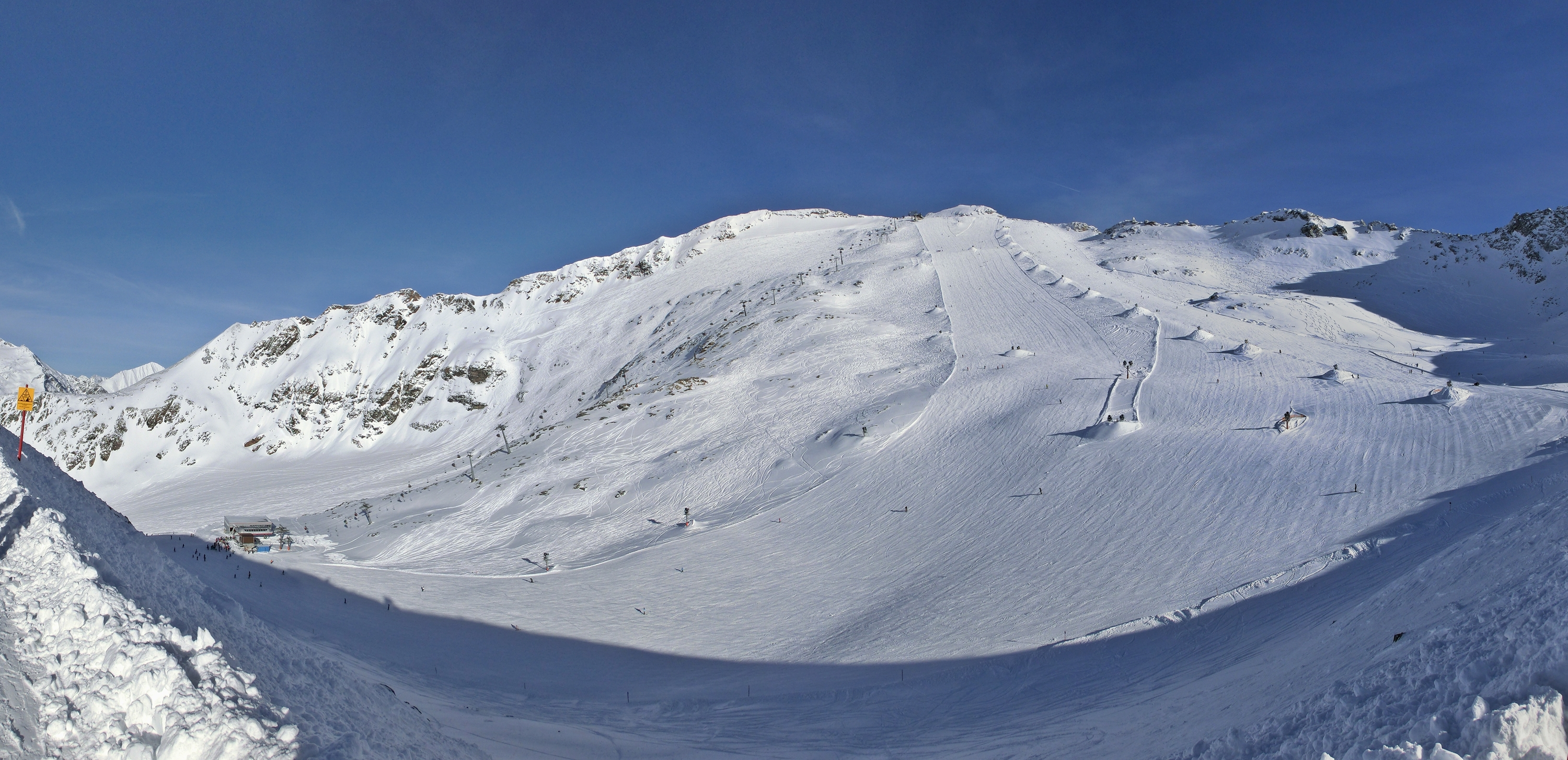
Mölltal Glacier

== Twin town ==
- Waghäusel, Germany
