= Schareck =

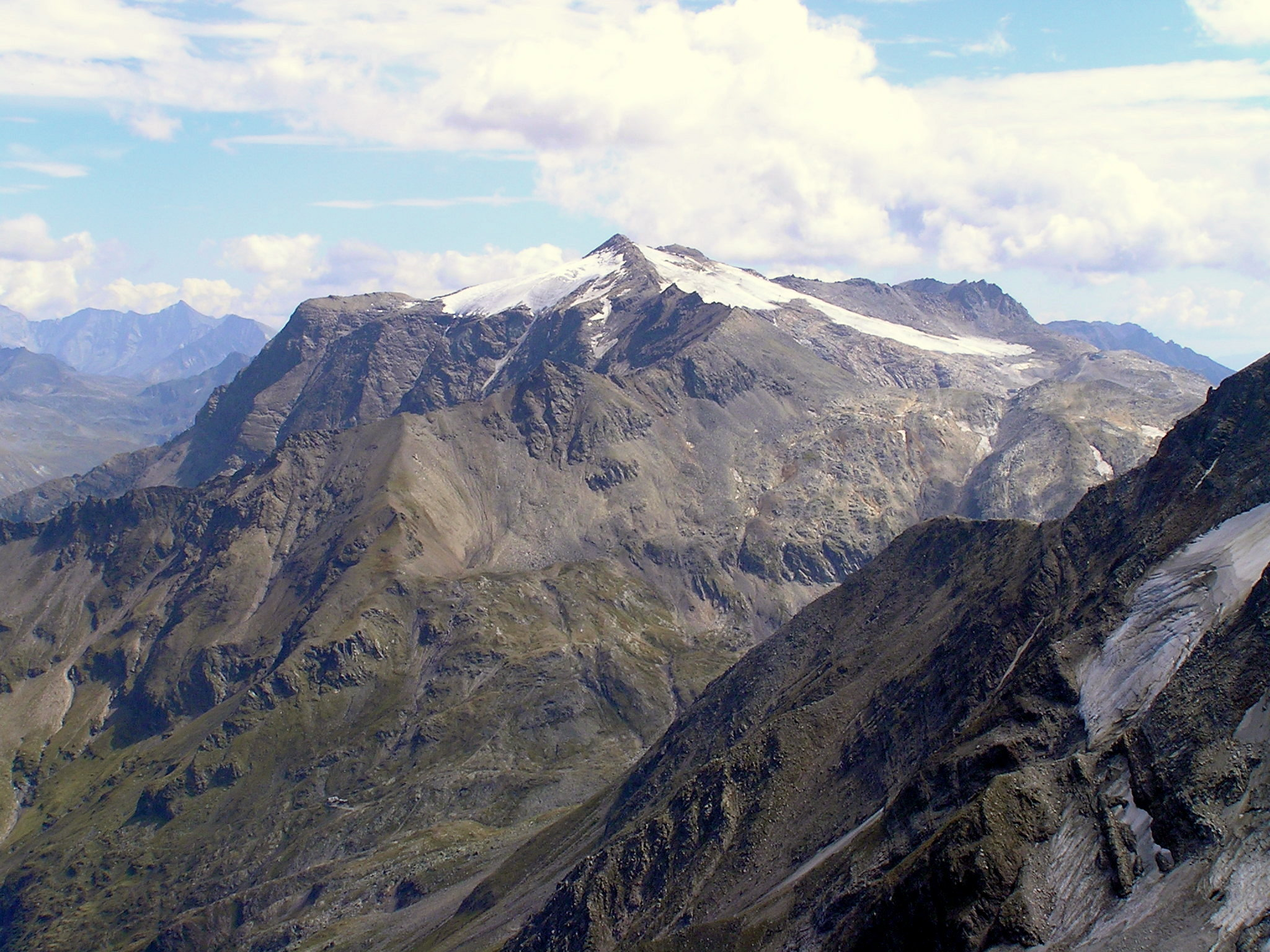
- The Schareck seen from the ascent to Hocharn. Right of the summit is the Wurtenkees. Front right: the north side of the Hoher Sonnblick

Highest point
- Elevation: 3,123 m (AA) (10,246 ft)
- Prominence: 427 m ↓ Niedere Scharte
- Isolation: 6.90 km → Hocharn
- Listing: Alpine mountains above 3000 m
- Coordinates: 47°02′29″N 13°01′04″E

Geography
- Location within Austria
- Location: border of Carinthia/Salzburg, Austria
- Parent range: High Tauern, Goldberg Group

Climbing
- Normal route: Ascent from the Mölltaler Gletscher Ski Region

The Schareck, a mountain with a height of 3,123 m (AA), lies in the Goldberg Group of the High Tauern in Austria.

== Location and landscape ==
The summit is located on the main chain of the Alps, exactly on the border between the states of Carinthia and Salzburg, ca. 4.8 km as the crow flies east-southeast of the Hoher Sonnblick. The Schareck is the second highest summit in the Goldberg range after the Hocharn. Southwest of the summit is the glacier of Wurtenkees and the ski region of Mölltaler Gletscher. Below the mountain is the Hochwurtenspeicher reservoir of the Fragant power station complex. To the north, another glacier, the Schareckkees, reaches to just below the top.

As a result of the opening of the ski region with its lift systems, ascending the Schareck from the south has virtually no climbing merit any longer.

== Ascents ==
- From the south: from the top station of the highest chair lift it takes a few minutes to reach the summit
- The so-called Pröll Way (Pröll-Weg), which is waymarked, offers an attractive climb from the northwest to the top. It runs from the Niedersachsenhaus along a sweeping mountain ridge or arête to the summit. This route, which crosses the Neuner Kogel (2,827 m) and the Herzog Ernst (2,933 m), is relatively easy to negotiate in dry and snow-free conditions albeit sure-footedness and a head for heights are required. There is one climbing section secured with footpegs (Trittstiften).
- From Schutzhaus Neubau (Raurisertal/Kolm Saigurn) is a straightforward climb via the Tauerngold Erlebnisweg to the col of Fraganter Scharte and then onto the Herzog Ernst Spitze (2,933 m) taking ca. 2½ hours (path no. 119). From there one can reach the top of the Schareck in ca. 1 hour. The path is exposed in places (path no. 120).
- From the northeast: from Sportgastein on the Neuwirt-Steig - Aperes Schareck - Schareckkees (crevasse-risk)

== Literature and maps ==
- Liselotte Buchenauer, Peter Holl: Ankogel- und Goldberggruppe, Alpine Club Guide, Bergverlag Rudolf Rother, Munich, 1986. ISBN 3-7633-1247-1
- Alpine Club map Sheet 42, 1:25,000 series, Sonnblick
