= Ritterkopf =

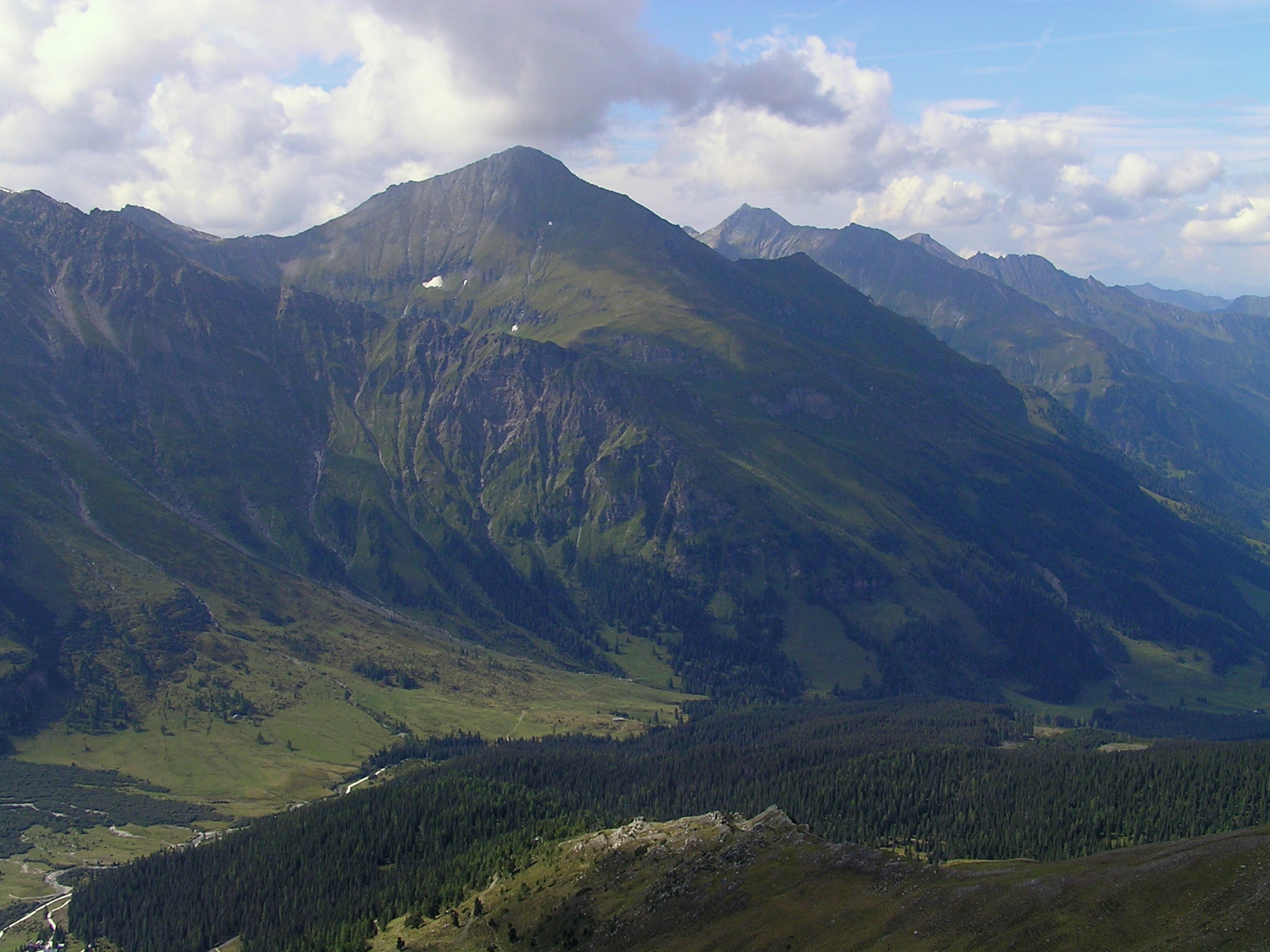
- The Ritterkopf from the southeast

Highest point
- Elevation: 3,006 m (AA) (9,862 ft)
- Prominence: 349 m ↓ Goldlacklscharte
- Isolation: 2.40 km → Grieswies-Schwarzkogel
- Listing: Alpine mountains above 3000 m
- Coordinates: 47°06′10″N 12°56′57″E

Geography
- Location within Austria
- Location: Salzburg, Austria
- Parent range: Goldberg Group/High Tauern

Climbing
- Normal route: east arête

The Ritterkopf is a prominent mountain in Rauris, about 3 km north of the main chain of the Tauern Alps in Austria, and separates the valleys of Krumltal and Hüttwinkltal. On the mountainsides there are the sites of mineral deposits (rock crystal, pyrite, actinolite), some of which are tourist attractions. In the Ritterkar cirque (east of the summit) gold was mined in the 16th century.

== Ascent ==
Because there are no waymarked paths on the mountain, a good sense of direction and clear weather are necessary and sure-footedness is also required in the trackless terrain. In addition, there are no mountain huts on the Ritterkopf, so a day should be allowed in order to climb through a total of about 1,800 metres (i.e. 900 metres up and 900 metres down again).

- The normal route runs from the Alpengasthof Bodenhaus inn through the Ritterkaralm and along the eastern arete to the summit.
- The north ridge is classified in the 1986 Alpine Club Guide as UIAA grade I.
- The ascent from the Krumltal valley through the Gamskar cirque, to the Goldlacklscharte col and along the south arete (Goldlacklschneid) is rated in the same guide as UIAA I; but because there is a section of the ridge with very sandy and friable rock (near the Goldlacklscharte; partly on the Reitgrat) it is only recommended for very experienced alpinists.

== Maps and guides ==
- Alpine Club map, Sheet 42, 1:25,000 series, Sonnblick (north side of the Ritterkopf no longer on the map section)
- Liselotte Buchenauer, Peter Holl: Alpine Club Guide Ankogel- und Goldbergruppe. Bergverlag Rudolf Rother, Munich, 1986. ISBN 3-7633-1247-1
