= Sadnig =

Mountain in the Goldberg Group in Carinthia

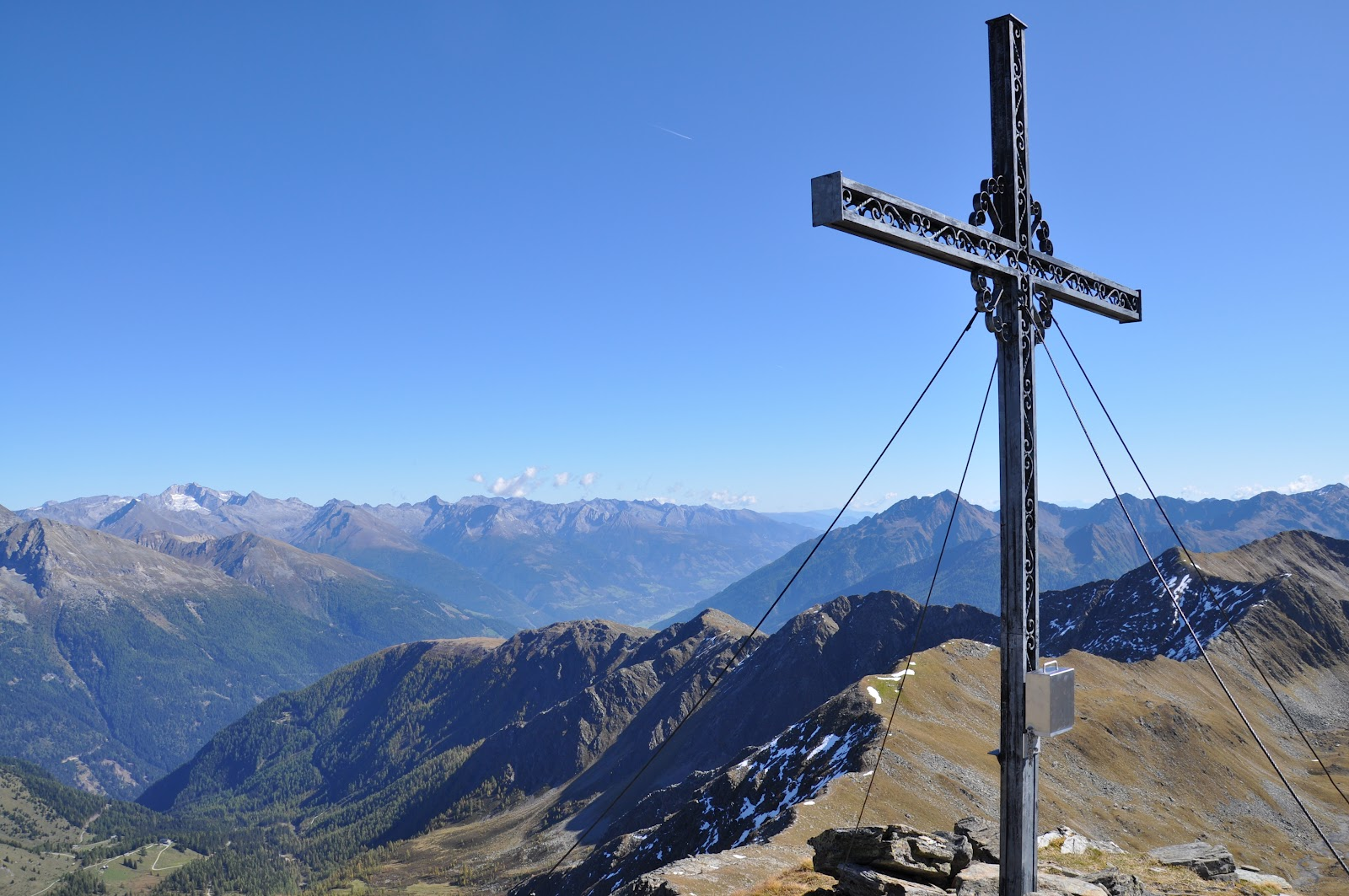
- Summit cross at Hoher Sadnig

Highest point
- Elevation: 2,745 m (AA) (9,006 ft)
- Prominence: 385 m ↓ Schobertörl
- Isolation: 4.5 km → Stellhöhe
- Coordinates: 46°56′28″N 12°59′21″E

Geography
- Location within Austria
- Location: Carinthia, Austria
- Parent range: Goldberg Group

Geology
- Rock age: Palaeozoic
- Rock type: mica schist

The Sadnig, also called the Hoher Sadnig ("High Sadnig") to distinguish it from its subpeaks, the Vorsadnig ("Fore-Sadnig"), Kleiner Sadnig ("Little Sadnigh") and Mulleter Sadnig ("Mullet Sadnig"), is the mountain that gives its name to the subrange known as the Sadnig Group, the southern part of the Goldberg Group, an Alpine mountain range in Austria.

The name Sadnig goes back to the Slovenian word zadnji ("hindmost" or "last").

The Sadnig is located on the boundary of the Großfragant, Asten and Kolmitzen, three side valleys of the Möll valley. It is also the tripoint of the municipalities of Flattach, Mörtschach and Stall.

The Vorsadnig is a northern subpeak, 2,696 metres high. The Kleiner Sadnig (2,626m) lies to the east beyond a slight saddle. The Mulleter Sadnig (2,569m) lies to the north, separated from the Hoher Sadnig by the col of Sadnigscharte (2,484m). To the west below the Sadnigscharte (Asten side) is the mountain lake of Sadnigsee. To the east below the Sadnigscharte rises the Sadnigbach, which empties downstream into the Großfragantbach.

The closing scene of the film Seven Years in Tibet was filmed at the summit of the Sadnig.

The Sadnig is usually climbed from the Fraganter Schutzhaus mountain hut in the Großfragant valley or the guest house of Sadnighaus (a former Alpine Club hut) in the Asten, both routes continuing via the col of Sadnigscharte.
