= Raggaschlucht =

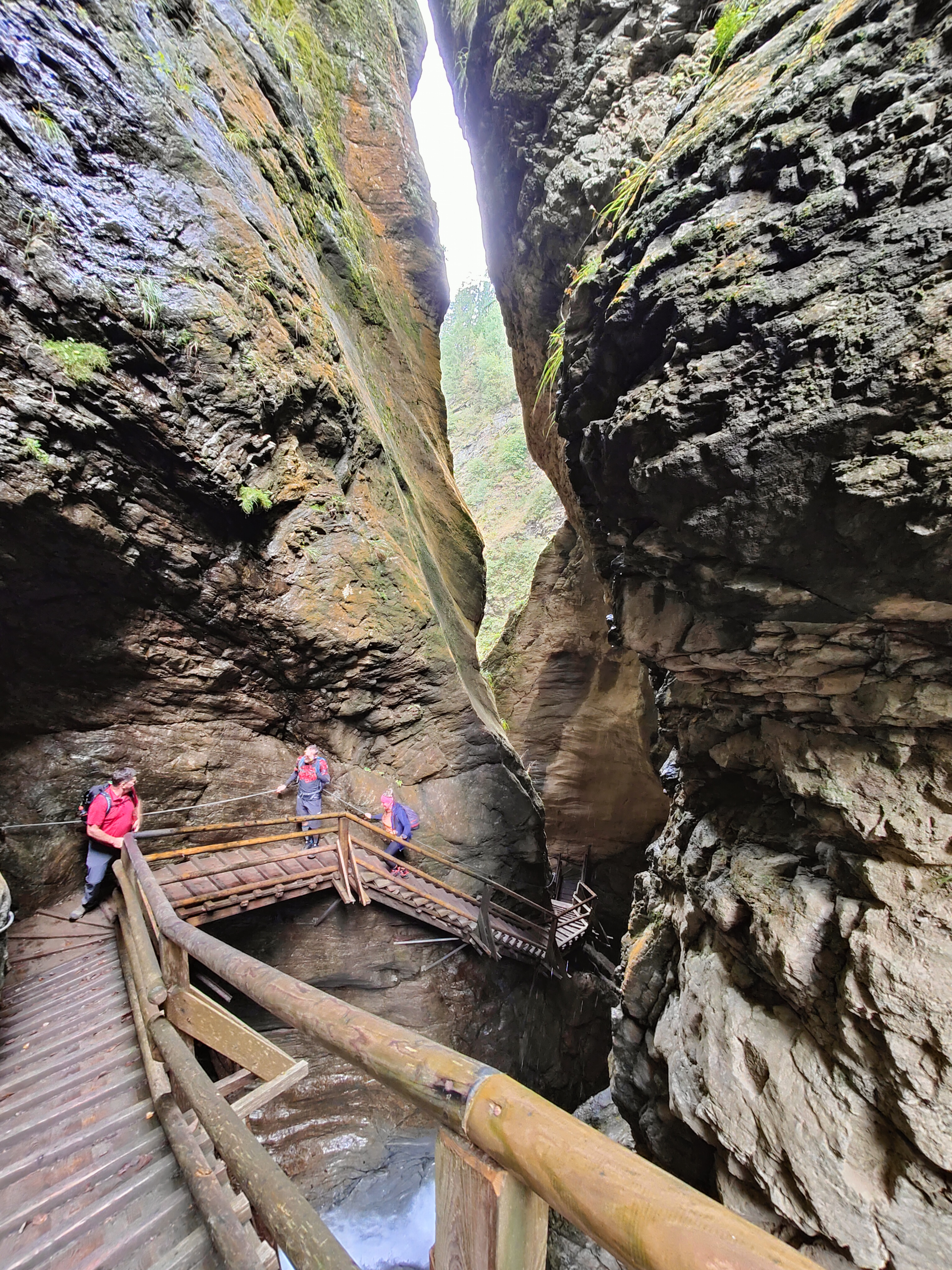
- Interactive map of Raggaschlucht
- Location: Flattach, Austria
- Coordinates: 46°55′38″N 13°08′32″E
- Elevation: 850 m (2,790 ft)
- Total height: 200 m (660 ft)
- Run: 800 meters

The Raggaschlucht is a gorge in the Austrian Möll Valley, near the village of Flattach in Carinthia. The name derives from the Slovene word rak (“crab”).

It was carved since the last Ice Age by the Raggabach stream into the massif of the Kreuzeck Group. At approximately 800 meters in length, it is one of the shorter gorges in Austria; however, due to its remarkable narrowness and depth of up to 200 meters, it is among the most impressive. The gorge is fully accessible to visitors via walkways, stairs, and bridges. Informational panels along the path explain the formation and geology of the gorge. The dominant rocks are paragneiss and mica schist. At the entrance to the gorge, a pegmatite intrusion forms a 10-meter-high step over which the Raggabach plunges into the gorge in a striking waterfall.

The Raggaschlucht was first opened to visitors in 1882 and may only be traversed uphill. It has been designated a natural monument since 1978.

During a severe storm in October 2018, the wooden walkways in the gorge were destroyed. They were restored in spring 2019, and the gorge was reopened on 9 June 2019.

== Photo gallery ==
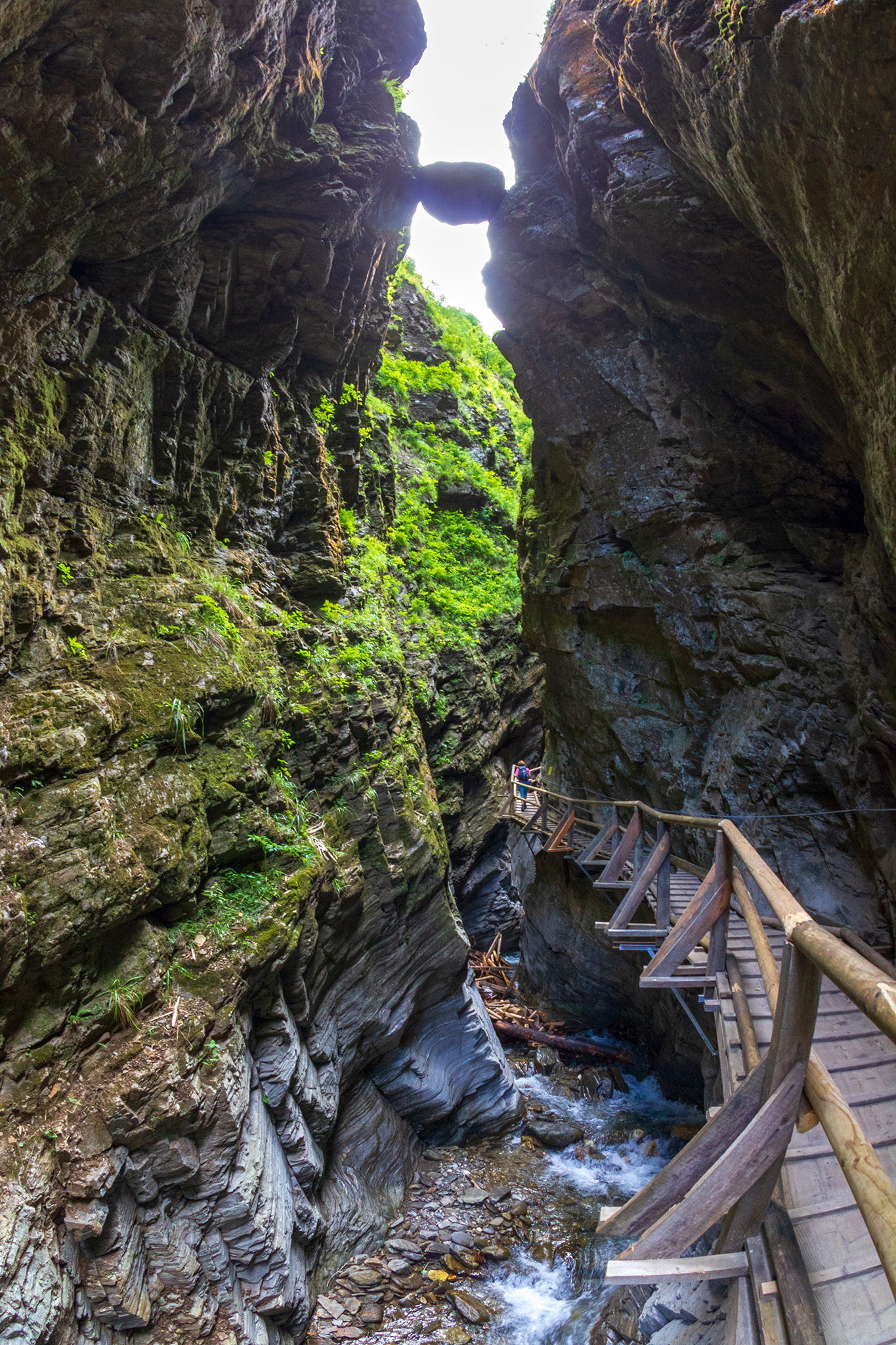
Wooden walkways in the Raggaschlucht gorge

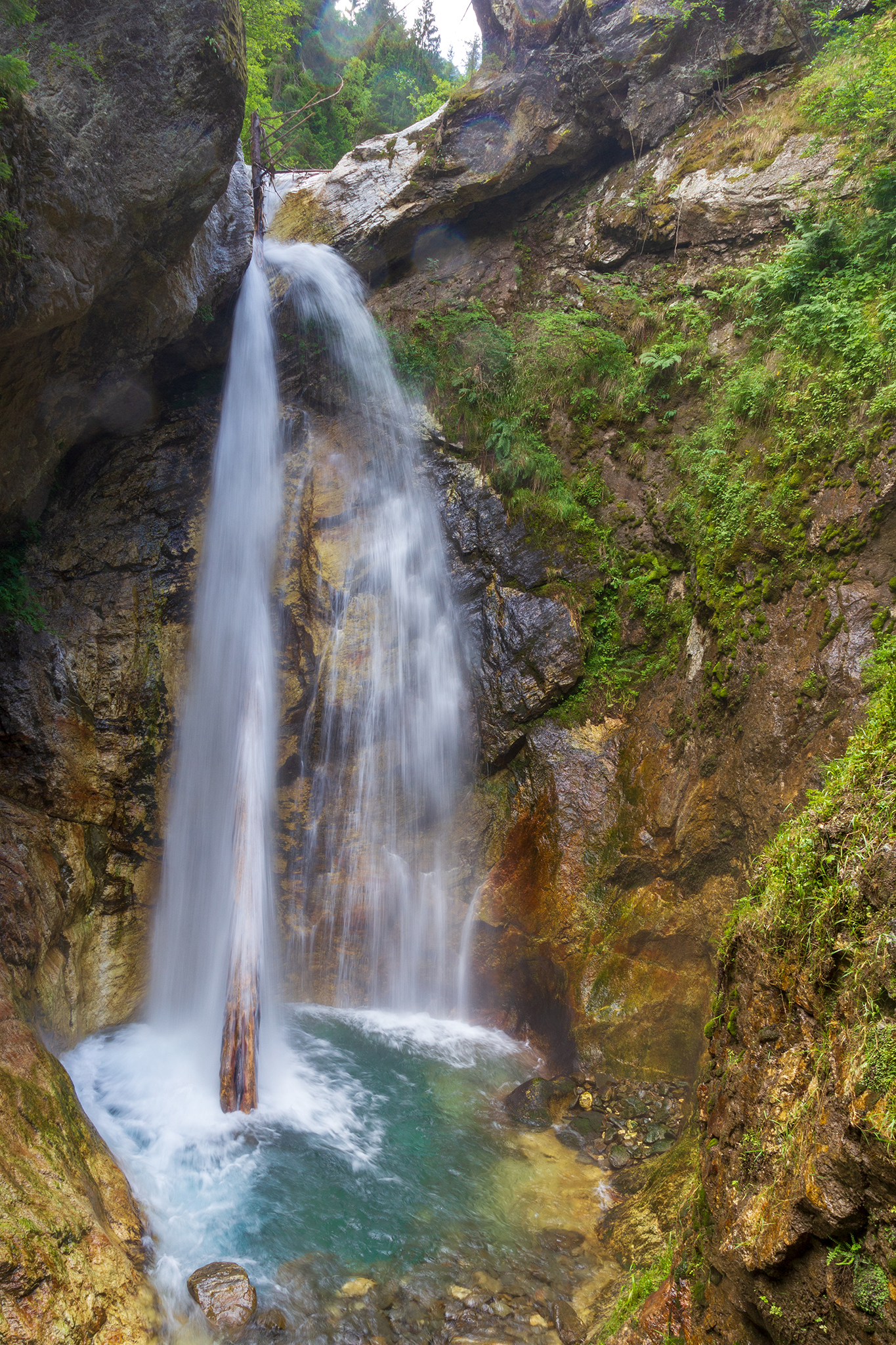
Waterfall at the end of the Raggaschlucht trail

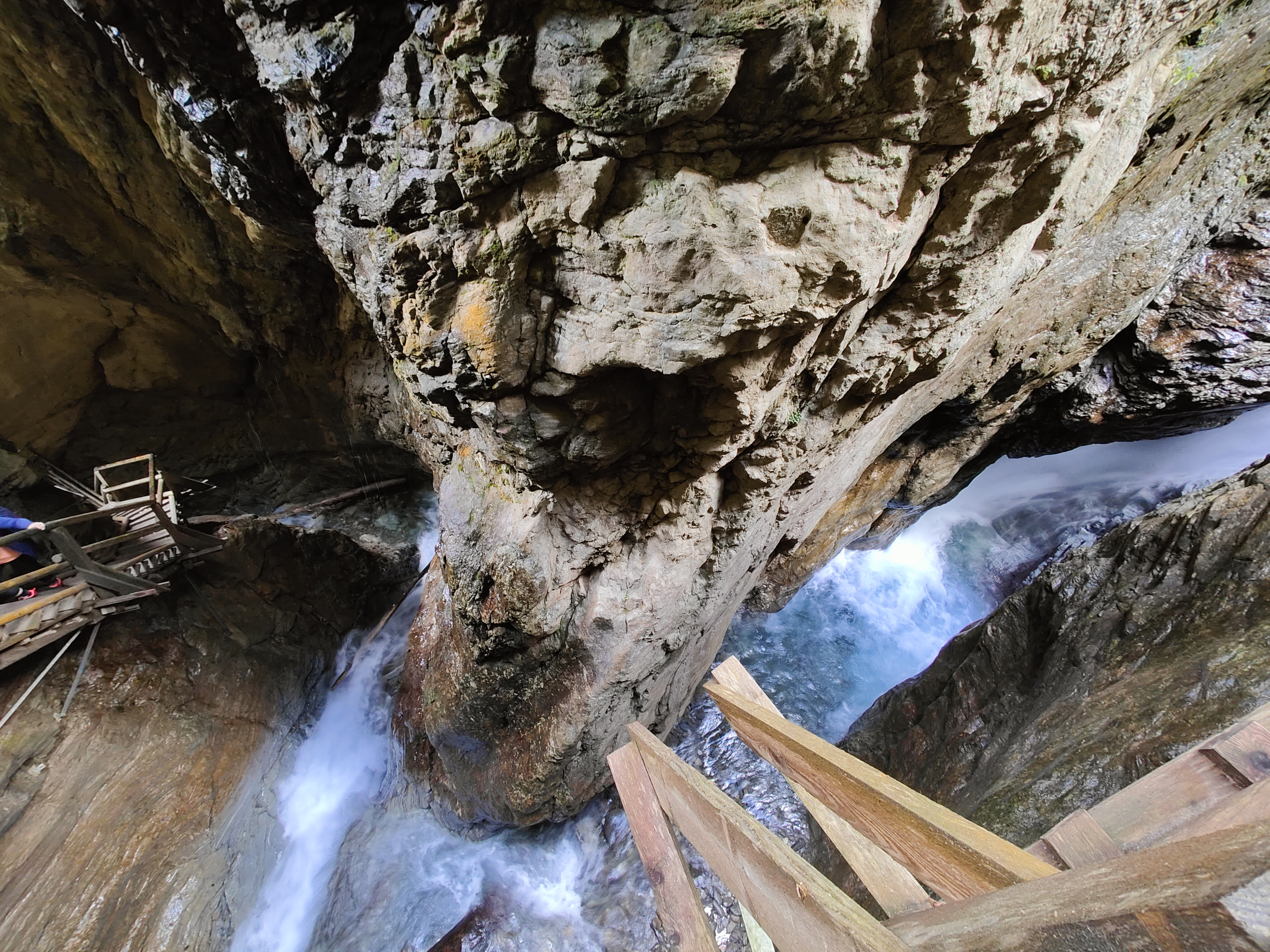
Winding gorge
