= Sonnblick =

A number of mountains are called Sonnblick:

- Sonnblick–Böseck Group, a subdivision of the Goldberg Group
  - Hoher Sonnblick, or Rauriser Sonnblick
- Großer Sonnblick or Malteiner Sonnblick, in the Ankogel Group
  - Mittlerer Sonnblick, a sub-peak
- Stubacher Sonnblick in the Granatspitze Group

== See also ==
- Hoher Sonnblick Observatory, of the Central Institution for Meteorology and Geodynamics
