= Goldberg Group =

Group of mountains in Austria

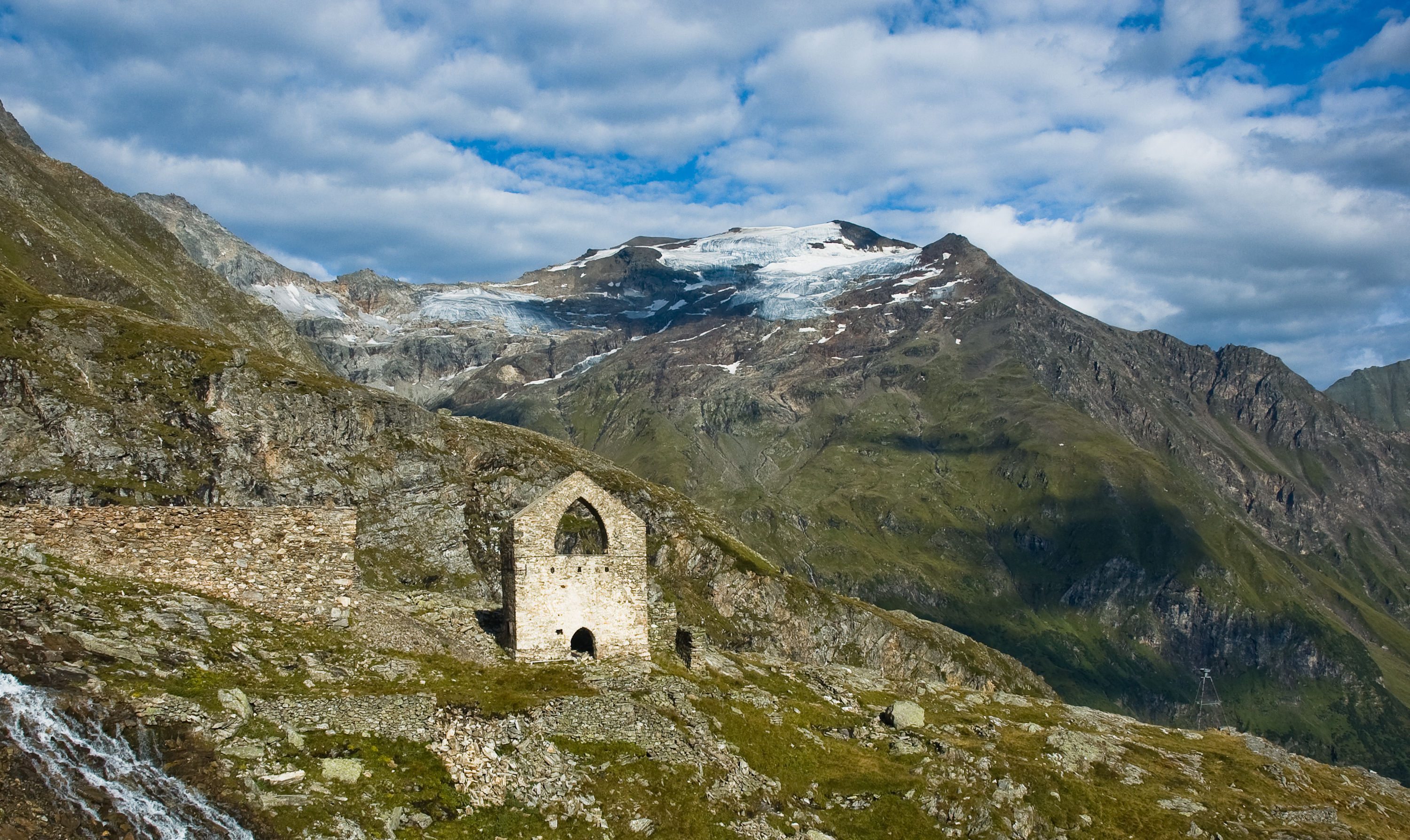
- Former wheelhouse of the Goldberg material ropeway with the Hocharn in the background

Highest point
- Peak: Hocharn
- Elevation: 3,254 m above sea level (AA)

Geography
- Location within Austria
- Country: Austria
- States: Carinthia and Salzburg
- Range coordinates: 47°04′00″N 12°56′00″E
- Parent range: Western Tauern Alps; Hohe Tauern

The Goldberg Group is a sub-group of the Hohe Tauern mountain range within the Central Eastern Alps. It is located in Austria, in the states of Salzburg and Carinthia. Its highest peak is the Hocharn, 3,254 m (AA). Other well-known summits are the Hoher Sonnblick, with its observatory at 3,106 m above sea level (AA), and the Schareck at 3,123 m above sea level (AA).

== Name ==
The name of the group is related to the rich mineral ores of the area and the associated historic mining. Gold was mined in the Rauris valley as well as in the Gastein valley (in the Radhausberg Massif), and helped those two valleys – and also the Archbishops of Salzburg as feudal lords – in the High Middle Ages to gain enormous wealth.

Not until the 19th century the mines were finally closed due to unprofitability. Even today, gold can be panned in the Rauris. Peaks like the Goldbergspitze (3,073 m) and Goldzechkopf (3,042 m) recall times long past when gold was mined in the High Tauern. In addition, silver – as indicated by Silberpfennig (2,600 m) – and other precious metals were mined, as were precious stones (aquamarine, garnet and others).

== Geography ==
The Goldberg Group lies in the eastern half of the Hohe Tauern range. In the west of the group is the Großglockner High Alpine Road, in the east runs the Tauern Railway.

The boundaries of the Goldberg Group, based on the Alpine Club classification of the Eastern Alps, where they are shown as group no. 42, are formed as follows:

- To the north: Salzach River from Taxenbach down to its confluence with the Gasteiner Ache creek
- To the east: Gasteiner Ache (Gastein Valley) up to the Nassfeld headwaters – Gasteiner Tauern (Niederer Tauern) (Pass of the Alpine divide) – Mallnitz Creek as far as its confluence with the Möll River
- To the south: Möll Valley (running east-southeast up to Winklern)
- To the west: from the upper course of the Möll to Heiligenblut – along the Großglockner High Alpine Road to Hochtor Pass – down Seidlwinkl Valley to Rauris and Taxenbach.

According to the Mountain Range Classification for the Austrian Cave Directory (Gebirgsgruppengliederung für das österreichische Höhlenverzeichnis) according to Hubert Trimmel, in which the group is given no. 2580, the boundary is not formed by the Mallnitzer Tauern above Nassfeld, but by the Hoher Tauern Pass and the Anlauf Valley.

=== Neighbouring ranges ===
Together with the Ankogel Group, the Glockner Group, the Schober Group, the Kreuzeck Group, the Granatspitz Group, the Venediger Group, the Villgraten Mountains and the Rieserferner Group, the Goldberg Group is among the major mountain groups of the High Tauern.

=== Subdivision ===
According to the Mountain Range Classification for the Austrian Cave Directory, the group is further subdivided as follows:

- Sadnig Group in the knee of the River Möll
- Sonnblick–Böseck Group between the Hüttwinkl and Möll valleys
- Gamskarlspitze Group between Gastein and Mallnitz valleys
- Edelweißspitze Group between Fusch and Rauris valleys as far as the Salzach
- Hocharn Group between Hüttwinkl valley, Seidlwinkel valley and Hochtor (Grossglockner Road)
- Bernkogel–Türchlwand Group between Rauris and Gastein valleys as far as the Salzach

The Edelweißspitze Group (Radhausberg Massif) is part of the Ankogel Group according to the Alpine Club classification.

== Summits ==
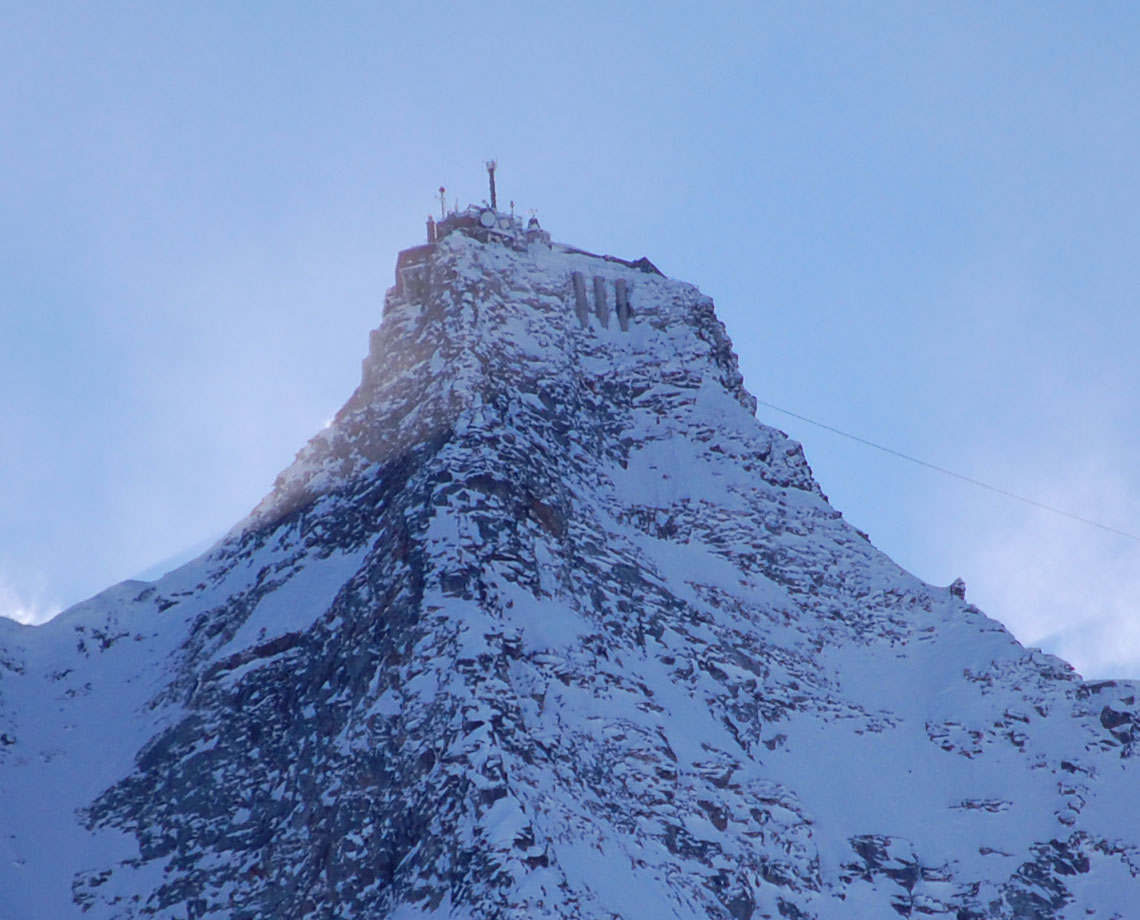
The Hoher Sonnblick with ZAMG observatory

All the named three-thousanders in the Goldberg Group:

- Hocharn 3,254 m above sea level (AA)
- Schareck 3,123 m above sea level (AA)
- Grieswies-Schwarzkogel 3,116 m above sea level (AA)
- Hoher Sonnblick 3,106 m above sea level (AA)
- Baumbachspitze 3,105 m above sea level (AA)
- Krumlkeeskopf 3,101 m above sea level (AA)
- Roter Mann 3,097 m above sea level (AA)
- Sandkopf 3,090 m above sea level (AA)
- Arlthöhe 3,084 m above sea level (AA)
- Goldbergspitze 3,073 m above sea level (AA)
- Schneehorn 3,062 m above sea level (AA)
- Goldzechkopf 3,042 m above sea level (AA)
- Schlapperebenspitzen max. 3,021 m above sea level (AA)
- Weinflaschenkopf 3,008 m above sea level (AA)
- Ritterkopf 3,006 m above sea level (AA)
- Noespitze 3,005 m above sea level (AA)

== Literature ==
- Liselotte Buchenauer, Peter Holl: Alpine Club Guide Ankogel- und Goldberggruppe. Bergverlag Rudolf Rother, Munich, 1986. ISBN 3-7633-1247-1
- Ingeborg Auer, Reinhard Böhm, Martin Leymüller, Wolfgang Schöner: Das Klima des Sonnblicks – Klimaatlas und Klimatographie der GAW-Station Sonnblick einschließlich der umgebenden Gebirgsregion, ZAMG Vienna, 2002, ISSN 1016-6254.
- Artur Hottinger (1935), Geologie der Gebirge zwischen der Sonnblick-Hocharn-Gruppe und dem Salzachtal in den östlichen Hohen Tauern (Doctoral Thesis) (in German), doi:10.3929/ethz-a-000096516 – via ETH Zürich
- Franz Stelzer: Grundzüge der Landformen der Goldberggruppe. In: Geographischer Jahresbericht aus Österreich 29, pp. 75–94.
