= Hoher Sonnblick =

Mountain in Austria

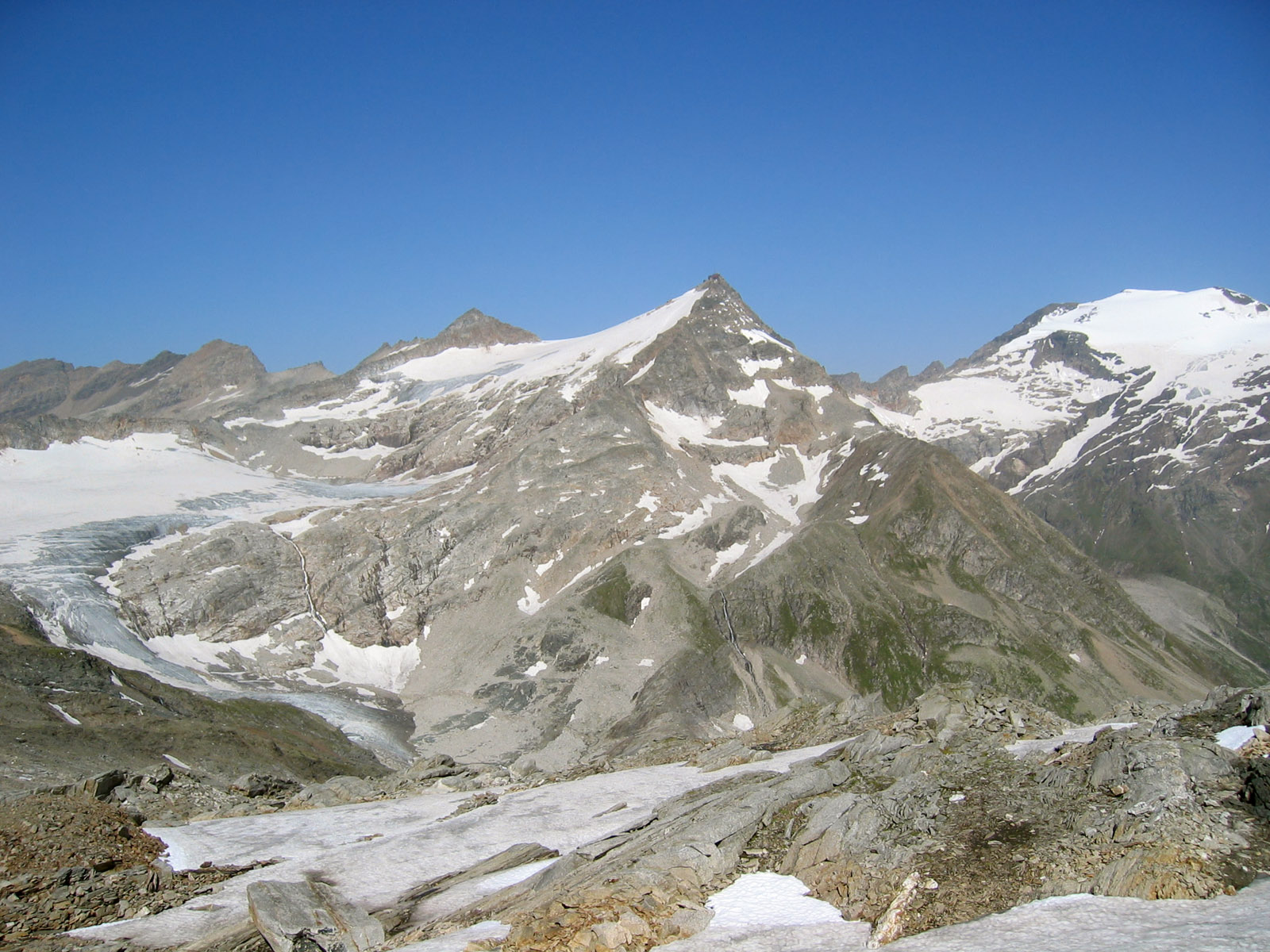
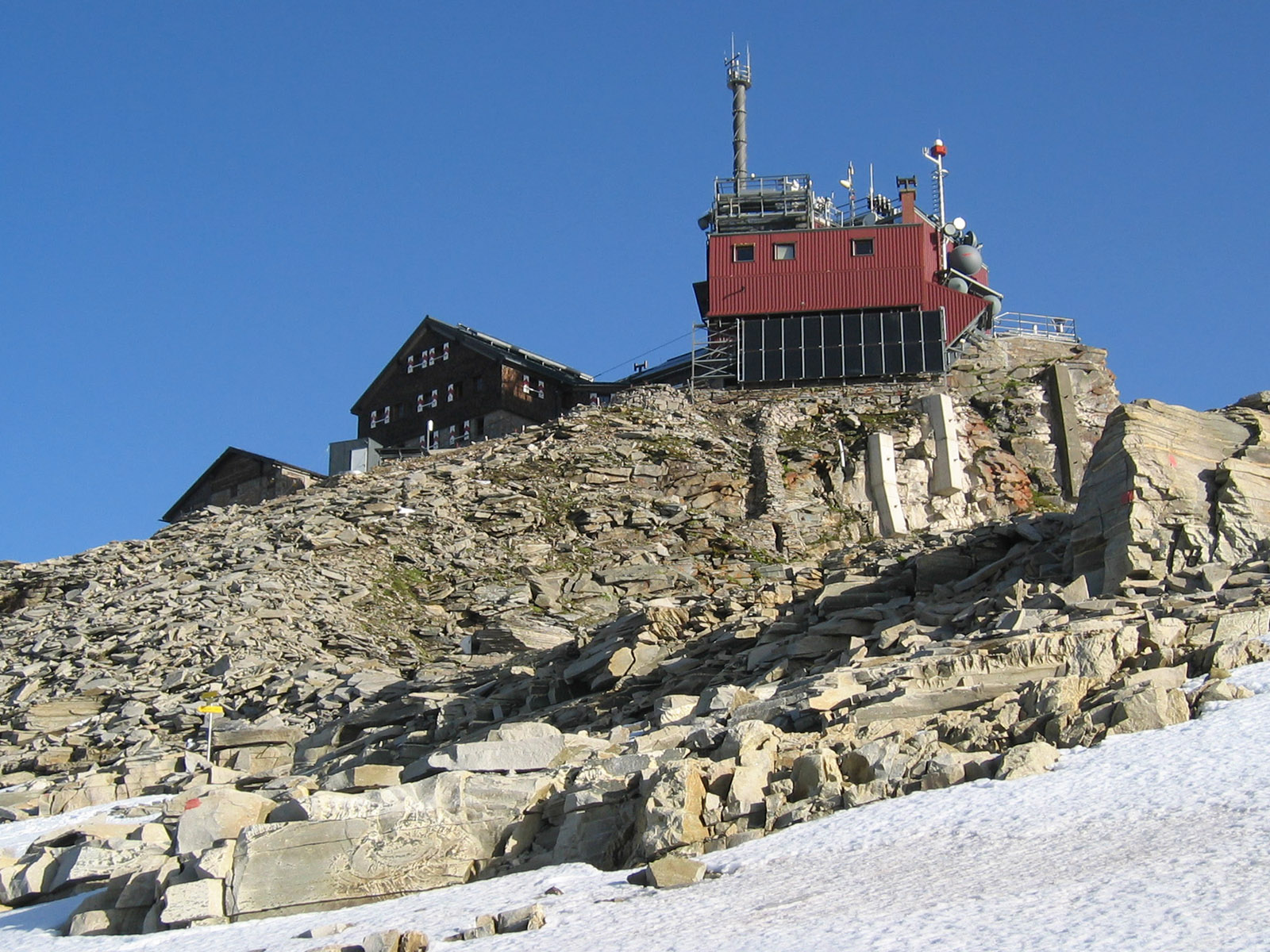
- The Hoher Sonnblick (centre) and Hocharn (right rear); view from the east Zittelhaus (left) and Sonnblick Observatory (right)

Highest point
- Elevation: 3,106 m (AA) (10,190 ft)
- Prominence: 3,106-2,857 m ↓ Goldzechscharte
- Isolation: 2.41 km → Hocharn
- Coordinates: 47°03′14″N 12°57′23″E

Geography
- Location within Austria
- Location: Carinthia and Salzburg, Austria
- Parent range: Goldberg Group

The Hoher Sonnblick (also Rauriser Sonnblick) is a glaciated mountain, 3,106 m (AA) high, on the main Alpine chain in the Goldberg Group on the border between the Austrian states of Carinthia and Salzburg. At its summit is the Sonnblick Observatory and the Alpine refuge hut of Zittelhaus.

== Location and area ==
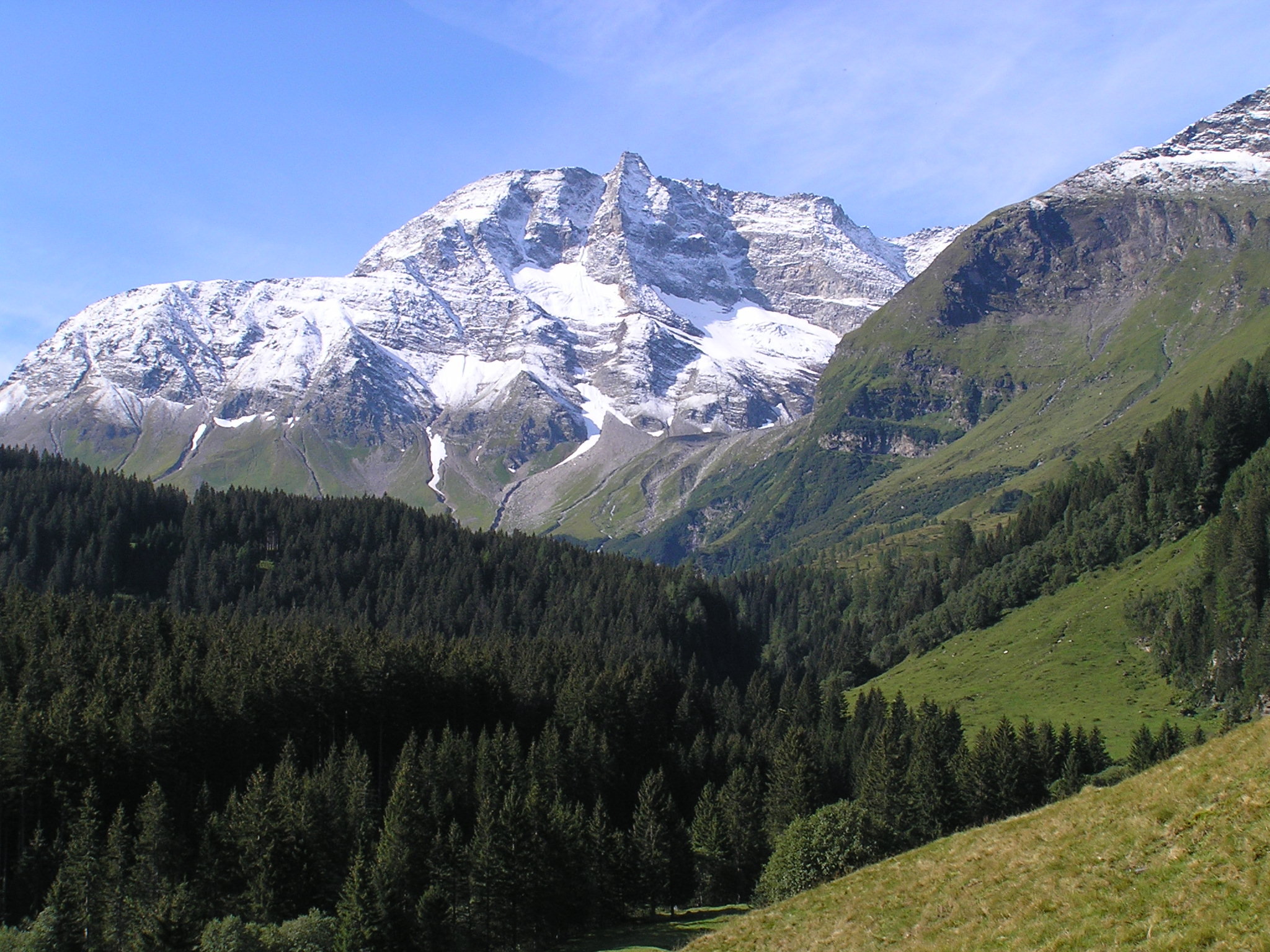
The Hoher Sonnblick seen from the north

The mountain rises at the head of the Hüttwinkltal valley, the upper part of the Raurisertal, on the Alpine divide. It is a mighty massif with a characteristic rock pyramid on the summit block and a great North Face above Kolm-Saigurn. The highest summit of the Goldberg Group is not the Hoher Sonnblick, however, but the 3,254-metre-high Hocharn to the north.

On the steep summit, at a height of 3,106 metres, is a meteorological observatory, the Sonnblick Observatory, and an Alpine refuge hut, the Zittelhaus (also written Zittlhaus). At a height of 2,718 metres is the Rojacher Hut and at 2,175 metres is the Schutzhaus Neubau. Both huts are managed during the summer months.

On 1 January 1905, a temperature of −37.4 °C (−35.3 °F) was recorded at the summit, the lowest temperature recorded in Austria at that time. St. Elmo's fire was observed by a webcam multiple times on the observatory between 2012-2014.

In the area of the Sonnblick there are historical gold mines, which gave their name to the mountain range around the Sonnblick, the Goldberg Group. Relics of gold digging still exist in the area; Kulm-Saigurn is an ancient mountain mining settlement. At the foot of the Sonnblick it is still possible to pan for gold.

== Literature and maps ==
- Liselotte Buchenauer, Peter Holl: Alpine Club Guide Ankogel- und Goldberggruppe. Bergverlag Rudolf Rother, Munich, 1986. ISBN 3-7633-1247-1
- Ingeborg Auer, Reinhard Böhm, Martin Leymüller, Wolfgang Schöner: Das Klima des Sonnblicks – Klimaatlas und Klimatographie der GAW-Station Sonnblick einschließlich der umgebenden Gebirgsregion, ZAMG, Vienna, 2002, ISSN 1016-6254.
- Alpine Club Map Sheet 42, 1:25,000 series, Sonnblick

== Climate ==
Sonnblick has a tundra climate (Köppen ET).

Climate data for Sonnblick: 3109m (1991−2020 normals)
Month	Jan	Feb	Mar	Apr	May	Jun	Jul	Aug	Sep	Oct	Nov	Dec	Year
Record high °C (°F)	3.3 (37.9)	3.9 (39.0)	2.2 (36.0)	4.3 (39.7)	8.9 (48.0)	15.3 (59.5)	14.3 (57.7)	15.2 (59.4)	10.4 (50.7)	8.0 (46.4)	5.0 (41.0)	2.6 (36.7)	15.3 (59.5)
Mean daily maximum °C (°F)	−8.6 (16.5)	−10.2 (13.6)	−7.2 (19.0)	−4.2 (24.4)	−0.3 (31.5)	3.7 (38.7)	5.8 (42.4)	5.8 (42.4)	1.9 (35.4)	−0.9 (30.4)	−4.9 (23.2)	−7.7 (18.1)	−2.2 (28.0)
Daily mean °C (°F)	−11.3 (11.7)	−12.0 (10.4)	−9.8 (14.4)	−6.7 (19.9)	−2.5 (27.5)	1.3 (34.3)	3.4 (38.1)	3.6 (38.5)	−0.1 (31.8)	−3.0 (26.6)	−7.1 (19.2)	−10.3 (13.5)	−4.5 (23.8)
Mean daily minimum °C (°F)	−13.2 (8.2)	−15.4 (4.3)	−11.8 (10.8)	−9.1 (15.6)	−4.6 (23.7)	−1.1 (30.0)	0.9 (33.6)	1.3 (34.3)	−2.2 (28.0)	−4.8 (23.4)	−9.2 (15.4)	−12.2 (10.0)	−6.8 (19.8)
Record low °C (°F)	−29.4 (−20.9)	−31.9 (−25.4)	−30.0 (−22.0)	−25.0 (−13.0)	−16.1 (3.0)	−12.3 (9.9)	−8.2 (17.2)	−9.3 (15.3)	−13.0 (8.6)	−19.5 (−3.1)	−24.9 (−12.8)	−30.5 (−22.9)	−31.9 (−25.4)
Average precipitation mm (inches)	149.5 (5.89)	128.3 (5.05)	169.3 (6.67)	163.3 (6.43)	164.8 (6.49)	156.8 (6.17)	173.6 (6.83)	175.0 (6.89)	130.4 (5.13)	142.0 (5.59)	159.1 (6.26)	155.5 (6.12)	1,867.6 (73.52)
Average precipitation days (≥ 1.0 mm)	15.4	14.7	17.1	16.8	17.6	17.8	17.7	17.2	14.1	13.1	15.4	16.6	193.5
Mean monthly sunshine hours	132.9	136.2	160.7	146.9	154.5	158.4	170.1	167.5	153.5	165.7	112.4	118	1,776.8
Source: Central Institute for Meteorology and Geodynamics NOAA(Precipitation days-Sun)

Climate data for Sonnblick (1981–2010 normals, extremes 1886–2010)
Month	Jan	Feb	Mar	Apr	May	Jun	Jul	Aug	Sep	Oct	Nov	Dec	Year
Record high °C (°F)	3.3 (37.9)	3.6 (38.5)	3.9 (39.0)	5.0 (41.0)	9.4 (48.9)	14.1 (57.4)	15.7 (60.3)	13.4 (56.1)	13.0 (55.4)	10.0 (50.0)	6.1 (43.0)	2.2 (36.0)	15.7 (60.3)
Mean daily maximum °C (°F)	−9.0 (15.8)	−9.8 (14.4)	−8.0 (17.6)	−5.0 (23.0)	−0.5 (31.1)	2.8 (37.0)	5.6 (42.1)	5.3 (41.5)	1.7 (35.1)	−0.9 (30.4)	−5.5 (22.1)	−8.2 (17.2)	−2.6 (27.3)
Daily mean °C (°F)	−11.5 (11.3)	−12.3 (9.9)	−10.7 (12.7)	−7.6 (18.3)	−2.8 (27.0)	0.3 (32.5)	2.8 (37.0)	2.7 (36.9)	−0.5 (31.1)	−3.1 (26.4)	−7.9 (17.8)	−10.7 (12.7)	−5.1 (22.8)
Mean daily minimum °C (°F)	−13.9 (7.0)	−14.6 (5.7)	−12.9 (8.8)	−9.7 (14.5)	−4.9 (23.2)	−2.0 (28.4)	0.5 (32.9)	0.6 (33.1)	−2.4 (27.7)	−4.9 (23.2)	−10.0 (14.0)	−13.0 (8.6)	−7.3 (18.9)
Record low °C (°F)	−37.4 (−35.3)	−36.6 (−33.9)	−34.6 (−30.3)	−26.6 (−15.9)	−20.0 (−4.0)	−15.8 (3.6)	−10.5 (13.1)	−10.0 (14.0)	−16.4 (2.5)	−25.4 (−13.7)	−28.5 (−19.3)	−33.0 (−27.4)	−37.4 (−35.3)
Average precipitation mm (inches)	183 (7.2)	140 (5.5)	203 (8.0)	241 (9.5)	225 (8.9)	159 (6.3)	220 (8.7)	204 (8.0)	218 (8.6)	174 (6.9)	127 (5.0)	169 (6.7)	2,263 (89.1)
Average snowfall cm (inches)	220 (87)	208 (82)	287 (113)	254 (100)	179 (70)	109 (43)	58 (23)	46 (18)	103 (41)	149 (59)	238 (94)	252 (99)	2,103 (828)
Average precipitation days (≥ 1 mm)	14.8	14.4	18.0	19.1	16.6	18.2	17.5	16.2	13.7	12.7	15.4	16.2	192.8
Average relative humidity (%) (at 14:00)	75.8	77.7	85.3	89.9	90.7	90.8	89.5	88.7	87.2	81.0	80.5	79.1	84.7
Mean monthly sunshine hours	141	146	153	133	144	143	165	158	155	169	123	115	1,746
Percentage possible sunshine	50.5	49.9	42.4	33.1	31.9	31.2	35.3	36.8	41.8	50.3	43.3	43.8	40.9
Source 1: Central Institution for Meteorology and Geodynamics (precipitation days 1971-2000)
Source 2: ECA&D (extremes) zamg.ac

Climate data for Sonnblick (1971–2000)
Month	Jan	Feb	Mar	Apr	May	Jun	Jul	Aug	Sep	Oct	Nov	Dec	Year
Record high °C (°F)	3.3 (37.9)	3.5 (38.3)	1.2 (34.2)	3.8 (38.8)	9.0 (48.2)	11.7 (53.1)	15.0 (59.0)	13.4 (56.1)	12.0 (53.6)	9.3 (48.7)	6.0 (42.8)	2.0 (35.6)	15.0 (59.0)
Mean daily maximum °C (°F)	−9.4 (15.1)	−9.8 (14.4)	−8.4 (16.9)	−5.7 (21.7)	−1.0 (30.2)	2.1 (35.8)	4.8 (40.6)	4.8 (40.6)	1.7 (35.1)	−1.5 (29.3)	−6.0 (21.2)	−8.2 (17.2)	−3.1 (26.4)
Daily mean °C (°F)	−11.7 (10.9)	−12.2 (10.0)	−10.9 (12.4)	−8.3 (17.1)	−3.3 (26.1)	−0.4 (31.3)	2.1 (35.8)	2.3 (36.1)	−0.6 (30.9)	−3.7 (25.3)	−8.3 (17.1)	−10.5 (13.1)	−5.5 (22.1)
Mean daily minimum °C (°F)	−13.8 (7.2)	−14.4 (6.1)	−13.0 (8.6)	−10.4 (13.3)	−5.4 (22.3)	−2.6 (27.3)	−0.1 (31.8)	0.2 (32.4)	−2.5 (27.5)	−5.5 (22.1)	−10.3 (13.5)	−12.7 (9.1)	−7.5 (18.5)
Record low °C (°F)	−32.7 (−26.9)	−31.3 (−24.3)	−33.2 (−27.8)	−21.2 (−6.2)	−16.4 (2.5)	−12.1 (10.2)	−8.5 (16.7)	−9.8 (14.4)	−13.0 (8.6)	−19.0 (−2.2)	−26.1 (−15.0)	−30.5 (−22.9)	−33.2 (−27.8)
Average precipitation mm (inches)	127.5 (5.02)	110.1 (4.33)	152.2 (5.99)	159.0 (6.26)	139.1 (5.48)	146.0 (5.75)	164.4 (6.47)	147.9 (5.82)	116.9 (4.60)	120.0 (4.72)	145.2 (5.72)	144.6 (5.69)	1,672.9 (65.86)
Average snowfall cm (inches)	239.0 (94.1)	203.7 (80.2)	282.6 (111.3)	293.6 (115.6)	203.6 (80.2)	123.7 (48.7)	72.0 (28.3)	51.3 (20.2)	109.1 (43.0)	169.4 (66.7)	246.4 (97.0)	271.4 (106.9)	2,265.8 (892.0)
Average precipitation days (≥ 1 mm)	14.8	14.4	18.0	19.1	16.6	18.2	17.5	16.2	13.7	12.7	15.4	16.2	192.8
Average relative humidity (%) (at 14:00)	75.8	76.9	84.7	89.0	90.5	90.5	88.9	88.6	87.0	81.1	79.7	76.9	84.1
Average dew point °C (°F)	−14.4 (6.1)	−14.6 (5.7)	−12.5 (9.5)	−9.0 (15.8)	−4.4 (24.1)	−1.5 (29.3)	0.4 (32.7)	0.3 (32.5)	−2.5 (27.5)	−6.7 (19.9)	−10.8 (12.6)	−13.4 (7.9)	−7.4 (18.6)
Mean monthly sunshine hours	120.4	131.6	138.7	128.1	150.7	145.5	177.4	179.8	160.7	163.0	117.2	108.4	1,721.5
Percentage possible sunshine	42.9	44.0	38.0	32.3	33.6	31.9	38.2	41.3	42.6	46.9	40.3	40.4	39.4
Source: Central Institution for Meteorology and Geodynamics NOAA(Dew Point 1961-1990)
