= Hocharn =

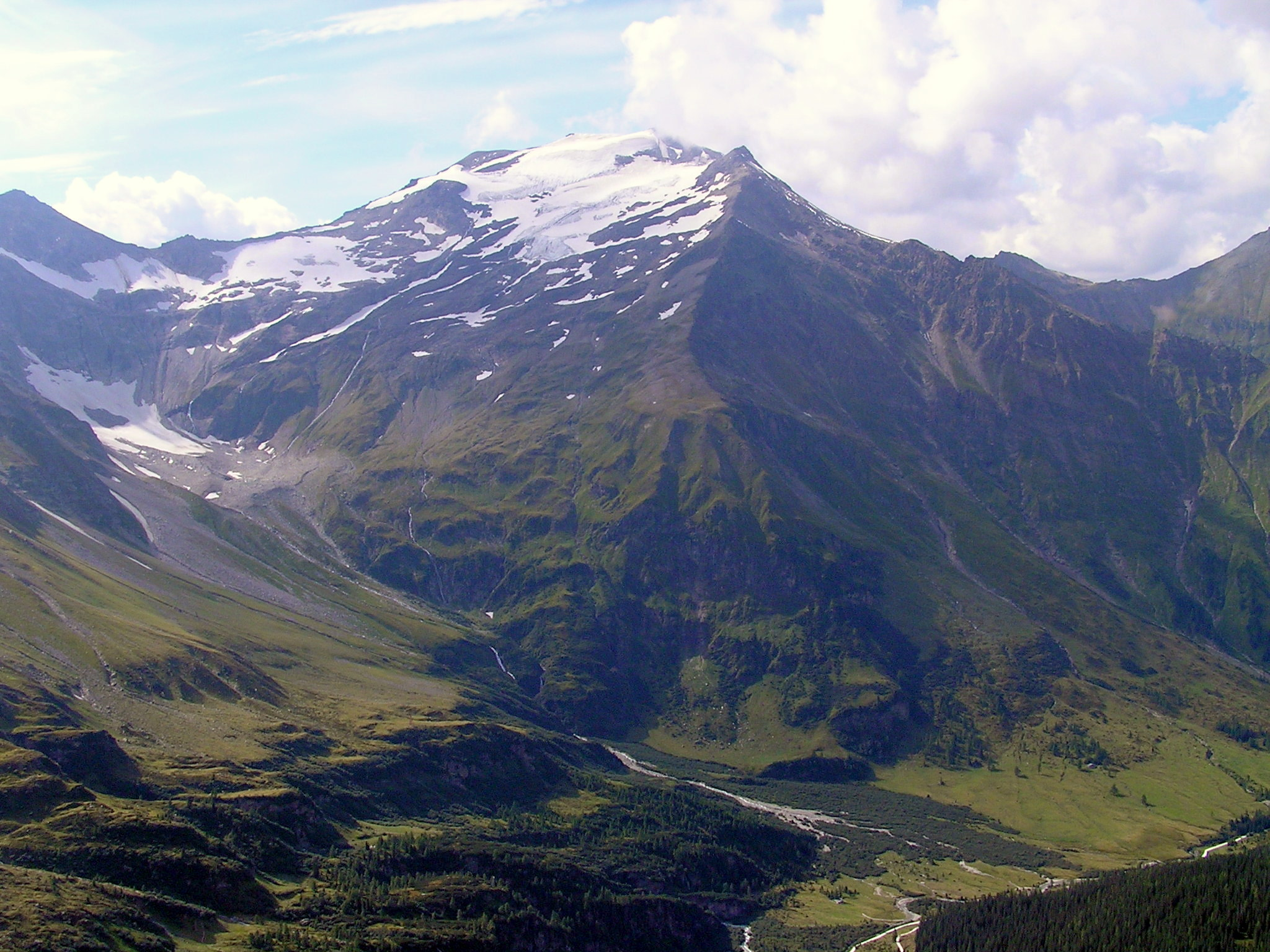
- Hocharn from Niedersachsenhaus

Highest point
- Elevation: 3,254 m (10,676 ft)
- Prominence: 678 m (2,224 ft)
- Listing: Alpine mountains above 3000 m
- Coordinates: 47°4′35″N 12°56′14″E

Geography
- Location within Alps
- Location: Salzburg, Austria
- Parent range: High Tauern, Alps

Hocharn (3,254m) is the highest mountain of the Goldberg Group in the High Tauern range of the eastern Alps. It is located near the town of Bad Hofgastein and is situated in the Austrian state of Salzburg.

The mountain has glaciers on its east, west and north sides. Climbs usually start from the Rauris valley. Although a demanding climb with about 1,700m of ascent, the climb is not technical. Another route starts at Heiligenblut.
