= Ingeborg Auer =

Austrian climate scientist

Ingeborg Auer is an Austrian climatologist, known for her work on Project HISTALP (Historical Instrumental Climatological Surface Time Series of the Greater Alpine Region).

Auer comes from Velden am Wörthersee. She studied from 1970 to 1975 at the Institute for Meteorology and Geophysics of the University of Vienna, where she received her doctorate with thesis Zur Chronik und Synoptik in den österreichischen Südalpenländernon (To the Chronicle and Synoptics in the Austrian Southern Alps). From 1975 Auer worked at the Central Institution for Meteorology and Geodynamics. In 2001 she became the head of the department for climatological land survey and hydroclimatology. In 2009 she became the head of the Climate Research Department. She retired in 2016.

Auer is known for her contribution to the creation of high-quality data sets for climate research, especially in the field of homogenization. Under her leadership together with Reinhard Böhm, the HISTALP climate database for the Alpine region was created. The HISTALP database is one of the most long-term and high-quality climate data sets in the world. The data based on her work shows that since 1800 the climatic zones in the Alps have moved to significantly higher elevations as part of climate change: In mountainous areas where there used to be snow all year round there is now often grass; where there was grass, forest often grows today.

== Selected publications ==
- Auer, I.; Böhm, R. (1994). "Combined temperature-precipitation variation in Austria during the instrumental period". Theoretical and Applied Climatology. 49 (3): 161–174. Bibcode:1994ThApC..49..161A. doi:10.1007/BF00865531. S2CID 119844572.
- Brázdil, R.; Budíková, M.; Auer, I.; Böhm, R.; Cegnar, T.; Faško, P.; Lapin, M.; Gajič-Čapka, M.; Zaninović, K.; Koleva, E.; Niedźwiedź, T.; Ustrnul, Z.; Szalai, S.; Weber, R. O. (1996). "Trends of Maximum and Minimum Daily Temperatures in Central and Southeastern Europe". International Journal of Climatology. 16 (7): 765–782. Bibcode:1996IJCli..16..765B. doi:10.1002/(SICI)1097-0088(199607)16:7<765::AID-JOC46>3.0.CO;2-O.
- Peterson, Thomas C.; Easterling, David R.; Karl, Thomas R.; Groisman, Pavel; Nicholls, Neville; Plummer, Neil; Torok, Simon; Auer, Ingeborg; Boehm, Reinhard; Gullett, Donald; Vincent, Lucie; Heino, Raino; Tuomenvirta, Heikki; Mestre, Olivier; Szentimrey, Tamás; Salinger, James; Førland, Eirik J.; Hanssen-Bauer, Inger; Alexandersson, Hans; Jones, Philip; Parker, David (1998). "Homogeneity adjustments of in situ atmospheric climate data: A review". International Journal of Climatology. 18 (13): 1493–1517. Bibcode:1998IJCli..18.1493P. doi:10.1002/(SICI)1097-0088(19981115)18:13<1493::AID-JOC329>3.0.CO;2-T.
- Böhm, Reinhard; Auer, Ingeborg; Brunetti, Michele; Maugeri, Maurizio; Nanni, Teresa; Schöner, Wolfgang (2001). "Regional temperature variability in the European Alps: 1760-1998 from homogenized instrumental time series". International Journal of Climatology. 21 (14): 1779–1801. Bibcode:2001IJCli..21.1779B. doi:10.1002/joc.689.
- Auer, Ingeborg; Matulla, Christoph; Böhm, Reinhard; Ungersböck, Markus; Maugeri, Maurizio; Nanni, Teresa; Pastorelli, Rossella (2005). "Sensitivity of frost occurrence to temperature variability in the European Alps". International Journal of Climatology. 25 (13): 1749–1766. Bibcode:2005IJCli..25.1749A. doi:10.1002/joc.1217.
- Auer, Ingeborg; Böhm, Reinhard; Jurkovic, Anita; Lipa, Wolfgang; Orlik, Alexander; Potzmann, Roland; Schöner, Wolfgang; Ungersböck, Markus; Matulla, Christoph; Briffa, Keith; Jones, Phil; Efthymiadis, Dimitrios; Brunetti, Michele; Nanni, Teresa; Maugeri, Maurizio; Mercalli, Luca; Mestre, Olivier; Moisselin, Jean-Marc; Begert, Michael; Müller-Westermeier, Gerhard; Kveton, Vit; Bochnicek, Oliver; Stastny, Pavel; Lapin, Milan; Szalai, Sándor; Szentimrey, Tamás; Cegnar, Tanja; Dolinar, Mojca; Gajic-Capka, Marjana; et al. (2007). "HISTALP—historical instrumental climatological surface time series of the Greater Alpine Region". International Journal of Climatology. 27 (1): 17–46. Bibcode:2007IJCli..27...17A. doi:10.1002/joc.1377.
- Moberg, Anders; Jones, Philip D.; Lister, David; Walther, Alexander; Brunet, Manola; Jacobeit, Jucundus; Alexander, Lisa V.; Della-Marta, Paul M.; Luterbacher, Jürg; Yiou, Pascal; Chen, Deliang; Klein Tank, Albert M. G.; Saladié, Oscar; Sigró, Javier; Aguilar, Enric; Alexandersson, Hans; Almarza, Carlos; Auer, Ingeborg; Barriendos, Mariano; Begert, Michael; Bergström, Hans; Böhm, Reinhard; Butler, C. J.; Caesar, John; Drebs, Achim; Founda, Dmitra; Gerstengarbe, Friedrich-Wilhelm; Micela, Giusi; Maugeri, Maurizio; et al. (2006). "Indices for daily temperature and precipitation extremes in Europe analyzed for the period 1901–2000" (PDF). Journal of Geophysical Research. 111 (D22): D22106. Bibcode:2006JGRD..11122106M. doi:10.1029/2006JD007103.
- Brunetti, Michele; Lentini, Gianluca; Maugeri, Maurizio; Nanni, Teresa; Auer, Ingeborg; Böhm, Reinhard; Schöner, Wolfgang (2009). "Climate variability and change in the Greater Alpine Region over the last two centuries based on multi-variable analysis". International Journal of Climatology. 29 (15): 2197–2225. Bibcode:2009IJCli..29.2197B. doi:10.1002/joc.1857.
- Hiebl, Johann; Auer, Ingeborg; Böhm, Reinhard; Schöner, Wolfgang; Maugeri, Maurizio; Lentini, Gianluca; Spinoni, Jonathan; Brunetti, Michele; Nanni, Teresa; Tadić, Melita; Perčec Bihari, Zita; Dolinar, Mojca; Müller-Westermeier, Gerhard (2009). "A high-resolution 19611990 monthly temperature climatology for the greater Alpine region". Meteorologische Zeitschrift. 18 (5): 507–530. Bibcode:2009MetZe..18..507.. doi:10.1127/0941-2948/2009/0403.
- Spinoni, Jonathan; Szalai, Sandor; Szentimrey, Tamás; Lakatos, Monika; Bihari, Zita; Nagy, Andrea; Németh, Ákos; Kovács, Tamás; Mihic, Dragan; Dacic, Milan; Petrovic, Predrag; Kržič, Aleksandra; Hiebl, Johann; Auer, Ingeborg; Milkovic, Janja; Štepánek, Petr; Zahradnícek, Pavel; Kilar, Piotr; Limanowka, Danuta; Pyrc, Robert; Cheval, Sorin; Birsan, Marius-Victor; Dumitrescu, Alexandru; Deak, György; Matei, Monica; Antolovic, Igor; Nejedlík, Pavol; Štastný, Pavel; Kajaba, Peter; et al. (2015). "Climate of the Carpathian Region in the period 1961-2010: Climatologies and trends of 10 variables". International Journal of Climatology. 35 (7): 1322–1341. Bibcode:2015IJCli..35.1322S. doi:10.1002/joc.4059.
