= Rauris =

- Municipality
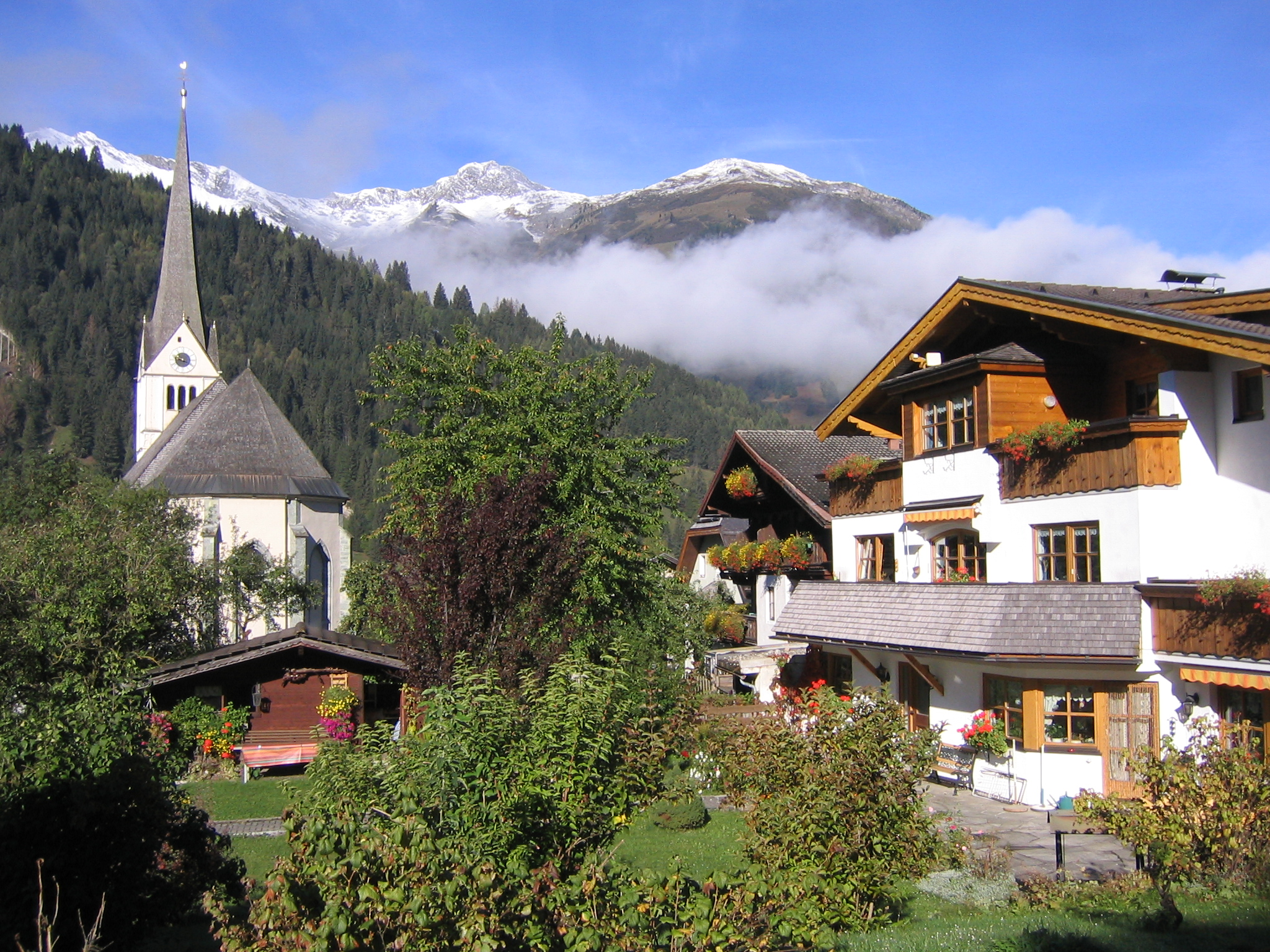

- Coat of arms

- Location within Austria
- Coordinates: 47°13′45″N 12°59′40″E
- Country: Austria
- State: Salzburg
- District: Zell am See

Government
  - Mayor: Peter Loitfellner (SPÖ)

Area
  - Total: 253.14 km^{2} (97.74 sq mi)
- Elevation: 950 m (3,120 ft)

Population (2018-01-01)
  - Total: 3,044
  - Density: 12.02/km^{2} (31.14/sq mi)
- Time zone: UTC+1 (CET)
  - Summer (DST): UTC+2 (CEST)
- Postal code: 5661
- Area code: 06544
- Vehicle registration: ZE
- Website: www.rauris.net

Rauris is a municipality in Salzburg (state) in the area of Pinzgau in Austria. There are about 3,150 inhabitants living in Rauris.

== Geography ==
The market town Rauris is located in the Pinzgau in the state Salzburg at the river Rauriser Ache at the bottom of the Sonnblick group in the heart of the Nationalpark Hohe Tauern. Rauris is the largest municipal area of the province of Salzburg.

Bucheben, Fröstlberg, Grub, Hundsdorf, Marktrevier, Rauris, Seidlwinkl, Unterland, Vorstanddorf, Vorstandrevier, Wörth and Wörtherberg are all within the municipal area of Rauris.

== History ==
=== Overview of historic development ===
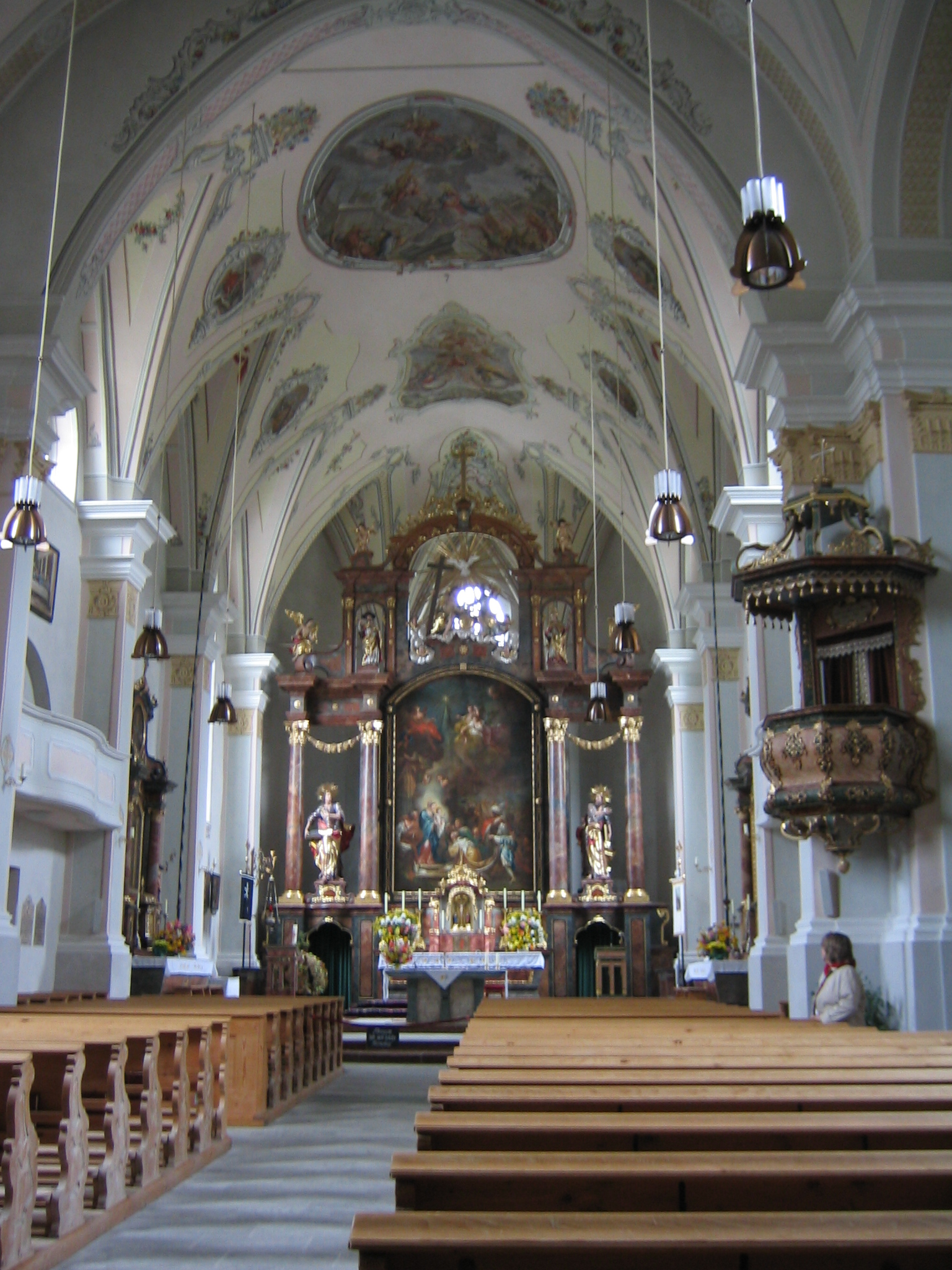
Church of Rauris

The valley of Rauris is one of the lesser valleys in the Tauern that is permanently populated. Archaeological findings show that these passes were used by ancient people near the Rauriser Tauern (Hochtor). A gilt neck-ring was found on the Maschlalm which originated from the time of La Tène in about 400 B.C. In the centre of Rauris six silver-coins were found, of which three show the head of Philip II of Macedon, who reigned 360 to 336 B.C. on the Balkan.

Further findings are a small Hercules-statue from Roman-times, a bronze-sword from 1300 B.C., older than a scarab discovered from the time of Ramses II in about 1200 B.C.

=== The settlement ===
The valley was first settled in the south. This began with the founding of Schwaigen in the 12th century. The present-day place of Rauris was named after the Gaisbach earlier. It was first mentioned in 1120. The name "Rurise" appeared for the first time in 1122, when Bishop Heinrich of Freising handed over two yards to his brother Count Friedrich of Peilstein, and marked the whole valley.

=== Rauris as a resting point ===
By 1230, Wörth was an important resting point for people and vehicles passing south over the Tauern (Seidlwinkl) to the mining-area in (Hüttwinkl).

The valley of Seidlwinkl was the eastern gateway to the Tauern (Hochtor), its advantage being that it could be open for longer. The importance of the valley led to the construction of the original Rauriser Tauernhaus that gave shelter and warmth to passing tradesmen. Much like the existing pass houses in other valleys. The Rauriser Tauernhaus got the right to sell drinks in 1491.

=== Construction of the church in Rauris ===
In 1203 the delighted Chrysant of Einöd constructed a chapel in honour of St. Michael. In 1339, the reconstruction of the church was applied for and in just 15 years was completed. In documents from 1411, it has been discovered that the church was reconstructed once again. However, there has only been a consecrated and independent parish of Rauris since 1858. The parish-church of Rauris is called the Church of Saint Martin and Saint James.

=== Gold-mining ===
The valley gained providence and wealth through gold-mining. From 1377 to 1802, Rauris held an independent country and mountain-court. Mining reached its peak from the 15th to 16th centuries. The houses of the mine-workers still testify to the affluence of this time with bow-gates and bay windows. By 1500, the valley had more than 3.000 inhabitants.

=== Construction of the weather station ===
Gold-operator Ignaz Rojacher, who lived in the 19th century, built the weather station on Hoher Sonnblick (3.105m / 10.687 feet) in 1886 as a worldwide first and the then most highly situated meteorological observation station.

The cable car which supplied the weather station on Sonnblick was completed in 1954. Until then, everything which was required had to be carried from the valley to the summit.

=== The 20th century ===
After gold-mining almost came to a complete end at the beginning of the 20th century in Raurisertal, attempts were made to try and revive the industry.

However, at the beginning of talks within the Rauris community, proposals to recreate the industry were rejected in fear that it could damage the environment and the region's tourism prospects.

=== The Town ===
In 1478, the name "market town" was used as a title for Rauris. This was confirmed in 1884 by Emperor Franz Josef and again in 1928 more recently.

In 1732, 166 Protestants had to leave the Raurisertal during the Protestant-expulsion.

== Politics ==
- 1971–1974 Siegfried Rasser (ÖVP)
- 1974–1984 Anton Altenhuber (ÖVP)
- 1984–1989 Otto Kaiserer (ÖVP)
- 1989–2014 Robert Reiter (ÖVP)
- 2014–current Peter Loitfellner (SPÖ)

== Economy and infrastructure ==
Rauris is a popular tourist destination with over 420.000 overnight stays each year.

=== Rauris Hochalmbahnen ===
Rauris Hochalmbahnen
- Interactive map of Rauris Hochalmbahnen
- Location: Rauris
- Coordinates: 47.223980°N 12.991583°E
- Vertical: 1,235 m (4,052 ft)
- Top elevation: 2,175 m (7,136 ft)
- Base elevation: 940 m (3,080 ft)
- Total length: 32 km (20 mi)

Rauris is home to a ski resort within walking distance from the town center. The resort offers up to 32 kilometers and ten lifts, including three gondolas and a chairlift.

== Notable people ==
- Ulrike Maier, two-time Super-G World Alpine Ski Champion
- Reinhard Schwabenitzky, director

== Climate ==
The Köppen Climate Classification sub-type for this climate is "Dfb" (Warm Summer Continental Climate).

Climate data for Rauris
Month	Jan	Feb	Mar	Apr	May	Jun	Jul	Aug	Sep	Oct	Nov	Dec	Year
Mean daily maximum °C (°F)	2 (35)	4 (39)	8 (46)	12 (53)	17 (63)	19 (67)	22 (71)	22 (71)	18 (65)	13 (56)	6 (43)	2 (35)	12 (54)
Mean daily minimum °C (°F)	−8 (17)	−7 (19)	−3 (27)	1 (33)	4 (40)	7 (45)	9 (49)	9 (49)	6 (43)	2 (35)	−3 (26)	−7 (19)	1 (34)
Average precipitation mm (inches)	58 (2.3)	46 (1.8)	64 (2.5)	66 (2.6)	91 (3.6)	140 (5.6)	160 (6.4)	140 (5.6)	100 (4)	74 (2.9)	71 (2.8)	66 (2.6)	1,090 (42.8)
Average precipitation days	4	7	5	4	5	4	8	6	6	5	5	8	68
Source: Weatherbase

== See also ==
- Salzburgerland
- Salzburg
